= List of dance companies =

This is a list of notable dance companies (including ballet companies).

List of dance and ballet companies
Company	Style	Based in city/region	Country	Founder Artistic director (AD) Choreographer	Active
3e étage		Paris	France	Founder & AD Samuel Murez	2006–present
Ability Unlimited	Indian classical dance	New Delhi	India	Founder & Director Syed Sallauddin Pasha	early 1980s–present
Abby Lee Dance Company	contemporary	Los Angeles	United States	Founder & Director Abby Lee Miller	1980–present
Aglaja	contemporary dance	Bruges	Belgium	Founder Jan Dewulf	late 1960s–present
Agnes de Mille Dance Theatre	ballet and Broadway-style dance theatre	Winston-Salem, North Carolina	United States	Founder Agnes de Mille	1953–1954 and 1974–1975
Alberta Ballet Company	ballet	Edmonton, Alberta	Canada	Founder Ruth Carse; AD Jean Grand-Maître	early 1950s–present
Alonzo King LINES Ballet	contemporary ballet	San Francisco, California	United States	Founder & AD Alonzo King	1982–present
Alvin Ailey American Dance Theater	modern dance	New York City	United States	Founder Alvin Ailey; AD Alicia Graf Mack	1958–present
American Ballet Theatre	ballet	New York City	United States	Founder Mikhail Mordkin; AD Kevin McKenzie	1937–present
American Chamber Ballet	ballet	New York City	United States	Founder Joel Benjamin	(unknown)–1976
Arcane Collective	contemporary dance			Founder Morleigh Steinberg and Oguri	2011–present
Aspen Santa Fe Ballet	contemporary ballet	Aspen, Colorado; Santa Fe, New Mexico	United States	AD Tom Mossbrucker	2000–present (in current incarnation)
Atlanta Ballet	ballet	Atlanta, Georgia	United States	AD John McFall	1929–present
Atlanta Festival Ballet	ballet	Stockbridge, Georgia	United States	Co-ADs Gregory Aaron & Nicolas Pacaña	1989–present
Atlantic Ballet Theatre of Canada	ballet	Moncton, New Brunswick	Canada	Founder Susan Chalmers-Gauvin; AD Igor Dobrovolskiy	2002–present
Attack Theatre	contemporary	Pittsburgh, Pennsylvania	United States	Founders & AD Michele de la Reza and Peter Kope	1994–present
The Australian Ballet	ballet	Melbourne	Australia	AD David McAllister	1962–present
Australian Dance Theatre	contemporary	Adelaide	Australia	Founder Elizabeth Cameron Dalman; AD Garry Stewart	1965–present
AXIS Dance Company	contemporary	Oakland, California	United States	Founders Bonnie Lewkowicz, Thais Mazur, Judith Smith & others	1987–present
Ballet Austin (formerly Austin Ballet Society)	ballet	Austin, Texas	United States	AD Stephen Mills	1956–present
Ballet Deviare	contemporary ballet	New York City	United States	Founders & co-ADs: Laura Kowalewski & Andrew Carpenter	
Ballet Fantastique	ballet	Eugene, Oregon	United States	AD Donna Marisa Bontrager	2000–present
Ballet Hispanico	contemporary	New York City	United States	Founder Tina Ramirez, AD Eduardo Vilaro	1970–present
Ballet Jörgen Canada	ballet	Ontario	Canada	AD Bengt Jörgen	1987–present
Ballet Magnificat!	Christian dance company	Jackson, Mississippi	United States	Founders Keith & Kathy Thibodeaux; AD Kathy Thibodeaux	1986–present
Ballet Nacional de Cuba	ballet	Havana	Cuba	Founder Alicia Alonso	1948–present
Ballet Nouveau Colorado	contemporary ballet contemporary dance	Broomfield, Colorado	United States	AD Garrett Ammon	2002–present
Ballet Philippines	ballet	Metro Manila	Philippines	AD Paul Alexander Morales	1969–present
Ballet Russe de Monte-Carlo	ballet	Monte Carlo	Monaco	Founders René Blum & Wassily de Basil	1932–1968
Ballet Theatre of Queensland	ballet	Queensland	Australia	Founder Phyllis Danaher; ADs Timothy Brown & Libby McDonnell	1937–present
Ballet West	ballet	Salt Lake City	United States	Founder Willam F. Christensen	1963–present
Balletcollective	Ballet, Artist collective, Contemporary ballet	New York City	United States	Founder and Director Troy Schumacher	2010–present
Les Ballets de Monte-Carlo	ballet	Monte Carlo	Monaco	AD Jean-Christophe Maillot	1985–present
Les Ballets Nègres	black dance	London	United Kingdom	Berto Pasuka	1946–1953
Ballets Russes	ballet	Paris	France	AD Sergei Diaghilev	1909–1929
Les Ballets Trockadero de Monte Carlo	ballet	New York City	United States	Founders Peter Anastos, Antony Bassae & Natch Taylor; AD Tory Dobrin	1974–present
Ballets with a Twist	ballet	New York City	United States	Founder and AD Marilyn Klaus	1996–present
Bangarra Dance Theatre	contemporary	Sydney	Australia	AD Stephen Page	1989–present
Bat-Dor Dance Company	modern	Tel Aviv	Israel	Founders Baroness Batsheva de Rothschild & Jeannette Ordman	1968–present
Batsheva Dance Company	contemporary	Tel Aviv	Israel	Founders Baroness Batsheva De Rothschild & Martha Graham AD Ohad Naharin	1964–present
Bay Pointe Ballet	ballet	South San Francisco, California	United States	AD Bruce Steivel	2013–present
Béjart Ballet	ballet	Lausanne	Switzerland	AD Gil Roman	1992–present
Bellydance Superstars	belly dance	Los Angeles, California	United States		2003–present
Bill T. Jones/Arnie Zane Dance Company	modern	New York City	United States	Founders Bill T. Jones & Arnie Zane	1983–present
Birmingham Royal Ballet	ballet	Birmingham	England	AD David Bintley	1931–present
Black Grace	modern	Auckland	New Zealand	Founder Neil Ieremia	1995–present
Bolshoi Ballet	ballet	Moscow	Russia	AD Yuri Burlaka	1776–present
Boston Ballet	ballet	Boston, Massachusetts	United States	AD Mikko Nissinen	1963–present
Brighton Ballet Theater	ballet	New York City	United States		1987–present
Camille A. Brown and Dancers	modern	New York City	United States	Founder Camille A. Brown	2006–present
Candoco	contemporary	Stanmore, London	England	Founders Celeste Dandeker & Adam Benjamin	1991–present
Caracalla Dance Theatre	contemporary	Beirut	Lebanon	Founder Abdel-Halim Caracalla	1970–present
Carolina Ballet	ballet	Raleigh, North Carolina	United States	Founder Ann Vorus; AD Robert Weiss	1984–present
Carte Blanche	contemporary	Bergen	Norway	Founders Jennifer Day/Toni Ferraz; AD Bruno Heynderickx	1984–present
Cedar Lake Contemporary Ballet	ballet	New York City	United States	Founder Nancy Laurie; AD Benoit-Swan Pouffer	2003–2015
Centre Chorégraphique National de Nantes	contemporary	Nantes	France	AD Claude Brumachon and Benjamin Lamarche	present
Cheremosh Ukrainian Dance Company	Ukrainian dance	Edmonton, Alberta	Canada	Founder Chester & Luba Kuc; AD Mykola Kanevets	1969–present
Chicago Dance Crash	hip hop	Chicago, Illinois	United States	AD Jessica Deahr	2002–present
Chicago Festival Ballet	ballet	Chicago, Illinois	United States	Founder & AD Kenneth von Heidecke	1989–present
Chunky Move	contemporary	Melbourne	Australia	Founder & AD Gideon Obarzanek	1995–present
Cincinnati Ballet	ballet	Cincinnati, Ohio	United States	AD Morgan, Victoria	1963–present
CityDance Ensemble	modern dance	Washington, D.C.	United States	AD Paul Gordon Emerson	1996–present
Cloud Gate Dance Theater	modern	Taiwan	Republic of China	Founder & AD Lin Hwai-min	1973–present
Cluj-Napoca Romanian Opera	ballet	Cluj-Napoca	Romania		1919–present
Columbia City Jazz Dance Company	jazz and contemporary	Columbia, South Carolina	United States	Founder & AD Dale Lam	1990–present
Companhia Nacional de Bailado	Classic	Lisbon	Portugal		1977–present
Complexions Contemporary Ballet	contemporary	New York City	United States	Founders & ADs Dwight Rhoden & Desmond Richardson	1994–present
Contemporary Dance Company of Angola	contemporary		Angola		1991–present
CorbinDances	modern	New York City	United States	Founder Patrick Corbin	2005–present
Cullberg Ballet	ballet	Hallunda (National Swedish Touring Theatre headquarters)	Sweden	Founder Birgit Cullberg; AD Anna Grip	1967–present
D Underbelly	theatre, modern dance; varied disciplines	Brooklyn, New York	United States	Curator Baraka de Soleil	1997–present
Dance Alloy	modern	Pittsburgh, Pennsylvania	United States	AD Greer Reed-Jones	1976–2012
Dance Hub SA	contemporary	Adelaide	Australia	Founder Leigh Warren	1993–present
Dance Theatre of Harlem	ballet	Harlem, New York City	United States	Founders Arthur Mitchell & Karel Shook; AD Arthur Mitchell	1971–present
Dancenorth	contemporary	Townsville, North Queensland	Australia	Founder Ann Roberts; AD Raewyn Hill	1969–present
Danza Contemporanea de Cuba	modern	Havana	Cuba	Founder Ramiro Guerra	1959–present
Danza Voluminosa	modern, ballet	Havana	Cuba	Founder Juan Miguel Mas	1996–present
Darpana Academy of Performing Arts	Classical Bharata Natyam and contemporary	Ahmedabad	India	Founder Mrinalini and Vikram Sarabhai	1949–Present
DC Cowboys	various	Washington, DC	United States	Founder Kevin Platte	1994–2012
Dreamboys	various	London	United Kingdom	AD Jordan Darrell	1987–present
Dutch National Ballet	classical ballet and contemporary dance (about 50/50)	Amsterdam	Netherlands	AD Ted Brandsen	1961–present
DV8 Physical Theatre	contemporary dance with visual media	London	England	AD Lloyd Newson	1986–present
ECNAD	contemporary	South East Asia	Singapore	AD Lim Chin Huat & Tan How Choon	1996–present
Editta Braun Company	body theatre	Salzburg	Austria	Founder Editta Braun	1989–present
Eifman Ballet	contemporary ballet	Saint Petersburg	Russia	Founder Boris Eifman	1977–present
English National Ballet	ballet	London	England	Founders Anton Dolin & Dame Alicia Markova; AD Tamara Rojo	1955–present
Eryc Taylor Dance	modern	New York City	United States	Founder Eryc Taylor	2007–present
Eugene Ballet	ballet	Eugene, Oregon	United States	AD Toni Pimble	1978–present
Fire of Anatolia	modern dance & ballet	Istanbul	Turkey	Founder & AD Mustafa Erdoğan	1999–present
Folsom Lake Civic Ballet	ballet	Folsom, California	United States	AD Deirdre Hawkins	
The Forsythe Company	modern ballet	Dresden	Germany	AD William Forsythe	2005–present
Full Radius Dance	modern, physically integrated	Atlanta	United States	Founder & AD Douglas Scott	1995–present
Gallimaufry Performing Arts	contemporary and classic	Laguna Beach, California	United States	Founder Steve Josephson	2004–present
Garth Fagan Dance	contemporary modern	Rochester, New York	United States	Founder Garth Fagan	1970–present
Gary Palmer Dance Company	contemporary modern	San Francisco (1977–91), San Jose (1991–98)	United States	Founder Gary Palmer	1977–98
Grupo Corpo	modern dance	Belo Horizonte, Minas Gerais	Brazil	Paulo Pederneiras	1975–present
Les Gens du quai	contemporary	Montpellier	France	Founders Anne & François Lopez	1993–present
Giordano Dance Chicago	jazz	Chicago, Illinois	United States	Founder Gus Giordano AD Nan Giordano	1963–present
Les Grands Ballets Canadiens	ballet	Montreal, Quebec	Canada	Founder Ludmilla Chiriaeff; AD Gradimir Pankov	1957–present
Goldwyn Girls	film musical dance	Hollywood, California	United States	Founder Samuel Goldwyn	1930s–1950s
Hamburg Ballet	ballet	Hamburg	Germany	Founder & AD John Neumeier	1973–present
Hot Shots	swing	Stockholm	Sweden	Founders Anders Lind & others	1985–present
Heidi Duckler Dance Theatre	site-specific modern	Los Angeles	United States	Founder Heidi Duckler	1985–present
Houston Ballet	ballet	Houston, Texas	United States	Founder Nina Popova; AD Stanton Welch	1969–present
Houston Metropolitan Dance Company	contemporary, jazz	Houston, Texas	United States	Founder Michelle Smith; AD Marlana Doyle	1995–present
Hubbard Street Dance Chicago	contemporary	Chicago, Illinois	United States	Founder Lou Conte; AD Linda-Denise Fisher-Harrell	1977–present
Ice Theatre of New York	modern dance on ice	New York City	United States	Founder Moira North; Co-AD David Liu	1984–present
James Sewell Ballet	ballet	Minneapolis, Minnesota	United States	Founders James Sewell & Sally Rousse	1990–present
The Jefferson Dancers	various	Portland, Oregon	United States	Founder Mary Vinton Folberg; AD Steve Gonzales	early 1980s–present
Joffrey Ballet	ballet	Chicago, Illinois	United States	Founders Robert Joffrey & Gerald Arpino	1965–present
Judson Dance Theater	postmodern dance	New York City	United States	Founder Robert Ellis Dunn	1962–1964
Junk Ensemble	Dance theater	Dublin	Ireland	Founders Megan and Jessica Kennedy	2004–present
K-ballet	ballet	Tokyo	Japan	AD Tetsuya Kumakawa	1999–present
Kage Physical Theatre	physical theatre	Melbourne	Australia	Founders Kate Denborough & Gerard van Dyck	1996–present
Kambras	tango Tanztheater	Buenos Aires	Argentina Germany	Founders Gonzalo Orihuela, Julián Rodriguez Orihuela & Solange Chapperon	2005–present
Katherine Dunham Company	African American modern dance		United States	Founder Katherine Dunham	1939–1960
Kansas City Ballet	ballet	Missouri	United States	AD William Whitener	early 1957–present
Kaunas Dance Theatre Aura	modern	Kaunas	Lithuania	Founder Birutė Letukaitė	early 1980s–present
Kibbutz Contemporary Dance Company	contemporary	Ga'aton	Israel	Founder Yehudit Arnon, Artistic Director Rami Be’er	1970–present
La Cebra Danza Gay		Mexico City	Mexico	José Rivera Moya	1996–present
La La La Human Steps	contemporary	Montreal, Quebec	Canada	Founder Édouard Lock	1980–present
Laleget Danza		Mexico City	Mexico	Diego Vázquez	2005–present
Lar Lubovitch Dance Company	modern	New York City	United States	Founder Lar Lubovitch	1968–present
Les Ballets Trockadero de Monte Carlo	ballet	New York City	United States	Peter Anastos, Natch Taylor, and Anthony Bassae	1974–present
Light Motion Dance Company	experimental	Seattle	United States	Founder Charlene Curtiss	1988–present
Live Action Set	experimental	Minneapolis, Minnesota	United States	Founders Noah Bremer & others	2003–present
Louise Bédard Danse	contemporary	Montreal, Quebec	Canada	Founder Louise Bédard	1990–present
Lydia Johnson Dance	modern dance & ballet	South Orange, New Jersey	United States	Founder Lydia Johnson	1999–present
Lyon Opera Ballet (Ballet de l'Opéra de Lyon)	ballet	Lyon	France	AD Yorgos Loukos	1969–present
Maria Kong	modern dance	Tel Aviv	Israel	Founders Anderson Braz, Talia Landa, Leo Lerus and Yaara Moses	2009–present
Mariinsky Ballet	classical ballet	Saint Petersburg (Mariinsky Theatre)	Russia	AD Valery Gergiev	1740s–present
Marion Rice Denishawn Dancers	modern	Fitchburg, Massachusetts	United States	Founder Marion Rice	1940s
Mendocino Ballet	ballet	Mendocino County, California	United States	Founder Mary Knight Morris	1984–present
Mark Morris Dance Group	modern	Brooklyn, New York	United States	Founder Mark Morris	1980–present
Munt–Brooks Dance Studios	modern	New York City	United States	Founders Alfred Brooks, Maxine Munt	1952–1966; originally at 1125 6th Ave. moved to Denver in 1966
Merce Cunningham Dance Company	modern	New York City	United States	Founder Merce Cunningham; AD Robert Swinston	1953–Dec. 31, 2011
MIHR	contemporary	Yerevan	Armenia	Founders Shoghakat & Tsolak MLKE-Galstyans	2003–present
Miami City Ballet	ballet	Miami, Florida	United States	Founder Edward Villella; AD Lourdes Lopez	1986–present
Milwaukee Ballet	ballet	Milwaukee, Wisconsin	United States	Founder Roberta Boorse; AD Michael Pink	1969–present
Misnomer dance theater	modern dance	Brooklyn, New York	United States	Founder Chris Elam	1998–present
Minnesota Ballet	ballet	Duluth, Minnesota	United States	Founders Donna Harkins & Jan Gibson; AD Robert Gardner	1965–present
Minnesota Dance Theatre	contemporary	Minneapolis, Minnesota	United States	Founder Loyce Houlton; AD Lisa Houlton	1962–present
Mirramu Dance Company	contemporary	Lake George, New South Wales	Australia	Founders Elizabeth Cameron Dalman & Vivienne Rogis	2002–present
Moldova National Opera Ballet	ballet	Chişinău	Moldova		1957–present
Momix	contemporary, illusion	Washington, Connecticut	United States	Founder & AD Moses Pendleton	1981–present
Moscow Ballet (United States)	ballet		United States (Note: U.S. owned company; dancers based in Moscow and Ukraine.)		1993–present
Motionhouse	contemporary	Leamington Spa	England	Founders Louise Richards & Kevin Finnan	1988–present
Motora	folk dance	Joensuu	Finland		1968–present
Mystic Ballet	contemporary, TIC Theater	Stonington, Connecticut	United States	Founder & AD Goran Subotic	1997–present
National Ballet of Canada	ballet	Toronto, Ontario	Canada	Founder Celia Franca; AD Karen Kain	1951–present
National Ballet Theater of Puerto Rico	ballet	Guaynabo, Puerto Rico	United States		2005–present
National Dance Company of Korea	Korean dance	Seoul	South Korea		1962–present
National Dance Company Wales	contemporary	Cardiff Bay	Wales	Founders Roy Campbell-Moore & Ann Sholem; AD Ann Sholem	1983–present
National Opera and Ballet	ballet	Sofia	Bulgaria		1928–present
Nederlands Dans Theater	contemporary	The Hague	Netherlands	Founders Benjamin Harkarvy, Aart Verstegen & Carel Birnie; AD Jim Vincent; Choreographers Jiří Kylián, Paul Lightfoot & Sol León	1959–present
New Adventures	contemporary	Sadler's Wells Theatre, London	England	AD Matthew Bourne	2002–present
New York Baroque Dance Company	historical ballet	New York City	United States	AD Catherine Turocy	1976–present
New York City Ballet	ballet	New York City	United States	Founders George Balanchine & Lincoln Kirstein	1948–present
New York Theatre Ballet	ballet	New York City	United States	Founder & AD Diana Byer	1978–present
The New Zealand Dance Company	contemporary dance	Auckland	New Zealand	Co-founders Shona McCullagh and Frances Turner	2011–present
Northern Ballet (formerly Northern Ballet Theatre)	ballet	Leeds	England	Founder Laverne Meye; rAD David Nixon	1969–present
Nunzio Impellizzeri Dance Company	contemporary	Zürich	Switzerland	Founder Nunzio Impellizzeri	2014–present
NW Fusion Dance Company	jazz, modern & tap dance	Portland, Oregon	United States	Founder & AD Brad Hampton	2008–present
Oakville Ballet Company	ballet	Oakville, Ontario	Canada	AD Amanda Bayliss	current
ODC/Dance	contemporary	San Francisco, California	United States	Founder & AD Brenda Way	1971–present
Oregon Ballet Theatre	ballet	Portland, Oregon	United States	Founder James Canfield Interim AD Anne Mueller	1989–present
Pacific Northwest Ballet	ballet	Seattle	United States	Founders Kent Stowell & Francia Russell; AD Peter Boal	1972–present
Paradosi Ballet Company	Christian dance company	Tacoma, Washington	United States	Founders Joel & Tennille Carver; AD Larissa BIschoff	2007–present
Paris Opera Ballet (Ballet de l'Opéra national de Paris)	ballet	Paris	France	Director Brigitte Lefèvre as of Oct. 15, 2015 Benjamin Millepied	1669–present
Parsons Dance Company	contemporary	New York City	United States	Founder David Parsons	1985–present
Patti Rutland Jazz	contemporary jazz & hip-hop	Dothan, Alabama	United States	Founder Patti Rutland	2005–present
Paul Taylor Dance Company	modern	New York City	United States	Founder Paul Taylor	1954–present
Pennsylvania Ballet	ballet	Philadelphia, Pennsylvania	United States	Founder Barbara Weisberger	1963–present
Les Percussions de Guinée	traditional		Guinea		1987–present
Philippine Ballet Theatre	classical ballet	Metro Manila	Philippines		1987–present
Pick Up Performance Company		New York City	United States	Choreographer David Gordon	1971–present
Pilobolus	modern	Washington Depot, Connecticut	United States	AD Robby Barnett	1971–present
Pittsburgh Ballet Theatre	ballet	Pittsburgh, Pennsylvania	United States	Founders Nicolas Petrov, Frederic Franklin	1968–present
Placer Theatre Ballet	ballet	Placer County, California	United States	Founder & AD Pat Colgate	current
Prince Dance Group		Berhampur, Orissa	India	T. Krishna Mohan Reddy	current
Provincial Dances	modern	Yekaterinburg, Sverdlovsk Oblast	Russia	Founder Tatiana Baganava	1990–present
Queensland Ballet (formerly Lisner Ballet Company)	ballet	Brisbane	Australia	Founder Charles Lisner; AD François Klaus	1960–present
Raks Geek	belly dance	Chicago, Illinois	United States	Founder Dawn Xiana Moon	2012–present
Rambert Dance Company	contemporary	London	England	Founder Dame Marie Rambert; AD Mark Baldwin	1926–present
Remix Dance Project	contemporary, integrated	Cape Town	South Africa	Founders Nicola Visser, Malcolm Black	2000–present
Rennie Harris Puremovement	hip hop	Pittsburgh, Pennsylvania	United States	Founder Rennie Harris	1992–present
Restless Dance Theatre (formerly Restless Dance Company)	contemporary, integrated	Adelaide	Australia	Founders Sally Chance, Tania Rose; AD Philip Channells	1991–present
Richard Alston Dance Company	contemporary	London	England	AD Richard Alston	1994–present
Ririe-Woodbury Dance Company	contemporary	Salt Lake City, Utah	United States	Joan Woodbury & Shirley Ririe	1964–present
Riverdance	Irish Dance	Dublin	Ireland	Composer Bill Whelan Producer Moya Doherty Director John McColgan	1995–present
The Rockettes	precision dance, various	New York City	United States	Founder Russell Markert	1925–present
The Royal Ballet	classical ballet	London	England	Founder Dame Ninette de Valois; Choreographers Sir Frederick Ashton, Wayne McGregor (current)	1931–present
Royal Danish Ballet	ballet	Copenhagen	Denmark	AD Nikolaj Hübbe	1748–present
Royal New Zealand Ballet	ballet	Wellington	New Zealand		1953–present
Royal Swedish Ballet (formerly Swedish Opera Ballet)	ballet	Stockholm	Sweden	AD Madeleine Onne	1773–present
Royal Winnipeg Ballet	ballet	Winnipeg, Manitoba	Canada	AD André Lewis	1939–present
Sacramento Ballet	ballet	Sacramento, California	United States	Founders Barbara Crockett & Deane Crockett	1954–present
The Rubberbodies Collective	experimental		Malta	2009–present	
San Francisco Ballet	ballet	San Francisco, California	United States	AD Helgi Tomasson	1933–present
Savannah Danse Theatre	ballet	Savannah, Georgia	United States	Founder Suzanne Braddy	1998–present
School at Jacob's Pillow (The)	ballet, contemporary traditions, cultural traditions, tap/musical theatre	Becket, Massachusetts	United States	Ted Shawn	1931–present
Scottish Ballet (formerly Western Theatre Ballet)	ballet	Glasgow	Scotland	AD Ashley Page	1957–present
Scottish Dance Theatre	contemporary	Dundee	Scotland	AD Janet Smith	1986–present
Sensedance	contemporary	New York City	United States	AD Henning Rübsam	1991–present
Serbian Cultural Association Oplenac	folk dance	Mississauga	Canada		1987–present
Shanghai Ballet Company	ballet	Shanghai	China		1966–present
Shobana Jeyasingh Dance Company	contemporary	London	England	AD & Choreographer Shobana Jeyasingh	1988–present
The Silver Belles	tap	Harlem	United States		
Siobhan Davies Dance	contemporary	London	England	Founder Siobhan Davies	1989–present
sjDANCEco	contemporary	San Jose, California	United States	Founders Gary Masters and Maria Basile	2003–present
Snappy Dance Theater	postmodern	Cambridge, Massachusetts	United States	AD Martha Mason	1996–present
St Petersburg Ballet Theatre	classical ballet	Saint Petersburg	Russia	Founder Konstantin Tachkin	1994–present
Stephen Petronio Company	contemporary	New York City, New York	United States	AD Stephen Petronio	1984–present
Stuttgart Ballet	ballet	Stuttgart	Germany	AD Reid Anderson	1609–present
Suzanne Farrell Ballet	ballet	Washington, D.C.	United States	Founder Suzanne Farrell	2000–present
Sydney Dance Company	contemporary	Sydney	Australia	Founder Suzanne Musitz; AD Rafael Bonachela	1969–present
Tanztheater Reinhild Hoffmann	Tanztheater	Hamburg (1978–86), Bochum (1986–1995)	Germany	Founder & AD Reinhild Hoffmann	1978–1995
Tanztheater Wuppertal Pina Bausch (formerly Wuppertal Opera Ballet)	Tanztheater	Wuppertal	Germany	AD (former) Pina Bausch, Dominique Mercy & Robert Sturm	1973–present
El Teatro de Danza Contemporanea de El Salvador	contemporary	Washington, D.C. and San Salvador	United States and San Salvador	Founders Miya Hisaka Silva & Francisco Castillo	1994–present
Tori Lawrence + Co.	contemporary	Western Massachusetts	United States	Tori Lawrence	2010–present
Toronto Dance Theatre	contemporary	Toronto, Ontario	Canada	AD Christopher House	1968–present
Touch Compass	professional inclusive dance company	Auckland	Aotearoa New Zealand	Founding dancers includePelenakeke Brown, Lusi Faiva, Rodney Bell	1997–present
Tracks Dance	contemporary	Darwin, Northern Territory	Australia		1994–present
Tripunithura Kathakali Kendram Ladies Troupe	Kathakali	Tripunithura, Kerala	India		1975–present
Trey McIntyre Project	contemporary ballet	Boise, Idaho	United States	Founder & AD Trey McIntyre	2008–present
Tulsa Ballet	ballet	Tulsa, Oklahoma	United States	AD Marcello Angelini	1956–present
tumàka't Contemporary Dance	contemporary		Mexico	Founder Vania Duran	2007–present
Urban Bush Women	various	Brooklyn, New York	United States	Founder Jawole Jo Zollar.	1984
Vienna State Ballet	ballet	Vienna	Austria		
Washington Ballet	ballet	Washington, D.C.	United States	Founder Mary Day; AD Septime Webre	1976–present
West Australian Ballet	ballet	Perth	Australia	Founder Madame Kira Bousloff	1952–present
Whim W'Him	contemporary	Seattle, WA	United States	Founder Olivier Wevers	2009–present
White Oak Dance Project	modern		United States	Founders Mark Morris & Mikhail Baryshnikov	1990–2002
Whitey's Lindy Hoppers	swing	Harlem, New York City	United States	Founder Herbert "Whitey" White	1935–1942
Yacobson Ballet	ballet		Russia	Founder Leonid Yacobson	1969–present
Yin Mei Dance	contemporary	New York City	United States	Founder Yin Mei	1995–present
Zero Visibility Corp	contemporary	Oslo	Norway	Founders Ina Christel Johannessen & Jens Sethzman	1996–present

== See also ==
- List of ballet companies in the United States
- List of dancers
- List of folk dance performance groups
