= List of dance companies in Canada =

There are many dance companies in Canada. Listed are some of the professional dance companies.

== List ==
Company	Style	Based in city/region	Province	Founder Artistic director (AD) Choreographer	Active
Alberta Ballet Company	Ballet	Calgary	Alberta	Founder Ruth Carse; AD Jean Grand-Maître	early 1950s–present
Atlantic Ballet Theatre of Canada	Ballet	Moncton	New Brunswick	Founder Susan Chalmers-Gauvin; AD Igor Dobrovolskiy	2002–present
Ballet BC	Contemporary ballet	Vancouver	British Columbia	Founders Jean Orr, David Y.H. Lui and Sheila Baggs; AD Emily Molnar	1986–present
Ballet Jörgen Canada	Ballet		Ontario	AD Bengt Jörgen	1987–present
Bavarian Schuhplattlers of Edmonton	German and Austrian folk	Edmonton	Alberta		1971–present
Chai Folk Ensemble	Israeli folk	Winnipeg	Manitoba	Founder Sarah Sommer	1964–present
Cheremosh Ukrainian Dance Company	Ukrainian	Edmonton	Alberta	Founder Chester & Luba Kuc; AD Mykola Kanevets	1969–present
Corpus				Founders David Danzon and Sylvie Bouchard	1997–present
Corpuscule Dance	Contemporary; disability	Montreal	Quebec	Marie-Hélène Bellavance	
Fila 13 Productions	Contemporary	Montreal	Quebec	Founder: Lina Cruz AD: Lina Cruz	2003 - present
Les Grands Ballets Canadiens	Ballet	Montreal	Quebec	Founder Ludmilla Chiriaeff; AD Ivan Cavallari	1957–present
Le Groupe Dance Lab	Contemporary	Montreal and Ottawa	Quebec and Ontario	Founder Jeanne Renaud; AD Peter Boneham	1966–2009
Holy Body Tattoo	Contemporary	Vancouver	British Columbia	Founders and ADs Noam Gagnon, Dana Gingras, and Jean-Yves Thériault	1993-unknown
Kidd Pivot	Contemporary	Vancouver	British Columbia	Founder and AD Crystal Pite	2002–present
Kokoro Dance	Butoh	Vancouver	British Columbia	Founders and ADs Barbara Bourget and Jay Hirabayashi	1986–present
La La La Human Steps	Contemporary	Montreal	Quebec	Founder Édouard Lock	1980–2015
Louise Bédard Danse	Contemporary	Montreal	Quebec	Founder Louise Bédard	1990–present
MascallDance	Contemporary	Vancouver	British Columbia	Founder Jennifer Mascall	1989–present
Menaka Thakkar Dance Company	Indian classical	Toronto	Ontario	Founded Menaka Thakkar	1984–present
Motus O dance theatre	Contemporary	Stouffville	Ontario	Founders- Cynthia Croker, James Croker, Gary Kirkham, Jack Langenhuizen, Beth Newell, Natalie Radford.	1990–present
National Ballet of Canada	Ballet	Toronto	Ontario	Founder Celia Franca; AD Karen Kain	1951–present
Oakville Ballet Company	Ballet	Oakville	Ontario	AD Amanda Bayliss	current
Royal Winnipeg Ballet	Ballet	Winnipeg	Manitoba	Founders Gweneth Lloyd and Betty Farrally, AD André Lewis	1939–present
Toronto Dance Theatre	Contemporary	Toronto	Ontario	Founders Peter Randazzo, Patricia Beatty and David Earle AD Christopher House	1968–present
Ukrainian Shumka Dancers	Ukrainian	Edmonton	Alberta	Founder Chester Kuc; AD Les Sereda	1959–present
Québec Ballet – Le Ballet du Québec	Ballet	Quebec	Quebec	Christiane Bélanger	2001–present
Mascall Dance Society	Contemporary	Vancouver	British Columbia	Founder Jennifer Mascall	1982–present

== Notes ==
The Canadian Encyclopedia lists some other companies:

- Max Wyman (2015-03-04), "Anna Wyman Dance Theatre", The Canadian Encyclopedia
- Michael Crabb; Linde Howe-Beck (2015-03-04), "Les Ballets Jazz de Montréal", The Canadian Encyclopedia
- Michael Crabb (2015-04-03), "Ottawa Ballet", The Canadian Encyclopedia
