= Kambras =

Music and dance-theatren company in Argentina

Kambras, formerly CETA, was a music and dance-theatre company based at Buenos Aires, Argentina. Formerly known as CETA, it was established in 2005, and renamed in 2011 for the presentation of their first short film Pixilation II

Kambras was an independent collective of Argentine Tango dancers, musicians, technicians and media artists. It was led by Gonzalo Orihuela, Julián Rodriguez Orihuela and Solange Chapperon. Their intent was to have a more different, cosmopolitan and contemporary approach to tango dance than other existing tango dance companies. In particular, the company has been known to continuously bring new and refreshing ideas in to the standstill tango performance scene.

== Director ==
Gonzalo Orihuela is a South African born Argentine blogger, teacher and choreographer of Argentine tango. Born in 1980. He is regarded as part of the vanguard of scenic tango, and he is best known for his pieces created with the group.

== Performers ==
- Diego Mauriño guest actor
- Julian Hahn Musician
- Julian Rodriguez Orihuela actor and musician
- Juan Fosatti dancer and musician
- Mayumi Urgino musician
- Natalia Fures dancer and musician
- Pablo Rodriguez dancer and musician
- Solange Chapperon dancer
- Claudio Del Bianco Light design
- Anibal Tonianez sound technician and musician

It dissolved in 2016 after producing 4 dance pieces, two of which have toured internationally, and 1 animation film. Their performances have the goal of breaking down the barriers between dance, theatre, and music.

== Current repertoire ==
- El Sonido de las Caricias
- Cram

== Other theatrical creations ==
- 1905 Tango (2011) Created under request to be performed in La Bombonera
- Resurección

== Films, clips and spots ==
- Pixilation II
- Banquito
- Menage a Trois
- Pixilation

== Reception ==
The Buenos Aires Theatre specialized magazine SobreBUE said "Un verdadero hallazgo dentro de la cartelera teatral de la ciudad. Cram se desarrolla en una extraña conjugación de representación, baile, música y humor, expresado en un idioma universal, el arte".

== Notes and references ==
- "Tangauta interview" (April - 2013)
- "Balletin Dance " (March 2013)
- "Tangodanza - German" (2010)
- "Argentine Tango - Dance Research Centre" (2008)
- "Buenos Aires Heralds"(2008)
- "Alternativa Teatral "
- "Interview in KadmusArts "
- "Planeando sobre Bue (pag5) "
