= SjDANCEco =

Dance company in San Jose US

sjDANCEco

General information
- Name: sjDANCEco
- Year founded: 2003
- Founders: Gary Masters; Maria Basile; Melanie Doerner
- Principal venue: The California Theatre
- Website: www.sjdanceco.org

Senior staff
- Chief Executive: Gary Masters
- Coordinator: Melanie Doerner
- Company manager: Julia Booker
- Choreographic Advisor: Fred Mathews

Artistic staff
- Artistic Director: Gary Masters; Maria Basile
- Music Director: Barbara Day Turner
- Principal Conductor: Barbara Day Turner
- Resident Choreographers: Gary Masters; Maria Basile; Hsiang-Hsiu Lin
- Company Dancers: Maria Basile; Dominic Duong; Kelisha Gardeen; Katherine House; Amanda Lacro; Hsiang-Hsiu Lin; Gabriel Mata; Frankie Rivera; Hannah Vaughan

Other
- Orchestra: San José Chamber Orchestra

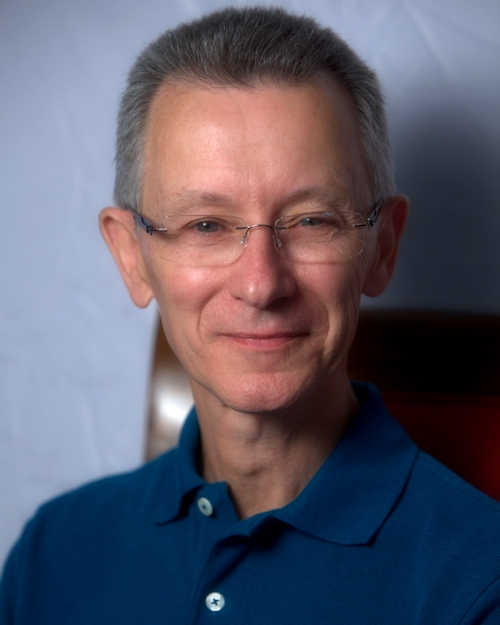
Gary Masters, sjDANCEco co-founder and co-artistic director

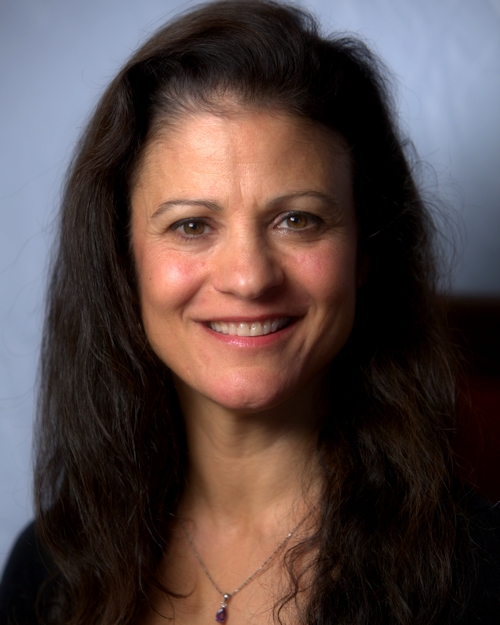
Maria Basile, sjDANCEco co-founder and co-artistic director

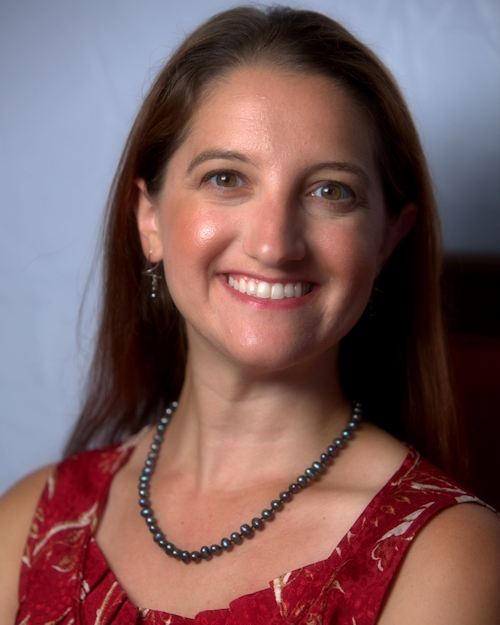
Julia Booker, sjDANCEco company manager

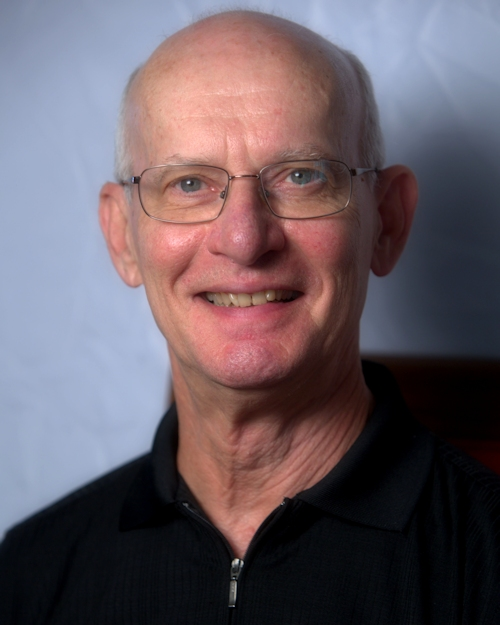
Fred Mathews, sjDANCEco choreographic advisor

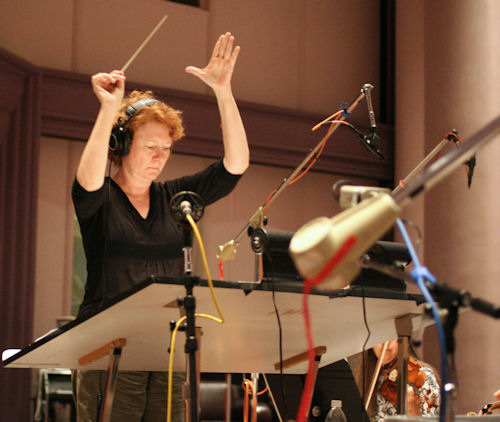
Barbara Day Turner, sjDANCEco music director and principal conductor

Based in San Jose, California, sjDANCEco is a contemporary dance company founded in 2003 by artistic directors Gary Masters and Maria Basile, and Melanie Doerner. The sjDANCEco is in residence at the San Jose State University.

The sjDANCEco evolved out of the San Jose-based Limón West Dance Project, which Gary Masters founded and directed from 1994 to 1998, with present-day sjDANCEco dancers Maria Basile, Hsiang Hsiu Lin, Raphaël Boumaïla and Robert Regala. During its first 10 years, sjDANCEco has presented 42 World Premieres, six Revivals, works by master choreographers Donald McKayle and Fred Mathews, and eight works by José Limón during a five-year collaboration with the José Limón Dance Foundation. In addition, sjDANCEco also provides two annual showcases for new works by professional San Francisco Bay Area choreographers through its two annual ChoreoProject Awards and through its "FESTIVAL @ SANTANA ROW", celebrating National Dance Week.

The sjDANCEco is a 501(c)(3) non-profit organization that serves both the community of San Francisco South Bay residents and the community of local dance artists. They introduce new audiences to dance and strive to install a lasting appreciation for the art form.

== Selected performances ==
- Tango Fatal (2013)
- The Moor's Pavane (2012)

== See also ==
- List of Dance Companies
