= Corpus (dance troupe) =

Canadian dance company

Corpus is a Canadian dance company whose work often combines humour with dance. Besides major productions, they often perform in schools, and are co-creators of the Treehouse TV series 4 Square. They have performed thousands of shows internationally since their founding in 1997 by David Danzon and Sylvie Bouchard.

== Awards ==
- Dora Mavor Moore Award nomination: Outstanding Choreography for Rendez-vous (2000)
- Dora Mavor Moore Award nomination: Outstanding Performance for Rendez-vous (2000)
- Dora Mavor Moore Award nomination: Outstanding Choreography for Nuit blanche (2002)
- Dora Mavor Moore Award nomination: Outstanding Choreography for Les moutons (2003)
- Féderation Culturelle Canadienne Française Winner: Prix Hommage for Arts (2002)
- IV Games of la francophonie Gold Medal Winner (2001)
