= Nunzio Impellizzeri =

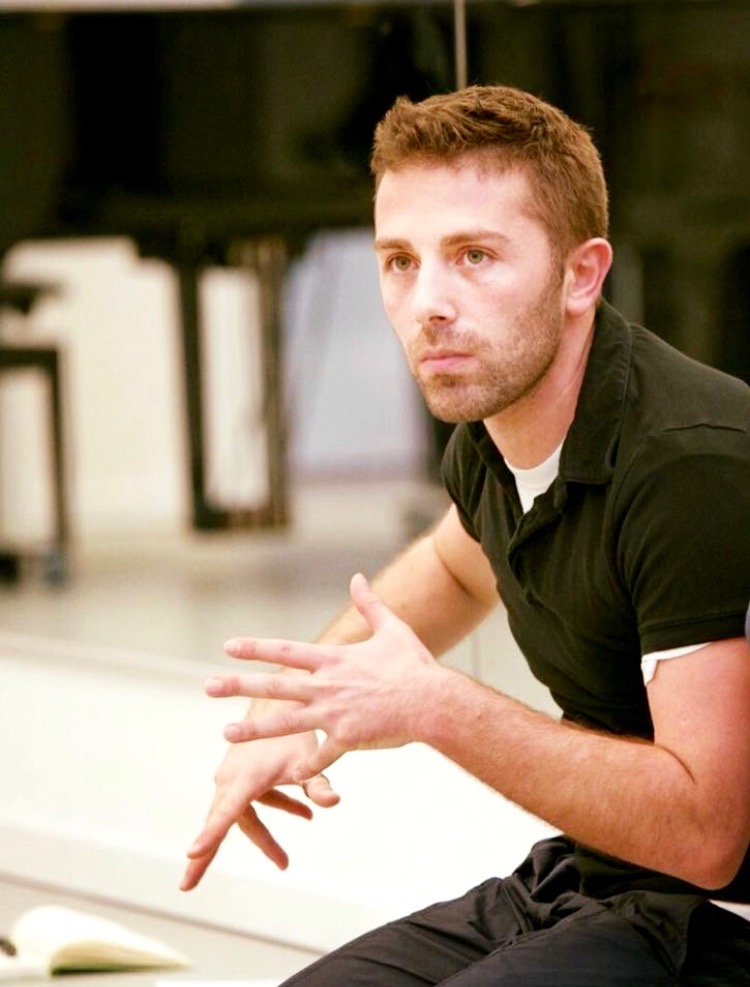
Impellizzeri in 2016

Nunzio Impellizzeri (born 7 May 1980) is an Italian-Swiss choreographer. He is based in Zürich.

== Early life and education ==
Impellizzeri was born in 1980 in Acireale. He completed his studies in Visual Art at the Istituto Statale D’Arte di Giarre in Italy. After discovered dancing he began to study and practice dance at the pedagogical project MoDem improving his skills in classic and contemporary dance.

== Early career ==
In 2000, Impellizzeri began his dancing career as a soloist with the Compagnia Zappalà Danza directed by Roberto Zappalà in Sicily.

From 2004 to 2005 he has worked in Spain with the Compañia Metros Dansa directed by Ramón Oller Martínez; in Austria and Switzerland as a soloist dancer he worked with the choreographers Jacqueline Beck for the Walk Tanztheater Project Peter Bichsel in 2006 and the choreographer Kinsun Chan; from 2006 to 2007 in Germany for the ballet of the Theater Augsburg and for the Stadttheater Kempten Allgäu directed by Jochen Heckmann.

== Career ==
Impellizzeri began his choreographic career in Italy in collaboration with the Theater Company Gruppo Iarba for Le mille e una notte in 2003, the Genius Loci and Studio Ferrera with Terre Laviche in 2004. In 2011, in Germany, he cooperated with Giorgio Madia and the Cottbus Staatstheater in the creation of Harlequin, which plays with the tradition of the Italian Commedia dell'arte. In Switzerland, in 2009, on behalf of Gisela Rocha Dance Company, in 2010 for the Faa-Zone Dance Company, in 2006 for Cinevox Junior Dance Company, in 2008 for the ZTTS of Zürich, from 2008 to 2013 for the SZZ_Junior Company and in 2015 for the ZHdK: BA Contemporary Dance.

In 2009, Impellizzeri was one of the four choreographers chosen for the review 12 Min. Max. at the Tanzhaus Zürich. In 2010, he was selected amongst six other choreographers for "SiWiC 2010" – (The 14th Swiss International Coaching Project for Choreographers) directed by Reinhild Hoffmann. He participated in ChoreoLab 2013 in Zürich and in Warsaw, directed by Tanzhaus Zürich and Centrum W RU-CHU Warsaw.

In 2012 and in 2013, Impellizzeri won the choreographic competition Ballet-ex in Rome. In 2014, he founded the Nunzio Impellizzeri Dance Company of which he is the artistic director. He created Quieta... inquietudine, a short dance video in 2014, which received the public award 60secondsdance, during Loikka Dance Film Festival 2016 in Finland. Lost & Found which was performed at Tanzhaus Zürich and Way Out which premiered in Theater am Gleis (Winterthur, Switzerland) and Grabenhalle (St. Gallen, Switzerland) in 2015. In 2016, he was invited to create two works "#Il-prete Rosso" and "Bleeding heart" for the ZHdK/BA Contemporary Dance. In the same year, he was appointed to choreograph "Happening" for the Opening of Zürich Landesmuseum. In 2017, for the Nunzio Impellizzeri Dance Company in collaboration with the composer Selma Mutal, Nunzio has directed and choreographed “IN.QUIETA ROOMS”

In 2018, Impellizzeri coproduced by Tanzhaus Zürich, Nunzio Impellizzeri created CORPO BAROCCO, based on the question of why the imperfect can be so fascinatingly beautiful (see baroque imagery) "choreographer Nunzio Impellizzeri develops the 60-minute evening that leaves the audience almost as breathless as the extremely demanding dancers. But during the one hour, one succumbs to a spell, a fascination that one feels almost physically. An intense experience!" (Kaspar Sannemann - Oper-aktuell).

From 2006 to 2019, Impellizzeri has taught workshops and classes for the Art Garage (Naples, IT), Steps Academia de Danzas (Panama City), Steve lachance Ballet & Friends (Rome, IT), ZHdK/ BA Contemporary Dance (Zürich, CH), Jessica Iwanson International School of Contemporary Dance (Munich, DE), Profitraining Tanzbüro Basel (Basel, CH), Ballettschule Theater Basel (Basel, CH), Cinevox Junior Dance Company (Neuhausen am Rheinfall), Staatstheater Cottbus, Progetto danza (Catania, IT), Theater St. Gallen (St. Gallen, CH), Tanzhaus Zürich (Zürich, CH), Zurich-Tanz-Theater-Schule (Zurich, CH), Tanzwerk 101 (Zürich, CH).

== Works (overview) ==
- "Essence (=) Interference" (Cinevox Junior Dance Company, CH - 2006)
- "Sand's Creatures" (Youth America Grand Prix / Ballet Center Zürich, NY/USA - 2006)
- "Bitte, ich!" (Zürich Tanz-Theater-Schule, Rigiblick Theater - CH - 2008)
- "Here she comes" (Tanzolymp Berlin, D - 2009)
- "In Attachment..." (12 Min. Max., Tanzhaus Zürich, CH - 2009)
- "Just Begin... Aber Pünktlich!" (Faa-Zone Dance Company, Theater am Gleis, CH - 2010)
- "Attending... for devotion" (Teatro Orione - Roma, IT - 2012)
- "Water Resistant" (Centrum W Ruchu / Varsau, PL - 2013)
- "Quieta... Inquietudine" (Nunzio Impellizzeri Dance Company, Loikka Dance Film Festival / 60secondsdance competition, Helsinki - 2014)
- "Lost & Found" (Nunzio Impellizzeri Dance Company, Tanzhaus Zürich, CH - 2015)
- "WAY OUT" (Nunzio Impellizzeri Dance Company, Theater am Gleis, CH - 2015)
- "HAPPENING" (Nunzio Impellizzeri Dance Company, Zürich Landesmuseum, CH - 2016)
- "#il-prete-rosso" (Zürcher Hochschule der Künste, CH - 2016)
- "Bleeding Heart" (Zürcher Hochschule der Künste, CH - 2016)
- "IN.QUIETA ROOMS" (Nunzio Impellizzeri Dance Company, Theater am Gleis, CH - 2017)
- "CORPO BAROCCO" (Nunzio Impellizzeri Dance Company, Tanzhaus Zürich, CH - 2018)
- "Nun te scurdà" (Human Bodies / Artgarge Pozzuoli - IT - 2019)
- "PLEASE, HOLD ME" (Nunzio Impellizzeri Dance Company, Kulturmarkt Zürich, CH - 2020)
- "MURMURIU" (LaMov danza, Zaragoza, SP - 2021)
- "SCH.NEE" (Nunzio Impellizzeri Dance Company, Kulturmarkt Zürich, CH - 2022)
- "CIRCOLANDO" (Cie. Marchepie, Lausanne, CH - 2024)
- "PINK CARPET" (Nunzio Impellizzeri Dance Company, Kulturhaus Helferei Zürich, CH - 2024)
- "FLAM.ME.UM" (Anhaltisches Theater Dessau, D - 2025)
