= Tori Lawrence + Co. =

American contemporary dance company

Tori Lawrence + Co. is a Western Massachusetts contemporary dance company founded in 2010 by choreographer and filmmaker Tori Lawrence. They frequently perform site-oriented pieces.

== Art residencies and fellowships ==
Tori Lawrence + Co. dance residencies and fellowships include USF Verftet in Bergen, Norway; Brunakra in Sweden; Dance Ireland; and Budapest's Workshop Foundation.

Her dance films have been included in Stockholm Screendance Festival, Portland Maine Film Festival and Green Mountain Film Festival.

== Artistic Collaborators ==
Principal artists in her pieces include:

Ellie Goudie-Averill
Jenna Riegel
Jungwoong Kim
Anthony Pucci
Ainsley Tharp
Nathaniel Moore
Taryn Griggs
Marie Lynn Haas
Emily Climer
Seth Wenger
Cole Bejelić
Vicki Brown
Bing & Ruth

== Selected performance history ==
The company's performances are often site-specific to particular locations:

Awakened Ruins (2011)
Holding Place (2012-2015)
Field Made White (2016)
Progress (2018)
Junkspace (2014-2018)
Sjøradio (2023)
