= American Chamber Ballet =

The American Chamber Ballet was a troupe of 15 professional dancers founded by Joel Benjamin.

Though they operating out of Carnegie Hall, the company rehearsed at Trutti Gasparinetti's studio. They performed and toured throughout the United States during the 1970s.

The company was presented by Kazuko Hillyer International and Pacific World Artists, with nearly 100 performances scheduled in its final year; the group disbanded due to financial difficulties in 1976.

== Former dancers ==
- Shelagh McKenna
- Audrey Ross
- Lawrence Leritz
- Toni Ann Gardella
- Trutti Gasparinetti
- Takuya Horimoto
- Denise Plouffe
- Ernesta Corvino
