= Motora =

Motora is a folk dance group from Eastern Finland, city of Joensuu. Motora is specialized in Karelian folk dance. Karelia is a frontier; it is partly in Finland, partly in Russia. The influences of eastern and western cultures can be seen in Motora's dance.

There are traditional and modern choreographies in Motora's repertoire. Motora was founded by Rauni and Sakari Riikonen in 1968.

Motora has an own band, Rälläkkä. Kaakkurit are another music band; It is a group of five players, who also dance in the Kapsakat dance group.

There are over 170 dancers all together in Motora. There are groups for children, youngsters and adults. Dancers are from 3 to 40 years of age. All dancers practise their dances in "Motti" which is Motora's own dance hall in the center of Joensuu.

Motora has performed in Finland's biggest festivals: Kaustinen Folk Music Festival, Pispalan Sottiisi and Folklandia. Motora has made 20 trips abroad to 15 different countries such as the United States, Hungary, Germany, Russia, Switzerland, Lithuania, Romania, Denmark, Cyprus.

== Kapsakat ==
Kapsakat is a Motora group of fourteen 17 to 21-year-old young dancers. Many of them have danced for over ten years. Kapsakat perform a lot at many events and parties. They have also been very successful in regional and national competitions. Mostly they have been classified to the best category, gold series.

Kapsakat has also performed a lot abroad at different festivals and camps: 2002 Sweden, 2004 Hungary, 2005 Russia, France, 2006 Sweden, 2008 Northern Cyprus, 2009 Estonia and Hungary.

The word motora, is also a word used by some Hispanic cultures when referring to a motorcycle.

== Karelian folk dances ==
Rhythm and joy are typical for Karelian dance. Dancers express their feelings strongly and emotionally. They have a chance to improve to show their real emotions.
