= Jennifer Wootton Mascall =

Dance choreographer, performer and teacher

Jennifer Wootton Mascall (born December 11, 1952) is a modern dance choreographer, performer, and teacher. After completing a formal training at York University, she went on to work with several dance companies, and as an independent dancer and choreographer in parts of Europe, the U.S. and Canada. She is the founder and artistic director of Vancouver dance company Mascall Dance Society where she teaches and choreographs.

== Education and training ==
Mascall graduated with a bachelor of fine arts from York University, in 1974. She was a member of the first graduating class of this research-based dance school. She trained formally in many disciplines of human movement. In 1998, under the guidance of Bonnie Bainbridge, Mascall completed certification as a "Body-Mind Centering Practitioner". In 2005 and 2012, she travelled to India to train in Hatha Yoga. Additionally, Mascall trained with Judith Koltai in "authentic movement" and extensively with Linda Putnam of the Evergreen Theatre School. Two of her other modern dance teachers were Twyla Tharp and Merce Cunningham.

== Early career ==
Mascall's first work as a choreographer was "Attica", in 1974. During this year, she also initiated GRID, a dance company in Downtown Toronto which put on productions at specific sites throughout the city; these performances highlighted the environments in which they occurred.

Mascall went on to perform with Douglas Dunn's Lazy Madge company in 1977 and 1978. She participated in the first Canadian National Choreographic Seminar: an event hosted by Grant Strate, in 1978. Additionally during this period, she worked independently as a solo dancer and choreographer in Canada, the US and parts of Europe.

In 1979, Mascall collected and published "Footnotes". The work was produced and bound independently as a sampler of wide-ranging choreographic notation methods and voices of the period. In 1980, Jennifer headed to Vancouver and joined the Paula Ross Dance Company

Mascall, along with six other innovative choreographers founded the collective EDAM (Experimental Dance and Music), in 1982. This Vancouver-based dance school continues today and is committed to the investigation of movement itself as an expressive art form.

== The Mascall Dance Society ==
The Mascall Dance Society is based in St. Paul's Anglican Church in Vancouver's West End; the group hosts a number of different performances and classes throughout the year. Though the Mascall Dance Society was initially founded in 1982; it was largely inactive until 1989 when it was rekindled. The Society has since worked with hundreds of artists, creating live performance, films, and videos.

While Jennifer Mascall works as the company's primary choreographer, the society also mentors emerging artists and new choreographers. The organization's mandates include: promoting the public appreciation of and exposure to dance and its related arts; researching human movement and physical motivation; and educating dancers and the public in modern dance traditions, history, technique, and discoveries. The Nijinsky Gibber Jazz Club is an annual improvisation research ensemble. It was started in 1990, during the early days of the Mascall Dance Society. Dancers are accompanied by live DJs, musicians or spoken word artists. The Nijinsky Gibber Jazz Club is performed in bars, churches, streets, and other atypical venues for which such an event to take place.

The Way Out West (WOW) Summer Intensive has been held since 2003. It's focused on introducing the uninitiated and enabling dancers to deepen their existing artistic practice. Traces of Emily Carr is a multi-media portrait based on the life, art and writings of Canadian artist, Emily Carr (1871–1945). Traces of Emily Carr has toured across Canada, through the highlands of Scotland and performed at the Spoleto Festival in Italy.

Since 2009, Mascall Dance has maintained a blog titled, "Talk: Dance as an Art Form"
