= Serbian Cultural Association Oplenac =

Canadian cultural organization

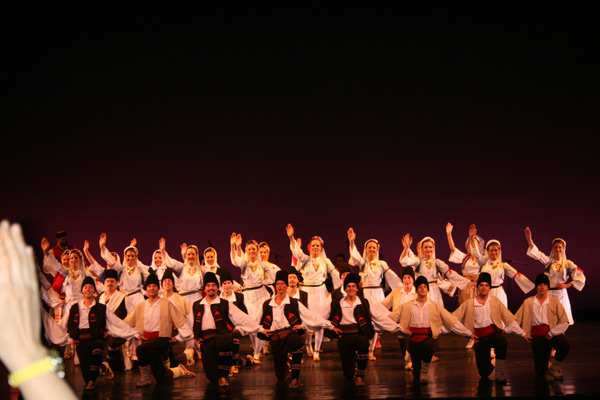
Oplenac concert in San Diego, 2012

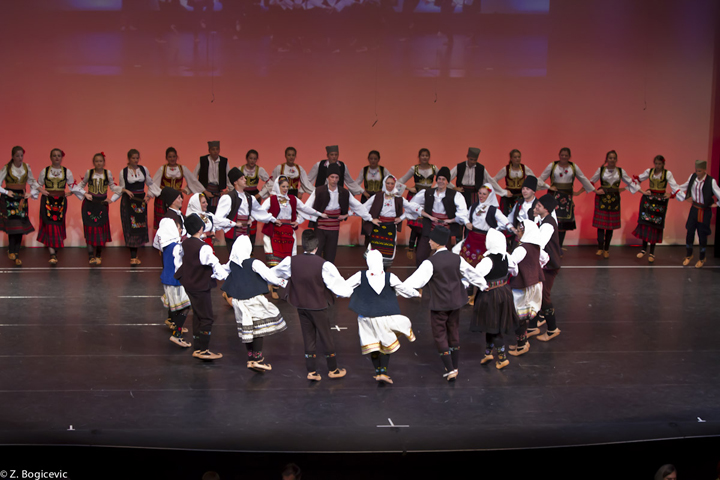
Oplenac concert in Mississauga, 2012

Serbian Cultural Association Oplenac (Serbian: СКУД Опленац) is a Canadian organization dedicated to preserving and presenting Serbian cultural heritage through dance and music. Oplenac was founded in 1987 in Mississauga, Ontario. Serbian folk dancing has been a major activity in SCA Oplenac since its founding as a non-profit organization in 1987.

The association claims to be the largest Serbian folklore group in North America. Oplenac representative ensemble has been organizing concerts across Canada and the US since 1996, performing in Chicago, Los Angeles, San Diego, San Francisco, Sacramento, Toronto, Mississauga, Windsor, and Kitchener.
