= Joel Benjamin (singer) =

American singer and dancer

Joel Benjamin is an American singer and dancer who performed as a child actor, dancer, and singer in seven Broadway theatre productions in the 1960s including Bells are Ringing and The Music Man.

In 1970, Joel Benjamin took over as director of the New Repertory Dance Theatre. He was then director of American Chamber Ballet until it disbanded in 1977, and since that time has specialized in massage therapy for dancers.
