= Danza Voluminosa =

Cuban dance troupe

- Born: Havana, Cuba
- Movement: Cuban culture Performing arts Modern dance

Danza Voluminosa is a professional dance troupe composed exclusively of obese dancers, founded by choreographer and dancer Juan Miguel Mas in 1996. Although originally faced with ridicule, the troupe has become more popular over decades of activity, and have even performed in the National Theatre of Cuba.

Most dancers with Danza Voluminosa have been women, but historically the troupe has included male dancers from time to time. The troupe was the subject of a Canadian documentary Defying Gravity, in 2004. They are particularly well known for their humorous rendition of Swan Lake.
