= Menaka Thakkar =

Indo-Canadian dancer, choreographer (1942–2022)

- Born: 3 March 1942; Mumbai, India
- Died: 5 February 2022 (aged 79)
- Occupation(s): Dancer; Choreographer; Instructor
- Career
- Current group: Menaka Thakkar Dance Company

Menaka Thakkar (March 3, 1942 - February 5, 2022) was an Indo-Canadian dancer, choreographer, and teacher who specialized in Indian classical dance. Based in Toronto, Ontario, Thakkar taught and performed across Canada and around the world. She was awarded Canada's Governor General's Performing Arts Award for Lifetime Artistic Achievement in 2013. In 2019 she was inducted into Dance Collection Danse's Dance Hall of Fame.

== Early life and education ==
Thakkar was born in Mumbai, India, on March 3, 1942. In Mumbai, Madras, and Cuttack, she completed training in Indian classical dance (including Bharatanatyam, Odissi, and Kuchipudi styles). She earned an undergraduate degree in visual arts in 1963.

Thakkar performed as a soloist in India. She travelled to Canada in 1972 to visit her brother and to perform. She decided to settle in the country the following year, joining her brother Rasesh Thakkar and their sister in Toronto.

== Career ==
=== Teaching ===
Thakkar founded Nrtyakala: The Canadian Academy of Indian Dance in Toronto in 1974. For a decade, she taught dance intensives across Canada. She also taught a course in Indian dance as an adjunct professor at York University in Toronto. Thakkar was credited in the Ottawa Citizen for "singlehandedly craft[ing] a whole generation of South Asian dancers in Canada".

=== Performance and choreography ===
In 1984, Thakkar founded the Menaka Thakkar Dance Company, based in Toronto. As a dancer and choreographer, she has toured North America and internationally. One early piece, a solo interpretation of the poem Gita Govinda, earned positive critical reviews in Canadian media when it debuted in the 1970s. She performed the piece for over 25 years.

She has also experimented with novel interpretations of Indian dance traditional styles. For East Meets West, she collaborated with choreographer Robert Desrosiers to blend traditional Indian and Western dance styles.

== Awards and honours ==
Thakkar earned an honorary Doctor of Letters degree from York University in 1993.

In 2012, Thakkar won the Canada Council Walter Carsen Prize for Excellence in the Performing Arts. In 2013, she was awarded the Governor General's Performing Arts Award for Lifetime Artistic Achievement in Dance.

== Death ==
She died on February 5, 2022 in Toronto of complications from Alzheimer's disease. Her death occurred 17 days after that of her older brother Rasesh Thakkar, and the Toronto Globe and Mail published a joint obituary for the two of them.
