= Provincial Dances =

Russian dance theatre

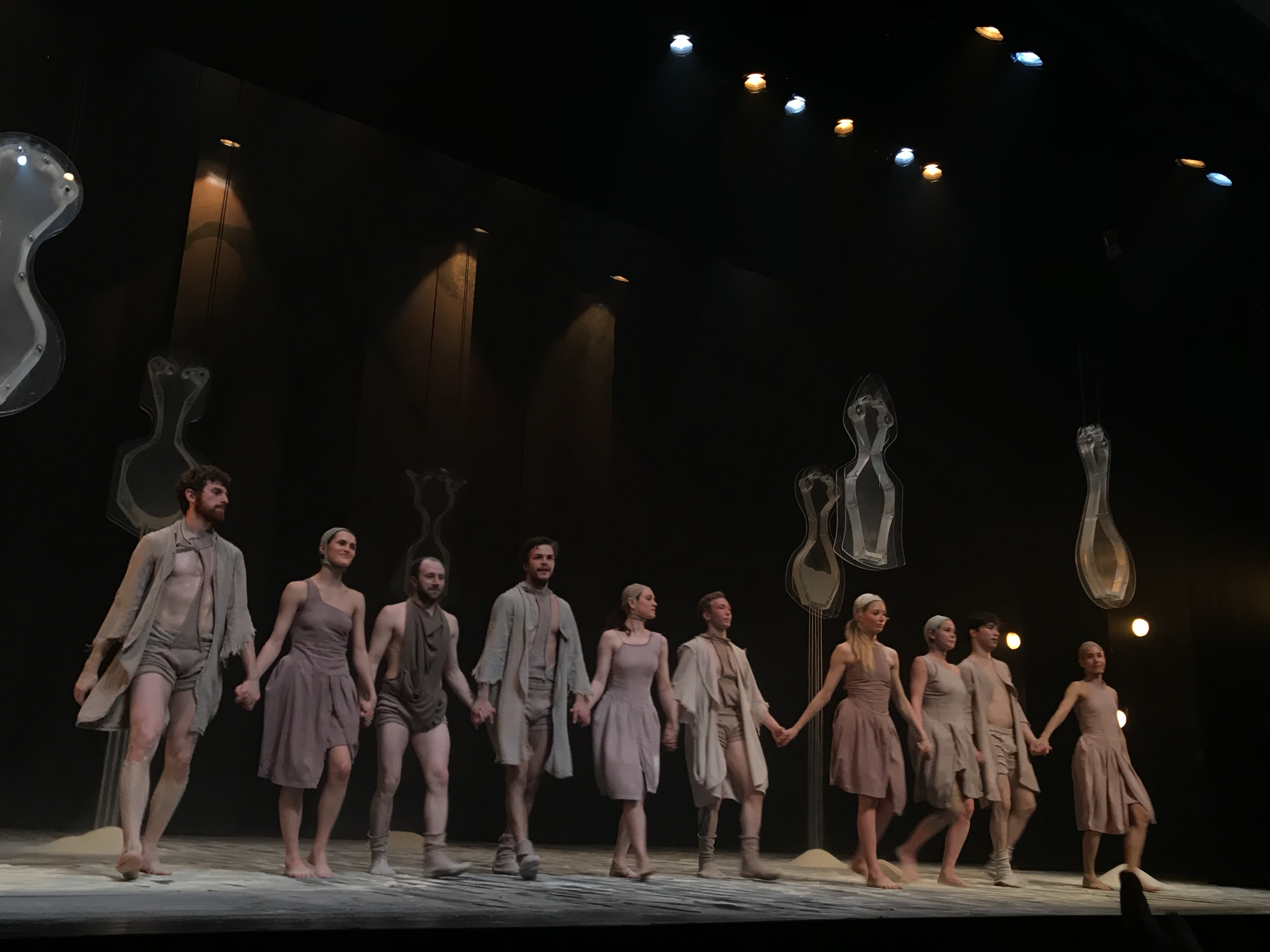

General information
- Year founded: 1990
- Founders: Tatiana Baganava
- Principal venue: various
- Website: Provincial Dances

Senior staff
- Company manager: Olga Pautova

Artistic staff
- Artistic Director: Tatiana Baganava

Other
- Formation: Principal; Soloist; Corps de Ballet

Yekaterinburg Theater of Modern Choreography "Provincial Dances" is a modern dance company founded in Yekaterinburg in 1990. It is one of the first Russian theaters working in the genre of modern dance. The choreographer and artistic director of the troupe is Tatyana Baganova. The foundation of the theater's repertoire is productions of Baganova, performances of foreign choreographers and multi-genre collaborations.

== History ==
The prerequisite for the creation of the collective was the fashion theater, created in 1989 in Sverdlovsk by the director of the youth center at the Uralmash recreation center Lev Shulman. When the dance lessons took the first place instead of the defile, it was decided to change the format. and in 1990, Shulman created the Provincial Dances Theater. In 1992, the theater's artist Tatyana Baganova staged her first major performance, “Versions. Part I ”to the music of Avet Terteryan.

In 1993, Lev Shulman left the “Provincial Dances”, after which Tatyana Baganova became the artistic director of the theater. In addition to independent productions, the choreographer often works together with colleagues from other countries, as well as collaborates with directors of other Yekaterinburg theaters. In total, during the existence of the theater, more than 30 plays and miniatures were staged in it.

In 2010, the theater became municipal. Currently, “Provincial Dances” is a division of the Yekaterinburg Theater of Modern Choreography, which also includes the Center for Contemporary Choreography studio, in which artists teach dance skills to children and adolescents. The rehearsal base of the troupe is located in the building of the Ural Central Committee, however, the collective does not have a permanent venue for performances in Yekaterinburg. In addition to the Central Committee stage, the productions take place on the stage of the Young Spectator Theater, Puppet Theater, Zheleznodorozhnikov Palace of Culture, and Ever Jazz Jazz Club.

The troupe constantly tours, having visited 53 cities of 19 countries and 33 cities of Russia. Five times she took part in the American Dance Festival (Durham, USA). Since 2012, the theater has been organizing the all-Russian annual dance lab project project laboratory.

== Awards ==
Ten theater productions were nominated for the Golden Mask National Theater Award in the nomination "Best Performance" in the competition of ballet performances (1999) and in the competition of modern dance performances (subsequent years). Five pieces by Provincial Dances have won the Golden Mask: Les Noces, Maple Garden, Post-Engagement. Diptych. Part II, This is Not a Love Song, and Imago-Trap.
