= The Rubberbodies Collective =

rubberbodies
- Formation: 2009
- Type: Theatre group
- Location: Malta, Netherlands
- Artistic director(s): Ira Melkonyan, Jimmy Grima
- Notable members: Jimmy Grima, Rebecca Camilleri, Matthew Pandolfino, Ira Melkonyan, Mario Sammut, Martina Buhagiar, Sean Decelis
- Website: www.rubberbodiescollective.com

rubberbodies (formerly stylised as the rubberbodies collective) is an interdisciplinary theatre and performance practice founded in Malta in 2009. The practice emerged from improvisational workshops and the exploration of unconventional, collective approaches to creation, and has since developed into a research-based, process-driven approach encompassing performance, installation, and site-specific projects. Since the mid-2010s, the practice has increasingly developed through international research, festival, and residency contexts. From the early 2020s, its core activity has been based between Malta and the Netherlands, with work presented internationally across Europe and beyond.

== History ==
=== Foundations in Malta (2009–2015) ===
The practice was initiated in 2009 by Jimmy Grima and Rebecca Camilleri, and founded as a collective together with Matthew Pandolfino, Mario Sammut, Ira Melkonyan, and Sean Decelis.

The group’s first public work, Grace u Rofflu, was presented in 2009 at the MITP Theatre in Valletta, following a period of improvisational research and collaborative workshops.

In its early years, the collective produced theatre and performance works combining movement, visual composition, sound, and non-verbal dramaturg. These included 100: Ave Eva Summer Winter (2010), Baħar Abjad (White Sea) (2011), Lore of the Sea – Immemorial Waters (2011), and DUNKARM (2011). Several of these works were developed or presented in collaboration with Maltese cultural institutions and museums.

In 2012, collective member Mario Sammut created Oracle, described as Malta’s first “silent concert”, presented at the Ħaġar Qim. The collective later that year presented Old Salt, an outdoor site-specific theatre work commissioned for the Malta Arts Festival and developed in collaboration with the Malta Maritime Museum.

Throughout the early 2010s, the collective continued to work across movement-based performance, object-driven dramaturgy, and site-specific theatre, experimenting with approaches already present in its initial works. Toward the end of this phase, the collective engaged with script-based performance, including Melkonyan’s The Pill (2014). A concluding moment of this phase was the 2015 Maltese-language production Ma Rridx Immur, written by Leanne Ellul and presented at Teatru Manoel.

By the mid-2010s, these experiments marked the limits of the collective’s initial Malta-based production model and prompted a gradual shift toward longer-term research processes and work developed across multiple contexts.

=== Expansion and research-based practice (2015–2019) ===
Following the completion of its initial Malta-based phase, the collective’s practice increasingly shifted toward extended research processes and collaborative methodologies. While earlier work had already incorporated object-based performance and site-specific dramaturgy, projects developed from around 2015 onwards were characterised by longer development periods, public-facing research formats, and an expanded engagement with social, ecological, and material contexts.

A central project bridging this shift was the Windrose Project (2016–2017), a multi-part public art and research initiative developed within the Valletta 2018 Cultural Programme. Structured around extended interviews and field research with community members in locations including Sliema, Mġarr, Għarb, and Marsaxlokk, the project investigated vernacular knowledge, environmental conditions, and collective memory related to the wind. This research culminated in public events and interventions, including the inauguration of public sculptures and installations in the four localities, as well as a work-in-progress exhibition, Il-Pinnuri (2016), presented at Spazju Kreattiv.

From 2017 onwards, research and production increasingly unfolded across the Netherlands, as the collective’s working contexts expanded beyond Malta. During this period, Ira Melkonyan and, later, Jimmy Grima uundertook postgraduate studies at DAS Arts in Amsterdam. This coincided with a further consolidation of research-led and process-oriented modes of working shaped through academic, festival, and residency contexts.

Within this framework, Melkonyan developed the ongoing research project Upstairs Geology, presented in different formats in the Netherlands and internationally. In 2019, the project received the Acknowledgement Prize at the Zürcher Theater Spektakel. In parallel, Grima further pursued documentary and investigative approaches. Works such as Kerogen Voices engaged with mythology and scientific data related to human-induced earthquakes in the Groningen region, while Nassaba: Song of a Bird was initially developed through field research and interviews with Maltese nassaba (bird-trappers), in collaboration with Teatru Malta.

By the end of the 2010s, these developments had established a research-led practice operating across international academic, festival, and residency frameworks, leading into a Netherlands-based mode of production from 2020 onwards.

=== Netherlands-based practice and international work (2020–present) ===
From 2020 onwards, the collective’s core research and production activity has been based in the Netherlands. During this period, Nassaba: Song of a Bird continued to develop beyond its initial Malta-based iterations. Reworked for international audiences, the project was presented at European festivals and institutions. Research initiated through the Windrose Project was expanded and reformulated as The School of Winds and Waves, a longer-term framework combining performance, field research, and public engagement. Developed from a Netherlands-based research practice, the project extended earlier investigations into wind to water, and local knowledge systems and was realised in the format of a pop up radio and archive through multiple site-specific iterations in different geographical contexts.

In parallel, Jimmy Grima continued to pursue documentary and investigative approaches to performance. In the Netherlands, he initiated the DAS Arts Archive, an artistic research project examining institutional micro-histories and expanded practices within theatre experimentation. In Malta, he developed Kaxxa Infernali: Explosions, a project engaging with themes of silence, sound, and explosion, localised on the island o Filfla, drawing on archival material and interviews with family members.

In 2024, Ira Melkonyan further developed research into liquids, circulation, and material ecologies, leading to the project Blood Thirsty. Initiated through studio-based research processes, the work unfolded through residencies, performances, and public sharings across Europe.
