= Lydia Johnson Dance =

American contemporary dance company

General information
- Name: Lydia Johnson Dance
- Year founded: 1999
- Founders: Lydia Johnson
- Founding choreographers: Lydia Johnson
- Website: www.lydiajohnsondance.org

Other
- Formation: 1999

Lydia Johnson Dance is a contemporary dance company that performs the choreography of Lydia Johnson, primarily in New York City and New Jersey. It is notable for combining ballet and modern dance, sometimes isolating and reworking "components of classical ballet technique." The company was founded in 1999 by Johnson, a choreographer. She has choreographed dance works to various composers including Beethoven, the alternative rock band Cake, Philip Glass, Argentine composer Osvaldo Golijov, Polish composer Henryk Górecki, and others. Since 2008 the company has received annual support from the Geraldine R. Dodge Foundation. Performances tend to have six or seven to twelve dancers, and the company has performed in numerous venues in New Jersey and New York City, and it is based in northern New Jersey. In addition, Lydia Johnson Dance runs a school to teach dance and choreography.

== Reviews ==
Critics have described the company's performances as infusing "ballet with a contemporary sensibility," romantic, handsome, with a calm deliberateness, and invoking a "harmonious world." A New Yorker critic described her performances as "simple, tasteful, and unhurried." A dance critic described a performance as "the most organic choreographic fusion of ballet and modern-dance techniques ever invented." The New York Times critic Brian Seibert wrote:

What seems to count most for Ms. Johnson is music. The four pieces on the program all showed uncommon skill at matching ballet movement to music, both at the large scale of structure and in small felicitous details.

— Brian Seibert, New York Times, June 16, 2015 p. C5.

New York Times critic Jennifer Dunning wrote that Johnson created "a sense of life flowing unhurriedly over mysterious human stories." The New Yorker's Marina Harss wrote that "Johnson is a craftsman and a poet; her works, which stress the ensemble and attend closely to the music, have an ebb and flow in addition to a strong emotional current. The basis of her technique is ballet, and her dancers are strong." New Yorker, June 21–23, 2017.

== Dance instruction ==
Lydia Johnson Dance has a dance school for children of all ages. Classes in ballet, dance, hip hop, and choreography are held at venues such as the Burgdorff Cultural Center in Maplewood. In addition, a dance camp of several weeks duration is offered during the summer for children from first through tenth grades. Company members sometimes serve as mentors to students. At the end of a semester, students present dances they have choreographed.
