= Kaunas Dance Theatre Aura =

Coordinates: 54°53′54″N 23°53′30″E

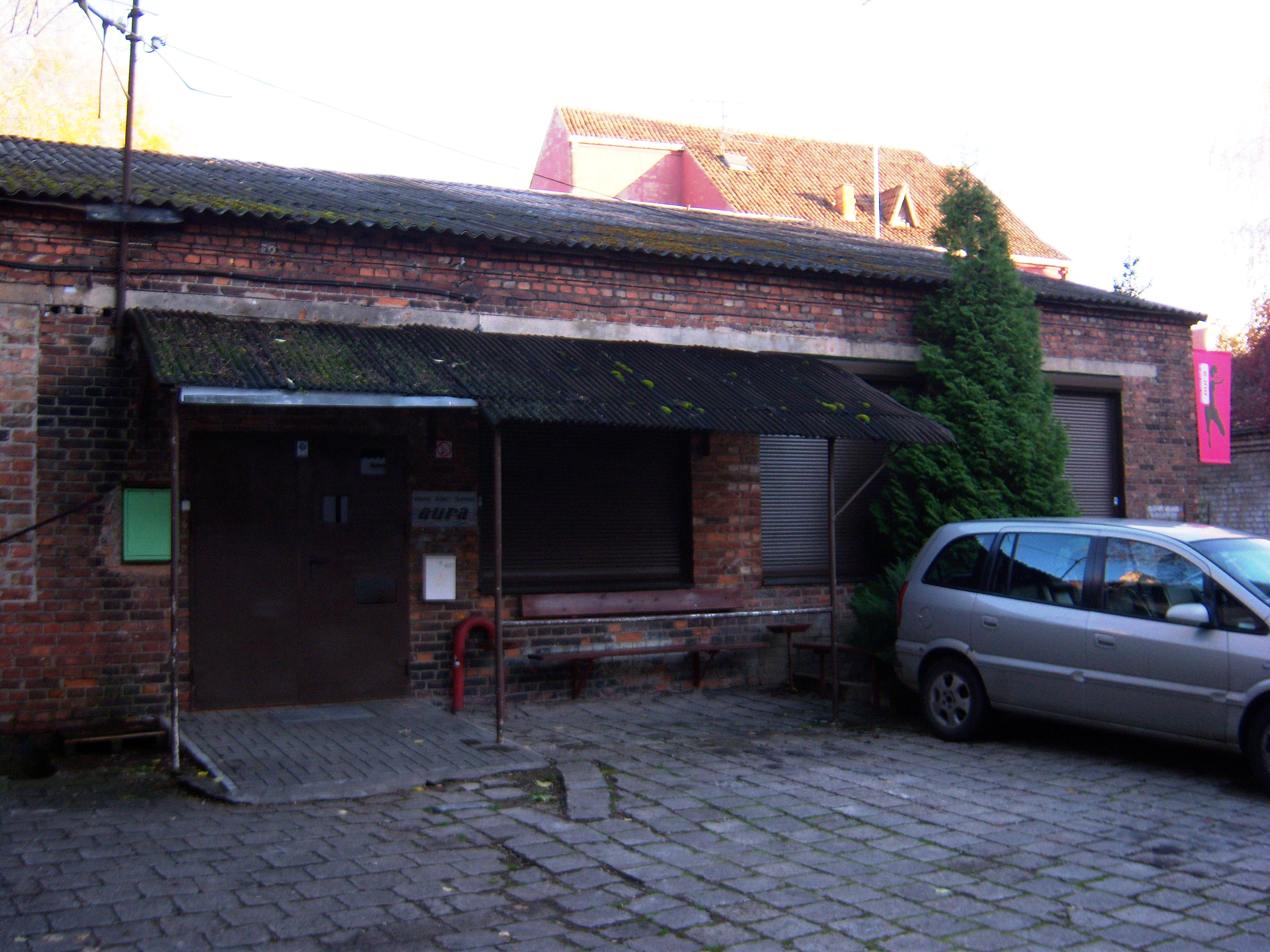
The outside of the theater in Kaunas.

Kaunas Dance Theatre Aura is the professional theatre of contemporary dance based in Kaunas, Lithuania.

== History ==
Dance Theatre Aura first started as an amateur dance group back in 1980. It was founded by the current theatre director Birutė Letukaitė and several other young dancers. In 1982 they gave their first performance. Under the leadership of B. Letukaite who remains Aura's managing and artistic director this small group of dancers has grown into and has become a contemporary dance company in Lithuania with strong international troupe of professional dancers from China, France, Italy, USA, Philippines and more. In 1995 the City of Kaunas awarded Kaunas Dance theatre Aura the status of a municipal theatre.

Since 1989 Kaunas Dance theatre Aura is the organizer of the International Modern Dance Festival, which was recently changed into International Dance Festival AURA. Though the International Modern Dance Festival is first of all an integral part of cultural life and a meaningful tradition in Kaunas, the Festival is being brought to other Lithuanian towns too. The feature of the Festival is the night performances shown at alternative spaces in Kaunas.

Dance theatre Aura has more than 50 awards, have performed in more than 160 festivals in 26 countries by now.
