= Light Motion Dance Company =

Talent Agency

Light Motion Dance Company is a two-woman integrated dance company based in Seattle, combining a wheelchair dancer and an able-bodied dancer in performances.

== Overview ==
Light Motion Dance Company was founded in 1988. The creative forces behind the company are Charlene Curtiss and Joanne Petroff. Performances feature both choreography and improvised dance. Light Motion Dance tours throughout the United States and internationally. Workshops for school children and adults are also part of Light Motion Dance's initiatives. Performances feature the choreography of Curtiss, who developed "front-end" wheelchair manoeuvers through her own experimentation and practise. Performances have been described as "virtuosic".

Charlene Curtiss began using a wheelchair after a gymnastics accident resulted in her becoming paraplegic at age 17 (Curtiss has T12 paraplegia). She became a lawyer, but her interest in wheelchair dance led to her leaving law, and forming the Light Motion Dance Company. In 1990, Curtiss added able-bodied dancer Joanne Petroff to the company. Curtiss has several years' experience as a college-level competitive swimmer, and as a wheelchair athlete in track and field competitions. She also occasionally delivers training in wheelchair aerobics and front-end chair control techniques to inpatients and outpatients at the University of Washington Medical Center.

In addition to performance work, Light Motion Dance Company has helped in the establishment of other integrated dance companies in the United States and around the world.

== See also ==
- Contemporary dance
- Disability in the arts
- Paraplegia
