= NW Fusion Dance Company =

General information
- Name: NW Fusion Dance Company
- Year founded: 2008
- Founders: Brad Hampton

Artistic staff
- Artistic Director: Brad Hampton
- Ballet Mistress: Dana Bliss

NW Fusion Dance Company is a pre-professional dance company based in Tigard, Oregon, United States. The company was founded in 2008 by former Broadway performer Brad Hampton, who has served as Artistic Director since the company's inception. The company has sixteen full-time members, comprising a group of advanced teen dancers who have undergone a rigorous audition process. Dancers audition in the summer and those accepted into the Company commit to perform with NW Fusion for one year.

The Company's unusually broad repertoire covers a diverse range of dance styles including classical ballet, contemporary, jazz, tap, musical theater and hip hop. Some performance works are the creations of internationally renowned guest choreographers such as Kurt Douglas (José Limón Dance Company), Jen Freeman, and Chase Brock (Chase Brock Experience), while others are designed by local guest artists and NW Fusion's resident artistic staff. NW Fusion presents theater performances throughout the year at public concerts, benefits, community events, fundraisers, and private and corporate events.

NW Fusion is funded in part by Friends of NW Fusion, a non-profit 501(c)(3) corporation.

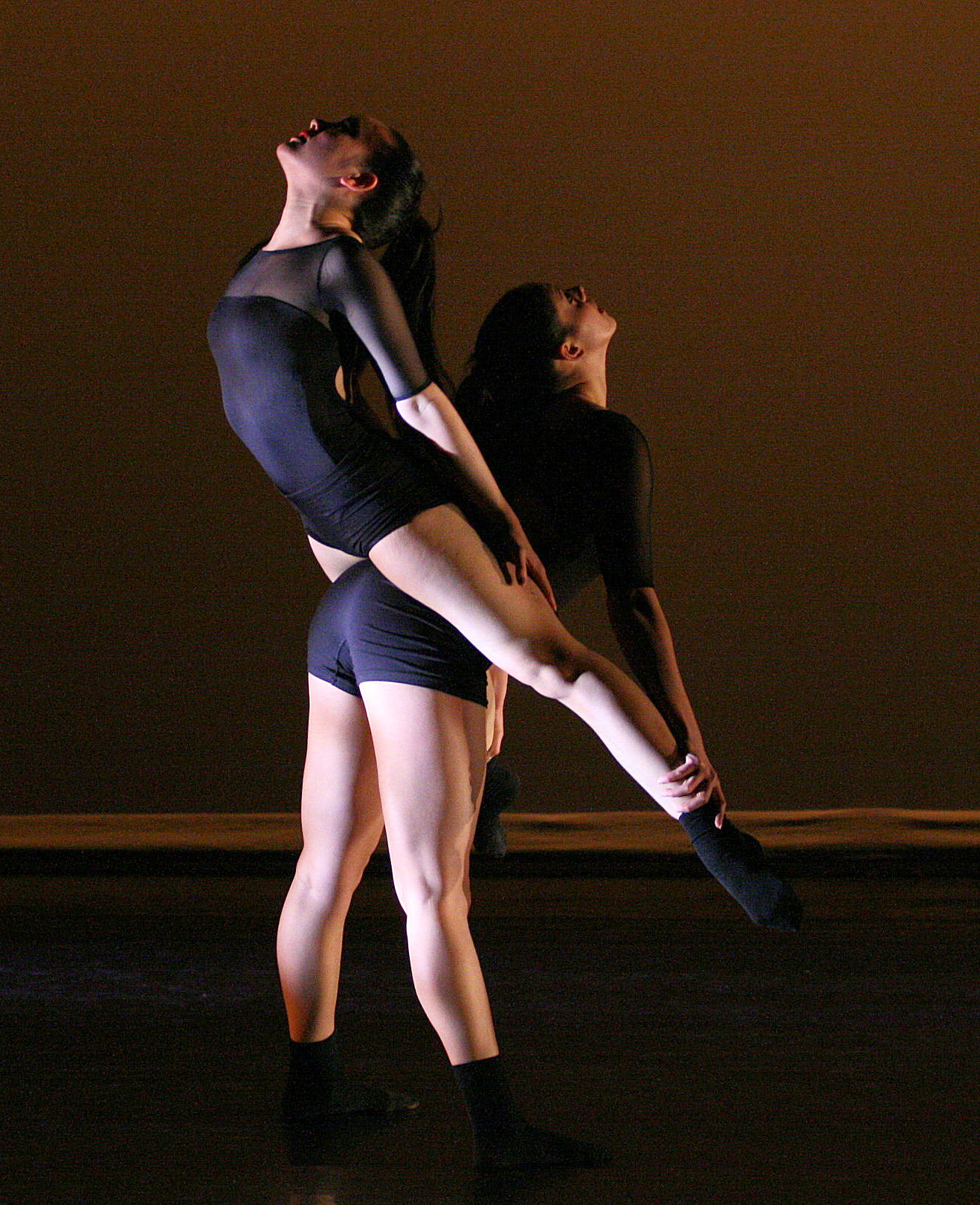

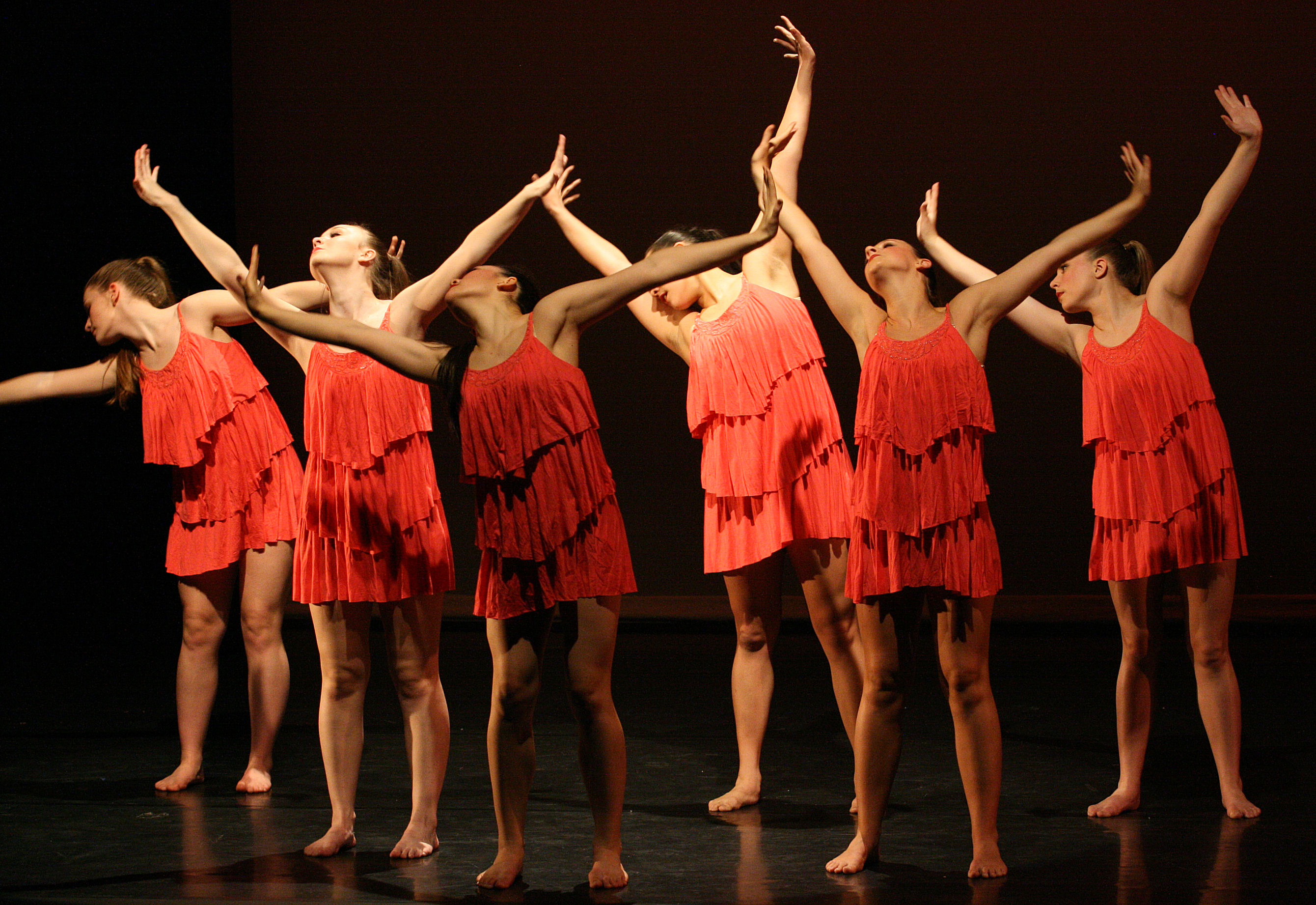

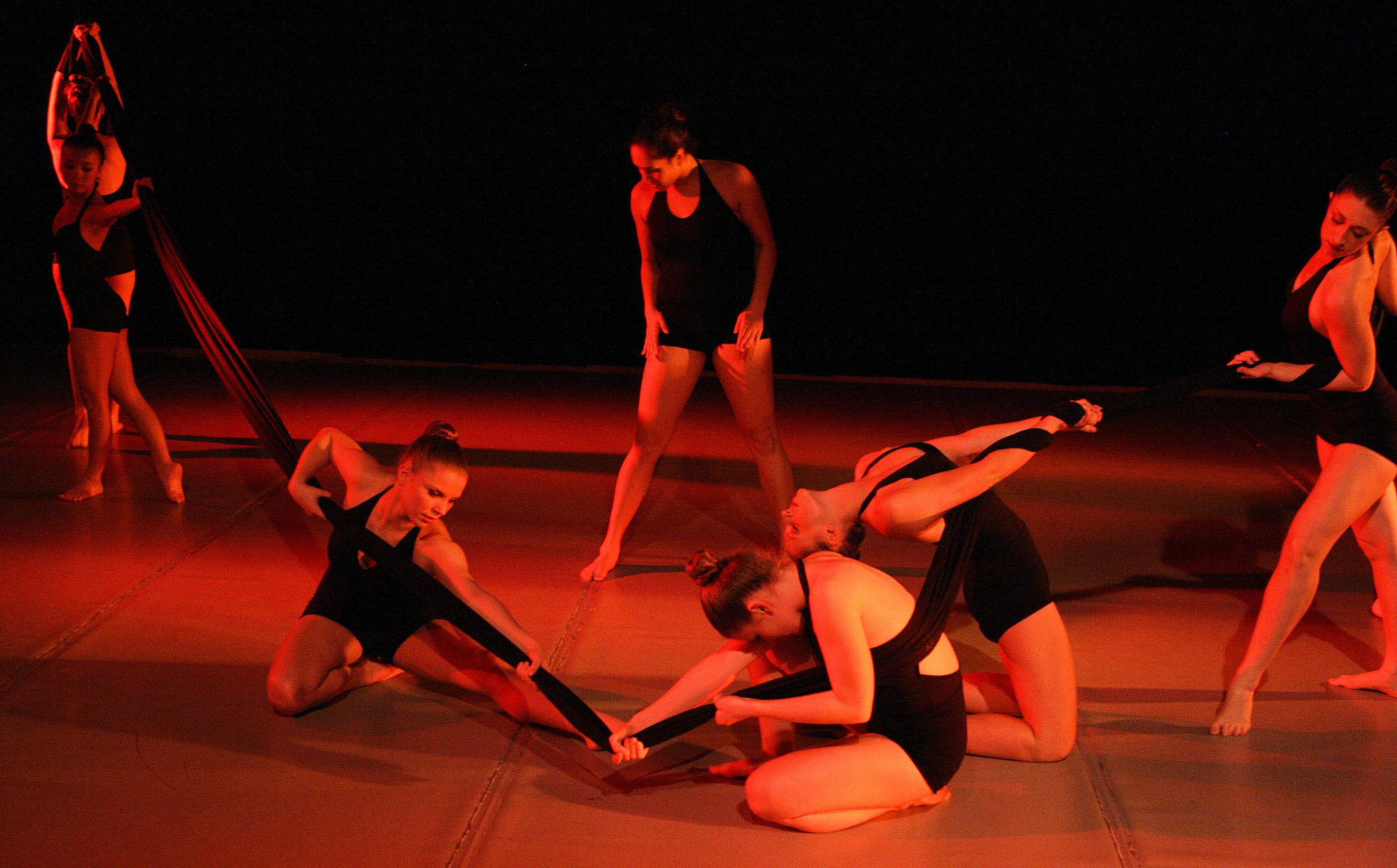

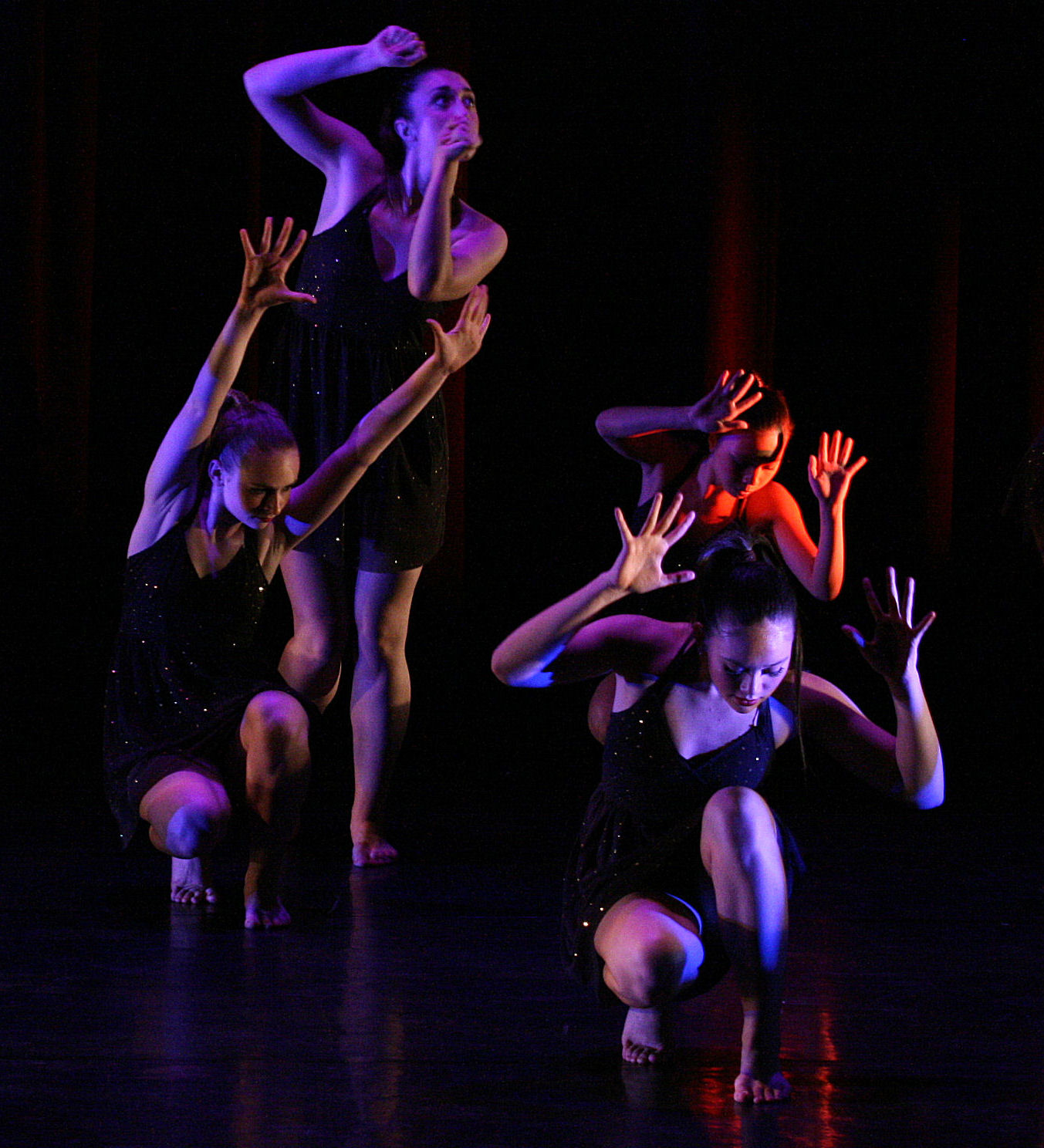
