= La Cebra Danza Gay =

Mexican dance troupe

La Cebra Danza Gay is a dance troupe founded in 1996 by José Rivera Moya in Mexico City. It is the first in Mexico to focus nearly exclusively on gay community and the issues it faces. The groups as a repertoire of over ten major works including Danza del mal amor o mejor me voy, which has been performed over 100 times. La Cebra has appeared in various locations in Mexico and has had appearances in the United States and France.

== José Rivera Moya ==
The dance troupe was founded by José Rivera Moya from San Luis Potosí. When Rivera arrived to Mexico City in 1987, there were no gay bars and police action against homosexuals was common. In the capital, Rivera became a dancer with the Ballet Independiente under director Raúl Flores Canelo, who would remain an influence on Rivera's work since. While a dancer with this Ballet, Rivera produced his first work with a homoerotic theme called Danza del mal amor o mejor me voy, first presented in 1990, winning the Concurso Interno de Coreografías of that year. In 1996, Rivera founded La Cebra in Mexico City to focus nearly exclusively on gay themes, becoming his life's work.

Rivera readily admits he is not the first choreographer in Mexico to create gay-themed pieces, giving credit to his mentor Flores Canelo as well as to Marco Antonio Silva and Miguel Mancillas. However, he founded La Cebra as the first to focus on gay themes, with much of the works presented by the group based on Rivera's own life as a gay male growing up in Mexican society. The director considers himself a “narrative choreographer” and says that his works say what many young gays “want to scream.” Today, Rivera remains artistic director of the Ballet Independiente and has become a member of the Mexican Society of Choreographers (Sociedad Mexicana de Coreógrafos).

== History and make up of La Cebra ==
La Cebra Danza Gay was established in 1996 specifically to focus on gay issues, including erotic themes. Rivera's 1990s work, Danza del mal amor o mejor me voy, moved from the Ballet Independiente to become one of the main elements of the new organization's repertoire. In 1998, the group had it first major performance at the XXIII Festival Internacional de Danza “Lilia López” in San Luis Potosí. Since then it has remained active, performing in various parts of Mexico and the United States. As of 2005, Danza del mal amor o mejor me voy had been performed 100 times. In 2010, it collaborated with humorist Alejandro García Villalón of the Nueva Trova Cubana. Today, there are six main dancers José Rivera Moya, Bruno Ramri, Hugo Cruz, Jonathan Villeda, Juan Madero and Jesús Salinas. It is one of very few dance troupes consisting entirely of men, as most are dominated by women. The members of the group are not necessarily homosexual, but the themes it works with almost exclusively are. La Cebra has had guest choreographers such as Rafael Rosales, also from the Ballet Independiente, and Bruno Ramri. The group receives support from the Instituto Nacional de Bellas Artes, with permanent practice space at the CONACULTA building in Colonia Guerrero in Mexico City. For its 15th anniversary, the troupe performed “Con humo en los ojos y en el corazón” by Uruguayan dancer Dery Fazio. The event also included a “retro” fashion show to support AIDS research.

== Repertoire and message ==
La Cebra's message and focus remains on the gay community and the issues it faces with some branching out to more general cultural and human rights issues. These include elements such as homoeroticism, violence, minority rights, AIDS, cross-dressing, hate crimes, discrimination, male prostitution and the Catholic's church stance on homosexuality.

Ave María Purísima, de prostitución y lentejuelas was created with the dance company in 1996. Yo no soy Pancho Villa ni me gusta el futbol was created in 1998 about the gay nightclub scene in Mexico City. Quinceañera del Bajío mata a sus chambelanes is a criticism of the drug-related violence which plagues Mexico. Oraciones was choreographed by Graciela Henriquez, which traces the roots of Latin American peoples and the religious syncretism that emerged after Spanish and Portuguese conquests. Arcoiris Mambo is a homage to the music of the 1950s, and the movies of Mexico's Golden Age of Cinema. Bailemos a Mozart. Por los ángeles que se han ido was created in 2001 in memory of those who had died of AIDS. El tiempo lo arrasa todo. Queda la muerte was created in 2004 which discusses death and AIDS. Cartas de amor is about people who live with HIV. El soldado y el marinero is a love story.

== Appearances ==
La Cebra has performed in various parts of Mexico, such as Baja California, Colima and Oaxaca and has made appearances in the United States and Europe. The group performed Bailemos a Mozart, por los angeles at the Palacio de Bellas Artes, the country's most prestigious venue. The group represented Mexico at the X Biennal de la Danse in Lyon, France, in 2002. It participated in the X Muestra Internacional de Danza Tijuana in 2008. In 2010, performed at the Feria del Libro y la Rosa in Taxco, sponsored by UNAM, and the Festival Artístico Coahuila. In 2011, they were invited to perform at the Festival Internacional Cervantino, which is significant as Guanajuato is considered one of the most conservative cities in Mexico. For this event, the group opted to perform a work called Ganímedes,” which is based on the Greek myth. It has homoerotic themes and dances who are nude except for body paint.
