= ECNAD =

ECNAD (the reverse spelling of 'dance') is a contemporary dance company founded in 1996 in Singapore with a multi-disciplinary approach.

== History ==
It was formerly known as Dance Dimension Project. ECNAD (https://web.archive.org/web/20190413062251/http://www.ecnad.org/) is one of the first non government professional creative dance company that mushroomed amidst the then cultural desert of Singapore. This in turn sparks off the formation of many new contemporary dance companies in Singapore, a phenomenon never seem before in the modern cultural history of Singapore. Its founders and artistic directors Tan How Choon and Lim Chin Huat (Lim was 2000 Young Artist Award recipient) who are 2 ordinary individuals of indigenous approach to expression despite their western influences in fine arts, dance and sport training backgrounds.

From 1997 to 2000, it initiated a series of outreach site-specific works at fountains and architectural spaces in the urban environment. Suntec City fountain, Bugis Junction fountain, Millennia Walk and UOB Plaza Atrium are some of the performance venues. These are projects that aims at facilitating environment and dance aesthetics of the general public through performances that highlight and work with the existing aesthetics of the chosen space. In fact, this is at that time, one of the first of its kind project by private individuals never seem before by the republic.

ECNAD has performed more than 50 creations over the past 12 years as in year 2008.

In the 1990s to early 2000s, ECNAD focused mainly on:

- providing opportunities and assisting local dance artists to work together and create their dances
- free outreach performances for the general public
- gaining valuable experiences through collaborations with overseas professionals
- nurturing and assisting new talents to fulfil their dreams
- explore working with many production artists besides dancers

The company received both full-house and standing ovation for her tour performances "Floating Mirror" and "a-the-bird" in 35th Belgrade International Theatre Festival (BITEF), and had an audience of 19,700 for "Tales from The Giant Blanket" performances in Festival of Asia in New Zealand in 2001.

- "…, [Ecnad] signalled a new direction for the festival. Their success with New Zealand audiences meant that more contemporary material is likely to be introduced in future years." ~ Festival of Asia 2001 Report, New Zealand

In 2002, it was commissioned by the National Arts Council of Singapore to perform a multi-disciplinary artistic work entitled "Missing In Tall Pillars" at the Asian Civilisations Museum.

In 2006, ECNAD was commissioned to co-conceptualised and created "Metamorphosis" to open the evening for Mercedes-Benz Asia Fashion Award (regional final competition).

Its artistic ideal and vision continues to evolve and in March 2008, Artistic Co-Director Tan How Choon staged a multi-disciplinary production entitled In The Name Of Dance that successfully assimilated dance, movement, acting and singing into one cohesive creation. He has also achieved a unique creative breakthrough by staging Songs For Gaia (2009), showcasing singing dancers assimilating a cappella singing, contemporary dance and his own music into a total and original theatrical experience.

Log on to https://www.youtube.com/watch?v=xdf8m01M0tI for samples of ECNAD songs!

Artistic Co-Director Lim Chin Huat has also achieved outreach breakthrough for the local dance scene through a collaboration with The Arts House and led a unique dance festival titled CampFire 2009 comprising free dance performances, dance photo competition/exhibition, a dance workshop and a dance marathon. CampFire 2009 is an event in conjunction with the Singapore River Festival 2009.

Both ECNAD Artistic Co-Directors will be working together to create a new production titled BUN & STONE (https://www.youtube.com/watch?v=8crDM8ac6Bo) in March 2010 at The Arts House.

Currently, the company has also designed and programmed its own dance training programs under ECNAD Education filling the gap for keen individuals to receive all-rounded practical dance education on a part-time basis. ECNAD students' recent creative works were showcased in Part-Time Daydreaming (2008). In the past, students has been encouraged and supported through other creative showcases such as Bottled Dances and Out-Of-Site. The tradition of giving generous support and mentorship to keen individuals to creative dance has been practised since the beginning of the company!

The word "ecnad" is now becoming popular worldwide in representing performing arts activities and companies. It has also been attached with the meaning of "someone who lives for dancing". The word "ecnad" has indeed come a long way since it was invented in 1996 by the Singaporean artists!

ECNAD is a creative sparkle uniquely from Singapore, with a humble beginning and strong aesthetic vision deserving of all supports and recognition!

== See also ==
- Dance in Singapore
- Culture of Singapore
