= Tumàka't Contemporary Dance =

Mexican dance troupe

tumàka't Contemporary Dance

General information
- Name: tumàka't Contemporary Dance
- Year founded: 2007
- Founding artistic director: Vania Duran
- Website: http://www.tumakat.com/

tumàka't Contemporary Dance is a Mexican contemporary dance troupe founded in 2007, under Vania Duran, which works to promote contemporary dance in southern Mexico.

== The company ==
tumàka't (not capitalized) is based in Mérida, Yucatán. In addition to performances, they create produce and present original works, promote contemporary dance in the region through educational programs and artist residencies. Classes are mostly for professional dancers and others in theater. The company has given classes in collaboration with FONCA and has had instructors from Mexico, Argentina, the United States, Venezuela and England, including Cecilia Colaerai, John Jasperse, Kristie Simpson, Jeremy Nelson, Luis Lara and Alicia Sánchez. However, it has also given classes to non-professionals, such as a children’s dance program in Mexico City.

Vania Duran continues as the tumàka't’s director. Born in Benque Viejo del Carmen, Belize in 1976, she received her BFA in modern dance from the University of Utah and a masters in arts administration from the University of Barcelona. She also trained at the Alejo Carpentier Ballet School in Havana, Cuba. Along with her work with tumàka't, she has performed with Al Sur Danza, the Festival Internacional Cervantino, the Rastro Dance Company in New York and the Reposatory Dance Company and Performing Dance Company in Salt Lake City.

Along with Duran, present members and collaborators of the company include Manuel Fajardo, Verónica Santiago, Melisabel Correa, Christian Ramírez, Patricia Marín, Fernando Melo, Angelle Hebert, Phillip Kraft, Diana Szeinblum (guest choreographer), Luis Biasotto (guest choreographer), Mauricio Ascencio (stage designer, lighting and costume), Vladimir Rodríguez (guest choreographer), Julieta Valero (choreographer & dancer), Sebastian Verea (composer), Eun Jung Choi (guest choreographer) and Fanny Ortiz (dancer) .

The company has worked with external artists, such as Argentinian director Luis Biasotto.

== Performances ==
tumàka't has appeared regularly throughout the Yucatan Peninsula as part of the Itinerarte pargram sponsored by the city of Mérida. as well as festivals in Mexico, Colombia, Panama, Belize, Venezuela and Spain. These festivals include Festival de Danza Contemporánea Oc-‘Ohtic, the Festival Otoño Cultural and the Festivas de las Artes in Merida, Muestra Internacional de Danza de Oaxaca, at the Teatro de la Danza, Festival Puro Teatro in 2010, Festival Internacional Cervantino in 2011, the Festival Revueltas in Durango, Festival Internacional de Danza (at the Reina Sofia Museum in Madrid in 2012), and the Impulso Festival in Colombia in 2013. It also toured six southern Mexican states as part of the Circuito de Artes Escénicas de la Zona Sur.

== List of productions ==
Productions can include performance art, and interactions with objects along with dance.

Productions by the company include:

- Brins, (first project)
- Buenas intenciones en 01:19:00 (1 minuto 19 segundos)
- El lagarto de humo
- Make / Believe
- Panorámica (sponsored by a grant from the Iberescena Program in 2011) .
- Yo antes es hora
- Rua do Lavradio o La distancia más larga entre dos puntos
- Sutura
- Tubos
- Yo, antes es ahora
