= DC Cowboys =

All-male, gay, non-profit dance company

External videos
- DC Cowboys on YouTube

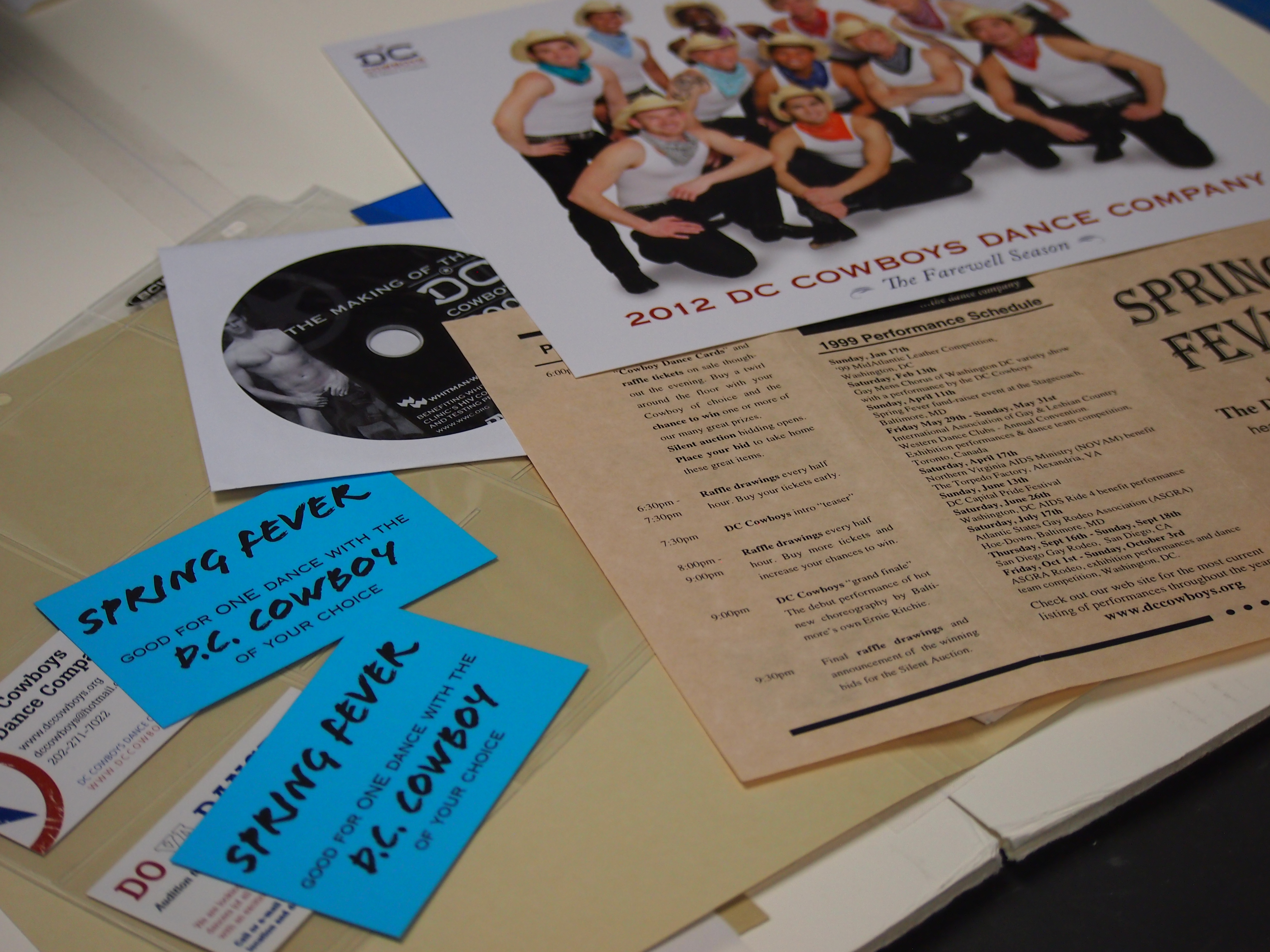
Ephemera from DC Cowboys Dance Company, a performing arts organization for gay men founded in 1994. Collections of the Smithsonian’s National Museum of American History, Archives Center. LGBT Collection (NMAH.AC.1146, box 34).

DC Cowboys Dance Company (1994-2012), was an all-male, gay, non-profit dance company based in Washington, DC. Their mission was to provide free dance entertainment to raise money to provide services to people living with HIV/AIDS, as well as for AIDS prevention programs.

== History ==
The DC Cowboys Dance Company, an all-male, gay dance company, performed around the world from 1994 to 2012. They provided jazz-style, dance entertainment spanning several musical genres (contemporary, country, club dance party, pop, to classic Broadway.) Kevin Platte, founder and Artistic Director, started the dance company in August 1994 after seeing a similar troupe in California. In 1996, Platte added a charitable element with a mission to provide free entertainment to any HIV/AIDS charitable organization. Over the years, the company raised funds for HIV/AIDS organizations by sharing the profits of their calendar sales.

Performance highlights included America's Got Talent television show, season 3, NBC, semifinalists (2008); the closing ceremonies of the Gay Games VII at Wrigley Field in Chicago (2006); The Sziget Festival in Budapest, Hungary (2009–2012); Dales' Great Getaway television show, ITV London, England (2012); The Podge and Rodge television show, RTE, Dublin, Ireland (2010). They were an Arts grant recipient from the DC Commission on the Arts and Humanities and the National Endowment for the Arts (1996).

At the time of their closing, they had had 82 dancers, or "cowboys", and raised thousands of dollars with 455 performances. Their last performance was at the DC Pride Parade in 2012. The National Museum of American History's Archives Center acquired their records in 2013.
