= Zero Visibility Corp =

Norwegian contemporary dance company

zero visibility corp. is a contemporary dance company based in Oslo, Norway which was founded in 1996 by its choreographer Ina Christel Johannessen and lighting and set designer, Jens Sethzman. Their productions are developed from improvisation with a stylistic approach that has overtones of martial arts and acrobatics, between art-dance and pop-dance, "pure dance" and theatrical dance, humorous and serious dance.

With its particular choreographic style, their work is based on films, literature and news stories which combine to generate an intentional ambivalence about diverse themes, creating material in close dialogue with everyone involved. Zero Visibility works with artist within experimental electronic music. The company has toured its work internationally, in Europe, Australia, the United States, and Canada and has become one of Norway's most internationally recognised dance companies. Their work has been featured in several notable arts and contemporary dance festivals, including the Edinburgh Festival Fringe, Scotland; NOTT Dance, UK; Fierce!, UK; and euro-scene, Germany.

== Productions ==
- 1997 ...except that I would like to be rid of it...
- 1998 what do we do now that we're happy
- 1999 hunt out [reprise]
- 2000 Suppose this time I see what he saw
- 2001 confession time: that cool and immature feeling of total honesty
- 2002 mic mac
- 2003 ...it's only a rehearsal - An adaptation of Ovid's Metamorphoses.
- 2004 The Terror Of Identification
- 2006 (but) that night I found her very alluring
- 2006 I have a secret to tell you (please) leave with me
- 2008 37,7
- 2008 It was November
- 2009 THIEF – AFTER – Clip 0 (zero)
- 2010 NOW SHE KNOWS
- 2011 (im)possible
- 2012 Again
- 2012 Leave.Two.House
- 2014 Terra 0 Motel
- 2015 Piano Piano
- 2015 The Guest
- 2016 Future
- 2017 Frozen Songs
- 2018 Who told you this room exists?
- 2019 Il Lunedi
- 2020 When Monday Came
