= Eryc Taylor Dance =

Eryc Taylor Dance (ETD) is a nonprofit, 501(c)(3) organization, dance company based in New York City. The company was founded in 2006, by Eryc Taylor.

== Prior to founding ==
Taylor had started the process to getting a master's degree in Fine Arts at New York University. Instead of completing that, he started several "pickup companies" with choreographers he'd previously worked with. (Pickup companies in dance are companies put together for temporary purposes or one performance only--somewhat like pickup games in sports. The concept also exists for musical groups.) He then started ETD.

== Mission ==
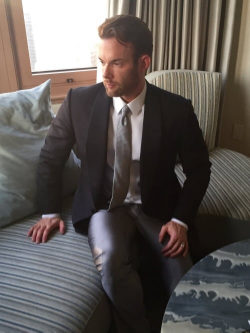
Eryc Taylor

Since its founding, ETD has produced annual performances showcasing works by Taylor as well young new choreographers, provided summer classes to aspiring dancers, and conducted dance and movement therapy programs for challenged adults and youth.

== Collaborations ==
Eryc Taylor Dance collaborates with various artists every year including dancers, photographers, painters, lighting designers, costumes designers, and composers.

=== 2017 ===
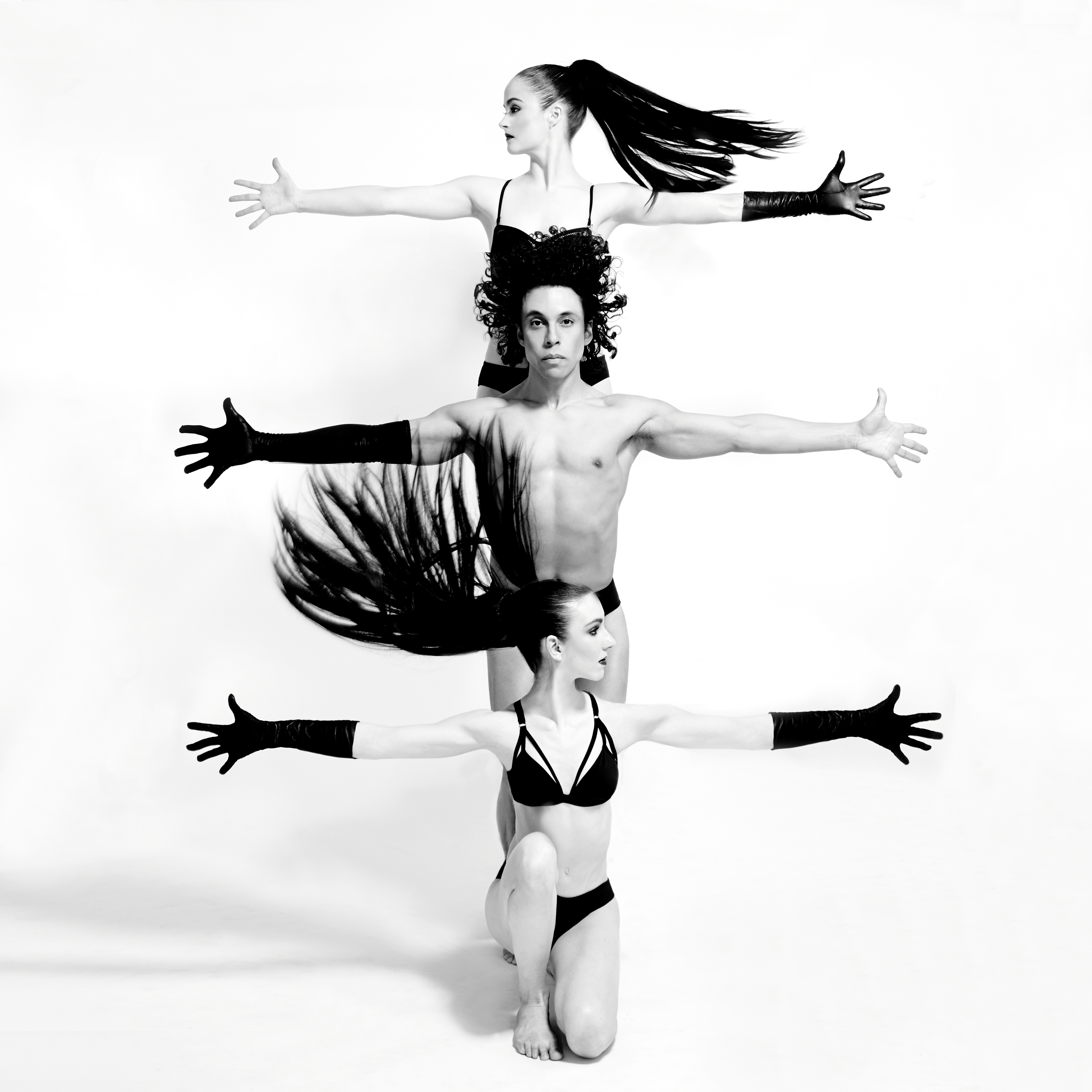
ETD & Steven Menendez Collaboration. 2017.

1. Gerald Busby (Composer)
2. Daniel Tobias (Composer)
3. Swarm Intelligence (Composer)
4. Salomon Lerner (Composer)
5. Stephen Michael Smith (Conductor)
6. Steven Menendez (Photographer)
7. Kristina Zaidner (Photographer)
8. Maria Panina (Photographer)
9. Ether (Costume)
10. Dav Burrington (Costume)
11. Scooter LaForge (Costume)
12. Chris Annas-Lee (Lighting)
13. Jason Fok (Lighting)

== Performances ==
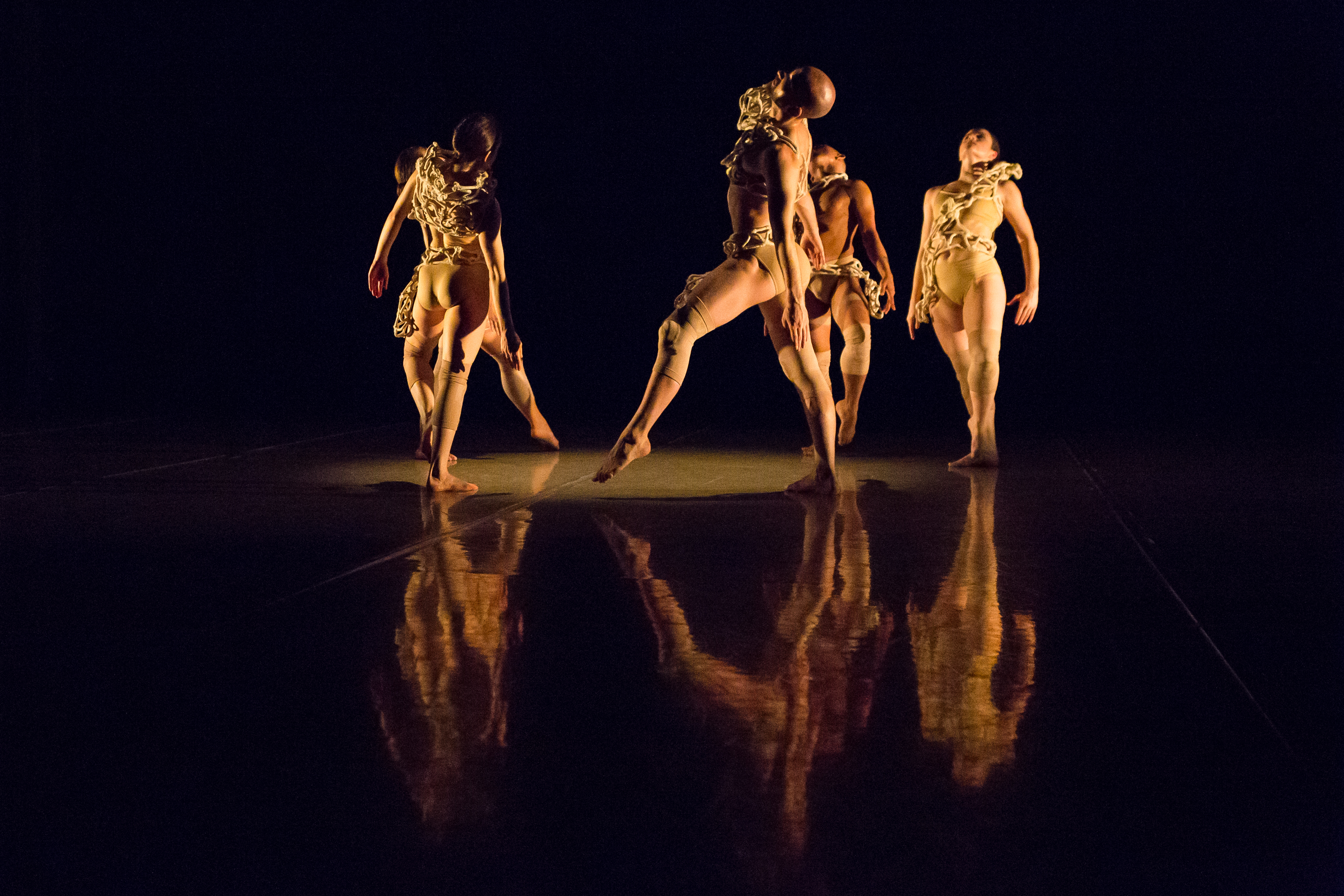
CYCLES (2017). 2017 NYC Season. Martha Graham Studio Theater. Photo: Hunter Canning

- 2017 NYC Season (Martha Graham Studio Theater) New York, NY. October 13–15, 2017.
- Dancers For Good (The Ross School) East Hampton, NY. June 3, 2017.
- 10th Anniversary NYC Season (Martha Graham Studio Theater) New York, NY. October 18–21, 2016.
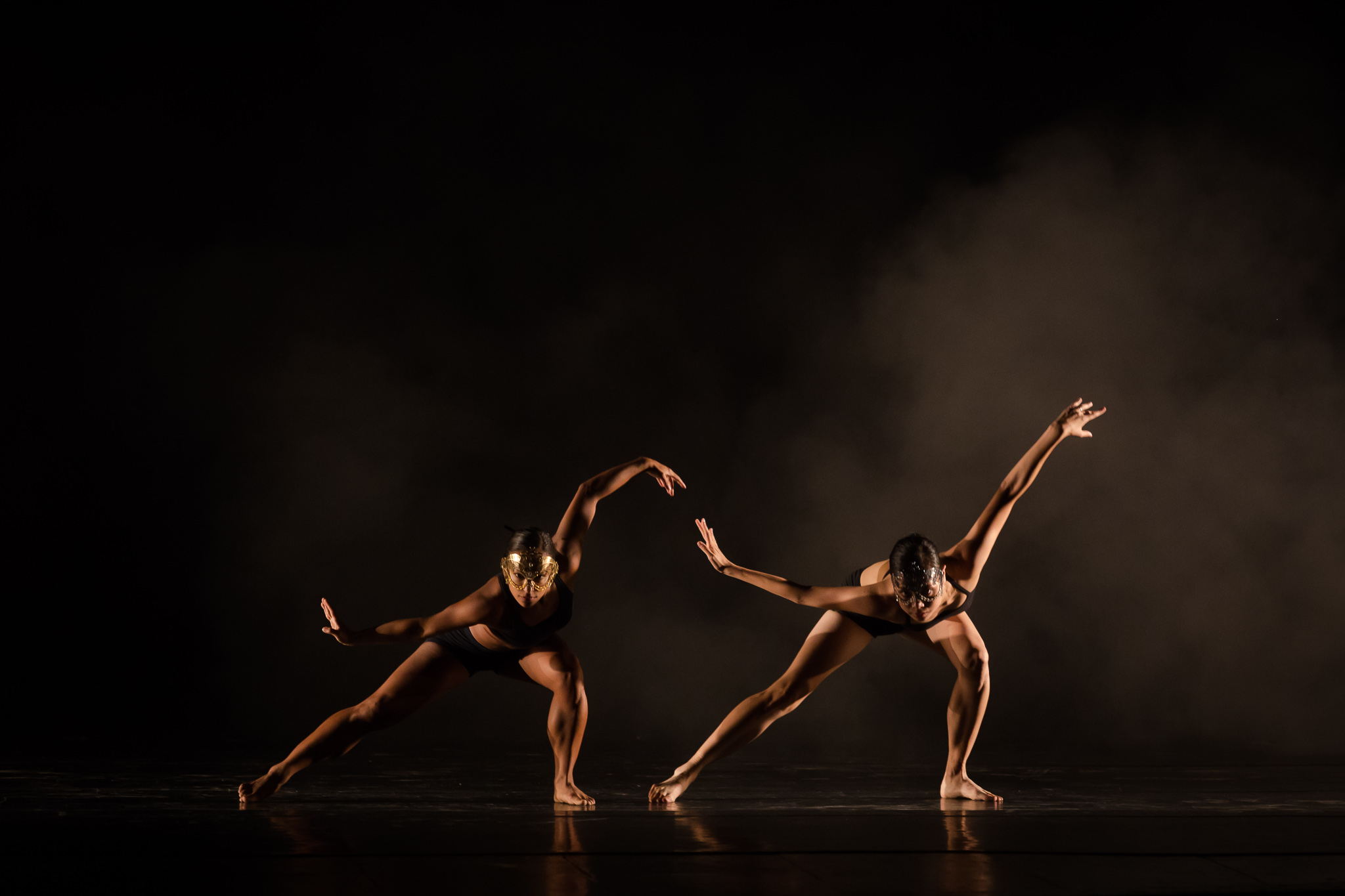
  International Dance Festival Avant Garde, 2015. Camille Workman & Shoko Fujita.
- The International Dance Festival Avant Garde XVIII (El Teatro Peón Contreras) Mérida, Mexico. September 23–27, 2016.
- The Exhibit (The Alchemical Theatre) New York, NY. October 15–18, 2015.
- The International Dance Festival Avant Garde (Armando Manzanero Teatro) Mérida, Mexico. September 24–27, 2015.
- Emergence (Rose Nagelberg Theater) New York, NY. April 22, 2014.

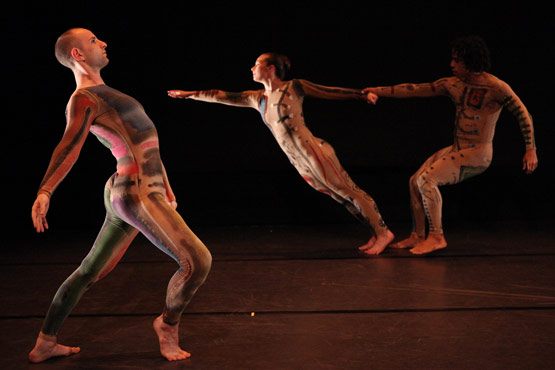
Song for Cello and Piano (2016). Dancers For Good, East Hamptons.

- SILO Residency Kirkland, PA. 2011
- Pushing Boundaries (Joyce SoHo) New York, NY. November 10, 2010
- Eminent Domain (Ailey Citigroup Theater) New York, NY. October 6, 2009.

== Outreach & Programs ==
ETD does mobile outreach through its ETD Outreach program, meeting those in need of outreach services at the locations where those in need are.

=== Dance & Movement Workshops ===
In 2013, Eryc Taylor Dance began a residency program at the Postgraduate Center for Mental Health, offering one "Movement Expressions" workshop each week. Due to positive results, PCMH turned the residency into a permanently scheduled program, seven workshops a week at seven different residences. Since then, ETD Outreach has expanded into numerous supportive housing & wellness organizations throughout the five boroughs including:

1. NYU Langone
2. Lantern Community Services
3. Acacia Network
4. Center for Urban Community Services
5. Odyssey House
6. Services for the Underserved
7. Hour Children

=== New Choreographer Grant ===
Every year, Eryc Taylor Dance gives out three grants to young, aspiring NYC-based choreographers. Eryc works with each of them and guides them through the process of creating a new piece.

A works-in-progress showing is hosted by ETD for the grant recipients after three months.

Past Recipients:

2017: Nick Rodrigues | Robert Mark Burke | Rachel M. Hettinger

2016: Timothy Patterson | Winnie Berger | Aaron McGloin

2015: Ana Sosa | Eryn Renee Young | Daniel Holt

2014: Ashley Carter | Gierre Godley | Jesus Olivera
