= Laleget Danza =

Mexican international dance company

Laleget Danza is an international dance company based in Mexico City which was founded by Diego Vázquez in 2005. Besides Mexico, it has also performed in Spain, United Kingdom, Netherlands, Slovakia, Curaçao and Palestine. It has appeared in various theaters and festivals in Mexico including the Festival Internacional Cervantino in 2008 and 2011.

== Company ==
It is a small ensemble of young dancers and choreographers from different countries, such as Japan, Portugal, Netherlands, France, Cuba, United States and Mexico. It is based in Mexico City dedicated to contemporary dance with the intention to create work that is relevant to our times. Their work challenges concepts such as identity, justice, pleasure, and the sense of community and belonging. . The company was founded in 2005 by its current artistic director and choreographer Diego Vázquez, and the name Laleget is the Hebrew word for “to go", stating that their creations strive to be a “dance that goes to the heart of the viewer.

Laleget Danza performs regularly in theatres such as Palacio de Bellas Artes, Teatro de las Artes, Teatro de la Ciudad Esperanza Iris, Teatro de la Danza INBA, amongst others. Laleget has been invited to participate in Festival del Desierto, in 2007, in San Luis Potosí; Mexico City's Performing Art Festival, in 2007; and in the Festival Internacional Cervantino, in Guanajuato, in 2008 and 2011. The company toured in 2014 to Spain with the grant "Rutas Escénicas” of FONCA.

== Repertoire ==
Their repertoire has include works such as Esch, Foreign Land, Invitación, Esther, Enraptured Time, Et le vent, Clean Slate, Tiempo de mariachi, Backwards II, Image.jpg, Attachment, False Cognate, and Pendiente. The later is a coproduction Curaçao-Mexico, a collaboration between choreographer and dancer Faizah Grootens, sound artist Raúl Maduro, and Vázquez.

Enraptured Time was created by the company for the 2008 Festival Internacional Cervantino composed of three works: instrumental, voice and video. It is based on eight songs by writer and scientist Adelbert von Chamisso which deal with the life cycle of a long-term couple.

Tierra ajena was created to evoke feelings of melancholy, loneliness and uncertainty related to unfulfilled dreams, especially those related to immigration.

Petrushka is based on the work by Alexandre Benois and Igor Stravinsky. The music remains mostly from Stravinsky . The story is about a puppet with a human heart, but whose life is tragic. In the children's version, the story is less tragic with comic elements, with the puppet returning to life at the end. At the end of the show, children in the audience are invited on stage to dance with the company. The work was originally presented at the Sala Miguel Covarrubias at UNAM, where it ran for three months. It was then presented at the Festival Internacional Cervantino in 2011 with support from the Coordinación Nacional de Desarrollo Cultural Infantil Alas y Raíces del CONACULTA, the Government of the State of Morelos and Coordinación de Difusión Cultural UNAM.
