= Louise Bédard =

Canadian dancer

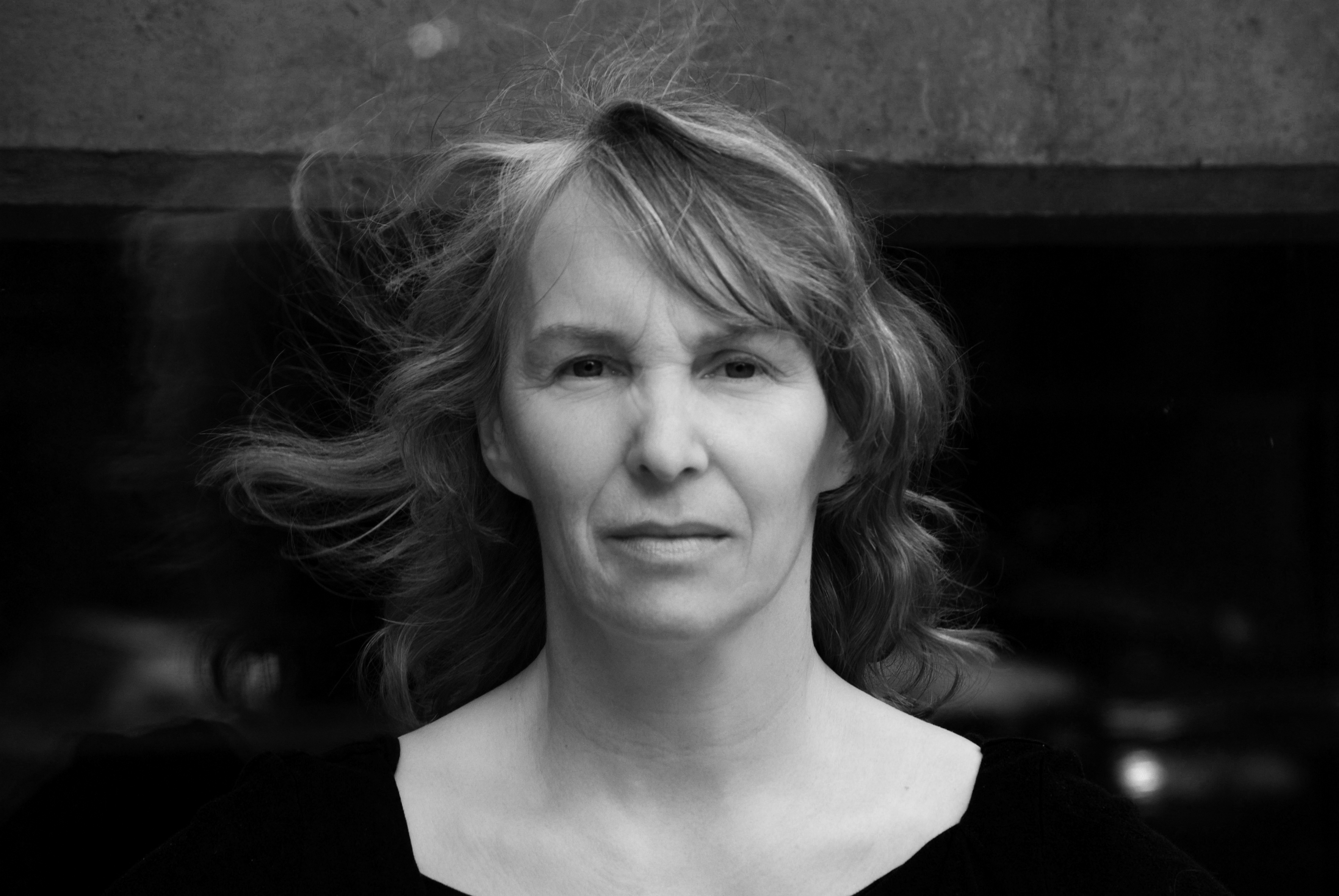
- Louise Bédard in 2008
- Born: May 26, 1955 (age 70); Drummondville, Quebec
- Occupations: Choreographer and dancer
- Website: lbdanse.org

Louise Bédard (born 1955) is a Canadian dancer, choreographer and teacher who is active on the contemporary dance.

== Biography ==
After completing her dance training, notably with Groupe Nouvelle Aire, Louise Bédard was quickly noticed as a talented performer. During the 1980s, she collaborated with many choreographers, among them Jean-Pierre Perreault, Paul-André Fortier, Ginette Laurin, Jeanne Renaud, Sylvain Émard. Already in 1984, Bédard was awarded the Canada Council’s Jacqueline-Lemieux Award, for her outstanding work. In 1987, she co-founded the Circuit-Est centre chorégraphique that currently provides her with rehearsal and creation space. A highly soft-after performer by a generation of choreographers, Louise Bédard formed her own company in 1990: Louise Bédard Danse. She is also one of the founding members of Circuit-Est Centre Chorégrahique and has been a guest professor at the Université du Québec à Montréal Dance Department from 2006 to 2010.

Throughout her career, she has received numerous awards such as the Jacqueline Lemieux Prize in 1983, the prestigious Prix d'Auteur des Rencontres chorégraphiques internationales de Seine-Saint-Denis in 1996 and the Jean A. Chalmers National Dance Award in 1997. More recently, she and her company were nominated as the dance finalist for the 2005 and 2016 Grand Prize of the Conseil des Arts de Montréal. She was awarded in November 2018 by The Prix de la Danse de Montréal in performance category for a solo in Tout ce qui va revient, a work by Catherine Gaudet presented in Théâtre La Chapelle.

Perspectives possibles and Braise blanche (1990) were among the company’s first productions followed by a male quartet, Les Métamorphoses clandestines (1992) and a women’s quintet Vierge noire (1993). In 1996, Louise Bédard Danse was awarded the Seine-Saint-Denis International Choreographer’s prize for her sextet creation Dans les fougères foulées du regard, and also received the Chalmers National Dance Award (1997) for both Cartes postales de Chimère and Dans les fougères foulées du regard. Urbania Box marked the end of a decade of intense contemporary dance creation.

In 2000, Bédard and Sylvain Émard co-created and produced the intimate duet Te souvient-il?. Presented in more than 50 international stages, the work received critical acclaim. Ever inspired by female artistes from beyond Canada, Bédard next embarked on a trilogy. The project included the duet Elles (2002), Ce qu’il en reste (2005), and Enfin vous zestes (2007). Bédard also created the solo La femme ovale. This intense period of creation is recognized by her nomination as the dance finalist for the Montreal Arts Council “Grand Prix” (2005).

In 2011, Louise Bédard initiated a new choreographic cycle entitled Séries solos a group of “on-site” dances presented until 2015 in over 30 events (Québec, France). Exploring further, Bédard created J'y suis (2013) an innovative quartet combining the “on-site” experience with that of a traditional staging format.

After Alors, on crée?, a workshop project for women (special nomination in the City of Montreal’s « Cultural Activity » Awards (2015), Louise Bédard returned to her 1996 creation, Cartes postales de Chimère, as one of the events celebrating Louise Bédard Danse’s 25th year of activity. Finally, in March 2016, Bédard began constructing her woman’s quintet, La Démarquise a work dedicated to the recognition of her identity as a female. During the same year, her company was the Montreal Arts Council dance finalist for the 31’st “Grand Prix” Award. Noted in the nomination was Louise Bédard’s constantly renewed contribution to Montréal’s artistic landscape, in particular Série Solos and the re-creation of Cartes postales de Chimère.

In November 2018, Louise Bédard received the City of Montréal Dance Prize, performance category.

== Artistic approach ==
Her choreographic work is strongly influenced by her personal background as a performer. Movement and the human dimension of dancers are always at the center stage of her works. Artistically, she has often drawn inspiration from other artists, especially women, notably Tina Modotti, Hannah Höch, Marianna Gartner and Paula Rego. With visual artists, she allows herself to be touched by the human condition expressed in their works, before transposing the form into a language that is specific to dance and choreography.

Bédard's choreography converges with her performance style, at once meticulous and infinitely subtle. Every gesture is clearly defined, from the flicker of a cheek muscle to the flexing of a fingertip. Lighting designs and sets are constructed with the same care as her movement. The works are layered; their collective impact is poignantly emotional, a revelation of delicacy and intellect.

== Awards and honours ==
2018: Prix de la Danse de Montréal - performer category

2016: Finalist in dance – 31st Grand Prix du Conseil des Arts de Montréal

2005: Finalist in dance – 21st Grand Prix du Conseil des Arts de Montréal

1997: John A. Chalmers National Dance Award

1996: Prix d’Auteur des 5e Rencontres chorégraphiques internationales de Seine-Saint-Denis

1983: Jacqueline Lemieux Prize

== Dance works ==
=== Solos ===
- 1989 : M'A
- 1990 : Braise Blanche
- 1990 : Quelque part
- 1991 : Dix stations
- 1992 : Manngärd
- 1995 : Elle ne se montre qu'aux siens
- 1996 : Cartes postales de Chimère
- 1997 : Créature
- 1999 : Cascando
- 1999 : Tragédie miniature
- 2003 : La Femme ovale, created in l'Agora de la danse, Montréal
- 2005 : Ex-Libris, created in Théâtre La Chapelle, Montréal
- 2011-2015 : Série Solos
- 2015 : Cartes postales de Chimère – re-enactment
- 2017 : La Robe de bois

=== Duets ===
- 1989 : Lapse
- 1989 : À l'ombre
- 1992 : Salon des regards perdus
- 2000 : Te souvient-il?, created in Théâtre La Chapelle, Montréal
- 2002 : Elles, created in Théâtre La Chapelle, Montréal
- 2004 : Vivement dimanche
- 2018 : Les Mains froissées

=== Ensemble works ===
- 1989 : F...électricité (trio)
- 1990 : Rive cour, rive jardin (quartet)
- 1991 : Les Métamorphoses clandestines (quartet)
- 1993 : Vierge Noire (quintette), created in Théâtre La Chapelle, Montréal
- 1994 : Promenade avec Walser (sextet)
- 1995 : Dans les fougères foulées du regard (sextet), created in l'Agora de la danse, Montréal
- 1997 : Esquisse à quatre mains pour quelques gestes inattendus (trio)
- 1999 : Urbania Box, je n'imagine rien (sextuor), created in l'Agora de la danse, Montréal
- 2000 : Tanka (trio)
- 2005 : Seven Ways to Tell Time (trio)
- 2005 : Ce qu'il en reste (sextet), created in l'Usine C, Montréal
- 2007 : Ces silences parmi les autres, commanded by Département de danse de l'Université du Québec à Montréal
- 2008 : Enfin vous zestes (sextet), created in l'Usine C, Montréal
- 2010 : Curieux les uns des autres, commanded dy Département de danse de l'Université du Québec à Montréal
- 2011 : Série solos (quartet)
- 2013 : J'y suis (quartet)
- 2016 : La Démarquise (quintet)
- 2017 : VU - Vibrations Urbaines (quartet)
- 2019 : Appeler l'instant où le paysage apparait (8 dancers) created in Spanish Pays-Basque thanks to Danztaz and Conseil des Arts et des Lettres du Québec
