= Oakville Ballet Company =

The Oakville Ballet Company is a ballet company in Oakville, Ontario, Canada.

== Oakville School of Classical Ballet ==
Oakville School of Classical Ballet is a renowned classical ballet school in Oakville, Ontario. It was founded by Elizabeth Paterson and is now owned by her daughter, Amanda Paterson. Oakville School of Classical Ballet provides training for beginners to professional students. The school is divided into the General and Professional Division. The latter provides intensive training for students who aspire for careers in the field. Students at the school are prepared for the Royal Academy of Dance and Cecchetti method exams, the Solo Seal award and the Genee Ballet Competition.

== Oakville Ballet Company - Oakville School of Classical Ballet ==
Oakville Ballet Company consists of students from the Oakville School of Classical Ballet, who are selected by audition. The company has a wide repertoire including Giselle, La Fille Mal Gardée, La Bayadère, Paquita, Swan Lake, La Sylphide, The Sleeping Beauty and its hugely popular annual The Nutcracker.

== The Nutcracker ==
The Oakville Ballet Company's The Nutcracker consists of dancers (both male and female) from the OBC (Oakville Ballet Company) and includes a male principal dancer from the National Ballet of Canada.
