= List of ballet companies in the United States =

This is a list of ballet companies in the United States.

Company	City	State	Years active	Web site
Ajkun Ballet Theatre	New York	New York	2000–present	www.ajkunbt.org
Alabama Ballet	Birmingham	Alabama	1981–present	www.alabamaballet.org
Alonzo King LINES Ballet	San Francisco	California	1982–present	linesballet.org
American Ballet Theatre	New York	New York	1939–present	abt.org
American Contemporary Ballet	Los Angeles	California	2011–Present	acbdances.com
American Repertory Ballet	New Brunswick	New Jersey	1963–present	americanrepertoryballet.org
Anaheim Ballet	Anaheim	California	1985–present	anaheimballet.org
Asheville Ballet	Asheville	North Carolina	1963–present	ashevilleballet.com
Aspen Santa Fe Ballet	Aspen / Santa Fe	Colorado / New Mexico	1996–present	aspensantafeballet.com
Atlanta Ballet	Atlanta	Georgia	1929–present	atlantaballet.com
Atlanta Festival Ballet	Stockbridge	Georgia	1989–present	atlantafestivalballet.com
Avant Chamber Ballet	Dallas	Texas	2012–present	avantchamberballet.org
Ballet 5:8	Chicago	Illinois	2012–present	ballet58.org
Ballet Arizona	Phoenix	Arizona	1986–present	balletaz.org
Ballet Arkansas	Little Rock	Arkansas	1978–present	balletarkansas.org
Ballet Austin	Austin	Texas	1956–present	balletaustin.org
Ballet des Amériques	Port Chester	New York	2011–present	balletdesameriques.com
Ballet Des Moines	Des Moines	Iowa	2002–present	balletdesmoines.org
Ballet Deviare	New York	New York	2003–present	balletdeviare.org
Ballet Etudes	Hialeah / Miami Beach	Florida	1974–present	balletetudesfla.com
Ballet Fantastique	Eugene	Oregon	2000–present	balletfantastique.org
Ballet Frontier	Fort Worth	Texas	2009–present	balletfrontier.org
Ballet Hispánico	New York	New York	1970–present	ballethispanico.org
Ballet Idaho	Boise	Idaho	1972–present	balletidaho.org
Ballet Magique	Los Angeles	California	1999–present	balletmagique.com
Ballet Magnificat!	Jackson	Mississippi	1986–present	balletmagnificat.com
Ballet Memphis	Memphis	Tennessee	1986–present	balletmemphis.org
BalletMet	Columbus	Ohio	1978–present	balletmet.org
Ballet Minnesota	Saint Paul	Minnesota	1987–present	balletminnesota.org
Ballet Mississippi	Jackson	Mississippi	1964–present	balletms.com
Ballet Nouveau Colorado	Broomfield	Colorado	2002–present	bncdance.com
Ballet Palm Beach	Palm Beach Gardens	Florida	2001–present	balletpalmbeach.org
Ballet Pensacola	Pensacola	Florida	1978–present	balletpensacola.com
Ballet Quad Cities	Rock Island / Quad Cities	Illinois	1996–present	balletquadcities.com
Ballet San Antonio	San Antonio	Texas	1985–present	balletsanantonio.org
Ballet Theatre of Maryland	Annapolis	Maryland	1978–present	balletmaryland.org
Ballet Theatre of Toledo	Toledo	Ohio	2005-present	ballettheatreoftoledo.org
Ballet Tucson	Tucson, Arizona	Arizona	2004-present	ballettucson.org
Ballet Vero Beach	Vero Beach	Florida	2014–present	balletverobeach.org
Ballet Virginia	Norfolk	Virginia	2008–present	balletvirginia.org
Ballet West	Salt Lake City	Utah	1963–present	balletwest.org
Ballet Wichita	Wichita	Kansas	1974–present	balletwichita.com
Ballet Wyoming	Cheyenne	Wyoming	2007–present	balletwyoming.com
BalletX	Philadelphia	Pennsylvania	2005–present	balletx.org
Ballets de San Juan	San Juan	Puerto Rico	1954–present	balletsdesanjuan.org
Les Ballets Trockadero de Monte Carlo	New York	New York	1974–present	trockadero.org
Bay Area Houston Ballet and Theatre	Houston / Bay Area	Texas	1976–present	bahbt.org
Boston Ballet	Boston	Massachusetts	1963–present	bostonballet.org
Brandon Ballet	Brandon	Florida	1995–present	brandonballet.org
Brighton Ballet Theater	Brooklyn	New York	1987–present	brightonballet.org
Brooklyn Ballet	Brooklyn	New York	2022–present	brooklynballet.org
California Riverside Ballet	Riverside	California	1969–present	crballet.net
California Ballet Company	San Diego	California	1968–2022	
Carolina Ballet	Raleigh	North Carolina	1997–present	carolinaballet.com
Central West Ballet	Modesto	California	1987–present	centralwestballet.org
Central Illinois Ballet	Peoria	Illinois	2015–present	ciballet.com
Charleston Ballet	Charleston	West Virginia	1955–present	thecharlestonballet.com
Charleston Ballet Theatre	Charleston	South Carolina	19??–2013	charlestonballet.com
Charlotte Ballet	Charlotte	North Carolina	1970–present	charlotteballet.org
Charlottesville Ballet	Charlottesville	Virginia	2007–present	charlottesvilleballet.org
Chattanooga Ballet	Chattanooga	Tennessee	1973–present	chattanoogaballet.net
Chicago Ballet	Chicago	Illinois	1910–19??	
Chicago Festival Ballet	Chicago	Illinois	1989–present	chicagofestivalballet.com
Cincinnati Ballet	Cincinnati	Ohio	1963–present	cballet.org
City Ballet of San Diego	San Diego	California	1993–present	cityballet.org
Cleveland Ballet	Cleveland	Ohio	2014–present	clevelandballet.org
Columbia Classical Ballet	Columbia	South Carolina		columbiaclassicalballet.com
Colorado Ballet	Denver	Colorado	1961–present	coloradoballet.org
Complexions Contemporary Ballet	New York	New York	1994–present	complexionsdance.org
Concert Ballet of Virginia	Richmond	Virginia	1976–present	concertballet.com
Dance Theatre of Harlem	Harlem / New York City	New York	1969–present	dancetheatreofharlem.org
Dayton Ballet	Dayton	Ohio	1938–present	daytonballet.org
Delta Festival Ballet	New Orleans	Louisiana	1969–present	deltafestivalballet.com
Deos Contemporary Ballet	Grand Rapids	Michigan	2018–present	deosballet.com
Diablo Ballet	Walnut Creek	California	1993–present	diabloballet.org
El Paso City Ballet	El Paso	Texas	2005–present	elpasocityballet.org
Eugene Ballet	Eugene	Oregon	1978–present	eugeneballet.org
Fargo Moorhead Ballet	Fargo	North Dakota	19??–present	fmballet.org
Festival Ballet Providence	Providence	Rhode Island	1978–present	festivalballetprovidence.org
Festival Ballet Theatre	Fountain Valley	California	1988–present	festivalballet.org
Hawkins Classical and Contemporary Ballet Company	Folsom	California	1996–present	hawkinsschool.com
Fort Wayne Ballet	Fort Wayne	Indiana	1956–present	fortwayneballet.org
Georgia Ballet	Marietta	Georgia	1960–present	georgiaballet.org
Golden State Ballet	San Diego	California	2021-present	goldenstateballet.org
Gwinnett Ballet Theatre	Snellville, Gwinnett County	Georgia	1977–present	gwinnettballet.org
Grand Rapids Ballet	Grand Rapids	Michigan	1971–present	grballet.com
Greensboro Ballet	Greensboro	North Carolina	1964–present	greensboroballet.org
Harkness Ballet	New York	New York	1964–1975	
Hollywood Ballet	Hollywood	California	2023–present	hollywoodballet.org
Houston Ballet	Houston	Texas	1969–present	houstonballet.org
Huntsville Ballet Company	Huntsville	Alabama	1964–present	huntsvilleballetcompany.org
Indianapolis Ballet	Indianapolis	Indiana	2017–present	indyballet.org
Island Moving Co.	Newport	Rhode Island	1982–present	islandmovingco.org
James Sewell Ballet	Minneapolis	Minnesota	1990–present	jsballet.org
Joffrey Ballet	Chicago	Illinois	1965–present	joffrey.org
Kansas City Ballet	Kansas City	Missouri	1957–present	kcballet.org
Kentucky Ballet Theater	Lexington	Kentucky	1989–present	kyballet.com
Ketchikan Theatre Ballet	Ketchikan	Alaska	1968–present	ktbdance.com
Lake Charles Civic Ballet	Lake Charles	Louisiana	1968–present	lakecharlescivicballet.com
Lexington Ballet	Lexington	Kentucky	1975–present	lexingtonballet.org
Lincoln Midwest Ballet Company	Lincoln	Nebraska	1989–present	lincolnmidwestballet.org
Littlefield Ballet (aka Philadelphia ballet)	Philadelphia	Pennsylvania	1935–1941	
Los Angeles Ballet	Los Angeles	California	2006–present	losangelesballet.org
Louisville Ballet	Louisville	Kentucky	1952–present	louisvilleballet.org
Madison Ballet	Madison	Wisconsin	1981–present	madisonballet.org
Magnum Opus Ballet	Madison	Wisconsin	2017–present	magnumopusballet.org
Maine State Ballet	Falmouth	Maine	1986–present	mainestateballet.org
Manassas Ballet Theatre	Manassas	Virginia	1983–present	manassasballet.org
Mendocino Ballet	Mendocino County	California	1984–present	mendocinoballet.org
Miami City Ballet	Miami	Florida	1986–present	miamicityballet.org
Milwaukee Ballet	Milwaukee	Wisconsin	1969–present	milwaukeeballet.org
Minnesota Ballet	Duluth	Minnesota	1965–present	minnesotaballet.org
Missouri Contemporary Ballet	Columbia	Missouri	2006–present	missouricontemporaryballet.com
Mobile Ballet	Mobile	Alabama	1987–present	mobileballet.org
Montana Ballet Company	Bozeman	Montana	1984–present	montanaballet.org
Montgomery Ballet	Montgomery	Alabama	1987–present	montgomeryballet.org
MorDance	New York	New York	2013–present	mordance.org
Morphoses	New York	New York	2007–present	morphoses.org
Moscow Ballet	Pittsfield	Massachusetts	1993–present	nutcracker.com
Mystic Ballet	Mystic	Connecticut	1997–present	mysticballet.org
Nashville Ballet	Nashville	Tennessee	1974–present	nashvilleballet.com
National Ballet Theater of Puerto Rico	Guaynabo	Puerto Rico	2005–present	balleteatropr.org
Neglia Ballet	Buffalo	New York	1994–present	negliaballet.org
Nevada Ballet Theatre	Las Vegas	Nevada	1972–present	nevadaballet.org
New Chamber Ballet	New York	New York	2004–present	newchamberballet.com
New Jersey Ballet	Livingston	New Jersey	1958–present	njballet.org New Mexico ballet company
New Orleans Ballet Theatre	New Orleans	Louisiana	2002–present	neworleansballettheatre.com
New York City Ballet	New York	New York	1948–present	nycballet.com
New York Theatre Ballet	New York	New York	1978–present	nytb.org
Northeastern Ballet Theatre	Dover	New Hampshire	2002–present	northeasternballettheatre.org
Northwest Arkansas Ballet Theatre	Bentonville	Arkansas	2011–present	nwaballettheatre.org
Oakland Ballet	Oakland	California	1961–present	oaklandballet.org
Oklahoma City Ballet	Oklahoma City	Oklahoma	1963–present	okcballet.com
Olympic Ballet Theatre	Edmonds	Washington	1981–present	olympicballet.org
Oregon Ballet Theatre	Portland	Oregon	1989–present	obt.org
Orlando Ballet	Orlando	Florida	1974–present	orlandoballet.org
Pacific Festival Ballet	Thousand Oaks, CA	California	1992–present	pacfestballet.org
Pacific Northwest Ballet	Seattle	Washington	1972–present	pnb.org
Palmetto City Ballet	Charleston	South Carolina	2014–present	www.palmettocityballet.org
Paradosi Ballet Company	Tacoma	Washington	2007–present	paradosiballet.org
Pasadena Civic Ballet	Pasadena, CA	California	1980–present	pcballet.com
Pasadena Dance Theatre	Pasadena, CA	California	1997–present	pasadenadancetheatre.org
Pas de Vie Ballet	Tallahassee	Florida	1989–present	pasdevieballet.com
Philadelphia Ballet (formerly Pennsylvania Ballet)	Philadelphia	Pennsylvania	1963–present	paballet.org
Pittsburgh Ballet Theatre	Pittsburgh	Pennsylvania	1968–present	pbt.org
Placer Theatre Ballet	Placer County	California	1998–present	placertheatreballet.org
Portland Ballet	Portland	Maine	1980–present	portlandballet.org
Richmond Ballet	Richmond	Virginia	1984–present	richmondballet.com
Roanoke City Ballet	Roanoke	Virginia	?–present	roanokeballet.org
Rochester City Ballet	Rochester	New York	1987–present	rochestercityballet.org
Sacramento Ballet	Sacramento	California	1954–present	sacballet.org
St. Louis Ballet	St. Louis	Missouri	?–present	stlouisballet.org
San Diego Ballet	San Diego	California	1990–present	sandiegoballet.org
San Francisco Ballet	San Francisco	California	1933–present	sfballet.org
Savannah Ballet Theatre	Savannah	Georgia	1998–present	savannahballettheatre.org
Sarasota Ballet	Sarasota	Florida	1987–present	sarasotaballet.org
Shreveport Metropolitan Ballet	Shreveport	Louisiana	1973–present	shreveportmetroballet.org
Smuin Ballet	San Francisco	California	1994–present	smuinballet.org
South Carolina Ballet	Columbia	South Carolina	1961–present	southcarolinaballet.com
The State Ballet of Rhode Island (SBRI)	Lincoln	Rhode Island	1960-present	stateballet.com
State Street Ballet	Santa Barbara	California	1994-present	statestreetballet.com
Suzanne Farrell Ballet	Washington	District of Columbia	2000–2017	kennedy-center.org
Tallahassee Ballet	Tallahassee	Florida	1972–present	tallahasseeballet.org
Texas Ballet Theater	Fort Worth / Dallas	Texas	1961–present	texasballettheater.org
The Florida Ballet	Jacksonville	Florida	1978–present	floridaballet.org
Toledo Ballet	Toledo	Ohio	1958–present	toledoballet.net
Tulsa Ballet	Tulsa	Oklahoma	1956–present	tulsaballet.org
Twin Cities Ballet	Lakeville	Minnesota	1996–present	
United States International Ballet	Wilmington	North Carolina	2017–2023	usinternationalballet.com
Virginia National Ballet	Manassas	Virginia	2013–present	virginianationalballet.org
Washington Ballet	Washington	District of Columbia	1976–present	washingtonballet.org
Wilmington Ballet Company	Wilmington	North Carolina	1999–2023	wilmingtonballetcompany.org

== See also ==
- List of dance companies

Yellowstone Ballet Co. Livingston Montana 1991 - present Yellowstoneballet.info
