= Kenneth von Heidecke =

American dancer (1952–2021)

- Born: December 30, 1952; Chicago
- Died: December 11, 2021 (aged 68)
- Occupations: Dancer choreographer
- Title: Founder and artistic director of Von Heidecke's Chicago Festival Ballet and Von Heidecke School of Ballet

Kenneth von Heidecke (December 30, 1952 – December 11, 2021) was an American dancer, choreographer, and the founder and artistic director of Von Heidecke's Chicago Festival Ballet and Von Heidecke School of Ballet.

== Early life ==
Kenneth von Heidecke was born in Cicero, Illinois, on December 30, 1952, to Laura (nee Perrelli) and Richard von Heidecke Sr. His mother spoke Italian as her first language and also spoke perfect English. She was described by Ken as "loving, effectionate, and a really good mother" who "lived for us (her children)".

== Dance career ==
Von Heidecke's professional career was launched in 1975, when he was chosen as one of two male dancers for George Balanchine's world premier of "Orfeo ed Euridice" with Lyric Opera Ballet in Chicago. During production of "Orfeo ed Euridice", von Heidecke was trained by legendary prima ballerina Maria Tallchief, one of the greatest American ballerinas. Von Heidecke continued his studies with Tallchief after the Orfeo production, and Tallchief became his mentor, coaching him in the Balanchine method and repertoire.

Von Heidecke continued dancing professionally with Chicago City Ballet, Lyric Opera Ballet, Columbus’ Ballet Met, National Ballet of Italy, and Arena di Verona of Italy. In 1981, however, a mid-air collision with another dancer completely severed the ligaments in his knees and his professional dance career ended.

== Choreography career ==
In 1983, von Heidecke returned to the world of dance as a choreographer and began staging works for Chicago City Ballet and Rockford Dance Company. In 1989, he commenced his international choreography career with the world premier of Les Sirenes at Scotland's Edinburgh Festival. His work received rave reviews from Britain dance critic, Nicholas Dromgoole, in London's Sunday Daily Telegraph.

From 1990 to 1996, von Heidecke choreographed for Kennedy Music Center Opera, Los Angeles Music Center Opera, and the 1996 U.S. Olympic Gymnastics Team. In 1997, he was invited to choreograph four premieres for An Evening of Ballet at the Badisches Staatstheater in Karlsruhe, Germany.

During the next decade, he choreographed for groups such as New York City Opera, San Francisco Opera, Dallas Opera, Lyric Opera of Chicago, National Ballet of Panama and San Diego Opera.

Von Heidecke has also coached numerous opera stars in stylized movement, including Plácido Domingo, Luciano Pavarotti, Denyce Graves, June Anderson, Viktoria Vizzen and Karita Mattila.

== Chicago Festival Ballet and School ==
In 1990, von Heidecke received a grant from the Chicago Artists' Coalition, which he used to found his professional ballet company, Chicago Festival Ballet, a troupe performing a repertoire of classical, romantic and neoclassical works in venues around the United States.

Also in 1990, von Heidecke opened the doors to the Von Heidecke School of Ballet in Naperville, Illinois, later expanding the school to include locations in Joliet, Illinois, and Chicago, Illinois. The school provides professional instruction in the Russian Vaganova method and Balanchine method, with curriculum designed for students wishing to pursue a professional career in dance.

Maria Tallchief has served as artistic advisor to the Chicago Festival Ballet and Von Heidecke School of Ballet since its founding. On November 7, 2006, The Metropolitan Museum of Art in New York presented a special tribute to Maria Tallchief titled "A Tribute to Ballet Great Maria Tallchief" where Tallchief officially named von Heidecke as her protégé.

== Death ==
Von Heidecke died on December 11, 2021, at the age of 68.

== Selected choreography ==
- Von Heidecke's Chicago Festival Ballet
  - The Nutcracker
  - Cinderella
- San Diego Opera
  - Aida (2008)
  - Samson and Delilah (2007)
  - Ariodante (2002)
  - Roméo et Juliette (1996)
- National Ballet of Panama
  - Dracula (2006)
- Lyric Opera of Chicago
  - Carmen (2005–2006)
  - Don Giovanni (2004–2005)
  - Samson and Delilah (2003–2004)
  - Lucia di Lammermoor (2003–2004)
  - Le nozze di Figaro (2003–2004)
  - Die Fledermaus (1999–2000)
  - Carmen (1999–2000)
  - La Gioconda (1998–1999)
  - Le nozze di Figaro (1997–1998)
- The Ghosts of Versailles (1996–1997)
  - Aida (1994–1995)
  - The Bartered Bride (1992–1993)
  - Un ballo in maschera (1992–1993)
  - Mefistofele (1991–1992)
  - Antony and Cleopatra (1991–1992)
  - Le nozze di Figaro (1991–1992)
  - L'elisir d'amore (1991–1992)
  - Alceste (1990–1991)
  - Eugene Onegin (1990–1991)
  - The Voyage of Edgar Allan Poe (1990–1991)
  - Lucia di Lammermoor (1990–1991)
  - Rigoletto (1990–1991)
  - Samson and Delilah (1989–1990)
  - Die Fledermaus (1989–1990)
  - Hamlet (1989–1990)
  - La sonnambula (1988–1989)
  - La traviata (1988–1989)
  - Aida (1988–1989)
  - Faust (1987–1988)
  - Le nozze di Figaro (1987–1988)
  - La forza del destino (1987–1988)
  - Un ballo in maschera (1986–1987)
- Dallas Opera
  - Don Giovanni (2003)
  - Turandot (2003)
  - Le nozze di Figaro (2002)
  - La traviata (2000)
  - Die Fledermaus (1999)
  - Un ballo in maschera (1998)
  - Ariodante (1998)
  - Turandot (1997)
- Carmen (1996)
  - The Tempest (1996)
  - Roméo et Juliette (1995)
  - La traviata (1993)
  - Jenůfa (1993)
  - Eugene Onegin (1992)
  - Le nozze di Figaro (1991)
- San Francisco Opera
  - Samson and Delilah (2007)
  - Jenůfa (2001)
- New York City Opera
  - Ariodante (1999)
  - An Evening of Ballet at Badisches Staatstheater, Karlsruhe, Germany (1997)
  - Palazzo d'oro
  - Elegie
  - Les Sirenes
  - Classical Symphony.
- U.S. Olympic Gymnastics Team (1996)
- Los Angeles Music Center Opera (1990–1995)
- Le nozze di Figaro
- Rigoletto
- Kennedy Music Center Opera
  - Aida (1990)
- Scotland's Edinburgh Festival
  - Les Sirenes (1989)
