= Cleveland Ballet (disambiguation) =

The Cleveland Ballet was a ballet company founded in 1972 in Cleveland, Ohio. Cleveland Ballet may also refer to:

- Cleveland Ballet (founded 1935)
- Cleveland Ballet (founded 2014)
