= Shen Yun =

Performing arts company affiliated with the Falun Gong

Shen Yun Performing Arts
- Formation: August 16, 2006; 20 years ago
- Founder: Practitioners of Falun Gong
- Type: 501(c)(3) organization
- Tax ID no.: 20-8812402
- Purpose: Dance, symphony orchestra
- Headquarters: Deerpark, New York, U.S.
- Website: www.shenyun.org

Shen Yun
- Traditional Chinese: 神韻藝術團
- Simplified Chinese: 神韵艺术团
- Literal meaning: "Divine rhythm arts troupe"
Transcriptions
Standard Mandarin
- Hanyu Pinyin: Shényùn yìshù tuán
- Wade–Giles: Shen^{2}-yün^{4} i^{4}-shu^{4} t'uan^{2}
- IPA: [ʂə̌n.yn î.ʂû tʰwǎn]
Hakka
- Pha̍k-fa-sṳ: Sṳ̀n-yun Ngi-su̍t-thòn
Yue: Cantonese
- Yale Romanization: Sàhn wahn ngaih seuht tyùhn
- Jyutping: San^{4} wan^{6} ngai^{6} seot^{6} tyun^{4}
Southern Min
- Hokkien POJ: Sîn-ūn gē-su̍t thôan
- Tâi-lô: Sîn-ūn gē-su̍t thuân
Eastern Min
- Fuzhou BUC: Sìng-ông ngiê-sŭk tuàng

Shen Yun Performing Arts (Chinese: 神韻藝術團; lit. 'divine rhythm arts troupe') is an American nonprofit performing arts company that produces touring performances of dance and symphonic music. It is operated by the new religious movement Falun Gong, founded in 2006 and led by Li Hongzhi. It comprises eight performing ensembles, with approximately 480 performers, and has performed internationally.

The company is promoted by The Epoch Times, a Falun Gong-affiliated media outlet that has been variously described as far-right, right-wing, and conservative. In 2019, an NBC News assessment concluded that the Epoch Media Group and Shen Yun "make up the outreach effort of Falun Gong".

Shen Yun presents its performance as a revival of traditional Chinese culture before the rise of communism. Each Shen Yun performance consists of approximately 20 independent vignettes—primarily dance, along with an instrumental piece and two vocal performances. Shen Yun performances incorporate Falun Gong teachings, including promotion of the Dafa, or "Great Way", and religious beliefs concerning the salvation of humanity. They also present negative views of evolution and atheism.

Shen Yun performances are organised by local nonprofit organisations, generally run by Falun Gong adherents, which promote the show and assume responsibility for performance costs and potential losses. The finances of Shen Yun and Falun Gong appear to be linked, with technically separate corporations sharing funds, executives, and the same mission. Its shows are heavily promoted through advertising blitz campaigns in local markets.

Shen Yun has attracted controversy over its religious messaging, financial practises and treatment of performers. Allegations against the organization has included forced child labor, emotional abuse and manipulation, financial coercion, and discouraging performers from seeking medical treatment for injuries on religious grounds.

== History ==
In 2006, a group of expatriate Falun Gong practitioners living in North America founded Shen Yun in New York. The stated purpose of the company was to revive Chinese culture and traditions from the time before the Chinese Communist Revolution. In a journal article analyzing Falun Gong's geopolitics, scholar Weihsuan Lin wrote: "Shen Yun’s ‘reviving five thousand years of civilization’ attempts to question and separate the entanglement between the Party and the State; it enacts, globally, an alternative geopolitical discourse in which a culturally rich and prosperous China without the CCP existed in the past and is coming again in the near future."

In 2007, the company conducted its first tour with 90 dancers, musicians, soloists, and production staff. Early shows were titled "Chinese Spectacular", "Holiday Wonders", "Chinese New Year Splendor", and "Divine Performing Arts", but now the company performs exclusively under the name "Shen Yun". By 2009, Shen Yun had developed three full companies and orchestras that toured the world simultaneously. By the end of the 2010 season, approximately one million people had seen the troupes perform.

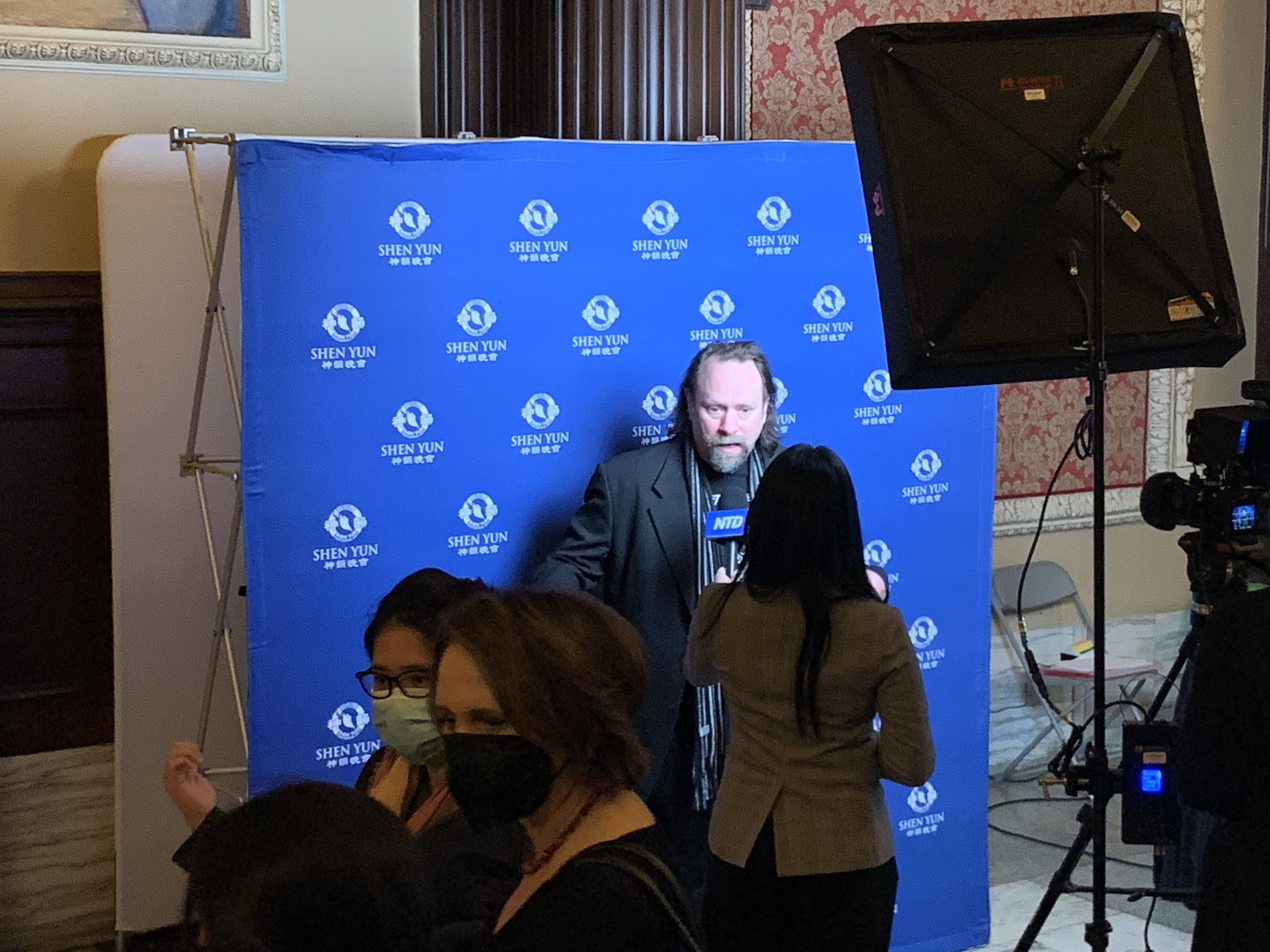
New Tang Dynasty Television interview being conducted inside the State Theatre in Cleveland, Ohio, during a Shen Yun performance. The television broadcaster is affiliated with Falun Gong.

Shen Yun, the media organization The Epoch Times, and a variety of other organizations operate as extensions of Falun Gong. Los Angeles–based investigative reporter Samuel Braslow described Shen Yun's background in March 2020:

"Both Shen Yun and Epoch Times are funded and operated by members of Falun Gong, a controversial spiritual group that was banned by China's government in 1999 [...] Falun Gong melds traditional Taoist principles with occasionally bizarre pronouncements from its Chinese-born founder and leader, Li Hongzhi. Among other pronouncements, Li has claimed that aliens started invading human minds in the beginning of the 20th century, leading to mass corruption and the invention of computers. He has also denounced feminism and homosexuality and claimed he can walk through walls and levitate. But the central tenet of the group's wide-ranging belief system is its fierce opposition to communism. In 2000, Li founded Epoch Times to disseminate Falun Gong talking points to American readers. Six years later he launched Shen Yun as another vehicle to promote his teachings to mainstream Western audiences. Over the years Shen Yun and Epoch Times, while nominally separate organizations, have operated in tandem in Falun Gong's ongoing PR campaign against the Chinese government, taking directions from Li."

Editor Chris Jennewein of MyNewsLA wrote that Los Angeles Magazine was sued for defamation in May 2020 by The Epoch Times over an article by Braslow, Inside the Shadowy World of Shen Yun and Its Secret Pro-Trump Ties. The lawsuit challenged, among other statements, Braslow's description of the publication as "a fiercely pro-Trump conspiracy website" and his reporting that "Facebook had removed over 600 accounts tied to Epoch Times". In September 2020, the case was dismissed "without any costs or fees" after a federal judge George H. Wu signed off on an agreement between the two parties in which Los Angeles Magazine had agreed to retract the article.

In 2024, The New York Times reported that former performers have filed a major class-action lawsuit alleging that Shen Yun isolated young performers and requiring them to work 13 to 16 hours a day for little to no pay. In 2025, the paper reported that the U.S. Department of Homeland Security, the State Department, and Manhattan federal prosecutors were conducting a criminal investigation into Shen Yun, including possible visa fraud and labor and financial misconduct, including cash smuggling and arranging sham marriages to keep students in the country. In August 2026, U.S. District Judge Philip M. Halpern denied Shen Yun's motions to dismiss a separate class-action lawsuit alleging human trafficking and child exploitation, allowing most of the claims to proceed.

Shen Yun Performing Arts, founded in New York in 2006 by Falun Gong practitioners, tours internationally with performances depicting traditional Chinese culture. The company has reported security incidents, including threats and vandalism, which it attributes to actors linked to the Chinese Communist Party, in the context of China's longstanding restrictions on Falun Gong since 1999. In 2026, Shen Yun made headlines after a fake bomb threat prompted the evacuation of Prime Minister Anthony Albanese's residence. ABC News reported that there was no evidence that the Chinese government was behind the threat.

== Marketing ==
Promotional campaigns for a local performance are typically funded by local Falun Gong associations. The Epoch Times also runs frequent promotional stories about Shen Yun dance troupe. The New Yorker's review of Shen Yun called The Epoch Times "the world's foremost purveyor of Shen Yun content". In 2024, The New York Times reported that The Epoch Times has published at least 17,000 articles related to Shen Yun since 2009. According to the newspaper, articles about Shen Yun were reviewed by approved staff members before publication, who had been instructed to filter out material considered unfavorable to the dance company.

Shen Yun promotes itself as offering "a presentation of traditional Chinese culture as it once was" or a vision of "China before communism". It is heavily promoted in major cities with commercials, billboards, and brochures displayed in streets and in businesses, as well as in television and radio profiles. In a 2019 article in The New Yorker, Jia Tolentino wrote, "The ads have to be both ubiquitous and devoid of content so that they can convince more than a million people to pay good money to watch what is, essentially, religious-political propaganda—or, more generously, an extremely elaborate commercial for Falun Dafa’s spiritual teachings and its plight vis-à-vis the Chinese Communist regime." Shen Yun's advertising blitz campaigns have inspired several internet memes.

The same article reported that a Shen Yun host claimed that both ballet and gymnastics had borrowed the traditional techniques of Chinese classical dance and that their performers were showing a tradition that was thousands of years old that could no longer be found in communist China. Emily Wilcox, a professor of Chinese studies at the University of Michigan who had studied Chinese classical dance at the Beijing Dance Academy for a year and a half, disputed these claims. Wilcox recalled finding it "hilarious" and "so ridiculous" when a group promoting Shen Yun told her that Chinese dance was banned in China. She explained that Chinese classical dance is a relatively a new art form that developed in China in the 1950s and had become one of the predominant forms of dance in the country's contemporary art world. Asked whether she had heard that ballet or gymnastics originated from Chinese classical dance, Wilcox replied that she had not.

Regional Falun Gong groups also present or sponsor Shen Yun performances, which has been banned by the Chinese government. Some audience members have objected to the show's promotion strategy, which does not note the religious- and political-themed content of the performance. Jim Kershner of The Spokesman-Review reported that while the show contained "a religious-political message", "[t]he vast majority of the show, however, has no overt message. It is dedicated mainly to keeping alive the traditional forms of Chinese music and dance that were suppressed during the Cultural Revolution of the 1960s and in subsequent decades." Chicago Tribune’s Gisela Orozco also noted that Shen Yun offered, "in a few passages, critical allusions to the communism that governs its country of origin, but without abounding on the subject."

== Content ==
=== Dance ===
Large-scale group dance is at the center of Shen Yun productions. Each touring company consists of about 40 male and female dancers, who mainly perform modern version inspired by classical Chinese dances, making extensive use of acrobatic and tumbling techniques, forms and postures.

Shen Yun's repertoire draws on stories from Chinese history and legends, such as the legend of Mulan, Journey to the West and Outlaws of the Marsh. It also depicts "the story of Falun Gong today". During the 2010 production, at least two of the 16 scenes depicted "persecution and murder of Falun Gong practitioners" in contemporary China, including the beating of a young mother to death, and the jailing of a Falun Gong protester. In addition to classical Han Chinese dance, Shen Yun also includes elements of Yi, Miao, Tibetan and Mongolian dance.

Shen Yun performs three core elements of classical Chinese dance: bearing (emotion, cultural and ethnic flavor), form (expressive movements and postures), and technical skill (physical techniques of jumping, flipping, and leaping). Shen Yun choreographer Vina Lee has stated that some of the distinct Chinese bearing (yun) has been "lost in the process" since the cultural changes of the Chinese Communist Revolution.

=== Music ===
Shen Yun dances are accompanied by Chinese instruments: the pipa, suona, dizi, guzheng, and a variety of Chinese percussion instruments. A full Western orchestra leads the melodies. There are solo performances featuring Chinese instruments such as the erhu in between dances. Interspersed between dance sequences, other than the erhu performances, are operatic singers performing songs which sometimes invoke spiritual or religious themes, including references to the Falun Gong faith. A performance in 2007, for instance, included a reference to the Chakravartin, a figure in Buddhism who turns the wheel of Dharma.

The music for Shen Yun was composed by Jing Xian and Junyi Tan. Three of Shen Yun's performers—flutist Ningfang Chen, erhuist Mei Xuan and tenor Guan Guimin—were recipients of the Chinese Ministry of Culture's "National First Class Performer" awards. Prior to joining Shen Yun, Guan Guimin was well known in China for his work on soundtracks for more than 50 movies and television shows. Other notable performers include erhu soloist Xiaochun Qi.

=== Costume and backdrops ===
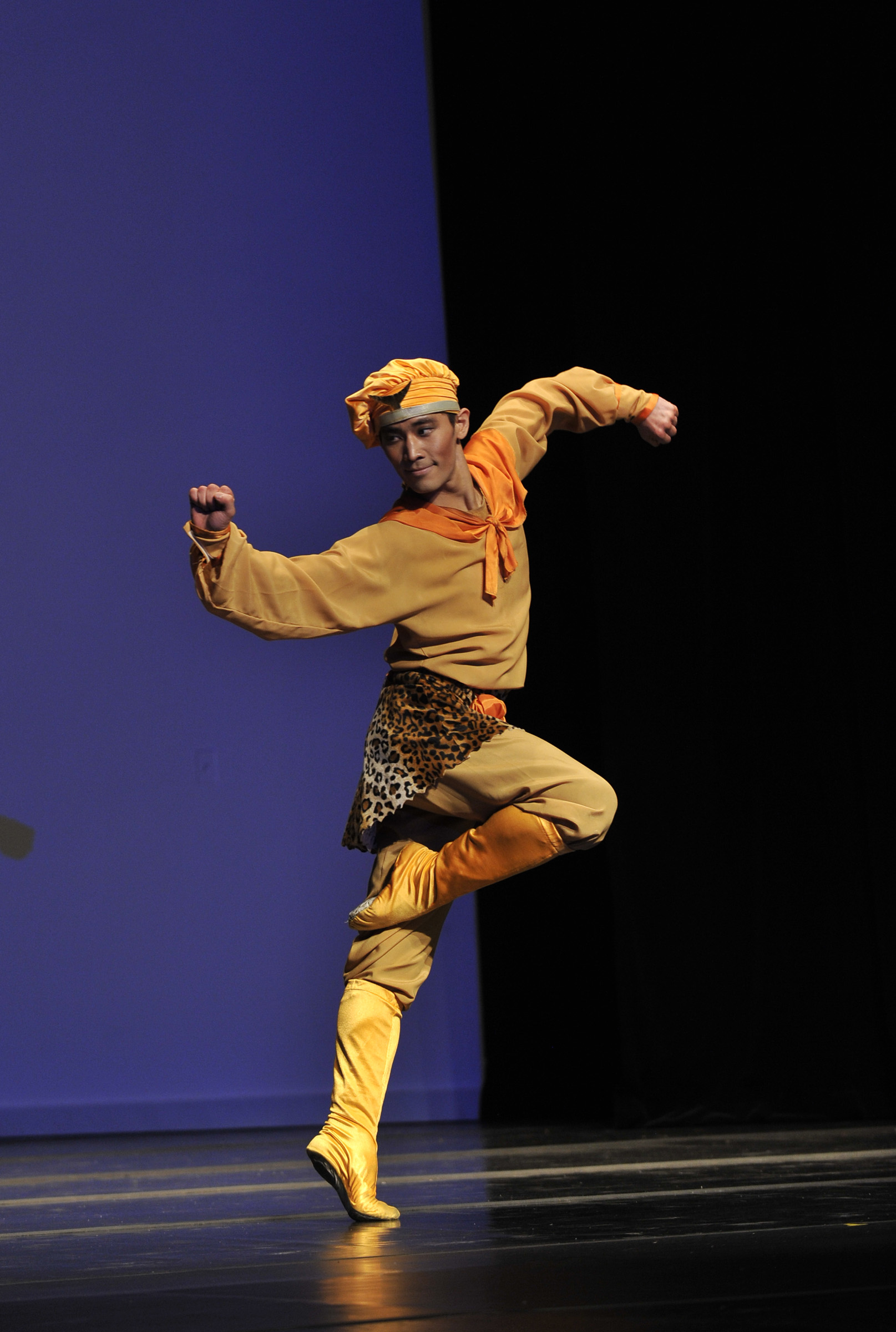
Shen Yun dancer Seongho Cha performing in 2009

Shen Yun's dancers perform wearing intricate costumes, often accompanied by a variety of props. Some costumes are intended to imitate the dress of various ethnicities, while others depict ancient Chinese court dancers, soldiers, or characters from classic stories. Props include colorful handkerchiefs, drums, fans, chopsticks, or silk scarves.

Each Shen Yun piece is set against a digitally projected backdrop, usually depicting landscapes such as Mongolian grasslands, imperial courts, ancient villages, temples, or mountains. Some backdrops contain moving elements, such as digital versions of the dancers, that integrate with the performance.

== Finance ==
In 2024, The New York Times published an investigation into the financial operations of Shen Yun. The newspaper noted that Shen Yun itself does not "routinely" pay for the billboards, television ads or fliers promoting its performances, or generally cover the costs of venue, ticket sales and performers' accommodation and meals. Instead, these expenses were found to be covered largely by local nonprofit organizations that are referred to as "presenters".

These nonprofits are run by Falun Gong adherents who work as unpaid volunteers whose contacts could require them to accept the responsibility for all costs incurred and be liable for losses, claims "and expenses of every kind and description" in regards to staging Shen Yun performances in their local area.

These non-profit organizations spends millions of dollars annually on venue hire, advertising, and ticket sales. They keep only enough from ticket sales to cover their expenses while any profit is sent to Shen Yun. If ticket sales cannot sufficiently cover their expenses, it still sends money to Shen Yun while it remains responsible for making up the shortfall.

According to The New York Times, practitioners can feel immense pressure to sell Shen Yun tickets, as Li Hongzhi has taught that ticket sales are "an indicator of how devoted they are to his teachings".

By 2024, Shen Yun accumulated $266 million in assets mainly through ticket sales and by keeping its costs down through numerous volunteer hours and sometimes taking the personal savings of Falun Gong adherents. In 2015, Shen Yun performers were asked to carry $10,000 in cash - the maximum a person can legally carry in without reporting - back to the US after performing in Spain, surrendering the money to Shen Yun management upon arrival. The New York Times described the arrangement as a possible attempt to circumvent U.S. currency reporting requirements.

== Reviews ==
Sid Smith of Chicago Tribune wrote that a 2008 Shen Yun performance was "more uneven" than other cultural performances he had seen, but that the women dancers were "a beautiful and haunting ensemble" with "a nimble mastery of traditional talents." Sarah Crompton of The Daily Telegraph wrote of a 2008 Shen Yun performance: "This show is advertised as a Chinese spectacular – a kind of Eastern version of Cirque du Soleil. It is nothing of the kind. Acrobatics, singing and dancing skills are used in the service of a propaganda exercise on the part of Falun Gong ... But what I really object to is that such a politically motivated performance is being smuggled on to stages around Europe in the name of family entertainment."

Regina Weinreich wrote in a HuffPost blog that Shen Yun's debut at Lincoln Center in 2011 "enacts the rich cultural heritage of China" and noted some descriptions of oppression in the performance. Fashion designer Donna Karan and her Urban Zen foundation hosted celebrities at an opening night and said, "I love when it gets into the soul". Laura Falcoff, writing in the Argentinian newspaper Clarín, described Shen Yun in 2012 as a "spectacular production that beautifully combines China's ancient traditions with cutting-edge technological advancements" and called it an "ideal performance for audiences of all ages, especially children." Carmen Del Val of the Spanish newspaper El País wrote that a 2014 performance was "an explosion of color and energy". Rachel Molenda of Charleston Gazette-Mail wrote of a 2015 Shen Yun performance at the Clay Center, where the audience gave a standing ovation, "The pairing of projected backgrounds and animation with real-time performance (dance and orchestral) was surreal. Sometimes I questioned whether the musicians, whose compositions were lovely, were really there." Gisela Orozco of Chicago Tribune wrote that a 2016 Shen Yun performance emphasized "the cultural part and faith that existed before in China," presented "fables told with dance and music, which talk about philosophy, literature and art”, and expressed values “such as loyalty, kindness, bravery, love”.

The 2018 and 2019 performances included lyrics and digital displays disparaging atheism and belief in evolution as "deadly ideas", leading to complaints by some attendees that the shows resembled a religious sermon. An article in the Minnesota Star Tribune said the political message of Shen Yun "feels more like propaganda than straightforwardly presented cultural heritage." Jia Tolentino wrote in The New Yorker that a scene in the show contained homophobia. Alix Martichoux from the Houston Chronicle wrote, "For many disgruntled Shen Yun attendees, it's not necessarily that the show itself is bad – though to be fair, some complain it is. Most of the negative reviews were people upset they were blindsided by the political content." Tolentino described a scene: "Chairman Mao appeared, and the sky turned black; the city in the digital backdrop was obliterated by an earthquake, then finished off by a Communist tsunami. A red hammer and sickle glowed in the center of the wave [...] a huge, bearded face [disappeared] in the water [...] a tsunami with the face of Karl Marx."

Pablo M. Díez of the Spanish newspaper ABC wrote in 2023, "Shen Yun's shows are a dazzling combination of dance and music with synchronized choreography in majestic settings."

Emily Needham of The Washington Post drew parallels between Shen Yun and Cold War-era U.S. State Department cultural diplomacy programs, describing both as being "built on the idea that dance can transcend language differences and build mutual understanding with audiences through a shared cultural experience." She concluded: "Today’s Shen Yun performances are grand, with a large cast of 180 brilliant dancers, spectacular sets and bright colors. Dance can be beautiful while also performing political arguments. They are not mutually exclusive."

In a 2024 Los Angeles Review of Books article, Arielle Gordon stated that Shen Yun diffuses Falun Gong's homophobia and misogyny.

In a review of the 2026 performance, Keith Bramich of Classical Music Daily wrote that in addition to dance and live orchestral music, "particularly impressive was the effect of dancers moving from the stage into the video backdrop and vice-versa." He described his overall experience as "a highly entertaining but slightly puzzling afternoon of traditional Chinese culture."

== Tours ==
Shen Yun's eight companies tour for six months each year, performing in over 130 cities in North America, Europe, Asia, Australia, and Latin America. Notable venues include the David H. Koch Theater at New York's Lincoln Center in Manhattan; the London Coliseum in London, England; the Dutch National Opera and Ballet in Amsterdam, Netherlands; and the Kennedy Center Opera House in Washington, D.C. By the conclusion of Shen Yun's 2010 performance, an estimated one million people had seen the performance worldwide. During Shen Yun's 2024 season, the company's eight touring troupes performed over 800 shows on five continents.

Shen Yun does not perform in China due to opposition from the Chinese government, which Shen Yun representatives allege is based on its depictions of political repression in the country as well as expressions of traditional Chinese cultural history that the CCP government has tried to suppress. The Chinese government has attempted to cancel Shen Yun performances abroad through political pressure exerted by its foreign embassies and consulates. The Chinese People's Political Consultative Conference, a political consultative body, have expressed concern that state-funded art troupes have been less popular internationally than Shen Yun. Shen Yun was scheduled to perform in Hong Kong in January 2010, but the tour was cancelled after entry visas were refused to their production crew.

In February 2020, Shen Yun was the subject of accusations of its dancers spreading the coronavirus from Asia to the United States. Health officials in Utah dismissed the rumors.

On February 20, 2025, the John F. Kennedy Center for the Performing Arts was evacuated following a bomb threat specifically targeting Shen Yun’s scheduled performances, though nothing was found and all shows continued as planned with increased security. Shen Yun representatives stated that they received 50 similar threats over the past three months, alleging they were part of a Chinese government campaign against the group. In March 2025, multiple Taiwanese government agencies, including the Mainland Affairs Council and Taichung City Government, received bomb threats targeting a Shen Yun tour in Taiwan. Investigators traced their origin to the area of Huawei’s Xi’an Research Institute in Shaanxi, China. Authorities determined them to be hoaxes, and the tour proceeded as scheduled with increased security measures.

During Shen Yun's 2025 tour in South Korea, Kangwon National University notified the group on April 16 that it was canceling the contract for the May performances at its venue, due to protests from the Chinese Embassy in South Korea. However, the Chuncheon District Court later granted Shen Yun's application for an injunction to prohibit interference with the performances originally scheduled.

In February 2026, ahead of a tour in Australia, Prime Minister Anthony Albanese was evacuated from his residence after Shen Yun received a message threatening that explosives would be detonated there if the group's performances were not cancelled. The Chinese government denied any involvement in the threats.

Prior to Shen Yun's performances in Vancouver in April 2026, the Vancouver Police Department received a report regarding an email stating that explosives were placed and calling for a cancellation of the performances. The email was determined to be a hoax by police. Cybercrime officers also discovered that the email address was connected to a phone number inside China. Prior to these performances, representatives of the Chinese consulate met with a Vancouver city employee in an alleged attempt to stop the performances. Shen Yun's prior performances in Toronto were cancelled after an unfounded bomb threat, and were rescheduled for June 2026 with increased security measures. Investigators have found that a number of the threats targeting the company share similar language and nature, and that some were traced to China.

== Falun Gong and Dragon Springs compound ==
Shen Yun operates out of Falun Gong's headquarters in the 427-acre (1.73 km^{2}) Dragon Springs compound in Deerpark, New York, where it has large rehearsal spaces. Dragon Springs is registered as a religious property under the church name Dragon Springs Buddhist.

According to NBC News: "The Epoch Media Group, along with Shen Yun, a dance troupe known for its ubiquitous advertising and unsettling performances, make up the outreach effort of Falun Gong, a relatively new spiritual practice that combines ancient Chinese meditative exercises, mysticism and often ultraconservative cultural worldviews. Falun Gong's founder has referred to Epoch Media Group as 'our media', and the group's practice heavily informs The Epoch Times' coverage, according to former employees who spoke with NBC News. The Epoch Times, digital production company New Tang Dynasty Television, and the heavily advertised dance troupe Shen Yun make up the nonprofit network that Li calls 'our media'. Financial documents paint a complicated picture of more than a dozen technically separate organizations that appear to share missions, money and executives."

Between 2009 and 2024, The Epoch Times published 17,000 articles related to Shen Yun. In 2024, The New York Times reported that many Falun Gong practitioners considered performing in Shen Yun a "sacred honor" because Li taught that the shows served to demonstrate the virtues of his teachings and the evil of the Chinese Communist Party, are the "most important project" in his religion, and are part of his quest "to save humanity from a coming apocalypse". According to Li, audience members can be "saved" by "absorbing Shen Yun's message".

== Chinese government actions ==
Shen Yun shares Falun Gong's opposition to communism and presents itself as an organization that strives to revive traditional Chinese culture, which it claims the Chinese Communist Party (CCP) sought to destroy. Experts have described Shen Yun as participating in a broader competition between Falun Gong and the Chinese government over who can best represent "authentic" Chinese culture.

Since 1999, the Chinese government has characterized Falun Gong as a "cult". Chinese consulates in Sydney and Melbourne have described Shen Yun as "a political tool used by the Falun Gong cult under the guise of spreading traditional Chinese culture to promote its cult doctrines and amass wealth". The Chinese government has also sought to cancel its performances abroad by pressuring theaters and governments. or sending letters or e-mails to theaters in multiple countries, including Ireland, Germany, South Korea and Sweden. As of 2019, more than sixty such attempts had been documented across the world, including in Europe and North America. In 2010, pressure from the Chinese government caused Shen Yun shows in Romania, Greece, Moldova and Ukraine to be cancelled. In 2017, the Royal Danish Theatre declined to host Shen Yun due to pressure from the Chinese embassy in Copenhagen. According to Shen Yun, the Chinese government also attempted to cancel Shen Yun's performance in Hong Kong by rejecting the entry visas of six members.

In 2019, the Royal Opera of Madrid scheduled several performances of Shen Yun. Madrid opera sold 900 tickets for the performances, but canceled the event. The Royal Opera claimed technical problems, but the then Chinese ambassador to Madrid Lü Fan said in a recording that it had been he who had pressured and given directions to the theatre to cancel the performance using technical issues as a pretext.

In November 2024, a man was sentenced for acting on behalf of the Chinese government in bribing an Internal Revenue Service agent to take away Shen Yun's tax exemption status.

== Symphony orchestra ==
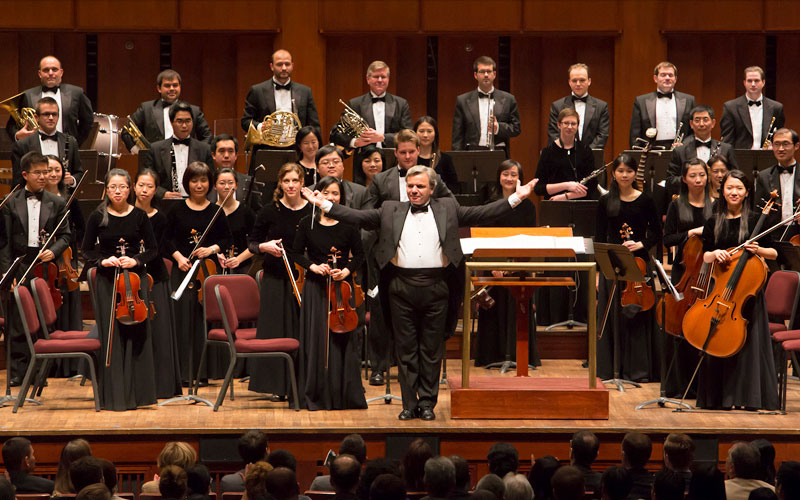
Milen Nachev with Shen Yun Symphony Orchestra at Kennedy Center

In October 2012, Shen Yun's symphony orchestra made its debut performance at Carnegie Hall in New York. The performance featured conductors Milen Nachev, Keng-Wei Kuo, and Antonia Joy Wilson, and the program included both classical works such as Beethoven's Egmont Overture and Antonio Vivaldi's Concerto in C Major, as well as original compositions that fuse Chinese and Western instruments.

In 2013, the symphony orchestra toured seven American cities. In addition to Carnegie Hall, it performed at the Kennedy Center in Washington, D.C. In 2023, the orchestra made its debut at David Geffen Hall in New York, with classical works and original compositions.

== Criticism and controversies ==
Shen Yun has been criticized for the treatment of its dancers.

=== 2024 New York Times investigation ===
A 2024 New York Times investigation alleged that Shen Yun routinely discouraged performers from seeking medical care for injuries and enforced grueling rehearsal and tour schedules through emotional abuse and manipulation. They report that Shen Yun recruits underage dancers and musicians to work long hours with little pay. Evan Glickman, a percussionist that travelled with Shen Yun for two years, stated that two-thirds of the musicians were students and "That place would not run if they had to pay real musicians, like every other organization in the country does." A violinist, Eugene Liu, started working for Shen Yun at 15 and stayed with the group for 2 years, but never made more than $300 a month despite working on over 200 shows. In a later interview, Liu compared the stipend he received from Shen Yun to that of a collegiate student-athlete. Shen Yun stated on its website that 85% of its performers are adults, and that student performers receive $50,000 worth of scholarships per year to attend Shen Yun-affiliated schools that are registered with the New York State Education Department or accredited by the New England Commission of Higher Education. Shen Yun said the Times “cherry-picked” a few cases to cast broad implications that were unrecognizable to current and former performers.

The Times further stated that dancers were often hesitant to seek medical attention when injured or unwell, as practitioners of Falun Gong hold the belief that true adherence to their principles can enable individuals to overcome illness or injury without external intervention. Li Hongzhi, the founder and leader of Falun Gong, played a significant role in the creation of Shen Yun. He encouraged performers to engage in meditation as a means to address injuries, suggesting that such physical issues stemmed from spiritual imbalances. As a result, some dancers continued to perform despite experiencing injuries such as dislocated kneecaps and sprained ankles, in order to avoid any perception of disloyalty to Li. Yet, Dr. Damon Noto stated that he has treated several Shen Yun dancers. Dr. Jingduan Yang, CEO of Northern Medical Center, stated that the center treats two to three Shen Yun performers every month and that injured performers receive immediate treatment so they can recover and return to the performance.

Leaders of Shen Yun reportedly used both religious and financial pressure to discourage performers from leaving. Shen Yun leaders made claims that performers who leave will lose Mr. Li's "divine" protection", potentially leaving them vulnerable to "hell" or other dangers. Additionally, seven former performers recounted being told that if they chose to resign from Shen Yun, they would be required to repay the costs associated with their education, housing, and living expenses provided under full scholarships, potentially amounting to hundreds of thousands of dollars. They said, however, that there was no follow-through on these repayment demands. Shen Yun denied the allegations. On its website, it published a petition that it said was signed by 1,550 people including family members, current and former performers, including dancers, musicians and performance staff, calling the allegations as “gross distortions.” Damon Noto, a physician employed by Shen Yun, said that claims that treatment was discouraged did not match what he has personally observed or what was noted in his medical records. Former dancer Mingye Liu said he had a positive experience with Shen Yun and it is a company with a sense of mission and pride where many top artists joined and stayed.

=== Government inquiries and legal proceedings ===
In November 2024, the New York State Department of Labor opened an inquiry into Shen Yun following the New York Times's reporting. That same month, a former dancer for Shen Yun sued the group, Li and other defendants, alleging that Shen Yun is subjecting children working for it to harsh conditions, including working for long hours with little pay. Shen Yun alleged that the lawsuit was part of a coordinated offensive orchestrated by the Chinese regime.

In February 2025, The New York Times reported that federal authorities are conducting a criminal investigation into Shen Yun, focused at least in part on possible visa fraud. The Times reported that the organisation's leaders had allegedly tried to set up foreign students with American citizens in relationships for the purpose of issuing visas.

=== 2026 Radio France Internationale investigation ===
A 2026 investigation by Radio France Internationale (RFI), which interviewed former dancers and followers of Falun Gong, reported allegations of psychological abuse. One former dancer told RFI they had been "brainwashed" to view physical strain as not being abuse and would constantly push their limits, because they regarded suffering as vital to eliminate their "karmic debt". Another reflected a similar view and stated, "It was so deeply ingrained in us to reject Western medicine that our fragile minds told us we couldn’t go to the hospital. It would disappoint Master Li. It would be a sin."

Former followers also described intense religious beliefs surrounding Li. A former Falun Gong member of 13 years told RFI that the fundamental belief within the movement was that Li was not "simply God but the Buddha Lord of all gods". A former dancer similarly said they felt they were in the presence of a "supreme divine being" whenever Li visited.

John Smithies, who practiced Falun Gong for two decades and held a senior role in The Epoch Times, told RFI he witnessed a Shen Yun dancer tell a room of performers that if they made a mistake in their performance, the "audience will lose their chance to remain on Earth for eternity". Smithies criticized this as placing undue psychological pressure on dancers, some of whom were around 14 and 15 years old. A former dancer told RFI that, as children, they were taught by Falun Gong that their "entire existence" was to save "sentient beings" because the apocalypse was coming.

Smithies told RFI that some followers of Falun Gong eventually volunteered long hours of 10 to even 16 hours a day to the movement's projects, and said that Shen Yun ticket sellers worked at shopping malls without pay. Smithies said that "Li Hongzhi built an empire thanks to free labour". Former followers have also criticized Li's lifestyle. Rob Grey, a former member of Falun Gong, said "He lives like a king in his complex while followers sacrifice their lives, accumulate debts and live under constant pressure."

== See also ==
- Dance in the United States
