= Gladisa Guadalupe =

American artistic director

Gladisa Guadalupe is an American artistic director. She was the co-founder and former artistic director of the current Cleveland Ballet, founded in Cleveland, Ohio in 2014.

== Life and career ==
A native of San Juan, Puerto Rico, Guadalupe began her classical ballet training with Ballets de San Juan, becoming one the company's youngest members. As a young teenager, Guadalupe relocated to the United States on a scholarship to study under George Balanchine, father of American ballet, at the prestigious School of American Ballet in New York City.

Upon completing her studies, Guadalupe became a Principal Dancer, performing with the Ballets de San Juan, Ballet Nuevo Mundo de Caracas, Cleveland San Jose Ballet, and the second incarnation of Cleveland Ballet (1972–2000). She has danced under choreographers George Balanchine, Dennis Nahat, Ian Horvath, Margot Sappington, Ana Garcia, John Butler, Choo San Goh, and Louis Falco. Guadalupe has toured North America, South America, Asia, and Europe as a Principal Dancer.

In 2000, Guadalupe founded the Cleveland School of Dance (now known as the School of Cleveland Ballet). In addition to serving as the school's Director and Principal teacher, Guadalupe has also been an adjunct instructor for the Cecchetti Council of America, American Ballet Theatre, Ballet de San Juan, Ballet San Jose, Ohio Ballet, Rochester School of Ballet, and the University of Akron.

== Cleveland Ballet ==
In 2014, Guadalupe and Ukrainian businessman Michael Krasnyansky, founded a new incarnation of Cleveland Ballet to fill the city's void of a resident professional ballet company. The company has grown from 5 to 26 professional dancers, who have represented a total of 11 different nations in the initial five seasons. A resident company of Playhouse Square, Cleveland Ballet has earned critical acclaim and is one of the fastest growing ballet companies in the U.S.

In July 2015, Guadalupe was invited to serve on the Alumni Advisory Committee on Diversity and Inclusion at the School of American Ballet, official school of the New York City Ballet. She has received recognition as a Distinguished Teacher in the Arts and for Promotion of Excellence in the Arts by the National Foundation for Advancement in the Arts. Her extensive ballet experience as a Principal Dancer combined with her B.S. degree in psychology from Cleveland State University gives her a unique perspective as both a teacher and choreographer.

For her exceptional work with the ballet as its artistic director, Guadalupe received the YWCA's Women of Achievement award in 2021. In 2022, she was honored with an Ohio Arts Council Governor's Award under its Arts Administration category for her leadership and artistic vision in both the school and company.

Guadalupe was fired from her position as executive director at the Cleveland Ballet on January 11, 2024, after an investigation instituted by the board found acts of impropriety including using ballet funds for personal expenses and nepotism. She and her husband, Michael Krasnyansky, former CEO of the Cleveland Ballet who resigned in October 2023, denied the allegations.

In July 2025, Cleveland Ballet published an announcement in Arts Air of the settlement of disputes with former artistic director, Gladisa Guadalupe. The announcement noted that "The Cleveland Ballet wishes to acknowledge the important contribution that Ms. Guadalupe made in reestablishing classical ballet in Cleveland." In addition, "The Cleveland Ballet wishes Ms. Guadalupe and Mr. Krasnyansky well in their future endeavors."
