= Marion Gridley =

American historian

Marion Eleanor Gridley
- Born: 16 November 1906; White Plains, New York
- Died: 31 October 1974 (aged 67)
- Education: Northwestern University
- Occupation: Historian
- Spouse: Robinson Johnson

Marion Gridley (16 November 1906 – 31 October 1974) was an American historian of Native Americans.

== Life and work ==
Marion Eleanor Gridley was born in White Plains, New York, on 16 November 1906. She married Robinson Johnson on 15 May 1932, but they divorced in either 1947 or 1948. Gridley published Indians of Today in 1936 and edited Indian Legends of American Scenes three years later. In 1940 she wrote Indians of Yesterday, following it with The Story of Pocahontas in 1948 and then Hiawatha in 1950. She attended Northwestern University in 1954–1955, then started working in public relations while freelance writing. Gridley compiled America’s Indian Statues in 1966. For the Indian Nations Series published by Putnam, she produced volumes covering the Iroquois, Pontiac, Osceola, Navajo, Haida, Sioux and Seminole tribes between 1969 and 1973. In 1972 Gridley wrote Contemporary American Indian Leaders and followed it with American Indian Women and a biography of Maria Tallchief in 1973. She was adopted by the Omaha and Winnebago tribes. Gridley died on 31 October 1974.
