= Schoch =

Schoch is a surname of German origin. Notable people with the surname include:

- Knut Schoch, German tenor
- June Schoch, (1926-2008), New Zealand athlete
- Philipp Schoch (born 1979), Swiss snowboarder
- Robert M. Schoch, American geologist and pyramid theorist
- Sally Schoch (born 1934), American painter
- Simon Schoch (born 1978), Swiss snowboarder
- Tim Schoch (born 1949), American novelist and humorist
