= Gilberto Cárdenas =

American sociologist (1947–2026)

- Born: 19 April 1947; San Gabriel, California, U.S.
- Died: July 26, 2026 (aged 79); Austin, Texas, U.S.
- Occupations: Sociologist, art collector
- Spouse: Dolores García

Gilberto Cárdenas (April 19, 1947 – July 26, 2026) was an American sociologist and art collector. According to the American Austin-Statesman, he was an authority on the Chicano Movement and Latino art. In 2023, he donated 7,000 artworks to the University of Texas at Austin's Blanton Museum of Art. He died on July 26, 2026, at the age of 79.

== Education ==
Raised near Los Angeles, California, Cárdenas earned an associate's degree from East Los Angeles College in 1967, and then a bachelor’s degree from California State University, Los Angeles in 1969. At the University of Notre Dame, he earned a master's degree in sociology and then, in 1975, a doctoral degree in sociology. As a graduate student, he studied with Julián Samora and they co-authored Los Mojados: The Wetback Story, which has been described as "a seminal 1971 nonfiction book. . .that explored immigration to the U.S. by undocumented Mexicans and dissected the various dynamics at play in migrant workers’ lives."

== Career ==
Cárdenas began teaching at the University of Texas at Austin as an assistant professor in 1975 after completing his doctorate. He achieved tenure and remained there until 1999. His research continued to focus on immigration and Latino Studies. His testimony concerning the public education of children who were not "legally admitted" to the United States was cited in the opinion issued by the Supreme Court in Plyler v. Doe (1982). In 1995, the Inter-University Program for Latino Research (IUPLR), a national consortium of research centers from twenty-one U.S. universities moved its headquarters to the University of Texas at Austin. He then served as its executive director for eighteen years, and when he left Texas to join the faculty of Notre Dame University, IUPLR relocated its headquarters to Notre Dame University as well. At Notre Dame, he also became the founding director of its Institute of Latino Studies and served in that role until 2012 and held the Julian Samora Chair in Latino Studies. He also served Notre Dame as assistant provost and as the executive director of Notre Dame Center for Arts and Culture (2012–2017). His final role was professor emeritus of sociology. He was eulogized by Alex E. Chávez of Notre Dame as "indispensable to the development of Latino studies across the United States."

Cárdenas was also the founding executive director of the NPR radio show, Latino USA. While at the University of Texas at Austin in the early 1990s, the Center for Mexican American Studies wanted to begin a radio show. Cárdenas contacted Maria Martin, then Latino Affairs Editor on NPR's national desk, and they developed Latino USA, which premiered May 5, 1993.

== Art Collection ==
Gilberto Cárdenas and his wife Dolores Garcia opened Galeria Sin Fronteras (Gallery Without Borders) in Austin, Texas in 1986. He had begun "collecting Chicano art when the first La Causa prints were made by Cesar Chavez's followers during the United Farm Workers' Organizing Committee movement," and they wanted to provide a commercial marketplace that would "showcase Latino artists who were leaders in developing an aesthetic that aimed to change society, politics, and the Latino community." As a physical space, the gallery was open until 1999, but the collection continues through gift or loan to galleries around the United States. In 2023, Cárdenas and Garcia donated 6,000 artworks to the Blanton Museum of Art at the University of Texas at Austin. Another donation of about 2,000 works went to Chicago’s National Museum of Mexican Art. Other recipients include Smithsonian American Art Museum in Washington, D.C. and the Snite Museum of Art at the University of Notre Dame.

== Honors & Legacy ==
In October of 2025, the University of Nevada Reno, one of the IUPLR member institutions, hosted the 7th Biennial Siglo XXI Conference in honor of the career and legacy of Gilberto Cárdenas. In 2026, the National Museum of Mexican Art included an ofrenda made in his honor by his former student Brookes Ebetsch, now executive director of the Chicago Artists Coalition, as part of their annual Día de Muertos exhibit.
