= Seongho Cha =

Korean dancer

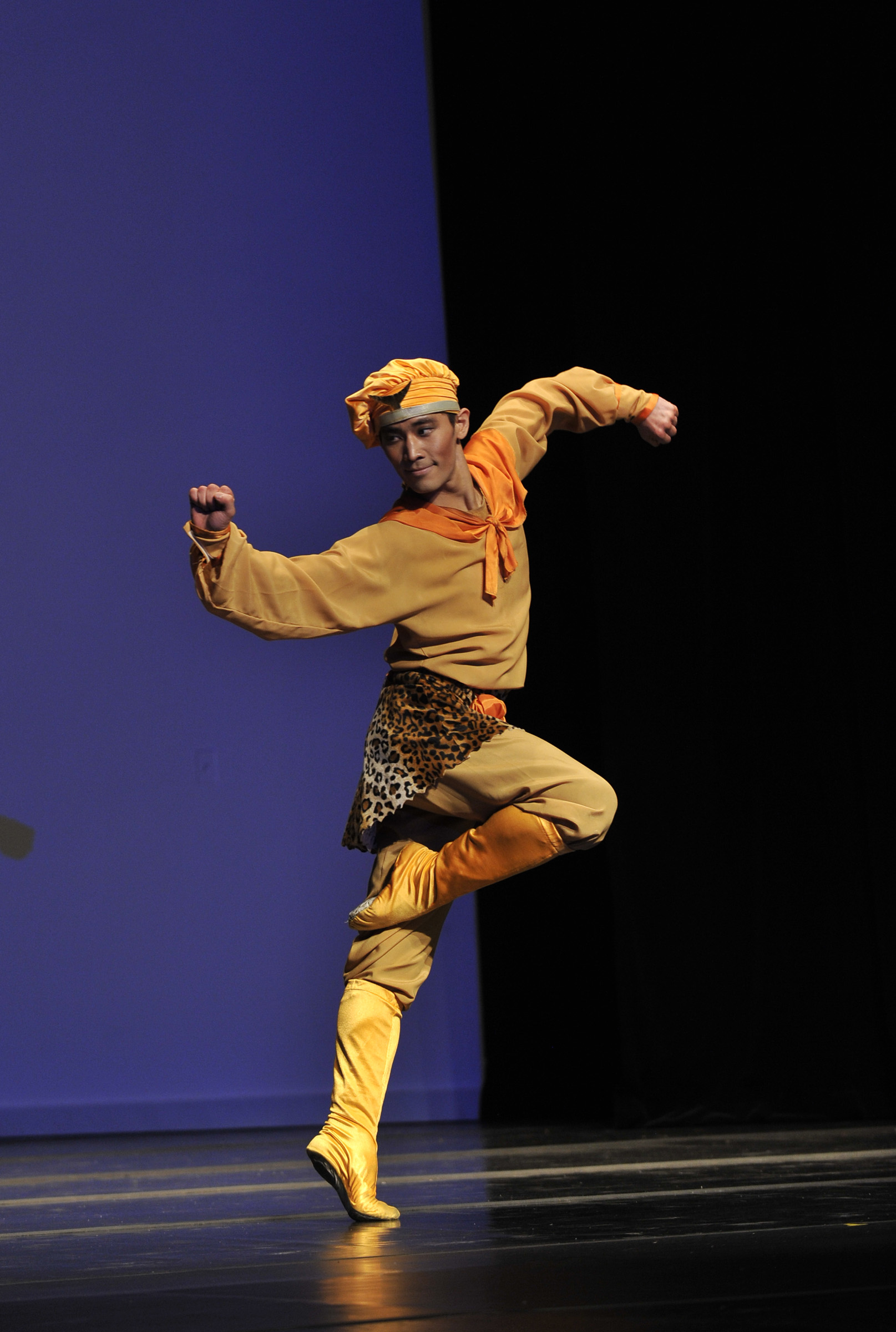
- Seongho Cha performing in 2009
- Born: South Korea
- Other name: Jimmy Cha
- Occupation: Dancer
- Years active: 2002–present

Korean name
- Hangul: 차성호
- RR: Cha Seongho
- MR: Ch'a Sŏngho

Seongho Cha (Korean: 차성호; also known as Jimmy Cha) is a South Korean dancer currently with the New York-based Shen Yun Performing Arts. Cha began dancing at the age of 15 and rose to prominence in his home country of South Korea, winning top honors at a national ballet competition and going on to represent South Korea at the 2006 USA International Ballet Competition.

== Life and career ==
Cha joined Anaheim Ballet in 2002 as a soloist and principal dancer. He subsequently won a full scholarship to study dance at Point Park University, where he was called a "resident powerhouse technician." While dancing the lead role of Ichabod Crane at a Pittsburgh Playhouse production of Sleepy Hollow in 2004, Cha was lauded as a "complete package…a deceptively intelligent dancer." Cha graduated with a BA in dance from the Conservatory of Performing Arts in 2006 and continued his studies at New York University. Cha had also previously attended Sejong University in Seoul. He has an interest in Oriental medicine and has sought to find ways of combining the philosophy of traditional medicine with his dance.

In 2008, Cha made the transition from ballet to classical Chinese dance, joining the Falun Gong-run Shen Yun Performing Arts as a principal dancer.
