= Antonia Joy Wilson =

American conductor

Maestra Antonia Joy Wilson is a professional conductor of international acclaim who has performed at Carnegie Hall and is a guest conductor worldwide (see Video #1 below). Antonia was the First Prize Winner of an International Classical Music Festival: Conducting Competition in Mexico. Antonia Joy Wilson is a music director of over eight American orchestras and she has extensive experience with classical, pops, choral, opera, gospel, dance, ballet, mime, jazz, country, storytelling, multimedia and multiple arts concert repertoire. Currently, as artistic director of Global Arts Center & Multimedia Symphony collaborating in XR Visual Worlds in development, Maestra Wilson thrives on entrepreneurial enterprises. Antonia has a vision of "Arts Access for All" and she is passionate about creating diversity through multimedia performances. Maestra Wilson conducted the international South American tour with Shen Yun Performing Arts based in New York. She made her debut conducting the Colorado Symphony Orchestra at the age of 21, making her the youngest woman to conduct a major American orchestra. She later went on to serve as a music director and conductor for seven American orchestras. In addition, she has performed a guest conductor role in Europe, Latin America, North America, and Asia. In 1996, she was the first prize winner at the International Classical Music Festival's conducting competition held in Mexico.

== Education ==
Wilson began studying the violin at the age nine, and later received a full scholarly to attend the St. Louis Conservatory of Music. She received a Bachelor of Music degree at the University of Denver, and earned a Master of Music degree from the University of Southern California. She attended Yale School of Music for conducting studies, and then returned to Colorado to complete her Doctor of Musical Arts Degree in orchestral conducting at the University of Colorado at Boulder. Wilson has taught at the university level with several university faculties, including a position as Director of Orchestral Studies and music director with the Central Michigan University Symphony Orchestra.

== Career ==
Antonia Joy Wilson has performed extensively in Europe and North America, and has previously served as Artistic Director & Conductor with Midland Center for the Arts: Midland Symphony Orchestra (2008-2011); Guest Conductor for the San Francisco Sinfonietta (2003-2008); Resident Principal Guest Conductor for the Bulgarian National Radio Symphony Orchestra (2001-2003). In addition, she has been conductor for the Imperial Symphony Orchestra in Florida (1998-2001), the Jefferson Symphony Orchestra in Colorado (1994-1999), and the Livingston Symphony Orchestra in New Jersey (1990-1994), among others. She has held several guest conductor positions and tour engagements in Latin America, Europe, Asia and North America. In 2011, she joined New York-based Shen Yun Performing Arts to serve as conductor for its international orchestra. Antonia Joy Wilson has been noted by several sources as an example of women gaining ground in the field of conducting, which has historically been dominated by men. She was one of several women noted in a Los Angeles Times article on women cracking the “glass podium” of conducting by being appointed to positions in major American orchestras.
