= Guan Guimin =

Chinese operatic tenor (1946–2022)

- Born: 1946; Changzhi, Shanxi province, China
- Origin: Beijing
- Died: September 2022 (aged 75–76)
- Genres: Bel canto
- Occupation: Opera singer
- Years active: 1983–2022

Guan Guimin (1946 – September 2022) was an operatic tenor who worked in China in the 1980s before eventually moving to the United States. His style integrated Italian Bel canto with Chinese vocal methods, and was described as having a pure, bright tone.

Guan was born in 1946 in Changzhi, Shanxi province to a family of vegetable farmers. In 1983, he completed graduate studies in Chinese music and opera, and then began performing with the China Conservatory’s experimental orchestra. He was named a national first class performer by China's Ministry of Culture, was received by future Chinese leader Hu Jintao, and went on to record songs for dozens of films and television shows in China. Guan performed internationally as a solo tenor with Shen Yun Performing Arts from 2006.

Guan died of liver cancer in September 2022.

== See also ==
- Partial listing of Guan Guimin’s recordings, Amazon.com
