= Sally Schoch =

American artist and abstract painter

- Born: Sally Davis; 1934 (age 91–92); Joliet, Illinois
- Education: School of the Art Institute of Chicago, University of Miami, University of Chicago
- Known for: Painting, fiber arts
- Movement: Abstract art

Sally Schoch (born 1934) MFA is an American artist and abstract painter living in Wilmette, Illinois. She received her Master of Fine Arts degree from the School of the Art Institute of Chicago. Schoch has worked in fiber arts and painted in oils and watercolor, and is most known for her abstract paintings of flowers. Schoch has received commissions for works by Marshall Field's, Bank of America, and other organizations. She is a member of the Wilmette Art Guild and the Chicago Artists' Coalition. Her work has been exhibited primarily in the Midwestern United States

== Personal life ==
Sally Davis was born in 1934 in Joliet, Illinois Her parents were George, an oil salesman, and Agnes Davis, both of whom were born in Illinois. Sally was the fifth child. Her elder siblings were Mary Ann, Jo Ann, Suzanne, and George. All five children were born within a six-year period. The family lived on Glenwood Avenue in Joliet, Illinois.

She attended Farragut Grade School, and graduated from Joliet Township High School in 1952. Sally Davis married Richard Schoch about 1963. He was born on January 13, 1931, to Harry and Helen Schoch; He had two brothers, Harry and Tom. Richard Schoch graduated from Joliet Township High School in 1949, three years before his wife. He attended Northwestern University and then worked for Jack Daniel's distillery. They had four children: Bret, an investment banker; Brad, an architect; Kari, an art wholesaler; and Brandon, who works in the restaurant industry. In 2003, they had three grandchildren. Sally and Richard Schoch lived in Wilmette, Illinois.

Her husband, Richard died on May 21, 2010; he was living in Wilmette at the time of his death.

== Education ==
She studied at School of the Art Institute of Chicago earning a Bachelor of Fine Arts and, in 1962, a Master of Fine Arts degree in drawing and painting. Schoch also studied at the University of Miami and the University of Chicago.

== Art career ==
After graduating from the School of the Art Insititue, Schoch worked briefly as a commercial artist. When her children were young, she focused on weaving and later she resumed painting. She has been painting in oils for more than 40 years and specializes in abstract flower and portrait paintings. She believes that abstract art is "the marriage of imagination, spontaneity and color." A notable fiber arts work is Opus 535, which was commissioned by The Oakton Community College Educational Foundation in 1992. It is a tapestry wall hanging of an architectural landscape. The weaving, like a detailed bas relief, is a "narrative assemblage [that] brings together a sense of history and community."

Schoch has been commissioned by Marshall Field's, Bank of America, the Chubb Corp., and the American Meat Export Association in Denver, Colorado to create paintings. Her works have been exhibited at the Art Institute of Chicago, Marshall Field's, the National College of Education in Evanston, Ruth Volid in Chicago, and at other locations in northern Illinois and southwestern Michigan. She made Sports Star, a sculpture for the Winnetka Community House, Winnetka, Illinois.

She was one of the artist whose works were auctioned to benefit the Joanne Silverman Memorial Fund. Some of the proceeds were used to support early ovarian cancer detection. Her work was exhibited that year at the Wilmette Village Hall and the Wilmette Arts Guild's Festival of Arts.

Schoch made a unique tapestry of modern-day Jerusalem in memory of Patricia Flint, a friend's sister. It was dedicated on June 16, 2002, and hangs in the narthex of First Presbyterian Church of Joliet.

In 2005 she was one of 80 artists that participated in the Wilmette Festival of Fine Arts. The two-day event was run by the Wilmette Arts Guild. The same year, she was one of the local artists that contributed a painted outdoor umbrella for The Deer Path Art League's 50th anniversary gala. She is one of the Art Institute of Chicago's barewall artists of 2007, 2008 and 2009. From May 20 through August 5, 2011, a reception entitled "Celebrating Experience" was held in Evanston, Illinois, with watercolor paintings by Schoch and John Martin. Services for Adults Staying in Their Homes (SASI) received 20% of the proceeds. Robe of Roses was exhibited at the "Women's Journeys in Fiber" exhibition at the Anderson Arts Center (Kenosha, Wisconsin) in 2013.

Her work is available at the Deer Path Art League, a non-profit organization to cultivate arts in the Chicago’s North Shore.

Schoch has been a member of the Wilmette Arts Guild and the Chicago Artists' Coalition.
