= Tallchief =

Tallchief is a surname. Notable people with the surname include:

- Maria Tallchief (1925–2013), American ballerina
- Marjorie Tallchief (1926–2021), American ballerina
