= Ballet Des Moines =

Ballet company in Iowa

General information
- Name: Ballet Des Moines
- Previous names: Ballet Theatre of Des Moines
- Year founded: 2002
- Founding artistic director: Julie Grooters
- Location: Des Moines, Iowa
- Principal venue: Hoyt Sherman Place
- Website: balletdesmoines.org

Artistic staff
- Artistic director: Eric Trope
- Resident choreographers: Tom Mattingly

Ballet Des Moines is a ballet company based in Des Moines, Iowa.

== History ==
The company was founded in 2002 as the Ballet Theatre of Iowa. Previously, the city had been served for by Ballet Iowa for three decades; however, that company had gone defunct in 1997 following financial mismanagement Ballet Des Moines staged its first show, The Nutcracker, that winter and its first spring show, Swan Lake and Divertimento, the following spring.

In 2005, Serkan Usta, a longtime star of Tulsa Ballet, was named artistic director. In 2006, the company renamed itself Ballet Des Moines. In 2012, the company hired its own professional resident dancers for the first time.

In November, 2021, former Ballet West principal dancer Tom Mattingly was named artistic director of Ballet Des Moines. Under Mattingly, the company grew from 9 dancers in 2021 to 22 in 2025.

In the summer of 2025, Mattingly transitioned to the role of Resident Choreographer. Following a national artistic director search, Eric Trope was named artistic director of Ballet Des Moines. Trope is a former Miami City Ballet dancer and continues to stage works internationally for choreographer Justin Peck.

== Performances ==
Ballet Des Moines perform at various locations in Des Moines, most often at Hoyt Sherman Place and the Civic Center of Greater Des Moines.

== Education and development ==
Ballet Des Moines offers open classes for students and adults at the Ballet Des Moines Campus for Arts and Education in downtown Des Moines. Additionally, the annual production of The Nutcracker uses more than 150 local young dancers. The company regularly performs the Nutcracker in small towns across the state, utilizing local students to round out the cast.

Ballet Des Moines also offers a trainee program for dancers ages 18-24 who are working towards becoming professional dancers. This program gives trainees the opportunity to dance with company as well as hone their skills in order to prepare them for a professional career.

== Dancers ==
2026/2027 Ballet Des Moines company dancers, apprentices, and trainees:

Company Dancers:

- Eliana Price
- Amelia Grubb Hillman
- Logan Hillman
- Chiyo Nishida
- Cameron Miller
- Rune Houchin
- Savannah Cox
- Noah Klarck
- Megan Boyette
- Eddie Kidd
- Gabriel Hartman
- Jordan Powers

Apprentices:

- Judith Bruggeman
- Blaise Houchin

Trainees:

- Evelyn Beard
- Scout Claussen
- Tess Cogley
- Ren Livingston
- Sophia Millen
- Lucy Weber

== See also ==
- List of ballet companies in the United States
