= Ballet Tucson =

Professional ballet company in the Tucson, Arizona

General information
- Name: Ballet Tucson
- Year founded: 1986
- Founder: Mary Beth Cabana
- Website: ballettucson.org

Artistic staff
- Artistic Director: Margaret Mullin

Other
- Official school: School of Ballet Tucson

Ballet Tucson is a professional ballet company based in Tucson, Arizona.

As of June 2023, the company has 4 principal dancers, 5 soloists, 4 demi-soloists, and 8 members of the corps de ballet. They also have 9 apprentices.

== History ==
Ballet Tucson, previously known as Ballet Arts Foundation, was established in 1986 by Mary Beth Cabana, who was previously a principal dancer with Cleveland Ballet, Ballet Oklahoma, Arizona Dance Theatre, and San Diego Ballet. The goal of creating Ballet Tucson was to create a world-class professional ballet company as well as a ballet school that would help young dancers in Southern Arizona pursue a career in dance.

In 1987, the Children's Ensemble gave a preview performance at Centennial Hall (Tucson, Arizona) in Tucson, and received positive reviews. Additional performances that year also received positive reviews.

In 1994, Ballet Tucson premiered their own full-length version of The Nutcracker, which had five sold-out performances.

In 2004, the professional ballet company debuted, and since that time has established itself as Tucson's resident professional ballet company.

In 2022, Ballet Tucson began a partnership with the Tucson Symphony Orchestra for their performances of The Nutcracker.

== Current company ==
=== Artistic team & staff ===
Margaret Mullin joined as the Artistic Director in spring 2022. She was previously a soloist with Pacific Northwest Ballet.

Chieko Imada is the Associate Artistic Director & Resident Choreographer. She was previously a soloist with Inoue Ballet of Tokyo, and a former principal dancer for Ballet Tucson.

== School of Ballet Tucson ==
The School of Ballet Tucson is the official school of Ballet Tucson. It has provided training to students since 1986.
