= Chicago Festival Ballet =

American ballet company

Chicago Festival Ballet is a professional ballet company performing a repertoire of classical, romantic and neoclassical works in venues around the United States. Chicago Festival Ballet is also known as Von Heidecke's Chicago Festival Ballet. Chicago Festival Ballet's sister organization and educational arm is the Von Heidecke School of Ballet.

== History ==
In 1989, choreographer Kenneth von Heidecke founded Chicago Festival Ballet as a not-for-profit ballet company with a grant from the Chicago Artists' Coalition. The company received further support and notoriety from prima ballerina Maria Tallchief, who was named Chicago Festival Ballet's artistic advisor.

== Today ==
Currently, Chicago Festival Ballet consists of professional dancers from the United States, South America and Cuba, with Maria Tallchief continuing as artistic advisor and Kenneth von Heidecke as artistic director. The organization is supported by the Illinois Arts Council.

Annual traditions include the company's production of Tchaikovsky's The Nutcracker in multiple theaters in Chicago, including the Rialto Square Theatre, Harris Theater in Millennium Park, and the McAninch Arts Center at College of DuPage. Springtime brings the company's presentation of Prokofiev's Cinderella. Each year, the company takes both productions on tour to different cities throughout the United States.

== School of Ballet ==
Sister to the Chicago Festival Ballet Company is the Von Heidecke School of Ballet, with a studio in Naperville. Under the direction of von Heidecke, the school provides professional instruction in the Russian Vaganova method and Balanchine method, with curriculum designed for students wishing to pursue a professional career in dance. In 2000, the school was named one of the top four ballet schools in the Chicago metro area by Dance Spirit Magazine.

== See also ==
- Atlanta Festival Ballet
