= Milen Nachev =

Bulgarian orchestral conductor (born 1957)

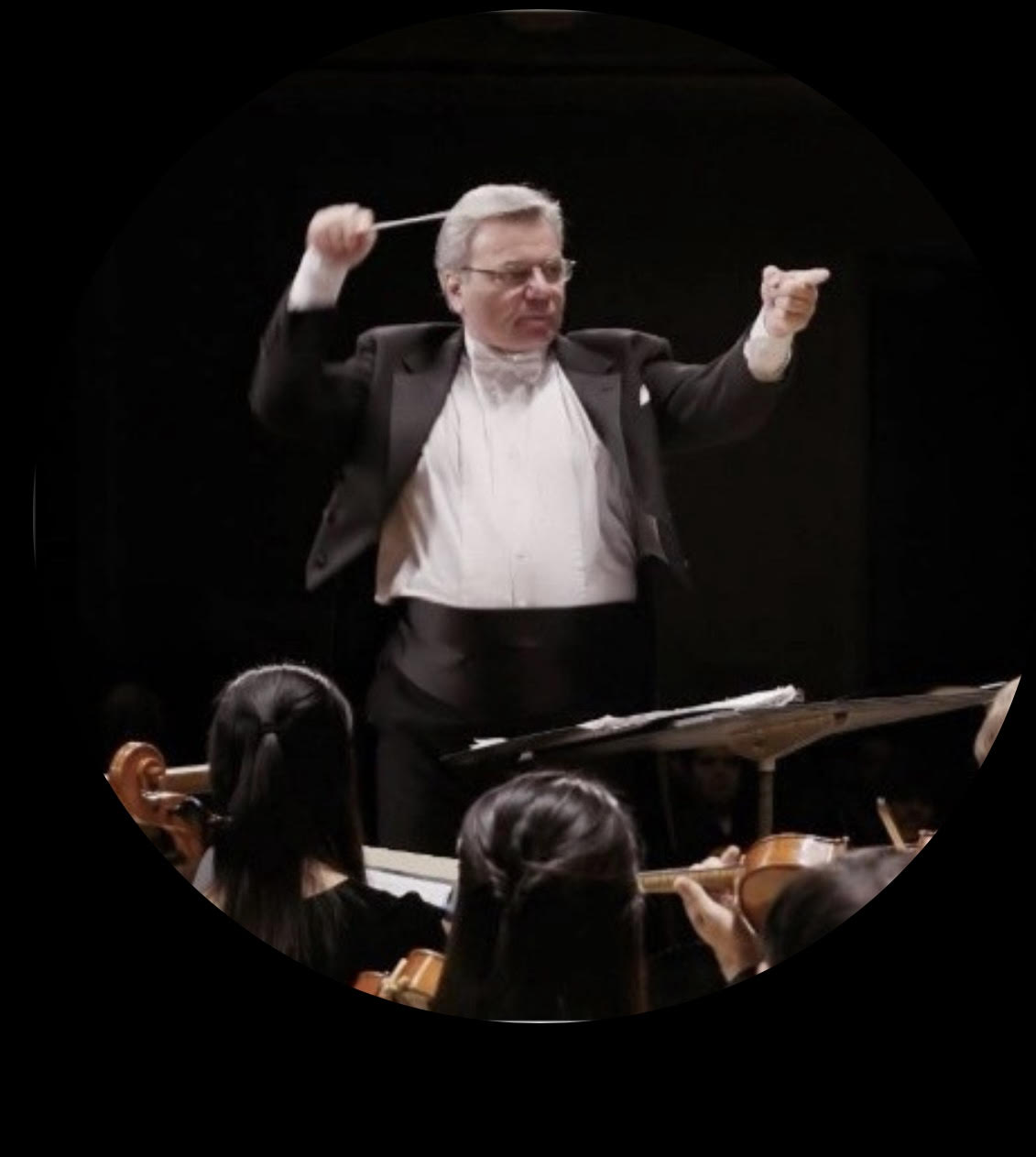
- Nachev conducting the Shen Yun Symphony Orchestra
- Born: 1 October 1957 (age 69); Silistra, Bulgaria
- Occupation: Orchestra Conductor

Milen Nachev (Bulgarian: Милен Начев; born 1 October 1957) is a Bulgarian orchestral conductor.

== Biography ==
Milen Nachev was born into an artistic family in Silistra, Bulgaria on 1 October 1957. At the age of five he made his debut as a pianist. Milen was accepted into the Bulgarian State Conservatory as a conductor and pianist, and was offered for a full scholarship to attend the Saint Petersburg Conservatory in Russia. There, he studied with Ilya Musin and received his master's degree in symphonic and opera conducting. Nachev participated in conducting master classes with Gennady Rozhdestvensky at Academia Musicale Chigiana in Sienna, Italy as well. He completed his graduate studies in 1992 with a music director internship at the Orchestra of Paris.

In 1989, Nachev was appointed principal conductor and director of the Rousse State Opera Theatre in Bulgaria. Following that, he was invited as a conductor of Sofia National Opera and Ballet Theatre as well.

Nachev has served as principal conductor of the Bulgarian National Radio Symphony Orchestra for eight years, and principal guest conductor of the Romanian National Radio Symphony Orchestra. He has also served as music director and conductor of Belgrade Radio & Television Symphony Orchestra, artistic director of International Symphonic & Opera Workshops, Ltd., and music director and principal conductor of the Balkan Philharmonic Orchestra. In 2011, he was invited as an artistic director and faculty professor of International Symphonic Masterclass with Peter the Great Music Academy in Saint Petersburg, Russia.

In 2012, Nachev was appointed as a conductor of Shen Yun Performing Arts – a company based in New York. He has conducted performances of Shen Yun Performing Arts dance program tours in the North and South America, Europe, Asia, New Zealand, and Australia.

During the Vatican Millennium Festival in Rome, Nachev was invited to conduct J.S. Bach’s Mass in B minor. In addition, Nachev went on to lead the Bulgarian National Radio Symphony Orchestra in the opening concert of the EUROPALIA Festival in Brussels, Belgium in 2002.

Nachev’s guest-conducting engagements have included appearances with, among others, the Saint Petersburg Philharmonic and St. Petersburg Academic Symphony Orchestra, Russia; Teatro Colón, Buenos Aires, Argentina; Romanian National Radio Symphony, Bucharest; Toronto Philharmonia, Canada; Bogotá National Symphony Orchestra, Columbia; Sofia Philharmonic, Bulgaria; Estonian National Symphony Orchestra, Tallinn; Karlovy Vary Philharmonic, Czech Republic; Rousse State Opera Theatre, Bulgaria, and Buenos Aires Philharmonic Orchestra, Argentina.

Nachev led the premiere performances of Giuseppe Verdi’s Don Carlos at Teatro Colón in Buenos Aires, including soloists from Teatro alla Scala di Milano and Bolshoi Theatre. In addition, he conducted the Eastern European premiere of Leonard Bernstein’s Candide with the Sofia National Opera.

Nachev has been honored with awards for Outstanding Musical Leadership by the City of Vatican in Rome, Foundation Napoleon in Paris, and the Bulgarian Ministry of the Culture. In addition, he received a Charter of Gratitude and Recognition from the Bulgarian Parliament.

== Recordings ==
In December 2002, EMI/Virgin released the compact disc Mozart in Egypt, which was conducted by Nachev.
