= Atlanta Festival Ballet =

Ballet company in Georgia, US

The Atlanta Festival Ballet Company is composed of ten professional dancers and student apprentices who have dedicated themselves to the discipline of dance performance. The Company began as the vision of Co-Artistic Director Gregory Aaron, and made its debut on November 4, 1989, in a full length performance of Cinderella. In 1994, the Company welcomed Nicolas Pacaña as Co-Artistic Director. Gregory Aaron does the choreography.

The Company hosts two major ballet productions a year, including its classic version of The Nutcracker.

== Atlanta Festival Ballet School ==
The Atlanta Festival ballet Company also hosts its own school, the Atlanta Festival Ballet School. Many students from the Atlanta Festival school have been accepted to ballet programs with the American Ballet Theatre, Hartford Ballet, San Francisco Ballet, Houston Ballet, Sacramento Ballet, and Joffrey Ballet. Students have been recipients of scholarships to Boston Ballet, The School of American Ballet, The Rock School, Southern Methodist University, and many other prestigious classical ballet training schools and companies.

== See also ==
- Chicago Festival Ballet
