= Mystic Ballet =

Coordinates: 41°21′49″N 71°56′20″W

Mystic Ballet – Mystic Dark Room Theatre at 325 Mistuxet Avenue Stonington CT.

Mystic Ballet is a modern dance company based in Mystic, Connecticut, founded in 1997 by Goran Subotic.

== History ==
Mystic Ballet began in 1997 as a small group of students.

With support from the National Endowment of the Arts, Connecticut Office of the Arts, and Connecticut Commission on Culture and Tourism, the company has toured regionally in Connecticut, New York, Massachusetts, and internationally to Germany, Japan, Serbia, Brazil, and Nicaragua.

In 2012, Mystic Ballet commissioned Gabrielle Lamb to create work which performed in collaboration with Gabrielle Lamb and Dancers and Mystic Ballet at Jacob's Pillow Dance Festival as part of its Inside Out Series. For the 2013 Jacob's Pillow Dance Festival - Inside Out Series, Mystic Ballet commissioned Laura Edson to create works Sun and Steel and Imaginary Love which performed by Mystic Ballet company dancers. The one work was performed by Laura Edson + Dancers Company. In the August 14, 2013 at Jacob's Pillow Dance Festival - Inside Out Series, Mystic Ballet performed Swan Lake.

On September 26, 2009 Mystic Ballet and Goran Subotic were publicly recognized by the State of Connecticut: “In recognition of the ongoing contribution to the cultural and artistic life of the region. The extraordinary talent and creative genius of Goran Subotic and the Mystic Ballet have brought a new dimension of beauty to our community and our state.”

In 2015 Mystic Ballet opened its performing venue in Mystic Dark Room in Stonington CT.

Mystic Ballet's performance programs and touring are supported by National Endowment for the Arts, Art Works, The Connecticut Office of the Arts, and The Connecticut Department of Economic and Community Development.
