= Cleveland Ballet (founded 1935) =

American ballet company

The Cleveland Ballet was founded in Cleveland in 1935 by Russian émigré Sergei Popeloff, a dancer associated with Anna Pavlova, and lasted until 1942. It was the first incarnation of the Cleveland Ballet, having been succeeded by ballet companies of the same name founded in 1972 and in 2014.
