= Savannah Ballet Theatre =

Ballet company in Georgia, USA

Savannah Ballet Theatre is a not-for-profit dance company in Savannah, Georgia, founded in 1998 as Savannah Danse Theatre by Suzanne Braddy.

Braddy founded the Islands Dance Academy on Wilmington Island, and has been teaching children from three years old to adult since 1988. Ten years later she started the Savannah Danse Theatre. The new company's first show was a full-length production of The Nutcracker. The company was renamed Savannah Ballet Theatre in 2013 with the Islands Dance Academy becoming the Savannah Ballet Theatre School of Dance.

The Nutcracker has since become known as The Nutcracker in Savannah. Every year the show features a special guest. Guests such as Paula Deen, Mary and Stratton Leopold, and Bobby Deen have appeared in the show. The company has also performed Sleeping Beauty, Swan Lake, The Little Mermaid, The Wizard of Oz and The Lion, The Witch, and The Wardrobe.

Auditions for the company are held in the fall.
