= Blitz campaign =

Short and intensive marketing campaign

In the world of marketing, a blitz campaign is a very short, intensive, and focused marketing campaign for a product or business. A blitz campaign is a marketing strategy designed to promote a product or a business quickly through the use of mass media; it is also called a "marketing blitz," a " time-based marketing campaign," and "intensive marketing." The idea behind a marketing blitz campaign is to have as many people see the business or product often in a short time. Typically, blitz campaigns are geared toward local business and not a more widespread audience. It can also be called a heavy-up.

Blitz campaigns use various mass media outlets, specifically the internet, to deliver information about a product or business quickly to a local audience. One of the most common ways to complete a blitz campaign is to use search engines. A blitz campaign will often utilize a lot from search engine marketing, including search engine optimization (SEO) and the use of contextual advertising. E-mail is another method of delivering product or business information during a blitz campaign.

Marketing blitz campaigns can also feature the use of print mediums such as brochures, newspaper ads, magazine features, and coupons.

== Advantages ==
Blitz campaigns help unknown businesses and products become better known to a specific audience through the use of persistent media exposure. Blitz campaigns can be used for seasonal content.

The time interval of a blitz campaign is also advantageous. A concentrated campaign for a short period of time means very fast, very direct results. Longer campaigns may drag out results and bore the intended audience.

== Disadvantages ==
A blitz campaign has several advantages but there are also some limitations to what such a marketing campaign can do. One of the advantages of the blitz campaign—that is so direct and local to an area—can also hinder its performance spread out further from the campaign’s heart.

== Successful marketing blitzes ==
In recent years, there have been several successful marketing blitzes, primarily from computer companies and video game companies. One such blitz came from Microsoft in 2009 for its Halo 3 game. Microsoft planned on using online, print, and television media to bring attention to the game. Another successful blitz comes from McDonald's for their McCafé coffee drinks. McDonald's used several media outlets and coupon booklets to promote their coffee beverages. Google also embarked on a marketing blitz for the Nexus One phone. This product had its own YouTube channel and was also present in Google web pages.
