= Anaheim Ballet =

Dance company based in Anaheim, California

General information
- Name: Anaheim Ballet
- Previous names: Coast Ballet Theater
- Year founded: 1985
- Website: www.anaheimballet.org

Senior staff
- Director: Lawrence Rosenberg and Sarma Lapenieks Rosenberg

Other
- Official school: Anaheim Ballet School
- Associated schools: Anaheim Ballet School Summer Intensive
- Formation: Principal; Soloist; Corps de Ballet

Anaheim Ballet is a dance company based in Anaheim, California.

== History ==
The company was founded in 1985 under the name Coast Ballet Theater. Anaheim Ballet was named the resident ballet company of the city by Anaheim's City Council in 1997.

As of 2012, the company is led by co-directors Lawrence Rosenberg and Sarma Lapenieks Rosenberg.

== Performances ==
Anaheim Ballet stages regular performances in Anaheim, and also performs extensively in Orange County, Los Angeles, and on tour regionally to Nevada and Arizona.

The Anaheim Ballet also presents the Anaheim International Dance Festival with Chapman University, in association with Youth America Grand Prix.

== Anaheim Ballet School ==
Anaheim Ballet offers classes for students ages 3–adults who are interested in pursuing a career in ballet, or merely looking for recreational training. The school stages an annual Spring Concert, and Anaheim Ballet annually performs the holiday ballet The Nutcracker. Students of Anaheim Ballet School have competed in the finals of the Youth America Grand Prix competition since its founding; the competition is the world's largest international student dance competition. Anaheim Ballet's summer student program draws students from Orange County and from abroad.

== "STEP-UP!" Community outreach program ==
In addition to regular performances and classes, Anaheim Ballet also runs an educational outreach program called STEP-UP!, that offers training to beginners as well as advanced students, with special no-cost accommodations made for under-privileged students.

== Professional alumni ==
- Aria Alekzander, Corps de Ballet, Houston Ballet
- Charles Andersen, Corps de Ballet, Royal Danish Ballet
- Alyssa Springer, Soloist, Houston Ballet

== See also ==
- List of ballet companies in the United States
- Glossary of ballet
- Anaheim
