= Concert Ballet of Virginia =

Concert Ballet of Virginia, a non-profit organization located in Hanover County near Richmond, Virginia, is a collection of amateur and professional dancers, choreographers, technicians, craft and stage people as well as volunteers organized to stage dance productions throughout Virginia.

Established February 2, 1976, the company began with a group of thirty dancers who split off from the Richmond Ballet once the original group decided to make their dance company entirely professional. Annually, the company presents a full season of performances from a repertory that includes classical and contemporary dance pieces, in addition to an annual full-length production of the Nutcracker Ballet.
