= Cleveland Ballet (founded 2014) =

Ballet company in Ohio, United States

General information
- Name: Cleveland Ballet
- Predecessor: Cleveland Ballet (founded 1972)
- Year founded: 2014
- Founders: Gladisa Guadalupe; Michael Krasnyansky
- Founding artistic director: Gladisa Guadalupe
- Principal venue: Playhouse Square, Cleveland, Ohio
- Website: cleveballet.org

Senior staff
- Chief executive: Larry Goodman

Artistic staff
- Artistic director: Timour Bourtasenkov

Other
- Official school: The Academy of Cleveland Ballet

Cleveland Ballet was founded in Cleveland in 2014 by Gladisa Guadalupe and Michael Krasnyansky. It is the third incarnation of a Cleveland Ballet, having been preceded by establishments of the same name founded in 1935 and 1972.

The company has grown from 5 to 26 dancers from 11 countries and territories over its initial 5 seasons, and as of 2019 was one of the fastest growing professional ballet companies in the U.S. In 2017, it became a resident company of Playhouse Square.

== History and growth ==
This incarnation of the Cleveland Ballet was founded by Gladisa Guadalupe (then artistic director) and her husband, Michael Krasnyansky (then CEO). Guadalupe is an alumna of the School of American Ballet and a former principal dancer, and Krasnyansky is a Ukrainian American businessman. In October 2015, Cleveland Ballet's inaugural season debuted with the ballet Past. Present. Future. at Playhouse Square, characterized by The Plain Dealer as a "stylistically diverse and entertaining" production. The company continued with a production of Coppélia in May 2016, described as "evidence of a company eager and able to do great things", with the dancers' performances as "mostly excellent".

By its second season, 2016–2017, the ballet had grown to fourteen members. It concluded the season with a performance of A Midsummer Night's Dream, which was reviewed as featuring "smartly-crafted, deceptively difficult, and wonderfully illustrative choreography".

Cleveland Ballet became Playhouse Square's resident classical ballet company in 2017, during its third season. This designation resulted in additional marketing funds, access to more rehearsal space, and priority in scheduling.

In 2017, Cleveland Ballet also reintroduced regular holiday performances of Tchaikovsky's ballet, The Nutcracker, as a seasonal tradition in Cleveland—the first Nutcracker production by a local company at Playhouse Square since 1999. Additional performances of the season included the 1909 ballet, Les Sylphides, as well as Alice, a new ballet based on Lewis Carroll's book Alice in Wonderland.

In the fourth season, 2018–2019, the company increased to 20 professional dancers. In addition to The Nutcracker, Cleveland Ballet presented Fall Collection and Coppélia as main stage productions at Playhouse Square.

In its fifth season, 2019–2020, the ballet grew to 25 dancers, performing Carmen at the Ohio Theatre in October and offering 12 performances of The Nutcracker at the Hanna Theatre in December. The season was cut short by the COVID-19 pandemic in spring 2020, requiring the cancellation of the company's planned performance of Mozart's The Magic Flute.

Gladisa Guadalupe and Michael Krasnyansky were suspended in November 2023 following “serious workplace allegations” made by employees to the Ballet's Board of Directors. A week later, Michael Krasnyansky resigned.

In early January 2024, the Cleveland Ballet ceased its affiliation with the Cleveland School of Dance which was started by then-artistic director Guadalupe. An additional investigation ordered by the Board of Directors found Guadalupe and Krasnyansky to have committed financial improprieties, practiced nepotism in personnel matters, and committed sexual harassment. Guadalupe was fired from her position of Artistic Director on January 10, 2024. Guadalupe and Krasnyansky have denied the allegations.

In January 2024, the Cleveland Ballet Board of Directors appointed Timour Bourtasenkov as new Artistic Director. In April 2024, the Cleveland Ballet Board of Directors Appointed Larry Goodman President and Chief Executive Officer.
