= Cleveland Ballet =

American ballet company

The Cleveland Ballet was founded in Cleveland in 1972 by Dennis Nahat and Ian Horvath as a dance school, the School of Cleveland Ballet. It was the second incarnation of the Cleveland Ballet, having been preceded a ballet company of the same name founded in 1935 and succeeded by another founded in 2014.

Nahat and Horvath subsequently recruited professional dancers who by 1975 were previewing performances around Cleveland. The company first performed at the Hanna Theatre November 19, 1976. A year later the Ohio Chamber Orchestra began providing live music and in 1978 the company presented its first original full-length ballet, “The Gift” in 1976 The Nutcracker in 1979, Coppelia, Romeo and Juliet and Swan Lake were next added to the repertory. In 1984 Horvath resigned, leaving Nahat solely responsible for the company and school. That year the ballet moved to the newly renovated State Theater in Playhouse Square where Nahat created another full evening ballet Celebrations and Ode music from Ludwig van Beethoven full 7th and 9th symphonies.

From 1985 to 2000 it continued as the Cleveland San Jose Ballet, performing in both Cleveland and San Jose, California. By 1990 it was the fourth-largest ballet company in the United States, and the largest one that was a co-venture between two cities. In 2000, the founding Cleveland base of operations then led by Board President, Robert G. Jones of Key Bank, closed the company and the ballet began operating based exclusively in San Jose. In 2004 John Fry of Fry's Electronics joined the board with a contribution on 1 million dollars and the company was subsequently taken over by new board chair, John Fry. In a letter instructed by Fry, Nahat was ousted in January 2011 by newly Fry appointed Executive Director, Stephanie Ziesel. After a year, the name was changed to Silicon Valley Ballet until its final closure in 2016.
