= Chicago Artists' Coalition =

US non-profit organization

Chicago Artists Coalition is a non-profit artist service organization based in Chicago.

== History ==
The Chicago Artists Coalition was founded in 1974 by a group of artists. It was modeled after the Boston Visual Artists' Union, Inc. and officially incorporated in 1975. Historically, the organization has played an important role in artists' professional development and local/regional advocacy. It was instrumental in the establishment of the Chicago Department of Cultural Affairs (now the Department of Cultural Affairs & Special Events); proved vital in advocating for the Percent for Art bill, and was involved in the creation of Arts Alliance Illinois, the state advocacy organization.

The Coalition organised the first Chicago Artists Month, which ran in November 1995. They ran the event annually until the Chicago Department of Cultural Affairs took over, moving the event to October.

Since 2010, the Coalition began to grow significantly in its programming and operations, guided by strategic planning initiatives and multi-year capacity-building grants. In 2011, the Coalition relocated to the West Loop neighborhood in downtown Chicago, which is home to many of the city's top contemporary arts galleries and artist-run spaces. The organization currently operates in an 8,000 square foot historic building that contains a lofty gallery/program space, artist residency studios, and administrative offices. In 2012, the Coalition acquired the Chicago Artists Resource website, known as CAR, which expanded the organization's services and outreach to artists working in multiple disciplines.

== Programs ==
The Chicago Artists Coalition's core programs provide educational training, exhibition/residency initiatives and marketplace building for artists and a diverse arts public.
