= Dance in the United States =

Dance in the United States
AK, AL, AR, AS, AZ, CA, CO, CT, DC, DE
FL, GA, GU, HI, IA, ID, IL, IN, KS, KY, LA
MA, MD, ME, MI, MN, MO, MP, MS, MT
NC, ND, NE, NH, NM, NV, NJ, NY, OH
OK, OR, PA, PR, RI, SC, SD, TN, TX, UT
VA, VI, VT, WA, WI, WV, WY

The United States of America is the home of the hip hop dance, swing, tap dance and its derivative Rock and Roll, and modern square dance (associated with the United States of America due to its historic development in that country—twenty three U.S. states have designated it as their official state dance or official folk dance) and one of the major centers for modern dance. There is a variety of social dance and performance or concert dance forms with also a range of traditions of Native American dances.

The reality shows and competitions So You Think You Can Dance, America's Best Dance Crew, and Dancing with the Stars, have broadened the audience for dance.

== African American dance ==
African American dances are those vernacular dances which have developed within African American communities in everyday spaces, rather than in dance studios, schools or companies. African American vernacular dances are usually centered on social dance practice, though performance dance and concert dance often supply complementary aspects to social dancing.

Placing great value on improvisation, African American vernacular dances are characterized by ongoing change and development. Because they exist in social spaces and their main 'purpose' is self-expression, they are continually changing to reflect the needs, interests and personalities of their participants.

Alvin Ailey and the Alvin Ailey American Dance Theater is an important example of African American involvement in performance or concert dance.

== Swing dance ==
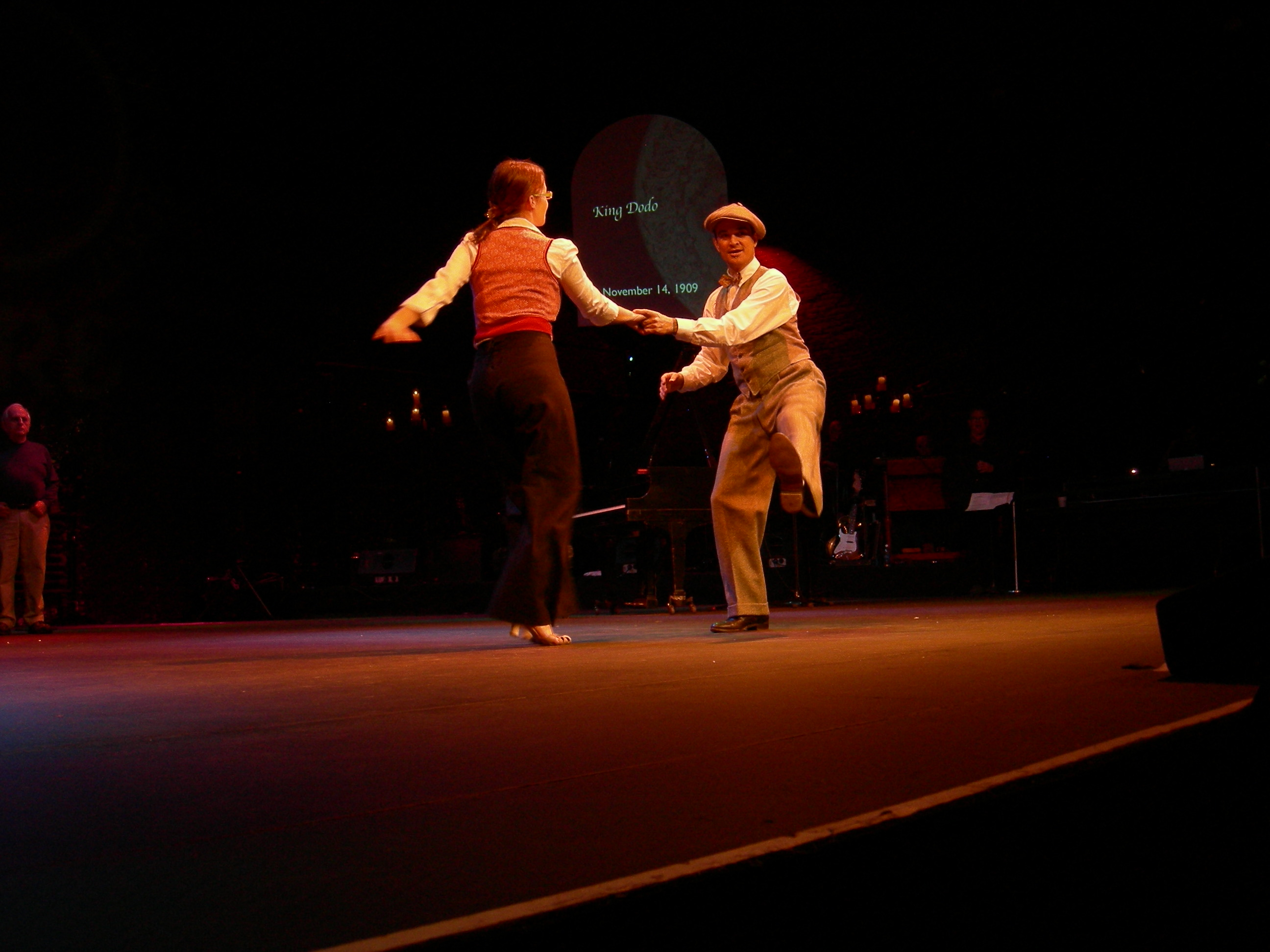
Mia Goldsmith and Peter Loggins swing dancing at the 100th anniversary of the Moore Theatre (Seattle, Washington), 2007.

The term "swing dance" refers to a group of dances that developed concurrently with jazz music in the 1920s, 30s and 40s. The most iconic among the various styles of swing dance is the Lindy Hop, which originated in Harlem and is still danced today. While the majority of swing dances began in African-American communities as vernacular African-American dances, some forms, like Balboa, developed within Euro-American or other ethnic group communities.

Dances such as the Black Bottom, Charleston, Shag, and Tap Dance travelled north with Dixieland jazz to New York, Kansas City, and Chicago in the Great Migration (African American) of the 1920s, where rural blacks travelled to escape persecution, Jim Crow laws, lynching and unemployment in the South (during the Great Depression).

Swinging jazz music features the syncopated timing associated with African American and West African music and dance—a combination of crotchets and quavers which many swing dancers interpret as 'triple steps' and 'steps' — yet also introduces changes in the way these rhythms were played—a distinct delay or 'relaxed' approach to timing.

Swing dance is now found globally, with great variety in their preferences for particular dances.

== Modern dance ==
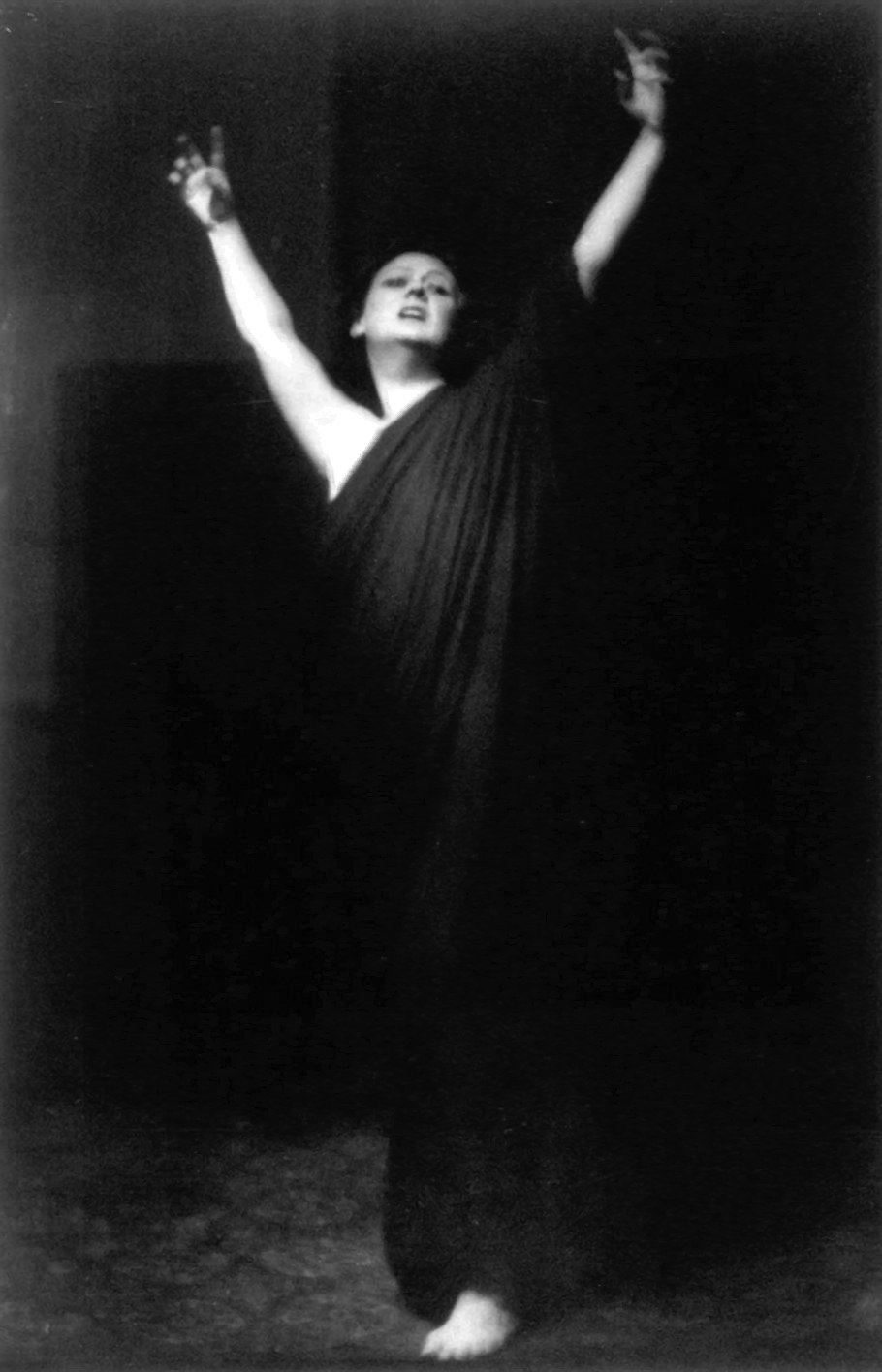
Isadora Duncan

American modern dance developed in the early 20th century alongside American music. Among the pioneers of modern dance were Isadora Duncan, the dance company of Ruth St. Denis and her husband-partner, Ted Shawn, and their pupils Doris Humphrey and Martha Graham. The early modern dance makers broke with European classical forms by giving into the weight of gravity, initiating movement from the center rather than the limbs, and emphasizing an emotional directness in their choreography. Many of Graham's most popular works were produced in collaboration with leading American composers -- "Appalachian Spring" with Aaron Copland, for example.

Later choreographers, Merce Cunningham introduced chance procedures and composition by field, and Alvin Ailey incorporated African dance elements and black music into his works. Recently, Mark Morris and Liz Lerman have shown that graceful, exciting movement is not restricted by age or body type.

== Dance and society ==
Dance is ingrained in society through events, the media, and awards like the Grammy Awards, the Golden Globes, and the MTV video music awards which feature dancing.

Some popular competition televised events that are made for dance are Dancing with the Stars, So You Think You Can Dance and America's Best Dance Crew. These dancing shows allow society to interact with them, choosing who they think suits best in the competition.

Popular songs like Michael Jackson's "Thriller", The Harlem Shake, and "Teach me how to dougie" have influenced dance moves that became trends in society. In social gatherings people may dance folk dances, ballroom dances, casual dances, or modern dances like hip-hop.

== American folk dances ==
Contra dancing in Vermont in 2019

- Cajun Jig
- Cajun Jitterbug
- Contra dance
- Clogging
- English Country Dance
- Square dance
- Virginia Reel (dance)
- Zydeco (dance)

== Other American dances ==
- Bomba
- Boogaloo
- Breakdancing
- Broadway dance
- Cakewalk
- Charleston
- Country/Western Two-step
- Country/western dance
- Crip Walk
- Harlem Shake
- House dance
- Hula
- Hustle
- Jazz dance
- Jive
- Modern western square dance
- Moonwalk
- Perreo
- Plena
- Rock and roll
- Rumba
- Salsa
- Turkey Trot
- Twerking
- Urban dance
- Waacking

== Noted dancers ==
- Fred Astaire
- Isadora Duncan
- Suzanne Farrell
- Bob Fosse
- Savion Glover
- Martha Graham
- Gregory Hines
- Hunter Johnson
- Michael Jackson
- Gene Kelly
- Marilyn Miller
- Nicholas Brothers
- Donald O'Connor
- Sono Osato
- Jonathan Roberts
- Ginger Rogers
- Ariella Rush
- Eddie Torres
- Edward Villella
- Mr. Wiggles
- Misty Copeland

== Companies ==
=== Ballet companies ===
- Allen Civic Ballet
- Alameda Civic Ballet
- American Ballet Theatre
- American Ballet
- Anaheim Ballet
- Aspen Santa Fe
- Ballet Met
- Ballet Nouveau
- Ballet San Jose
- Ballet West
- Boston Ballet
- Carolina Ballet
- Chicago Festival Ballet
- Cincinnati Ballet
- Colorado Ballet
- Dayton Ballet
- Houston Ballet
- Joffrey Ballet
- Kansas City Ballet
- Los Angeles Ballet
- Miami City Ballet
- Nevada Ballet Theatre
- New York City Ballet
- New York City Center
- New York Theatre Ballet
- Pacific Northwest Ballet
- Oregon Ballet Theatre
- San Francisco Ballet
- The Sacramento Ballet
- The Washington Ballet
- Tulsa Ballet

==== Other companies ====
- Alvin Ailey American Dance Theater
- American Indian Dance Theatre
- Bill T. Jones/Arnie Zane Dance Company
- Paul Taylor Dance Company
- Nevada Ballet Theatre
- Dance Box Theater
- Chicago Dance Crash
- Dance Theater Workshop
- Judson Dance Theater
- Ririe-Woodbury Dance Company
- José Limón Dance Company
- Pilobolus Dance Theater
- Martha Graham Dance Company
- Cedar Lake Contemporary Ballet
- Hubbard Street Dance Chicago
- Lar Lubovitch Dance Company
- Mark Morris Dance Group
- Trisha Brown Dance Company
- Shen Wei Dance Arts
- The Rockettes
- Snappy Dance Theater
- Rock Steady Crew
- Duquesne University Tamburitzans
- Ice Theatre of New York
- Columbia City Jazz Dance Company
- Dance Theatre of Harlem
- Nimbus Dance Works

=== Former dance companies ===
- Merce Cunningham Dance Company

== Dance education ==
- The Juilliard School
- National Dance Education Organization
- The Conservatory of Dance

== Festivals ==
- American Dance Festival
- Jacob's Pillow is a home for dance in the United States founded by Ted Shawn and Ruth St. Denis, were America's leading dance couple. It is a National Historic Landmark located in the town of Becket, Massachusetts, in the Berkshires. It encompasses an internationally acclaimed summer dance festival (the first and longest-running in the United States), a professional school, rare and extensive archives, an intern program, and year-round community programs.
- Fall for Dance Festival
- DanceAfrica

== See also ==
- Modern dance in the United States
- National Museum of Dance and Hall of Fame
- Performing arts presenters
- List of U.S. state dances
