= Dance in California =

Aspect of Californian culture

California is rich in dance history. In classical ballet, California is home to the oldest professional ballet company in the United States. The San Francisco Ballet, founded as the San Francisco Opera Ballet in 1933, predates both American Ballet Theatre and New York City Ballet. Barbara Crockett founded the Sacramento Ballet in 1954 and hosted the first festival for the Pacific Western Region of Regional Dance America in 1966. In modern dance, Ruth St. Denis established her second school in the Hollywood area of Los Angeles in 1940 while Lester Horton created the Horton Dance Group in 1934, also in Los Angeles. Ann Halprin founded the San Francisco Dancers’ Workshop in 1950 and continues to live and work in the San Francisco Bay Area. The Bay Area in also home to Alonzo King's Lines Ballet and Oberlin Dance Collective.

Dance in the United States
AK, AL, AR, AS, AZ, CA, CO, CT, DC, DE
FL, GA, GU, HI, IA, ID, IL, IN, KS, KY, LA
MA, MD, ME, MI, MN, MO, MP, MS, MT
NC, ND, NE, NH, NM, NV, NJ, NY, OH
OK, OR, PA, PR, RI, SC, SD, TN, TX, UT
VA, VI, VT, WA, WI, WV, WY

== Timeline ==
=== 1910-1920 ===
- Denishawn School of Dancing and Related Arts Founded (1915)
- Martha Graham attends Denishawn School

=== 1920-1930 ===
- San Francisco War Memorial Opera House Opens (1932)

=== 1930-1940 ===
- San Francisco Opera Ballet (1933)

=== 1940-1950 ===
- Horton Dance Group (1934)

=== 1950-1960 ===
- San Francisco Dancers' Workshop (1950)
- Sacramento Ballet (1954)

=== 1960-1970 ===
- Dorothy Chandler Pavilion (1954)

=== 1970-1980 ===
- Oberlin Dance Collective

=== 1980-1990 ===
- Lines Ballet (1982)

== Company Listing ==
=== Professional Ballet Companies ===
==== San Francisco ====
- San Francisco Ballet
- Lines Ballet
- Smuin Ballet

==== Greater Bay Area ====
- Ballet San Jose Silicon Valley
- Oakland Ballet
- Company C Contemporary Ballet

==== North San Joaquin Valley ====
- The Sacramento Ballet
- Folsom Lake Civic Ballet

==== Northern Sierra Foothills ====
- Placer Theatre Ballet

=== Professional Modern/Contemporary Companies ===
==== San Francisco ====
- ODC
- Robert Moses's Kin

==== North San Joaquin Valley ====
- Core Contemporary Dance

==== Los Angeles ====
- HomeLA

== Schools ==
=== Ballet/Dance Schools ===
==== Northern California ====
- San Francisco Ballet School
- The School (Sacramento Ballet)
- Marin Ballet

==== Southern California ====
- Coburn School

== RDA (Regional Dance America) Members ==
- Crockett-Deane Ballet
- Dance Connection Ballet Company
- Juline Regional Youth Ballet
- Long Beach Ballet
- Maple Youth Ballet
- Marin Ballet
- Paso Robles Chamber Ballet
- North Coast Ballet California
- Sacramento Ballet Youth Ensemble
- Santa Barbara Festival Ballet
- Santa Cruz Ballet Theatre
- South Bay Ballet
- State Street Ballet Young Dancers

== Degree Programs ==
| | BA | BFA | MFA | PHD |
|---|---|---|---|---|
| Mills College | √ | √ | √ | |
| UC Irvine | √ | √* | √ | |
| UCLA | √ | | √ | √* |

*BFA in Choreography/Performance

== Native Dancers ==
- Isadora Duncan
- Maia Wilkins
- Jodie Gates
- Sascha Radetsky

== External Resources ==
- http://www.dancehistoryproject.org/article/articles/chronologies/ballet-chronologies/
