= Tessa Earl =

American ballerina

Tessa Earl (born in 1982 or 1983) is a ballet dancer who has performed as company dancer for many Christian dance companies including Ballet Rejoice and the United States' most well-known Christian dance company, Ballet Magnificat!.

A graduate of Bear River High School (class of 2002), Earl founded the dance studio The Conservatory of Dance in Rocklin, California, which is the official dance studio for the Placer Theatre Ballet. She sold the studio after her marriage in 2007.

== Dance companies ==
- Placer Theatre Ballet
- Ballet Magnificat!
- Marin Dance Theatre
- Sacramento Ballet
