= Donald McKayle =

American dancer and teacher (1930–2018)

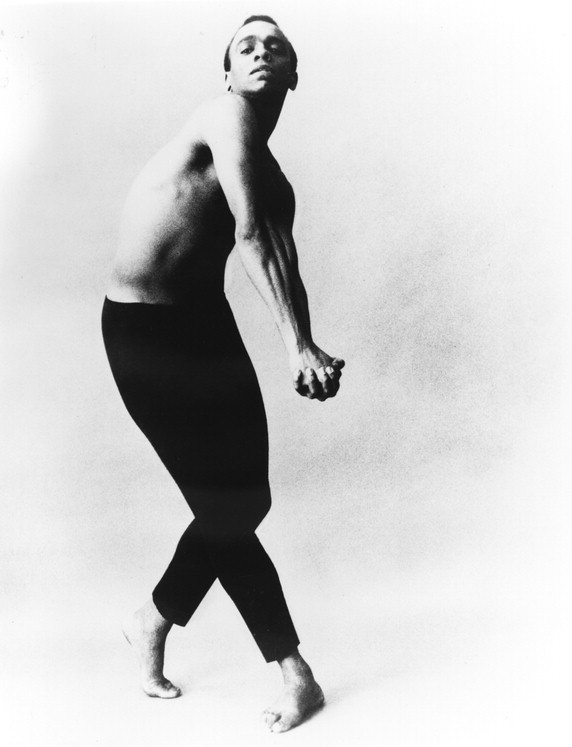
- McKayle in 1963, courtesy of the Jerome Robbins Dance Division, New York Public Library for the Performing Arts
- Born: July 6, 1930; New York City, United States
- Died: April 6, 2018 (aged 87)
- Occupations: Modern dancer, choreographer, teacher, director, writer
- Years active: 1948–2018

Donald McKayle (July 6, 1930 – April 6, 2018) was an American modern dancer, choreographer, teacher, director and writer best known for creating socially conscious concert works during the 1950s and '60s that focus on expressing the human condition and, more specifically, the black experience in America. He was "among the first black men to break the racial barrier by means of modern dance." His work for the concert stage, especially Games (1951) and Rainbow Round My Shoulder (1959), has been the recipient of widespread acclaim and critical attention.

In addition, McKayle was the first black man to both direct and choreograph major Broadway musicals, including the Tony Award-winners Raisin (1973) and Sophisticated Ladies (1981), and he worked extensively in television and film. As a young man he appeared with some of the twentieth century's most important choreographers, including Martha Graham, Anna Sokolow, and Merce Cunningham, and in some of Broadway's landmark productions, including House of Flowers (1958) and West Side Story (1957), where he served for a time as the production's dance captain. A Tony Award and Emmy Award nominee, McKayle held an endowed chair for the last decades of his life in the Dance Department at UC Irvine, where he was the Claire Trevor Professor of Dance. He previously served on the faculties of Connecticut College, Sarah Lawrence College, and Bennington College.

== Early life and influences ==
McKayle was born in New York City on July 6, 1930, and grew up in a racially mixed East Harlem community of African-American, Puerto Rican, and Jewish immigrants. He was the second child of a middle-class, immigrant family of Jamaican descent. His father worked as a maintenance man at the Copacabana nightclub before becoming a mechanic while his mother worked as a medical assistant.

Growing up in an integrated neighborhood shaped McKayle's understanding of the social issues and racial prejudices in America during a time when racism and segregation was commonplace. McKayle was also influenced by his parents' liberal and activist lifestyles. He was exposed to social dance and the exuberant social atmosphere of the West Indian parties his parents attended. McKayle's educational experience attending a public school outside of the Harlem community also heightened his social awareness. His political beliefs were influenced by his high-school English teacher Lewis Allen, also known as Abel Meeropol, author of the poem "Strange Fruit", and in high school McKayle joined the Frederick Douglass Society to learn more about African-American history and heritage, a subject that was not taught in school.

But it was an inspiring performance by Pearl Primus that sparked McKayle's interest in dance as a teenager. Despite his lack of formal dance training, he auditioned and was granted a scholarship for the New Dance Group in 1947. McKayle was ambitious and eagerly took advantage of the company's formal training in modern, ballet, tap, Afro-Caribbean, Hindu, and Haitian dance forms. His instructors included modern dance pioneer Martha Graham, Merce Cunningham, Anna Sokolow and Karol Shook. His noted mentors are Sophie Maslow, Jane Dudley, William Bales, and his first teacher Jean Erdman. Other instructors include Mary Anthony, Pearl Primus, Jean-Leon Destine, Hadassah, and Paul Draper. In less than a year, McKayle was choreographing his own complete concert dance pieces.

== Early choreography ==
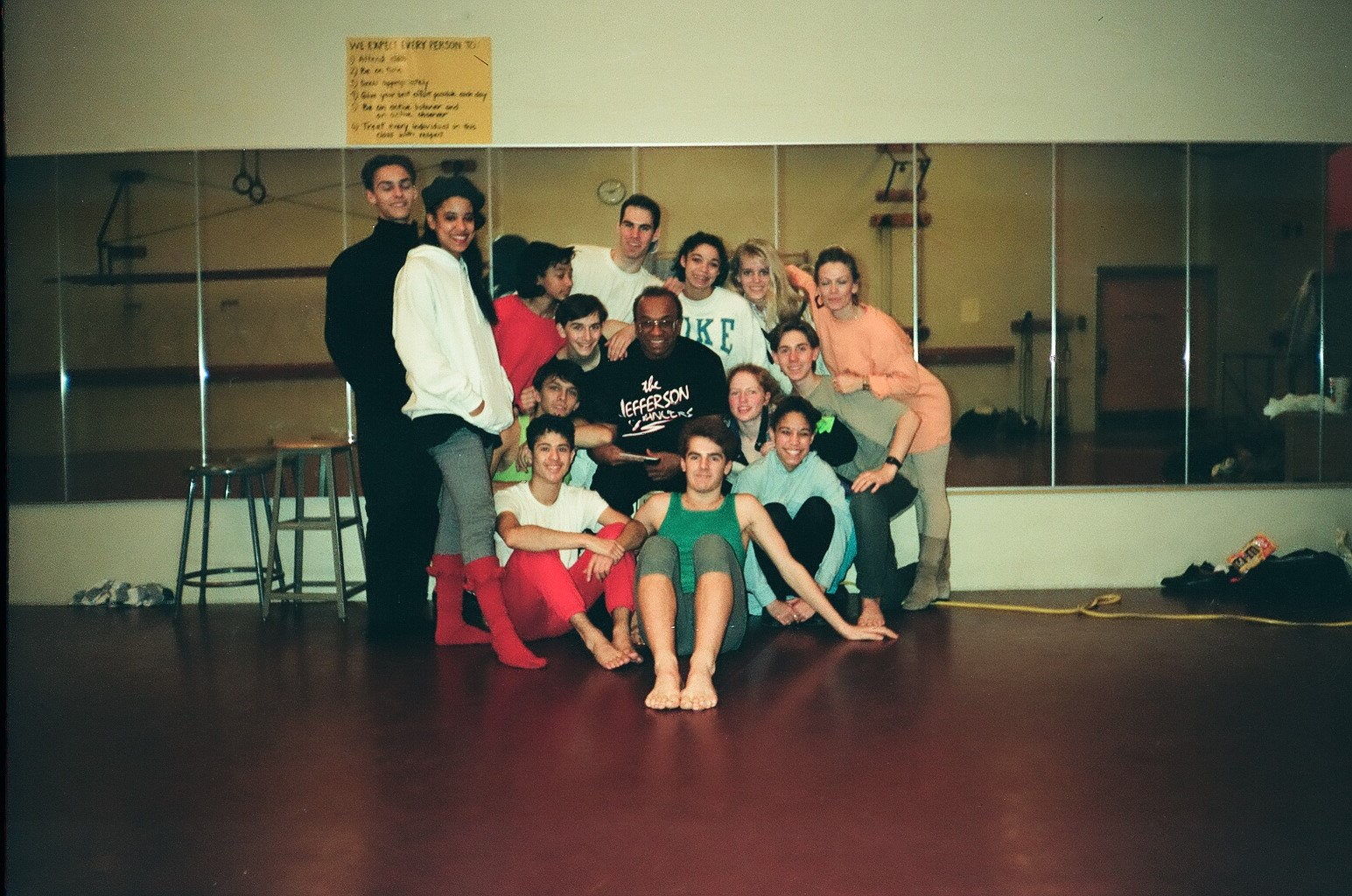
McKayle with the Jefferson Dancers, 1992

McKayle's early works explores the universal human condition and reflect themes of unity and community through expressive and emotional movement.

At the age of 18 McKayle premiered his solo piece, Saturday's Child (1948), choreographed to the poetry of Countee Cullen. This piece depicted the reality of poverty and the suffering of the homeless. According to McKayle's autobiography, he was inducted into the Committee for the Negro in the Arts due to the repeated performance and high visibility of this piece. This organization was composed of Harlem Renaissance, leaders including Langston Hughes, and up-and-coming African-American artists and performers such as Harry Belafonte. The Committee was dedicated to changing the prejudices and widespread racism that made it difficult for African Americans in the performing arts.

The American dance classic Games (1951) was McKayle's first major work and was responsible for launching his dance career. He combines rhythms, chants, play songs and street games to create a childhood scene dedicated solely to playtime. Inspired by childhood memories, Games explores themes of poverty and discrimination in shaping the lives and attitudes of the youth.

Rainbow 'Round My Shoulder (1959) is also considered a masterwork that incorporates Africanist movement, rhythms, and music. Prisoners of a chain gang move powerfully across the stage creating an expressive narrative through abstract movements of physical labor. McKayle alludes to African-American dreams of freedom and equality through this image of bondage and slavery. The racial injustice and violence of the piece concludes as a chain gang member is shot and killed.

== Broadway/ TV/ Film ==
McKayle's early works attracted the interest of Broadway stars, audiences, and Hollywood films. Golden Boy (1964) was his first Broadway production, followed by I'm Solomon (1969) and Dr. Jazz (1975). McKayle was the director and choreographer of Raisin (1974) and was awarded a Tony for the best musical. He was responsible for the entire concept, staging and choreography of Sophisticated Ladies (1981), which has won numerous awards.

Creating choreography for celebrities led to his appearances in popular television shows such as The Bill Cosby Show and The Ed Sullivan Show. McKayle's work was broadcast on every major TV network from 1951 to 1985. He has also choreographed for films, including Bedknobs and Broomsticks (1970), The Great White Hope (1972), and The Minstrel Man (1976).

=== Biographical documentary film ===
Donald McKayle : Heartbeats of a Dancemaker Film by Joy Chong-Stannard; Victoria N Kneubuhl; Gregg Lizenbery; Marilyn Cristofori. Musical score by Stephen Fox. Appearances by Donald McKayle; Della Reese (narrator); Harry Belafonte; José Limón Dance Company; San Jose and Cleveland Ballet. Dance Pioneers; Hawaii Public Television; Dance Horizons Video.

== Awards ==
In 1963, McKayle was awarded the Capezio Dance Award, and in 1992 received the Samuel H. Scripps American Dance Festival Award for lifetime achievement. In 2004, he received the Heritage Award from the National dance association for his contributions to dance education. He was the first to receive the Distinguished Faculty Lectureship Award for Research from the University of California, Irvine where he was an instructor and the artistic director of UCI's dance troupe.

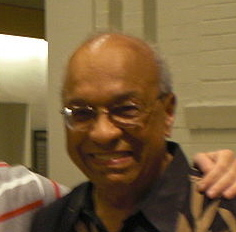
McKayle, 2008.

The 2016 Bessie for Outstanding Revival (The New York Dance and Performance Awards) was presented to Rainbow ’Round My Shoulder by Donald McKayle, performed by Dayton Contemporary Dance Company, and produced by Paul Taylor American Modern Dance at the David H. Koch Theater "for giving a classic modern dance powerful new life, transforming the midcentury portrayal of an African-American prison chain gang into a searingly resonant cry for our current times, performed with humanity, craft, and beauty."

== Companies ==
McKayle formed and directed his own dance company, Donald McKayle and Dancers (1951–69), and was the head of the Inner City Repertory Dance Company from 1970 to 1974. He maintained relationships with companies that are repositories of his work including the Alvin Ailey American Dance Theatre, the Cleveland San Jose Ballet, and the Los Angeles Contemporary Dance Theatre.

McKayle was a choreographer of the Limon Dance Company from 1995 onwards. He also choreographed more than 70 pieces for dance companies around the world in the U.S., Canada, Israel, Europe and South America.

== Selected choreography ==
- Saturday's Child (1948)(1960)
- Creole Afternoon (1950)
- Games (1951)
- Her Name was Harriet (1952)
- Nocturne (1953)
- The Street (1954)
- Prelude to Action (1954)
- Four Excursions (1956)
- Rainbow 'Round My Shoulder (1959)
- District Storyville (1962)
- Blood of the Lamb (1963)
- Reflections in the Park (1964)
- Incantation (1968)
- Songs of the disinherited
- Death and Eros (2000), with music composed for the dance by Jon Magnussen

== Broadway choreography credits ==
- Redhead, 1959 (Associate Choreographer)
- Golden Boy, 1964 (Tony Award nominee for Best Choreography)
- A Time for Singing, 1965
- I'm Solomon, 1968
- Raisin, 1973 (Tony Award nominee for Best Choreography and Best Direction)
- Doctor Jazz, 1975 (Tony Award nominee for Best Choreography)
- Sophisticated Ladies, 1981 (Tony Award nominee for Best Choreography)
- It Ain't Nothin' But the Blues, 1999

=== Roles ===
- House of Flowers (1954)
- West Side Story (1957)

== Selected film and television choreography ==
- Ed Sullivan Show (CBS, 1966/67)
- The Great White Hope (1970)
- Bedknobs and Broomsticks (1970)
- Charlie and the Angel (1972)
- The New Bill Cosby Show (1972)
- Free to Be... You and Me (1974)
- Minstrel Man (CBS, 1977)
- The Jazz Singer (1980)
