= Dance education =

Field of study of teaching dance

Dance Education is practice whereby students are taught a wide understanding or dance using art form and different genres of dance .

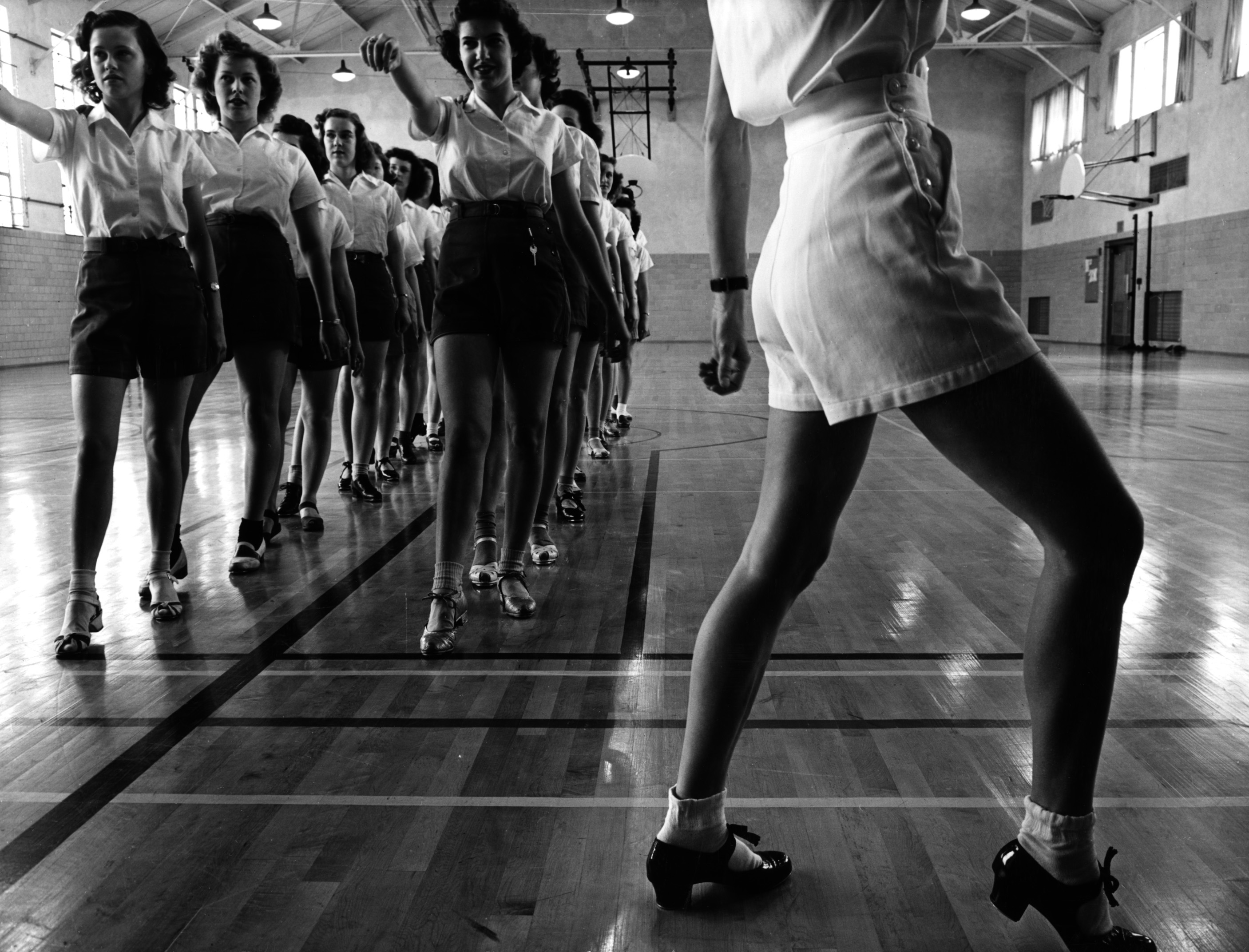
Tap dancing class at Iowa State University in 1942

Dance education is a practice whereby students are taught a broad understanding of dance as a form of art and who are trained professionally in many different genres of dance. Dance education consists of specialized dancers who conduct original research for teaching others how to dance. Currently, dance itself is considered an allied form of art and music, thus dance in formal education is closely knit with these disciplines.

== Curriculum ==
In general, a dance education curriculum is designed to impart the knowledge and skills of performing dance for the students. Knowledge-oriented curricula may cover any of a diverse range of topics, including dance notation, human anatomy, physics, dance history, cultural aspects of dance, and music.

A curriculum may involve the study of one or more dance genres, including formal genres such as ballet, ballroom, contemporary, jazz, Latin, tap, pointe, hip hop, jazz funk and informal and social genres such as line, freestyle, and sequence dancing.

== Professional dance education ==
Professional and vocational dance education is offered by both public and private institutions. Private institutions, which are commonly known as dance schools or dance colleges, are typically focused on dance education, whereas public institutions usually cover a broad range of topics. Examples of private institutions include the Royal Ballet School and the School of American Ballet, the Alvin Ailey American Dance Theater (now The Ailey School), The Juilliard School, and the Boston Conservatory at Berklee.

Many public and private universities and colleges offer minor programs in dance, or major programs with academic degrees such as Bachelor of Arts, Bachelor of Fine Arts, and Master of Fine Arts in dance. Some public secondary education institutions offer comprehensive dance education curricula. For example, Jefferson High School (Portland, Oregon) offers concentrated vocational dance education in conjunction with its pre-professional dance company, The Jefferson Dancers. In addition, some dance companies offer pre-professional, adult, community, adaptive dance training, and/or workshops, along with their company programs. Some examples include: the Joffrey Ballet (Chicago, Illinois), Hubbard Street Dance Chicago, Houston Ballet, the Boston Ballet, and San Francisco Ballet companies.

There are at least three categories of classes. Regular dance classes will generally go more than a few weeks. For younger students, many dance schools will follow the local school calendar. Majority of dance studios start the new season at the beginning of August and last until the beginning of June. This makes a typical dance season about 40 weeks long.

Dance workshops generally go from a day to a week, often in Summer, and offer a variety of dancers an opportunity to hone their skills.

Dance intensives are generally for higher-level dancers. They have a more focused lesson plan than workshops, and last between two weeks and a month.

== Self-teaching ==
One method for teaching oneself to dance is watching videos of one's favorite dancers and copying their moves. The choreographer Wade Robson learned to dance this way. One can learn moves from any other dancer. On can also film oneself dancing to better understand how different moves look, or solicit feedback from others.

Although one is able to self-teach dance moves, one should exercise caution to avoid injury from executing moves incorrectly. Learning proper form is vital to progress.

== Dance in formal education ==
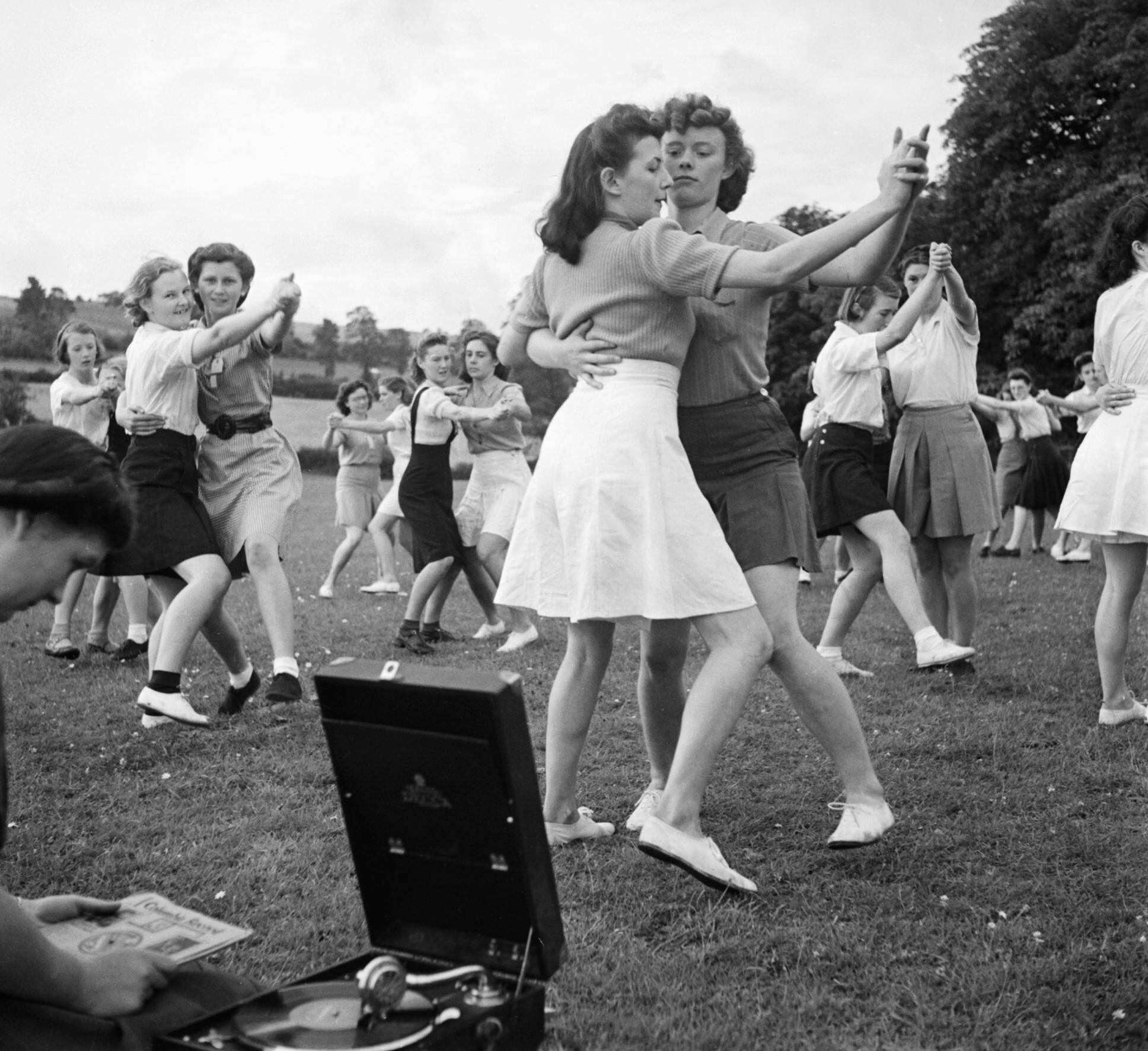
Students dancing in pairs (holding each other ballroom style), learning European folk dance as part of their physical education class, United Kingdom, 1943

Early formal dance education was heavily influenced by Western dance styles and, as a consequence, was a highly technical discipline, focusing on specific routines and requiring set steps. However, the 1926 marked the introduction of the first dance major into the college curriculum. Consequently, the 20th century saw an increased emphasis on creativity and self-expression in dance curricula. This shift has been reflected in formal education.

=== Primary education ===
Due to primary children being naturally active, the dance curriculum strives to build upon this. Younger children have a harder time remembering full dance routines, so it is important that they focus more on listening to the beats of the music and practicing beginner moves to the rhythm. Although dance education in general does not have an extremely rigid framework, dance in primary education embodies this flexibility and strongly emphasizes the importance of creativity.

=== Secondary education ===
Dance has not currently established its role in secondary education due to an increasingly overwhelming focus of modern education on disciplines like mathematics, science, and literacy. The general guidelines for implementing dance in secondary education stress the importance of self-expression and independence as teenagers exhibit a strong desire to establish their identity. It is important for the representatives of this age group not to feel like engaging in dance is threatening their ego.

=== Higher education ===
The implementation of dance into formal education first began in the sector of higher education. Higher dance education focuses on the intellectual inspection of human physicality rather than the training of professional dancers. Consequently, there is an increasing conflict between formal higher dance education and the education of actual professional dancers, who mostly train in private sectors.

== Dance education around the world ==
Dance has faced many challenges on a global level on its way to becoming an acknowledged form of art and part of the wider education system. Its current place in education is still under discussion. Different countries have varied perspectives and approaches to dance education due to dance's close connection with the cultural identity of ethnic groups.

=== United States ===
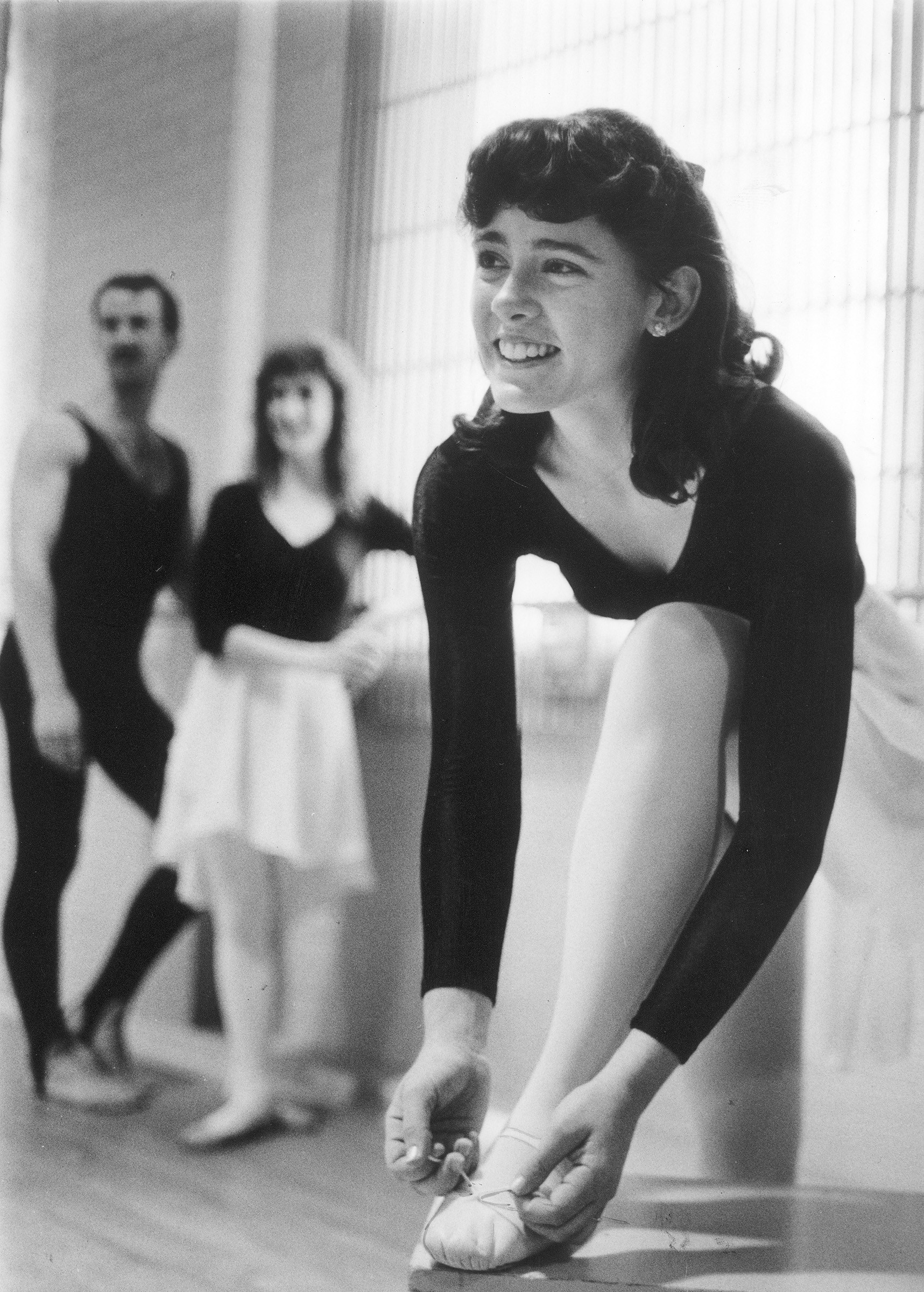
University of Texas at Arlington dance class

The United States was the first nation to introduce dance into formal education. Dance education in the US is more prevalent in colleges and universities. The American dance curriculum is based on national voluntary arts education standards. The United States dance framework focuses on performing, choreographing, and relating dance to other disciplines.

==== History of dance education in the United States ====
===== Early to middle 20th century =====
Up until the start of the 1900s, dance was considered an integral part of upper class life, but it was not viewed as part of one's education. The 1910s and 1920s saw the rise of dance in colleges and universities. In 1926, the first dance major was created in the University of Wisconsin by Margaret H’Doubler. At this point, dance education was part of physical education. Dance was mainly taught to females until legislation required educators to place focus on coeducational sports, marking the start of expanding dance into many realms. The early 20th century lacked a unified standard approach to dance with very few written resources of teaching dance.

===== Late 20th century to 21st century =====
In the 1960s Dance began slowly transitioning from physical education into the realms of fine and performance arts, with increasingly more colleges and universities starting to offer dance majors. The 1970s are described as the boom of dance in colleges and universities and shaped the dance education as we know it today. The development of voluntary arts education standards in 1996 initiated the standardisation of dance across America. The start of the new century has outlined new challenges for dance education such as implementing technology into dance education, using dance to support diverse groups and creating experiences for interdisciplinary learning.

=== Europe ===
In Europe, dance is more widely accepted as part of formal education, especially in primary schools. For instance, Germany requires public primary schools to make dance part of the official curriculum. Portugal has implemented dance into physical education of secondary school students. However, different countries face different challenges. In Finland, for example, dance is more advocated as part of the formal education in private sectors as opposed to Germany and Portugal.

=== Australia and New Zealand ===
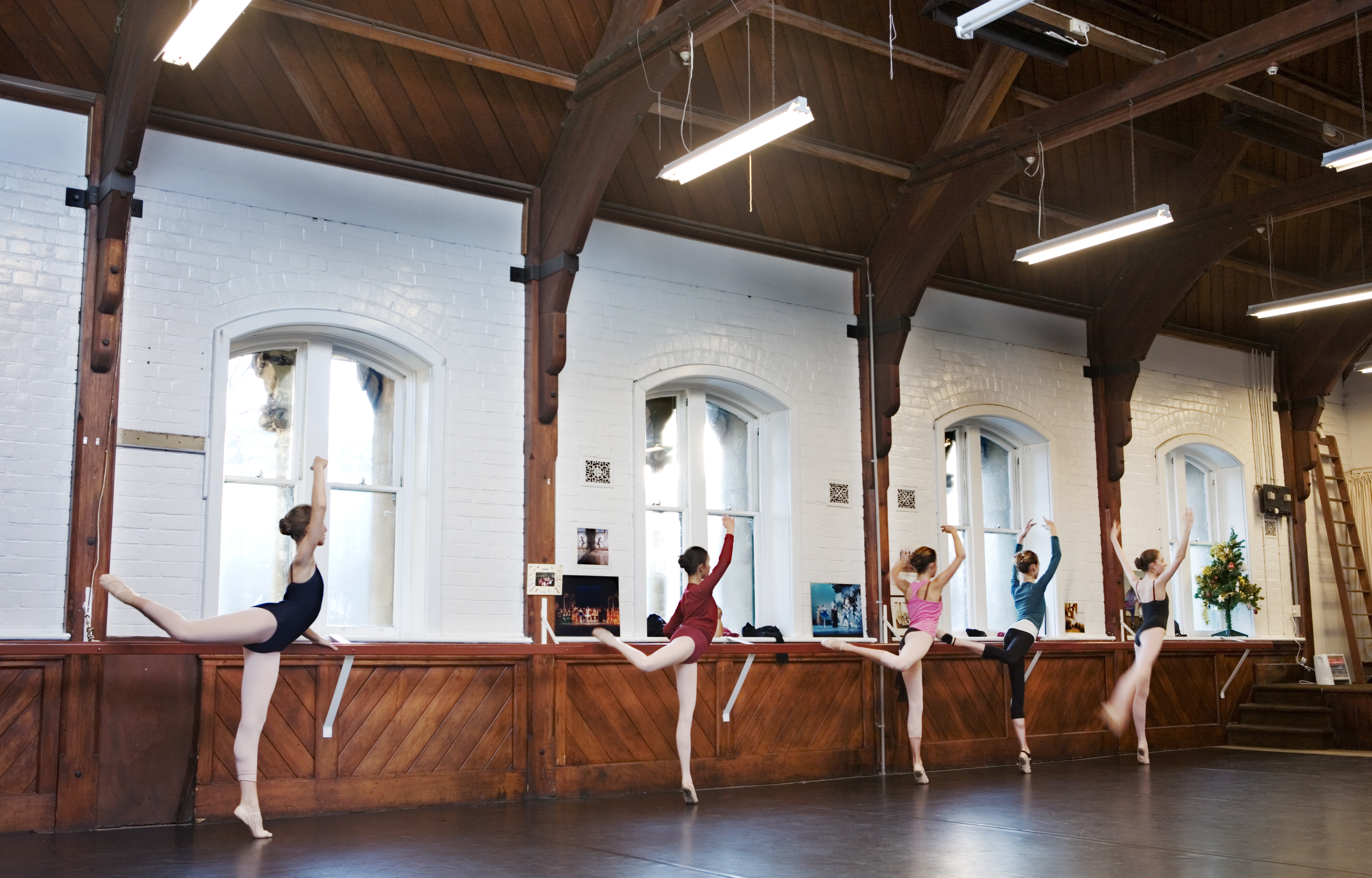
Dance class in Christchurch, New Zealand

The Australian Curriculum, Assessment and Reporting Authority has implemented a national dance curriculum. Australia has also increased the number of generalist teachers to implement dance as part of their teaching techniques. New Zealand, on the other hand, has eliminated dance from most of its schools, favoring numeracy and literacy more. The country is still facing many debates in regards to the role of dance in education.

=== South Africa ===
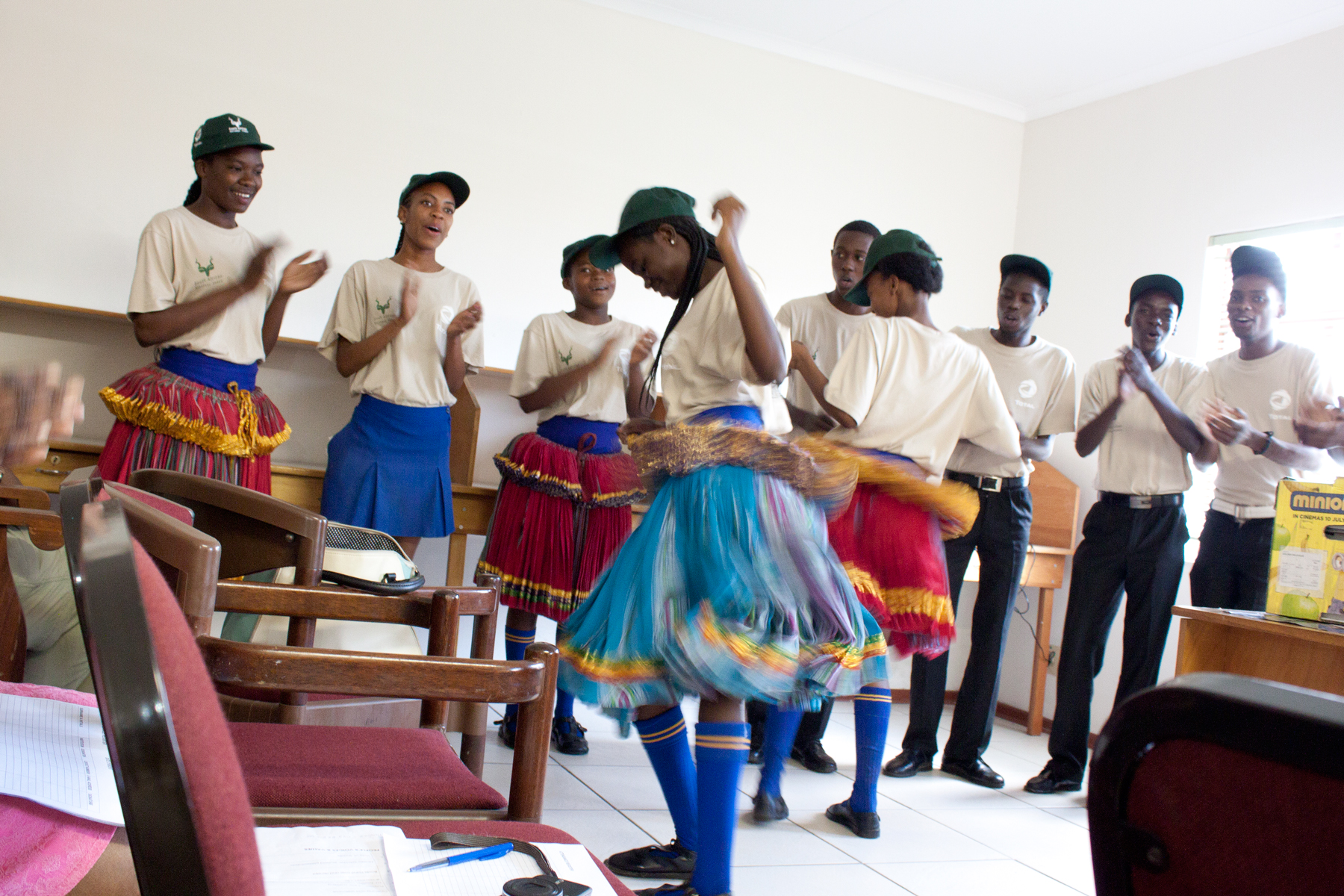
A traditional school welcome dance in Mpumalanga, South Africa

In the case of South Africa, classical ballet was the only primarily available form of dance education before 1994 and was taught in a few schools that charged extra fees on top of the school tuition. However, with the recent changes in the National Curriculum, all schools in the Western Cape are required to include dance education in their curriculum. The unique aspect of the current South African dance education system is its emphasis on teaching cultural heritage through dance. Although the multicultural identity of South Africa poses difficulties in unifying assessments and curricula, the current system strives to improve the dance education system with the aims of teaching lifelong skills and appreciation of one's cultural heritage through dance.

=== Syria ===
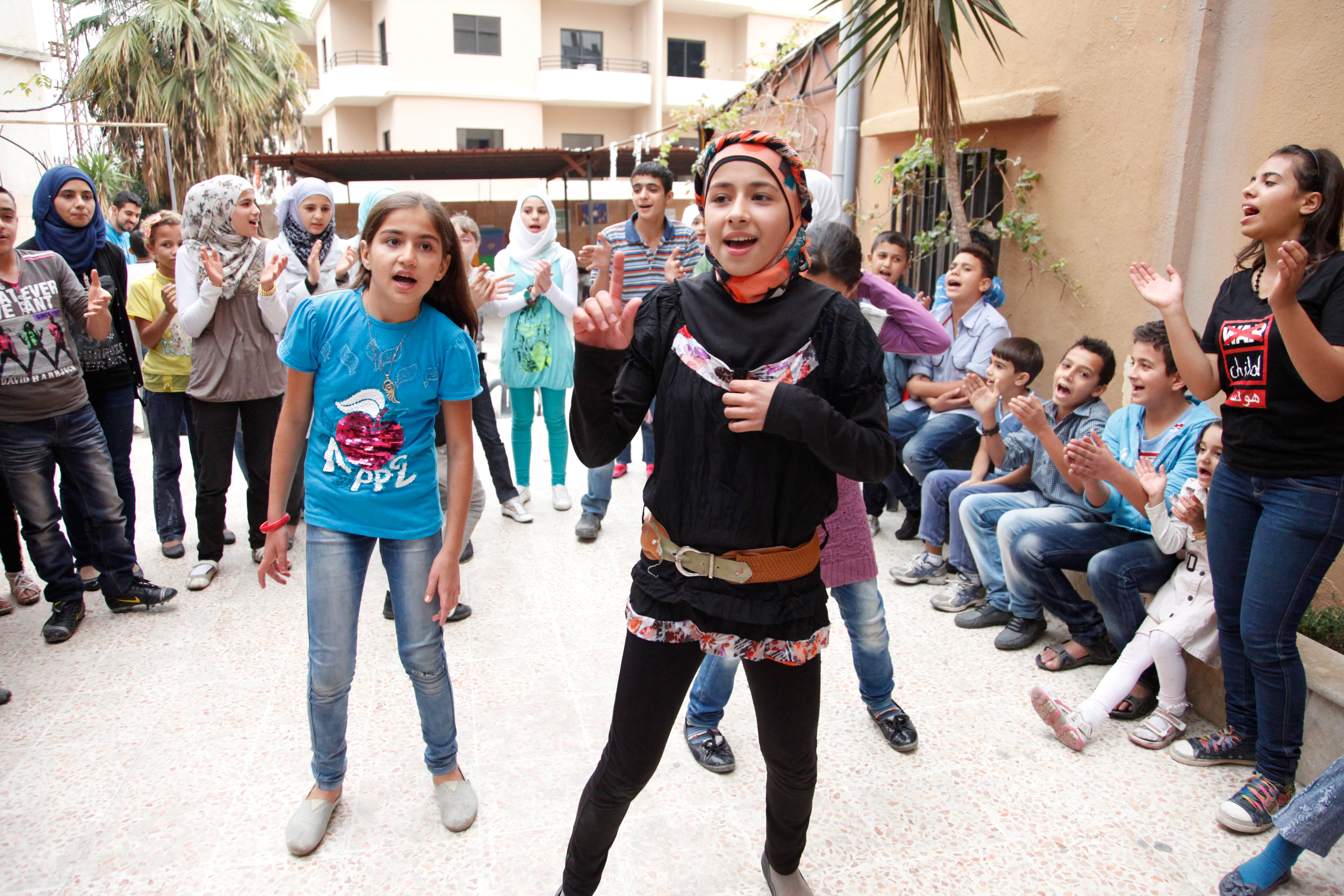
Dancing in Syria has become a source of hope during the civil war.

Syria has a long history of dance education woven into its culture and traditions. Dance in Syria was influenced heavily by Europe and Russia and performed in nonformal settings of homes and communities. With the start of the Civil War in Syria, dance practices have continued. However, the war resulted in many artists leaving the country. Although the lack of resources and staff shortage made it hard to maintain systematic efforts in teaching dance, those still engaged in dance education highlight how dance has become a source of hope, support, and reassurance during the uncertain times of their home country.

=== Singapore ===
Dance has been part of the Singaporean school system starting from 1967. However, dance is to this day not an official subject of study in Singapore. There is no national framework outline for dance education. Dance is embedded in the Physical Education curriculum. Furthermore, as stated by the National Arts Council of Singapore, research and documentation in the area of dance education are severely lacking. The classification of dance education, or arts education in general, as a field of low priority is partly attributed to the heavy focus on developing the nation's economy. The education system, thus, focuses more on scientific and humanistic subjects with almost no room for aesthetic appreciation of different arts.

=== South Korea ===
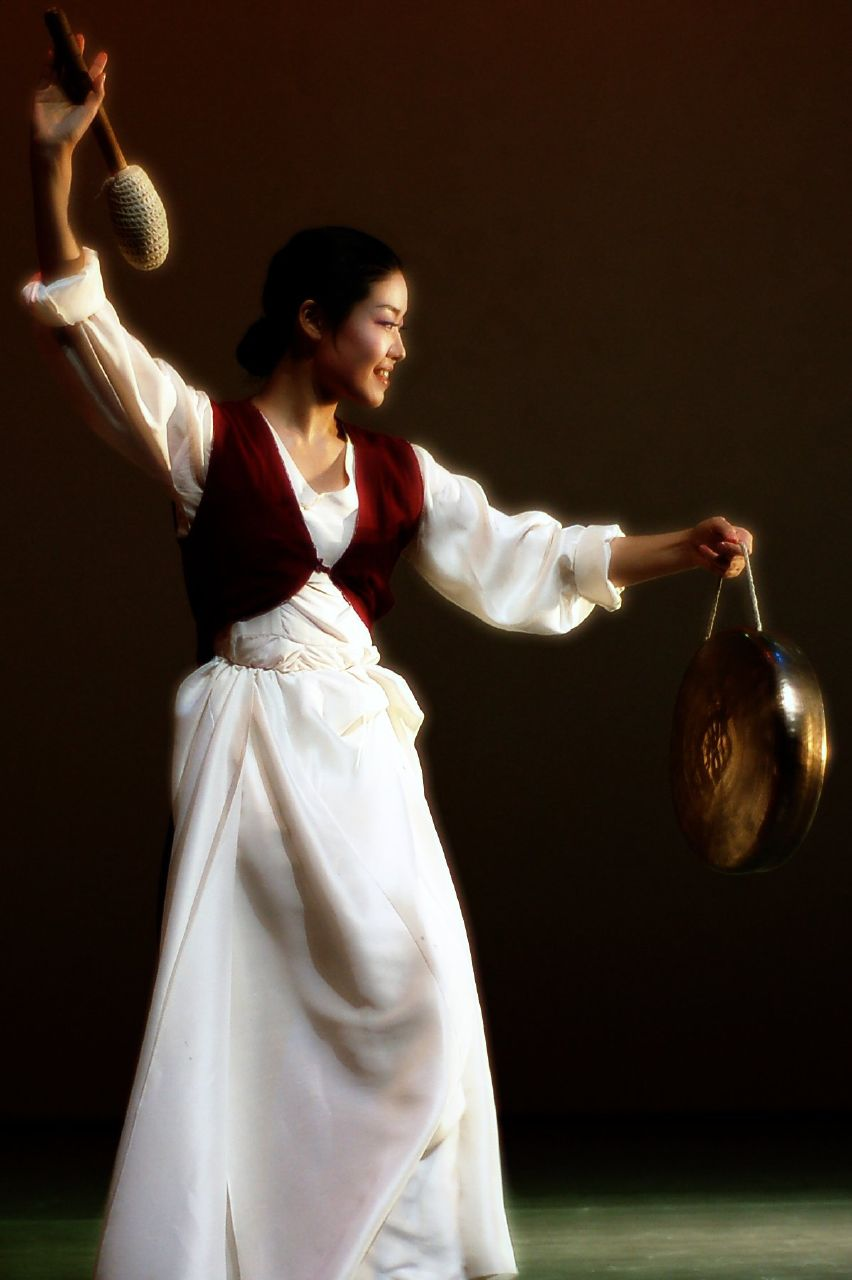
South Korean dance

South Korea has implemented 7 iterations of the national dance curricula formulated by the Ministry of Education, Science and Technology. The latest iteration places special focus on fostering rational thinking and developing creative expression through dance. However, the national dance curriculum is questioned in terms of its efficacy as there are no measurable effects of dance on the development of creativity. Dance is offered in schools based on demand, with the majority of South Korean schools not offering dance courses at all.

== Standards and assessments ==
Dance is evaluated in varying ways across many countries, institutions and methodologies. There are two levels of evaluating dance: individual performance assessments and teaching program evaluations.

On one hand, it is the process of evaluating students’ individual performances. Some of the most common dance assessment methods are auditions and stage performances, direct observations in class, self-assessments, peer responses, portfolios, and written examinations of dance knowledge. Dance educators strongly advocate the standardization of curricula and assessments in order to improve teaching methods. The National Dance Association of the United States has formulated seven standards by which students are evaluated. These standards include a various set of skills, from being able to understand and perform choreographies to applying critical thinking and problem-solving skills to learning dance.

On the other hand, dance assessment refers to the process of evaluating dance teaching programs. Dance program assessments are mostly based on the framework of best practices created by experts. However, dance evaluation studies are rarely published, making it hard for the dance community to reach a consensus on unified international standards.

However, dance evaluation is an extremely complex process on levels of both individual performances and teaching programs as dance is a nonverbal form of art and is closely tied to many parts of one's personal identity such as body image, sexuality, gender, religion as well as spirituality. Evaluating dance, both in terms of individual student performances and programs, is still a big challenge in dance education. Overall, dance evaluation is based on the dancer's presence, movement, rhythm, timing, posture, and how well the skills are executed.

== Factors influencing dance education ==
The ability to pursue dance education through stages of formal education and later as a career is defined by a number of different factors.

=== Physical fitness ===
The ability to meet the physical demands of a given task is crucial in being able to perform dance. Professional and pre-professional dancers exhibit greater than average flexibility and muscular strength. It is essential for dancers to maintain muscle mass as it directly influences strength production.

=== Memory ===
Dancers are found to have higher than average muscle memory that allows them to recall dance movements of a given choreography. Professional dancers, especially, are known to have an outstanding long-term memory.

According to a study conducted by Harvard Medical School, dance improves brain health by being a very great stress reliever as well as produces serotonin. Overall, dance helps with long-term memory and spatial recognition.

=== Musicality ===
Musicality encompasses four main elements of rhythm, melody, harmony and tone colour. Dance students naturally respond to external stimuli with movement and are generally more sensitive to music.

=== Personality ===
Research examining correlations between personality traits and successful dance careers is extremely lacking Dance talent development across the lifespan: a review of current research. There are findings linking dancers to such personality traits like openness to new experiences and creativity. However, there is not enough empirical evidence to conclude that certain personality traits lead to higher success in pursuing dance education.

=== Motivation ===
Success in dance education is dependent on optimal motivation, growth mindsets, well-developed psychological strength and social skills. Motivated dancers are more likely to persist with their education and sharpen their capabilities to attain optimal results.

=== Support ===
A key element of successful dance education is access to a variety of sources such as teachers, mentors, parents and financial resources. The latter has the most weight as the ability to travel and gain access to dance lessons with competent instructors is directly linked to one's financial means.

== Current issues in dance education ==
=== Gender issues ===
Dance has been historically perceived as part of one's gender role. However, dance has been increasingly classified as a female art form as a by-product of the Western culture and rise of feminist viewpoints. The majority of those engaged in dance education and formal training are female.

=== Lack of research in dance education ===
There is an acute lack of active research available in the field of dance education. This is partly because most dance educators are more engaged in teaching, choreographing and performing dance as well as directing a student body, leaving little time and room for prospective research. The main questions that need answers in the form of research revolve around the effects of dance education on its learners, assessment of dance education, and methodologies of different institutions as well as teachers.

=== Diversity in dance education research ===
Dance research in the 1970s had the tendency to present non-Western forms of dance as inferior to the Western theatrical dance. This phenomenon became especially apparent in ballet - it was defined as the pinnacle of dance. Although the issue of Western bias in dance education research remains present, the efforts to enrich the dance education identity with diversity have received significant support and investment.

== See also ==
- Ballet training
- Dance squad
- National Dance Education Organization
- Competitive dance
- International Dance Day
