= Kirsten Bloom Allen =

American dancer

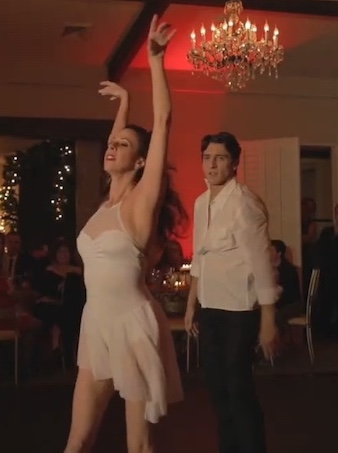
- Allen performing with Christopher Ruud in 2017
- Born: Kirsten Bloom; Cleveland, Ohio, U.S.
- Education: Melbourne High School
- Occupations: Ballet dancer; actress
- Years active: 1993–present
- Organization: ARC Entertainment Company
- Known for: Sacramento Ballet; Orlando Ballet; Suzanne Farrell Ballet
- Notable credits: A Streetcar Named Desire; The Great Gatsby; The Nutcracker; Romeo and Juliet; Swan Lake
- Website: kirstenbloomallen.com

Kirsten Bloom Allen is an American ballet dancer, actress and founder for ARC Entertainment Company, who appeared in multiple Sacramento Ballet productions, including A Streetcar Named Desire (1999), Romeo and Juliet (2000), Swan Lake (2001), Dracula (2004), The Taming of the Shrew (2007), and The Nutcracker (2013). Born in Cleveland, Ohio, she began dancing at age 5 and started her professional career with the Orlando Ballet at age 16.

== Personal life ==
Allen was born in Cleveland, Ohio and grew up in Kansas City, Missouri. She began dancing when she was 5 years old. At age 10, her family moved to Florida, living in Tampa and Melbourne. Allen was an intern before she started dancing professionally with the Orlando Ballet when she was 16. She graduated from Melbourne High School and relocated to California when she was 21. Allen moved to Rancho Santa Fe, California in 2009.

== Career ==
In 1987, Allen sang "We Are the World" at an anti-nuclear event at Port Canaveral. In 1993, she starred as Juliet in a production of Romeo and Juliet at Tampa Bay Performing Arts Center, reprising the role in 2000 for the Sacramento Ballet.

In 2015, Allen portrayed Daisy Buchanan in a production of The Great Gatsby at San Diego State University and worked on the choreographed duet Beyond the Barre: Beer and Ballet influenced by Samson and Delilah in 2016.

In 2019, Allen performed at the Music Box San Diego with Brian Justin Crum for a Valentine's Day event. She started her own production company, ARC Entertainment Company, a cross between ballet, cinema, and rock music. Her company produced original suicide prevention videos for the songs "A Reason to Fight" and "The Sound of Silence" by Disturbed.

During the COVID-19 pandemic, Allen lived with two other dancers so they could continue to practice dancing, perform backyard ballets, and host online dance classes through Zoom. During the Russo-Ukrainian war in 2022, she supplied a fellow dancer with medical supplies and food overseas to help destitute people.

=== Sacramento Ballet ===
Previously with the Southern Ballet Theatre and Suzanne Farrell Ballet, Allen joined the Sacramento Ballet in 1995, starring in many productions. In the late 1990s, Allen portrayed Hermia in A Midsummer Night's Dream, Dulcinea del Toboso in Don Quixote, and Blanche DuBois in A Streetcar Named Desire.

In the 2000s, Allen portrayed Lucy Westenra in Dracula, Princess Aurora in The Sleeping Beauty, Florence Foster Jenkins in Souvenir, Odette in a production of Swan Lake, Kate in The Taming of the Shrew, and the titular character in Giselle. In 2007, she wore clothing by Oscar de la Renta as part of a ballet fashion show in Fresno, California. In 2009, Allen left the Sacramento Ballet on maternity leave. She returned in 2013 for a performance as the Sugar Plum Fairy in The Nutcracker.

== Stage credits ==
| Year | Title | Role | Location | Notes |
|---|---|---|---|---|
| 1993 | Romeo and Juliet | Juliet | Tampa Bay Performing Arts Center | Bay Ballet Theater Production |
| 1993 | Coppélia | —N/a | Tampa Bay Performing Arts Center | Bay Ballet Theater Production |
| 1996 | Con Amore | Wife | Community Center Theater, Sacramento, California | |
| 1996 | The Rite of Spring | Parisian | Community Center Theater, Sacramento, California | |
| 1997 | A Midsummer Night's Dream | Hermia | Community Center Theater, Sacramento, California | |
| 1998 | Fluctuating Hemlines | —N/a | Community Center Theater, Sacramento, California | |
| 1998 | Don Quixote | Dulcinea del Toboso | Community Center Theater, Sacramento, California | Shared dancing role with Amy Seiwert |
| 1998 | The Nutcracker | Sugar Plum Fairy | Community Center Theater, Sacramento, California | |
| 1999 | A Streetcar Named Desire | Blanche DuBois | Community Center Theater, Sacramento, California | |
| 1999 | Swingtime | —N/a | Community Center Theater, Sacramento, California | |
| 1999 | Fluctuating Hemlines | —N/a | Community Center Theater, Sacramento, California | |
| 1999 | Rubies | —N/a | Community Center Theater, Sacramento, California | Soloist |
| 2000 | Romeo and Juliet | Juliet | Community Center Theater, Sacramento, California | Shared dancing role with Tricia Sundbeck |
| 2000 | The Nutcracker | Sugar Plum Fairy | Paradise Performing Arts Center, Paradise, California | |
| | Allegro Brillante | | | Principal role |
| | Carmina Burana | | | Principal role |
| | Serenade | Waltz girl | | |
| | Songs of the Auvergne | | | Principal role |
| | Requiem | | | Principal role |
| | Bolero | | | Principal role |
| 2001 | Espresso | —N/a | University Theatre, California State University | |
| 2001 | Rough Draft | —N/a | University Theatre, California State University | |
| 2001 | Pas de Deux | Woman | Sacramento, California | |
| 2001 | Swan Lake | Odette / Black Swan | Community Center Theater, Sacramento, California | |
| 2002 | The Tempest | —N/a | Mondavi Center, UC Davis | |
| 2002 | Western Symphony | —N/a | Mondavi Center, UC Davis | |
| 2003 | Tschaikovsky Pas de Deux | —N/a | Community Center Theater, Sacramento, California | |
| 2003 | Voluntaries | —N/a | Community Center Theater, Sacramento, California | |
| 2004 | Giselle | Giselle | Community Center Theater, Sacramento, California | |
| 2004 | Dracula | Lucy Westenra | Community Center Theater, Sacramento, California | |
| 2006 | Beer & Ballet | —N/a | Sacramento Ballet Building | |
| 2006 | Scheherazade | Scheherazade | Community Center Theater, Sacramento, California | |
| 2007 | Apollo | —N/a | Majestic Theatre, Shanghai | |
| 2007 | Etosha | —N/a | China | |
| 2007 | Serenade | Soloist | Community Center Theater, Sacramento, California | |
| 2007 | Souvenir | Florence Foster Jenkins | Nate Holden Performing Arts Center, Los Angeles, California | Los Angeles Dance Invitational |
| 2007 | The Taming of the Shrew | Kate | Community Center Theater, Sacramento, California | |
| 2007 | The Nutcracker | Mother / Sugar Plum Fairy | Community Center Theater, Sacramento, California | |
| 2008 | A Woman's Journey: The Tamsen Donner Story | Dancer | Community Center Theater, Sacramento, California | By Ruth Whitman |
| 2008 | A Streetcar Named Desire | Blanche DuBois | Community Center Theater, Sacramento, California | |
| 2008 | The Sleeping Beauty | Princess Aurora | Community Center Theater, Sacramento, California | |
| 2009 | Capital Choreography Competition | —N/a | Crest Theatre | |
| 2009 | Don Quixote Pas de Deux | —N/a | Mondavi Center, UC Davis | Principal dancer |
| 2009 | Beer & Ballet | —N/a | Sacramento Ballet Studios | Dancer and choreographer |
| 2013 | The Nutcracker | Sugar Plum Fairy | Community Center Theater, Sacramento, California | |
| 2015 | The Great Gatsby | Daisy Buchanan | San Diego State University | |
| 2016 | Beyond the Barre: Beer & Ballet | —N/a | San Diego, California | Influenced by Samson and Delilah |

== Filmography ==
| Year | Title | Role | Notes |
|---|---|---|---|
| 2020 | Pas de Deux | Juliet | Short film featuring Cy Curnin |
| 2020 | Good Morning America | Herself | 1 episode |
| 2020 | Backyard Ballet Holiday Celebration | Herself | Hosted by Joey Fatone |
| 2021 | I Wish I Could Dance | Isabella | Short film |
| 2022 | Dr. Antonio | Lisa | Short film |
| 2022 | Mother Ballerina Producer | Herself | Short documentary film |
| 2022 | Seeing Other People | Key Ballerina | Short film |
| 2023 | Don't Die Hard | Farrah Fonteyn | |
| TBA | A Corpse in Kensington † | | |
| TBA | Fall of Giselle † | | |

Key
| † | Denotes films that have not yet been released |
