= Orlando Ballet =

General information
- Name: Orlando Ballet
- Previous names: Southern Ballet Theatre
- Year founded: 1974
- Principal venue: Dr. Phillips Center for the Performing Arts; Harriett's Orlando Ballet Centre; Orlando, Florida
- Website: orlandoballet.org

Senior staff
- Executive director: Bradley Renner

Artistic staff
- Artistic director: Jorden Morris

Other
- Official school: Orlando Ballet School

Orlando Ballet is an American professional ballet company based in Orlando, Florida. Orlando Ballet is the only fully residential ballet company in Central Florida, their main-stage productions performed at the Dr. Phillips Center for the Performing Arts and Harriett's Orlando Ballet Centre. The ballet currently employs 25 full time national and international dancers. The company also supports pre-professional dancers through Orlando Ballet II, the second company.

The company performs the Nutcracker annually.

Orlando Ballet's mission statement is "Orlando Ballet entertains, educates, and enriches through the highest quality of dance."

== History ==
The company was founded in 1974 as the Performing Arts Company of Florida. They changed their name in 1978 to the Southern Ballet Theatre, and began performances at the Bob Carr Theatre.

Since 2021, the company has been led by Artistic Director Jorden Morris. The company was previously led by Robert Hill from 2009 to 2021.

== Company ==
=== Artistic ===
Jorden Morris—Orlando Ballet Artistic Director

Lisa Thorn Vinzant—Associate Artistic Director

Heath Gill—Rehearsal Director

Yan Chen—Guest Teacher

=== Dancers ===
Name	Position	Nationality
John Abentany	Dancer	USA
Sofia Abentany	Dancer	Bulgaria
Cameron Bailey	Apprentice	UK
Isadora Bless	Apprentice	Paraguay
Kirsten Bloom Allen	Dancer	USA
Dahlia Denicore	Dancer	USA
Amir Dodarkhojayev	Dancer	Kazakhstan
Israel Zavaleta Escobedo	Dancer	Mexico
Kellie Fulton	Dancer	USA
Kate Gardinier	Dancer	USA
Thomas Gerhardt	Dancer	UK
Kenna Gold	Dancer	USA
Ellie Iannotti	Dancer	USA
Hazuki Kishida	Apprentice	Canada
Anamarie McGinn	Dancer	USA
Charlie Mellor	Dancer	UK
Francis Mihm	Dancer	USA
Hitomi Nakamura	Dancer	Japan
Jackie Nash	Dancer	USA
Alberto Peñalver	Dancer	Spain
Nathan Rowell	Dancer	USA
Sebastian Marriott-Smith	Dancer	UK
Trevor Stalcup	Dancer	USA
Jaysan Stinnett	Dancer	USA
David West	Dancer	USA

== Orlando Ballet School ==
Orlando Ballet is also known for their training program, the Orlando Ballet School. As part of their trainee programs the Orlando Ballet School is home to OBII (Orlando Ballet Second Company). There are annual summer intensives, as well as camps and year-round classes. These classes include camps and variation expos for children and pre-professional dancers as well as the Fitness Thru Dance program offered for teens and adults who are interested in fun and innovative ways to stay fit.

They are an affiliate of the American Ballet Theatre.

=== Orlando Ballet Second Company ===
All OBII dancers are selected through an audition process by the artistic director and the OBS (Orlando Ballet School) Director. Performing in both company and school dances, these dancers train and rehearse with the company on a regular basis. They present new and classical works to underprivileged youth and senior citizens and perform for over 50,000 people every year at schools, local festivals, nursing homes, and premiere Orlando theaters. OBII is the top level of the Orlando Ballet School and serves to help pre-professional dancers work their way into the professional world from their trainee program.

=== Summer Intensive ===
OBS's Summer Intensive Programs are for intermediate to advanced students ages 9+. The programs place a strong emphasis on technique for ballet while also incorporating other forms of dance such as jazz, men's, partnering, modern, pointe, variations, and character performance.

The length of these summer intensives depends on the program, lasting anywhere between one and five weeks long.

OBS provides housing for Summer Intensive for all students who require it.

== Community Enrichment ==
Orlando Ballet offers a robust Community Enrichment program, offering complimentary dance classes throughout Central Florida. Current programming reaches more than 18,000 participants annually.

=== First STEPS ===
Through First STEPS, Orlando Ballet teaching artists partner with regular classroom teachers to integrate creative movement into regular classroom instruction. This ten-week residency includes arts-integrated techniques that help students in other subject areas like literacy, language, and math. Participating teachers receive a set of dance-themed picture books to use in their classroom, and each class receives a visit from Orlando Ballet dancers as part of their participation. First STEPS reaches approximately 800 VPK and Kindergarten students annually.

=== STEPS ===
Targeting economically marginalized communities and modeled after a program developed by New York's Dance Theatre of Harlem, STEPS provides 2nd-5th graders in Central Florida with the opportunity to acquire a comprehensive knowledge of dance as an art form. Classes are held in schools and community centers throughout Central Florida. Participants receive training in ballet as well as other dance styles from professional teaching artists over a thirteen-week residency that culminates in a final showcase for family and friends. Students receive dancewear as part of their class. Students are also assessed for possible scholarships to attend further training at Orlando Ballet (through the Bridge Scholarship program, distributed based on demonstrated financial need to dedicated and capable dancers.) STEPS programming reaches approximately 800 2nd-5th graders annually.

=== REACH ===
Modeled after the STEPS program, REACH provides students from 6th-12th grade in economically disadvantaged schools the opportunity to receive professional dance training. Over this nine-week-long residency, students receive nearly thirty hours of training in ballet and other forms of dance. Participants receive complimentary dancewear and present a showcase for their families and friends at the end of the residency. Approximately 200 students participate in REACH annually.

=== RISE ===
One of Community Enrichment's newest programs, RISE invites middle and high schools with existing Performing Arts Dance Magnet Programs to partner with Orlando Ballet to elevate their student experience to the next level. Students receive an additional thirty hours of training from our teaching artists with emphasis on technique and choreography, all centered around preparation for entering professional careers in dance. As part of their experience, students are invited to observe professional company rehearsals at Orlando Ballet. At the conclusion of their residencies, students come to Harriett's Orlando Ballet Centre in an event that includes a full day of workshops followed by a showcase of their work for the community. Students are also extended invitations to continue their training with Orlando Ballet and receive valuable exposure to other arts professionals throughout the United States. Approximately 200 dancers participate in RISE annually.

Since beginning in the 2021–2022 school year, RISE participants have gone on to incredible achievements. Students have accepted or been offered opportunities to pursue the next stages of their dance careers with the following:

Professional Contracts:

- Peridance Contemporary Dance Company
- Royal Caribbean
- Ruth Page Center for the Arts

Summer Intensives:

- Boston Conservatory
- Brenau University
- Central Florida Ballet
- DanzForce Extreme
- Florida Southern University
- Florida State University
- Footworks Dance Studio
- French Woods Festival
- Gus Giordano Dance School
- Joffrey Ballet
- Jon Lehrer Dance Company
- MoBBallet
- NobleMotion Dance
- Orlando Ballet
- Peridance Center
- Raskin Dance Studio
- Suzanne Farrell Ballet
- Valencia College
- White Swan Academy

Higher Education:

- AMDA College of Performing Arts
- Arizona State University
- Bates College
- Boston Conservatory
- Colorado State University
- Dean College
- Florida A&M University
- Florida Atlantic University
- Florida Southern College
- Florida State University Jacksonville University
- Kent State University
- Lindenwood University
- Marymount Manhattan College Northern Illinois University
- Old Dominion University
- Palm Beach Atlantic University
- Point Park University
- Sam Houston State University
- Seton Hall University
- Shenandoah University
- Texas A&M University
- Texas Christian University
- The Ohio State University
- University of Florida
- University of Minnesota University of North Carolina School of the Arts
- University of South Florida
- University of Tennessee
- Valencia College
- Webster University

Competitive Dance:

- Junior Olympics Dance Competition
- Orlando Tap Festival
- Revel Dance Convention Genesis
- Showstoppers Nationals
- World Ballet Competition

In total, RISE participants have received more than $1,000,000 in scholarship offers.

=== Come Dance With Us! ===
Come Dance With Us! unites the efforts of Orlando Ballet teaching artists and medical experts to provide adapted dance classes for dancers with disabilities in Central Florida. Integral to the success of Come Dance With Us! is the partnership shared with both Nemours Children's Health Systems Florida and Orlando Health Arnold Palmer Hospital for Children who provide both aids in the classroom and valuable insight to our teaching artists on how to give each participant a positive experience. Current programming primarily serves children between the ages of 3–9, with expansion to a wider range of ages coming soon. Under the Come Dance With Us! umbrella are two distinct programs:

- Come Dance With Us!: Movement Mentor©: Held at Harriett's Orlando Ballet Centre during the spring and fall terms, this unique class provides training in creative dance, ballet, and jazz basics to children with various developmental, behavioral, and/or physical challenges. Each student is paired with a student mentor from the Orlando Ballet School's advanced levels for a one-on-one dance experience. These student-mentor partnerships are maintained throughout the entire class. Teachers of this course are specifically trained and certified in the Movement Mentor© curriculum prior to teaching the class. Students who participate in the spring session are invited to perform in the end-of-year showcase with other students in the Orlando Ballet School.

Information about registering your child for an upcoming session of Come Dance With Us!: Movement Mentor© is available now.

- Come Dance With Us!: Dance Reimagined: Orlando Ballet teaching artists teach weekly classes for participating Orange, Osceola, and Seminole County Public Schools to students in special education programs. Led by Movement Mentor certified teachers, these 45-minute classes introduce students to ballet, jazz, and creative movement. Orlando Ballet teaching artists work closely with classroom teachers to support the overall education of each student.

Orlando Ballet Community Enrichment is currently piloting Come Dance With Us!: Heart of Hearing, a class specifically designed for deaf and hard of hearing participants.

=== Neon Club ===
For more than 35 years, the city of Orlando has hosted Neon Club. Orlando Ballet is proud to continue the tradition. Participants and their families, friends, and/or caregivers are welcome to join each month for an evening of dancing, socializing, food, and fun. The event is held each month on the first Friday of the month and has different themes.

=== Intro to Ballet ===
Thanks to a valuable partnership with Orange County Public Schools, approximately 16,000 second-grade students throughout Orange County are given the opportunity to experience a live performance of The Nutcracker, presented by Orlando Ballet. As part of this partnership, Community Enrichment provides teachers with a study guide with materials designed to enrich and enhance the experience of students at the performance. Created in connection with the state standards of education, this study guide includes five arts-integrated lesson plans that prepare students for their experience at the ballet.

=== Gentle BeMoved ===
Developed by Sherry Zunker, BeMoved and Gentle BeMoved are specifically intended for participants with limited mobility due to age, health, or injury. Each class includes themed music (such as the Roaring 20s, Latin, Country Rhythm, and Blues). BeMoved classes are conducted from a standing position, while Gentle BeMoved is primarily conducted from a seated position. Each class includes a warm-up, a themed genre portion of dance combinations accessible for all participants regardless of previous experience in dance, and a cool down.

== Controversy ==
Orlando Ballet had a highly publicized contract dispute with the Dr. Phillips Center for the Performing Arts, along with Orlando Philharmonic and Opera Orlando regarding the performing arts center's new Steinmetz Hall. A deal was eventually reached.
