= National Dance Education Organization =

Non-profit organization in the United States

- Abbreviation: NDEO
- Formation: 1998
- Type: Non-profit
- Legal status: 501(c)(3) organization
- Purpose: Dance education support and advocacy
- Headquarters: Silver Spring, Maryland, United States
- Region served: United States
- Official language: English
- Affiliations: National Honor Society for Dance Arts
- Website: www.ndeo.org

The National Dance Education Organization (NDEO), located in Silver Spring, Maryland, was established in 1998 as a national non-profit organization supporting dance education and dance in the United States generally. It is a membership services organization that supports dance teachers with programs and services. Its background lies in the response to Title IX (1972), and the Equal Educational Opportunity Act (1974) and the changes to physical education and sports science leading to dance becoming more closely aligned to the performing arts. NDEO publishes (via Taylor and Francis) "The Journal of Dance Education" (JODE) and the "Dance Education in Practice" (DEiP) and offers an annual National Conference, smaller special topic conferences, and 26+ online dance education courses via its Online Professional Development Institute (OPDI). NDEO received a grant from the National Endowment for the Arts (NEA) to support state initiatives to develop and align state and local school district standards, curriculum frameworks, assessments, certification, teacher training, and more through developing 3 to 5 year State Plans. NDEO administers the high school honor society National Honor Society for Dance Arts.

== See also ==
- National Dance Association
