= Hawkins' School of Performing Arts =

Ballet school in Folsom, California

Coordinates: 38°39′25″N 121°11′4″W

Hawkins' School of Performing Arts is primarily a ballet school in Folsom, California, USA. It is the ballet school and training space for the Folsom Lake Civic Ballet.
