= Pat Colgate =

Dance company artistic director

Pat Colgate is the artistic director of the Placer Theatre Ballet dance company, which she founded. She designs all costumes and directs choreography for each original ballet staged there.

Pat Colgate trained in ballet in Boston, and became a member of the Boston Ballet. From there, she trained with American Ballet Theatre school in New York City at the age of 15.

She has performed with the Boston Ballet, Opera Company of Boston, and the New York City Rockettes. In New York, she appeared in Bye Bye Birdie, Hit the Deck, and Destry Rides Again. In San Francisco, she appeared in Funny Girl, Annie Get Your Gun, 42nd Street, Follies, La Cage Aux Folles, A Chorus Line, No, No, Nanette, Good News, The Pajama Game, Gypsy: A Musical Fable, The Music Man, Of Thee I Sing, Godspell, Sugar, and Guys and Dolls.

She has owned her own dance company for 25 years in the San Francisco Bay area before relocating to Placer County, California.
