= Paradosi Ballet Company =

Ballet company based in Washington, US

General information
- Name: Paradosi Ballet Company
- Previous names: Paradosi Christian Ballet Company
- Year founded: 2007
- Founders: Joel & Tennille Carver
- Location: Tacoma, Washington
- Website: www.paradosiballet.org www.paradosiballetcompany.com

Senior staff
- Executive Director: Jeff Bischoff

Artistic staff
- Artistic Director: Larissa Bischoff

Other
- Official school: Surrendered School of Dance www.surrenderedschool.org

Paradosi Ballet Company is a professional Christian dance company and ballet ministry based in Tacoma, Washington. Founded in 2007, Paradosi is recognized as the first professional Christian ballet company in the Pacific Northwest. The organization operates as a 501(c)(3) nonprofit and includes a touring company, an apprentice and ballet trainee program, and an affiliated school, the Surrendered School of Dance.

== History and Founding ==
Paradosi Ballet Company was established to unite classical ballet technique with Christian worship and evangelism. The founders envisioned a professional ensemble that would use dance as a form of worship and public testimony. Early performances were presented in churches and community venues throughout Washington before the company expanded to national and international tours.

The first international mission occurred in 2010 in France, marking the beginning of Paradosi’s global outreach ministry. Subsequent European tours expanded to Switzerland, Germany, Austria, Belgium, and the Netherlands. Paradosi has appeared at major cultural events such as the Festival d’Avignon and the Montreux Jazz Festival, often partnering with local churches and missionary organizations to share faith-based performances. Leadership later transitioned to Executive Director, Jeff Bischoff and Artistic Director, Larissa Bischoff, who continue to lead the company’s ministry, education, and touring initiatives.

== Mission and Ministry Focus ==
Paradosi’s mission statement is: “Through the arts we will worship God, love people, share the gospel, and make disciples of Jesus everywhere we go.” The company expresses this mission through worship events, prayer ministry, teaching, and outreach in churches, schools, care centers, shelters, and other public venues. Its programs combine dance, sermons, and personal testimony to communicate biblical topics and encourage faith in audiences worldwide.

== Touring and Outreach History ==
Paradosi Ballet Company tours extensively throughout the United States and Europe, using dance as a platform for Christian worship and evangelism.

=== U.S. Touring ===
The company tours annually through Washington, Oregon, California, Arizona, and Idaho, dancing in churches, schools, and theaters. Expanded tours have reached Colorado, Delaware, Mississippi, North Carolina, South Carolina, Virginia, Pennsylvania, Ohio, Maryland, and Washington, D.C. Notable appearances include ministry and worship in 2022 at David’s Tent on the National Mall and outreach near the Supreme Court of the United States.

=== International Touring ===
Paradosi has completed multiple international tours, performing and teaching across Europe in partnership with churches and ministries:

- **2010 (France):** Avignon, Lyon, Paris – *Teaching, evangelism, and ministry connections tour*
- **2011 (France):** Avignon and Paris
- **2012 (France):** Avignon, Marseille, Nice, and Paris
- **2015 (France & Switzerland):** Villeneuve, Montreux, and Avignon
- **2019 (France & Switzerland):** Vevey, Montreux, and Avignon
- **2022 (France, Switzerland, Germany, Austria):** *Teaching, evangelism, and ministry connections tour*
- **2023 (France, Switzerland, Belgium):** Avignon, Paris, Montreux, Lausanne, Ouchy, Vevey, and Brussels
- **2025 (France, Belgium, Netherlands):** Avignon, Paris, Brussels, Dordrecht, and Rotterdam

These tours often coincide with major arts festivals such as the Festival d’Avignon and the Montreux Jazz Festival, and involve collaboration with churches, missionary organizations, and community ministries throughout Europe.

== Ballet Trainee and Apprentice Program ==
Established in 2011, the Paradosi Ballet Ministry Apprentice Program serves as both a ballet trainee program and an immersive discipleship experience. Apprentices train and perform alongside the professional touring company, receiving advanced instruction in ballet technique, choreography, and ministry leadership. The program integrates theology and evangelism courses with practical outreach training, preparing dancers for careers in both professional performance and Christian service.

  - Notable alumni include:**
- Lacee (Ebert) Sandgren – Artistic Director, Barbara’s Conservatory of Dance (Topeka, Kansas)
- Bonnie Calvert – Dance Director at Kats Artist Tree; former member of Phoenix Ballet and choreographer for Triad Performing Arts
- Hope Lehman – dancer with Ballet Magnificat! and Enoch Contemporary Ballet
- Samantha Harikian – instructor with Cal Arts and Sondance
- Amanda Pigott – instructor at Alpine Dance Academy

== Surrendered School of Dance (Official Training School) ==
Surrendered School of Dance

General information
- Name: Surrendered School of Dance
- Previous names: Surrendered School of the Arts
- Year founded: 2009
- Location: Tacoma, Washington
- Website: www.surrenderedschool.org

Surrendered School of Dance, was founded in 2009 as the official school of Paradosi Ballet Company, offers training in classical ballet, contemporary, and modern dance for students ages three through adult. The school operates campuses in Tacoma and Orting, and provides after-school programs through private school partnerships in Gig Harbor and Tacoma. Originally known as “Surrendered School of the Arts,” the school emphasizes technical excellence, spiritual growth, and age-appropriate artistic expression. It functions under the same nonprofit umbrella as Paradosi Ballet and provides a pathway into the company’s apprentice and ministry programs.

The school earned The News Tribune (Tacoma) | The News Tribune’s “Best of Pierce County” awards — Silver (2024) and Bronze (2025) — in the Dance Studio category.

== Artistic Style and Repertoire ==
Paradosi’s work combines classical and contemporary ballet with worship focused on connecting people to Jesus. Each season features original choreography by Artistic Director Larissa Bischoff, with contributions from EmmaLeah Resleff, Hannah Franco, Cambria Best, Tabi Spurlin, Bonnie Calvert, and others. Paradosi draws on the creativity and experience of both current company members and alumni to develop its repertoire.

=== Selected Notable Works and Worship Sets ===
- Grace to Grace (2024 – present)
- Let Us Adore Him! (2025 – present)
- Credo (2022 – 2023)
- Abide (2021 – 2022)
- All Things New (2020 – 2021)
- Living Hope (2019 – 2020)
- The Carols of Christmas (2018 – 2019)
- Closer (2016 – 2018)
- Forever (2014 – 2016)
- I AM (2013 – 2014)
- Sealed (2011 – 2012)
- Project Grace (2007 – 2010)

Early works such as *Project Grace*, *Sealed*, *I AM*, and *Forever* helped define Paradosi’s narratively driven and worship-centered artistic voice.
