= The Conservatory of Dance =

Ballet school in California

The Conservatory of Dance is a ballet school in Rocklin, California, USA and is also the official ballet school and training space for Ballet Rejoice Christian dance company.

In 1998, Alexi Berdyugin, a former soloist with the Bolshoi Ballet, and Nina Baratova, a former principal dancer with the Sacramento Ballet, joined the faculty at the Conservatory of Dance.

== Important people ==
- Sarah Russel, Owner and Director
- Tessa White, Founder and former owner
