= HomeLA =

Dance and performance project based in LA

HomeLA is a Los Angeles site-specific dance and performance project started by the choreographer and dancer Rebecca Bruno. The project functions on the donation of people's homes as temporary venue spaces.

The dance troupe seeks to view dance in domestic spaces, varying from the typical arenas that are viewed for performances. The interventions occur over a few days and the events happen irregularly every few months.

Bruno worked in partnership with the LA-based Pieter Performance space to publicize the first event and early portions of the archive reside at Los Angeles Contemporary Archive (LACA) where it can be accessed by the public.

== Events ==
The first installment of HomeLA happened over the course of a weekend at the home of Chloë Flores and Tim Lefebvre in their custom-built compound in Mount Washington, Los Angeles. Artist Flora Wiegmann swam laps in the home's outdoor pool entitled, Swimming Laps. Jill Stein's ZZA Sduai Airbara was an installation that occurred in the glass recreation room. Other performances have been held in Pacific Palisades, Highland Park, El Sereno, The Brewery, a home in downtown Los Angeles, San Marino, Claremont, and near the LA river in Frogtown.
