= Ririe-Woodbury Dance Company =

American contemporary dance company

Ririe-Woodbury Dance Company is an American contemporary dance company based in Salt Lake City, Utah. Founded in 1964 by University of Utah dance faculty members Joan Woodbury and Shirley Ririe, the company is dedicated to furthering contemporary dance by creating and performing original works of modern dance.

== Overview ==
Before founding the Ririe-Woodbury Dance Company in 1964, Shirley Ririe and Joan Woodbury helped create Choreodancers, a company of professional dance performers and teachers. After the Ririe-Woodbury Dance Company name became permanent, the company choreographed and performed in Utah, Arizona, California, and Colorado.

The following year, the company performed at The Space in New York City through director Alwin Nikolais. Representatives of the National Endowment for the Arts attended the performance and accepted the company for the Endowment's Artists In Schools and Dance Touring Programs.

Ririe-Woodbury Dance Company was chosen to be part of the Dance On Tour state-touring program from 1990 to 1994 and performed in South Carolina, Kentucky, Montana, and New Mexico.

In 1977, the International Congress of Girls' and Women's Sports invited the Company to South Africa for an extended tour of Cape Town, Port Elizabeth, Johannesburg, and Pretoria. In 1978, they were chosen by the United States as representatives to the first Dance and the Child International meeting in Canada.

In 1980 Ririe-Woodbury Dance Company performed in Šibenik of former Yugoslavia. The company also performed in Hong Kong; in Canton, China; the Philippines; and Singapore.

From 1987-1992 company tours included Europe, American Samoa, and the former Soviet Union. Just one month before the destruction of the Berlin Wall, the dancers performed in East Germany.

In 1993, the company traveled to Slovenia. Ririe-Woodbury performed a benefit fundraiser for 70,000 Bosnian war refugees who were seeking shelter in Slovenian collection centers.

Recently, the Nikolais/Louis Foundation for Dance selected Ririe-Woodbury as the dance company to house the works of modern dance innovator Alwin Nikolais, since his company, Nikolais Dance Theatre was no longer in operation.

In 2004 Ririe-Woodbury was one of five dance companies invited to perform at the Edinburgh International Festival. In 2006, the company presented Nikolais' "Tensile Involvement" at the Fall for Dance Festival in New York City.
