= Columbia City Jazz Dance Company =

The Columbia City Jazz Dance Company (CCJC) is a dance company based in Columbia, South Carolina. It was founded in 1990 by Dale Lam.

The company has performed in South Carolina and has also toured internationally. In 2006, it completed a five-week tour of China. Other reported appearances have included performances in Singapore, Bulgaria, Austria, and at the Piccolo Spoleto Festival in Charleston, South Carolina.

The company also presents dance instruction and outreach programs.
