= Folsom Lake Civic Ballet =

Ballet company based in California

Folsom Lake Civic Ballet is the official dance company for Folsom, California, United States. It is primarily pre-professional ballet, and most performers are auditioned from the Folsom dance school Hawkins School of Performing Arts, although adult dancers are invited as "guest artists".

== See also ==
- Culture of California
- List of ballet companies in the United States
