= Snappy Dance Theater =

Snappy Dance Theater (founded 1996) was a non-profit postmodern dance company located in Cambridge, Massachusetts, US. It was founded by artistic director Martha Mason, Marjorie Morgan and George Whiteside. It closed in June 2008 ″due to a lack of institutional support for fulltime modern dance companies in Massachusetts.″

== The Company ==
The company was composed of Mason, Carey McKinley (Foster), Roger Fernandes, Jeremy Towle, Lee Walden, Bonnie Duncan, and Tim Gallagher. Alumni included Cathy Calhoun Bosch, Sean Kilbridge, Jim Banta, James Tanabe, Eveline Mostovoy, Lucy Bunning, and Bess Whitesel. It was notable for integrating non-traditional dance forms (e.g. circus performance, martial arts, puppetry) with more traditional ones. It was part of the 2003–2004 Bank of America Celebrity Series, and performed as part of the Open Look Festival in Saint Petersburg, Russia.

== Awards ==
- 2004 Boston Phoenix readers poll: Best Contemporary Dance Company

== See also ==
- 20th century concert dance
