= List of Christian dance companies =

The following is a list of professional "Christian dance companies," defined as professional dance companies born out of their leadership's commitment to integrating their Christian faith with their approach to performing arts.

- Addeum Dance Co.
- Arrows International
- Ballet 5:8
- Ballet Magnificat!
- Chadash Contemporary Dance
- Enoch Contemporary Ballet
- Ingredients Dance Co.
- Messengerz Dance
- Open Sky Arts Collective
- Paradosi Ballet Company
- Project Dance
- Reverent Rhythms
- St. Paul's Folk Dance Club, Yonkers, New York
- Storling Dance Theater
- Zion Dance Project
