= Modern dance in the United States =

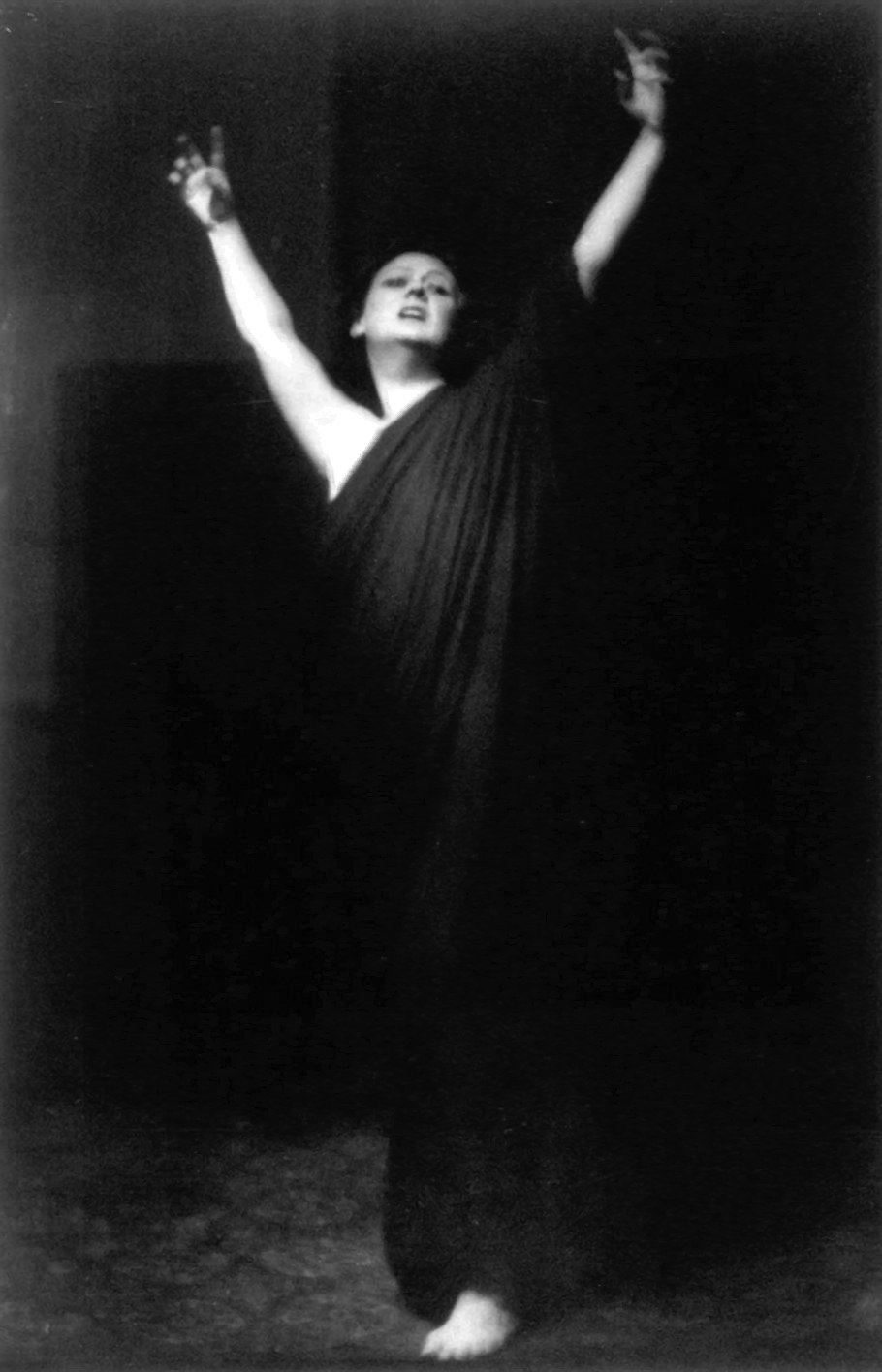
Isadora Duncan

Modern dance in the United States is a form of contemporary dance that was developed in the United States in the 20th century. African American modern dance also developed a distinct style.

== History ==
Closely related to the development of American music in the early 20th century was the emergence of a new, and distinctively American, art form – modern dance. Among the early innovators was Isadora Duncan (1878–1927), who stressed pure, unstructured movement in lieu of the positions of classical ballet. Duncan said "from early childhood I have considered the freedom of my body essential to rhythm of movement". Her emphasis on the natural world and body in the context of concert dance influenced the ideas of the modern dancers who succeed her in America.

The main line of development, however, runs from the dance company of Ruth St. Denis (1878–1968) and her husband-partner, Ted Shawn (1891–1972), which produced work exploring images from other countries that were considered exotic by American audiences. St. Denis' pupil Doris Humphrey (1895–1958) looked outward for inspiration, to society and human conflict. Another pupil of St. Denis, Martha Graham (1893–1991), whose New York-based company became perhaps the best known in modern dance, sought to express an inward-based passion. Many of Graham's most popular works were produced in collaboration with leading American composers, such as "Appalachian Spring" with Aaron Copland.

A significant contributing factor to the development and spread of Modern Dance in the United States in the 20th century was the establishment of Bennington College's Summer School of Dance. The program was established in 1934 and led by dancer/educator Martha Hill. Students attended classes in dance techniques, dance composition, music for dance, teaching methods, production, dance history and critical theory. The school's faculty included established dancers and choreographers such as Martha Graham, Hanya Holm, Charles Weidman and Doris Humphrey, many of whom had received their training from European Modern and Expressionist dancers. The Bennington School let American modern dancers assemble to develop a dance genre of their own identity, while at the same time established a model for University-level education programs in dance in the United States.

With clear pioneers, pupils and principles, modern dance began to emerge as a distinctly American art form to be taught and developed throughout the country and continent.

Later choreographers searched for new methods of dance composition. Merce Cunningham (1919–2009) introduced chance procedures and composition by field. Choreographers as Mark Morris (1956–) and Liz Lerman (1947–) defied the convention that dancers must be thin and young. Their belief, put into action in their hiring practices and performances, is that graceful, exciting movement is not restricted by age or body type.

== African American modern dance ==
African American modern dance blends modern dance with African and Caribbean movement (flexible torso and spine, articulated pelvis, isolation of the limbs, and polyrhythmic movement). Notable people included:

- Katherine Dunham (1909-2006) trained in ballet, founded Ballet Negre in 1936 and then the Katherine Dunham Dance Company based in Chicago. In 1945, she opened a school in New York City, teaching Katherine Dunham Technique, African and Caribbean movement integrated with ballet and modern dance.
- Pearl Primus (1919-1994), born in Trinidad, drew on African and Caribbean dances to create strong dramatic works characterized by large leaps. She often based her dances on the work of black writers and on racial issues, such as Langston Hughes's 1944 The Negro Speaks of Rivers, and Lewis Allan's 1945 Strange Fruit (1945). Her dance company developed into the Pearl Primus Dance Language Institute.
- Alvin Ailey (1931-1989) studied under Lester Horton, Bella Lewitzky, and later Martha Graham. He spent several years working in both concert and theater dance. In 1958, Ailey and a group of young African-American dancers performed as the Alvin Ailey American Dance Theater in New York. He drew upon his "blood memories" of Texas, the blues, spirituals and gospel as inspiration. His most popular and critically acclaimed work is Revelations (1960).
- Eleo Pomare (1937–2008) was born in Columbia, but moved to New York as a child, and later founded the Eleo Pomare Dance Company. With Carole Johnson, Rod Rodgers, Gus Solomon and Pearl Reynolds, he co-founded the Association of Black Choreographers, which was the predecessor to the Modern Organization for Dance Evolvement, or MODE. His work had a profound impact on many dancers and choreographers, including Indigenous Australians.
- Carole Johnson (born 1940) danced with Pomare's company, contributed to the definition of "Black Dance", and leaves a huge legacy in Australia in the form of the NAISDA Dance College and Bangarra Dance Theatre.

== See also ==
- Country dance
- Disco
- Square Dance
- Swing
- Jazz
- Tap
- Break dancing
- Modern dance
- Dance music
