= Placer Theatre Ballet =

Placer Theatre Ballet is a pre-professional youth ballet company in Placer County, California, USA, that produces two full-length ballets each season.

== Important people ==
- Shea Wing, Artistic Director Current
- Pat Colgate, Artistic Director 1999-2011

== Performances ==
- The Nutcracker, 1999
- Alice in Wonderland, 2000
- The Nutcracker, 2000
- The Nutcracker, 2001
- Festival of Great Ballets, 2002
- The Nutcracker, 2002
- Alice in Wonderland, 2003
- The Nutcracker, 2003
- Performing Arts Center Gala, 2004
- The Nutcracker, 2004
- Snow White and the Seven Dwarfs, 2005
- The Nutcracker, 2005
- Alice in Wonderland, 2006
- The Nutcracker, 2006
- Cinderella, 2007
- The Nutcracker, 2007
- Snow White and the Seven Dwarfs, 2008
- The Nutcracker, 2008
- Alice in Wonderland, 2009
- The Nutcracker, 2009
- Cinderella, 2010
- The Nutcracker, 2010
- Coppelia, 2011
- The Nutcracker, 2011
- Snow White and the Seven Dwarfs, 2012
- The Nutcracker, 2012
- Cinderella, 2013
- The Nutcracker, 2013
- Sleeping Beauty, 2014
