= Sacramento Ballet =

American performing arts organization

Sacramento Ballet is a performing arts organization in Sacramento, California. It is the largest ballet company in California's capital city.

== History ==
The Sacramento Ballet was founded in 1954 by Barbara Crockett and Deane Crockett. During Ms. Crockett's tenure as Company Director, Sacramento Ballet gained national recognition as one of the finest regional ballet companies. Through community support, the formation of the Ballet Guild, and grants from the Sacramento Metropolitan Arts Commission, California Arts Council, and the National Endowment for the Arts, the Ballet grew to become a resident company of professional dancers.

In 1986, having accomplished her goal of making Sacramento Ballet a professional company, Ms. Crockett retired as Company Director.

=== Tenure of Ron Cunningham ===
In 1988 Ron Cunningham was engaged as Artistic Director, and was joined by his wife Carinne Binda the following year. They became Co-Artistic Directors in 1991. Sacramento Ballet is known for Cunningham's world premieres including Carmina Burana, The Rite of Spring and Bolero and his classic ballets, The Nutcracker, Romeo and Juliet, and Cinderella. Sacramento audiences have experienced a vast repertoire, including works by Septime Webre, David Parsons, Kathryn Posin, Agnes de Mille, Glen Tetley, Val Caniparoli, Trey McIntyre and Twyla Tharp. During 18 seasons, Sacramento Ballet added 13 full-length ballets, 18 Balanchine masterworks, 36 Sacramento premieres, and 34 world premieres.

== Community Status and Funding ==
Since 1954, Sacramento Ballet has been a beacon of artistic excellence in the California Capital Region, delivering world-class dance performances, education, and community outreach programs. It is the region’s only Sacramento arts organization to maintain a roster of professional resident company artists. Also unique among local arts organizations, Sacramento Ballet welcomes internationally renowned leaders, dancers, and choreographers to live and create groundbreaking artistic works in Sacramento.

Sacramento Ballet is a 501(c)(3) non-profit organization, funded by ticket sales and individual donations, as well as contributions from corporate, foundation, and government entities. This vital support enables the company to present unparalleled, world-class programming that inspires and uplifts, while expanding the reach of the artform through educational and outreach initiatives.

== Recent Activities ==
Tiit Helimets was named Artistic Director of Sacramento Ballet in August 2026. Tiit is an internationally acclaimed ballet artist, choreographer, and artistic leader with a distinguished career spanning more than 27 years.

Born in Estonia and trained in the Vaganova tradition, he began his professional career with the Estonian National Ballet, where he was promoted to Principal Dancer in his first season. He went on to perform as a principal with Birmingham Royal Ballet and later with San Francisco Ballet, where he spent nearly two decades as a leading artist.

Celebrated for his refined technique, musicality, and commanding stage presence, Tiit has performed a vast repertoire of principal roles. He has also built a significant body of work as a choreographer, répétiteur, and creative leader.

Beyond the stage, Tiit has been an advocate for cultural evolution within ballet. As Co-Lead of San Francisco Ballet’s Inclusion Advisory Group, he helped guide institutional initiatives in equity, education, and inclusive programming.

Grounded in classical tradition yet driven by a forward-looking vision, Tiit Helimets continues to shape the future of ballet through artistic excellence, mentorship, and a deep belief in the transformative power of dance.

Kiera Anderson, Ed.D., became Executive Director of Sacramento Ballet in January 2026. With more than two decades of leadership experience at the intersection of arts, education, and nonprofit impact, Kiera brings an artist’s perspective to executive leadership, shaped by a career dedicated to advancing access, excellence, and sustainability in the arts.

Kiera’s career spans senior leadership roles in arts education, youth development, and community-based nonprofits, where she has led organizational growth, strategic planning, fundraising, and large-scale partnerships.

Most recently, she served as Director of Advancement for PRO Youth, where she oversaw fund development, communications, corporate partnerships, and government relations while helping scale innovative mental wellness and collective impact initiatives.

With a passion for outreach, Kiera provided operational and community engagement support with the DEA Educational Foundation, ensuring access to arts programming for thousands of youth nationwide. An educator at heart, Kiera has taught dance, theatre, and music in schools, community organizations, and studio settings, following a performing career in New York and regional theatres across the country.

Kiera holds a Bachelor of Fine Arts, a Master of Education, and a Doctorate in Leadership and Innovation. She is passionate about ensuring that ballet remains both artistically excellent and accessible, reflective of the community it serves, and positioned for long-term sustainability.

== Artists as of November 2026 ==
Sacramento Ballet Company Dancers (first year with company)

Darius Anagnos, 2024

Eduardo Cazarez, 2024

Maxence Devaux, 2023

Julia Feldman, 2011

Ugo Frediani, 2022

Florrie Geller, 2024

James Griffen, 2024

Dylan Keane, 2013

William Mattson, 2024

Wyatt McConville-McCoy, 2021

Juan Negreira, 2024

Seungkyun Park, 2024

Julia Payne, 2023

Richard Smith, 2008

Sarah Joan Smith, 2023

Mia Steedle, 2024

Hiyori Ushikubo, 2024

Isabella Velasquez, 2014

Jennifer Watembach, 2023

Ava Grace Williams, 2025

Kenzie Woodward, 2025

Myla Calhoun, 2026 (Apprentice)

Ava Dempster, 2026 (Apprentice)

Maile Fitzgerald, 2026 (Apprentice)

Hailey Rozzano-Keefe, 2025 (Apprentice)

== Artists as of May 2023 ==
- Rehearsal Directors: Stefan Calka, Elise Elliott

=== Dancers ===
Kirsten Bloom

Mesa Burdick

Ava Chatterson

Matisse D'Aloisio

Julia Feldman

Ugo Frediani

Kaori Higashiyama

Michelle Katcher

Dylan Keane

Daniel Kubr

Victor Maguad

Wyatt McConville-McCoy

Eugene Obille

Wen Na Robertson

Sarah Joan Smith

Richard Smith

Isabella Velasquez

Dominique Wendt

Enrico Hipolito

Maxence Devaux

=== Apprentices ===
Erika Patterson
Maia Lee
Julia Payne

== Artists as of August 2019 ==
=== Dancers ===
- Isaac Bates-Vinueza
- Alexander Cain Biber
- Bobby Briscoe
- Stefan Calka
- Anthony Cannarella
- Frances Chae
- Ava Chatterson
- Alexandra Cunningham
- Regina DuPont
- Julia Feldman
- Kaori Higashiyama
- Michelle Katcher
- Dylan Keane
- Richard Porter
- Shania Rasmussen
- Richard Smith
- Sally Turkel
- Isabella Velasquez
- Dominique Wendt
- Lauryn Winterhalder
- Ben Youngstone

=== Apprentices ===
- Matisse D'Aloisio
- Kristoffer Reyes
- Wen Na Robertson

== Artists as of August 2015 ==
=== Dancers ===
- Alexander Cain Biber
- Lauren Breen
- Stefan Calka
- Ava Chatterson
- Alexandra Cunningham
- Julia Feldman
- Kaori Higashiyama
- Iver Johnson
- Dylan Keane
- Larissa Kogut
- Katie Miller
- Christopher B. Nachtrab
- Richard Porter
- Karina Hagemeyer
- Maggie Rupp
- Richard Smith
- Evelyn Turner
- Rex Wheeler
- John Whisler
- Lauryn Winterhalder

=== Apprentices ===
- Anthony Cannarella
- Colleen Kerwin
- Shania Rasmussen
- Isabella Velasquez
- Laura Whitby

=== Trainees ===
- Brittney Almendariz
- Audrey Mathias
- Emily Tan
- Solana Tanabe

== Performances ==
=== 2026-2027 Season ===
==== Long and Winding Road ====
===== The SOFIA, October 23 – 25 =====
George Balanchine's timeless The Four Temperaments, Julia Feldman's kaleidoscopic Hearts, and Stanton Welch's The Long and Winding Road

==== Nutcracker ====
===== SAFE Credit Union Performing Arts Center, December 12 – 24 =====
When Clara receives a mysterious nutcracker on Christmas Eve, she is swept into a world of magic, wonder, and dazzling adventure.

==== Wild Sweet Love ====
===== The SOFIA, March 5 – 7, 2027 =====
Trey McIntyre's playful Wild Sweet Love, the thrilling return of the late Ron Cunningham's powerful Boléro, and a stunning new classical work by Artistic Director Tiit Helimets.

==== Giselle ====
===== SAFE Credit Union Performing Arts Center, April 9 – 11, 2027 =====
A story of tragic heartbreak, ethereal transformation, and the healing power of love, staged by Sacramento Ballet’s Artistic Director Tiit Helimets.

==== Beer & Ballet ====
===== The SOFIA, May 27 – 30, 2027 =====
Company dancers step off the stage and into the choreographer's role, creating original works that reveal their artistic voices in a way no other program can.

=== 2008-2009 (Season 54) ===
- Alice in Wonderland - October 23–26, 2008
- The Nutcracker - December 6–23, 2008
- Noches Calientes - February 12–15, 2009
- Icons & Innovators - March 26–29, 2009
- Beer & Ballet - April–May, 2009
- Modern Masters - May 22–24, 2009

=== 2007-2008 (Season 53) ===
- A Woman's Journey: The Tamsen Donner Story - October 25–28, 2007
- The Nutcracker - December 7–23, 2007
- A Streetcar Named Desire - February 7–10, 2008
- The Sleeping Beauty - March 20–22, 2008
- A Celebration of Ron Cunningham's 20th Anniversary - April 25, 2008
- Modern Masters - April 26-May 4, 2008
- Beer & Ballet - May 7–17, 2008

=== 2006-2007 (Season 52) ===
- Where The Wild Things Are - October 26–29, 2006
- The Nutty Nutcracker - December 2, 2006
- The Nutcracker - December 8–23, 2006
- The Taming of the Shrew- February 8–11, 2007
- Nine Sinatra Songs - March 22–25, 2007
- Beer & Ballet - February 24 - April 6, 2007
- Tour to China - May 1–13, 2007

=== 2005-2006 (Season 51) ===
- Dracula - October 27–30, 2005
- The Nutcracker - December 10–24, 2005
- Carmina Burana - February 9–12, 2006
- Scheherezade - March 30-April 2, 2006
- Modern Masters - April 28-May 7, 2006
- Beer & Ballet

=== 2004-2005 (Season 50) ===
- Dracula - October 28–31, 2004
- The Nutcracker - December 10–24, 2004
- Romeo and Juliet - February 10–13, 2005
- The Firebird - March 24–27, 2005
- Modern Masters - May 5–8, 2005
- Beer & Ballet
