= Kilian O'Callaghan =

`Irish ballet dancer, teacher and choreographer, and academic administrator

- Born: 1963 (age 62–63); Monkstown, County Cork, Ireland
- Citizenship: Irish
- Education: St. Francis College Rochestown, Moriarty School of Dance, Royal Ballet School
- Occupations: ballet choreographer, ballet dancer, education administrator
- Years active: 1975 (CBC) - present
- Career
- Current group: Irish National Youth Ballet
- Former groups: Cork Ballet Company, Irish National Ballet, Royal Ballet School, The Scottish Ballet, West Australian Ballet, Royal New Zealand Ballet, Ballet Ireland

Kilian O'Callaghan (born 1963) is a male ballet dancer, choreographer and education administrator from Monkstown, County Cork, Ireland. One of the few Irish male students of the Royal Ballet School, he is a former member of the Scottish Ballet, and a former Principal Dancer with the Royal New Zealand Ballet. He teaches and choreographs, including with the Irish National Youth Ballet, and works as a course and quality officer for the National College of Art and Design in Dublin.

== Early life ==
O'Callaghan grew up in Monkstown, a village near the city of Cork, Ireland, and attended secondary school at St Francis College Rochestown. He started to study Irish dancing at age 4, and ballet at about age 7.

== Studies and career ==
=== Early stages and the Royal Ballet School ===
O'Callaghan studied ballet with the Moriarty School of Dance, founded by Joan Denise Moriarty. Starting as a young dancer, he also performed with the Cork Ballet Company from around 12 years of age, in Coppélia, The Sleeping Beauty, La Sylphide, Petrouchka, and other productions, and with members of the Irish National Ballet Company. At the age of 17 he successfully auditioned for a place at the Royal Ballet School, the first of as few as five Irish male dancers to so qualify as of 2018. He won a bursary from the Arts Council of Ireland to support his first and second year at the RBS, the second such bursary after Katherine Lewis in 1978, and a grant from Tony O'Reilly's Fitzwilton Trust towards his second year.

=== Professional ballet companies ===
In 1982 O'Callaghan joined the Scottish Ballet, touring the UK and continental Europe, Turkey, Hong Kong, Western Australia, and South Carolina, and performing in a range of classic ballets, including Peter Darrell's Carmen, Cinderella, The Nutcracker, Tales of Hoffmann and Giselle, and in Cranko's Romeo and Juliet, and Bournonville's La Sylphide, as well as La Ventana (Pas de trois), and Napoli (Pas de six, Ballabile). He moved to the West Australian Ballet in 1986, and then in 1988 to the Royal New Zealand Ballet as Principal Dancer. Touring New Zealand, Australia, the US and Europe, he performed in a wide range of roles, including Hamlet (choreography by Jonathan Taylor) in the title role, Mozart in Wolfgang Amadeus (Gray Veredon), the Prince in The Nutcracker and in Cinderella (Jack Carter), as Albrecht in Giselle, as James and Gurn in La Sylphide (Bournonville), and as Tybalt in Romeo and Juliet (Malcolm Burn). He also performed leading roles in Pineapple Poll (Cranko), The Four Temperaments (Balanchine), Troy Game (Robert North), Les Sylphides (Fokine), Oscar Wilde in The Season of Sorrow (Garth Welch), and as Silvio in A Servant of Two Masters (Gray Veredon). He also appeared in a leading role in the 1990 television production of the newly written three-act ballet Jean about Jean Batten.

O'Callaghan choreographed two musicals for Stagecraft Theatre in Wellington NZ, and La Traviata for the New Zealand Opera.

=== Career shift ===
Retiring from full-time dancing, O'Callaghan worked 1995–1996 as a real estate sales consultant in Wellington NZ. From 1997 to 1998 he was classical tutor at the New Zealand School of Dance, and was Hon. Secretary of the New Zealand Association of Dance Teachers for several years.

He commenced study in February 1997 at Massey University at Wellington, graduating with a B.Ed. in 2000.

In 2001, he was engaged by Ballet Ireland as Ballet Master for a tour of UK and Ireland with The Nutcracker, in which he also performed as the father. Also in 2001, he staged excerpts from Swan Lake with Wakatu Dance Theatre, followed by Sleeping Beauty in 2003.

From 2000 to 2004, O'Callaghan worked as a curriculum developer for Nelson Marlborough Institute of Technology, then from 2004 as course approval and accreditation advisor with the New Zealand Qualifications Authority, becoming national Course Approvals Manager, for over 900 private colleges, in 2006.

=== Return to Ireland ===
He returned to Ireland in 2008. He initially worked in quality assurance and then programme management with the Institute of Banking, a recognised college of University College Dublin (UCD), then moved to start 2017 at another recognised college of UCD, the National College of Art and Design, in the Office of Academic Affairs, looking at course accreditation and quality and other aspects of academic and campus life.

O'Callaghan continues to choreograph and teach, including with the Irish National Youth Ballet, but also with Youth Ballet West, and to choreograph productions; a ballet he choreographed in 2015, Moving On, remains in production also as of 2019.

In 2015, he produced a full-length edition of The Nutcracker for the Irish National Youth Ballet, which was performed in the Pavilion Theatre, Dun Laoghaire that year, and in 2016-2017 and 2017–2018, and in 2018 he choreographed and produced a new production of Cinderella for the company. In 2019, O'Callaghan's Nutcracker was due to be performed in Dun Laoghaire.

He is a member of Dance Ireland, and was on the board of Ballet Ireland from 2010 to 2016.
