= Leigh Alderson =

Northern Irish ballet dancer

- Born: 5 December 1986 (age 38); Portadown, Northern Ireland
- Occupation(s): Film, Theatre, Performer
- Years active: 1998 – present
- Career
- Current group: Cork City Ballet
- Former groups: Ballet companies
- Dances: ballet
- Website: leighalderson.weebly.com

Leigh Alderson (born 1986) is a male ballet dancer, model and actor from Portadown, Northern Ireland.

Alderson trained at The Royal Ballet School performing in Rudi van Dantzig's Four Last Songs in Toronto and Stuttgart before graduating in 2006. He joined Scottish Ballet dancing works by Ashley Page, Forsythe and Trisha Brown and Pastor and works by Richard Wherlock with New English Contemporary Ballet, later joining Atlantic Ballet Theatre of Canada and guesting with Cork City Ballet. With Les Grands Ballets Canadiens he performed in works by Stijn Celis, Stephan Thoss, The Snake in Didy Veldman's Petit Prince, Jiří Kylián's [Kaguyahime] and The Prince in Mats Ek's Sleeping Beauty.

Film and TV work has included the Canadian horror film Undress Me (2017), StreetDance 3D (2010), Angel (2009), the BBC documentary series Lost to Dance (1998) and God Given Gift (2005/07).

Awards include Royal Ballet School Achievement Award (2005 & 2006) Lynne Seymour Award for Most Expressive Dancer (2004), The NJL Choreographic Development Award (2005) and The Ulster Tatler Arts Personality of the Year Award (2009 & 2010).

== Documentaries, film and TV ==
The BBC produced three documentary films about him. Lost To Dance was broadcast in October 1998, A God Given Gift in September 2005 and the third, also called A God Given Gift, in December 2007. All were directed and produced by the documentary film maker Claire DeLargy. The 2007 biography of Frederic Franklin notes Franklin's involvement with Alderson and his involvement in Alderson's 2005 and 2007 BBC documentaries.

Alderson began filming the independent film Angel in June 2009, co-starring the ballet dancer Kyle Davey. The film uses the score of the Scottish singer, Jerry Burns and is directed by David Council. The film had its premiere screening in The Market Place Theatre at The Stars of the Arts Gala 2010 on 19 June. An official trailer was released in July for a limited time to mark its impending release onto iTunes worldwide. It was subsequently shown at the Festival International du Court Métrage in Clermont-Ferrand and at the 10th Annual Two Short Nights Film Festival.

In July 2009, it was announced that Alderson would be attached as a featured dancer in Vertigo Films' StreetDance 3D that commenced shooting in mid-August 2009 to be released in May 2010. The film subsequently became #1 at the UK box office.

Alderson was a featured artist on BBC's arts and culture series Art Space, in the sixth and final episode of series one which was televised on Wednesday 2 June 2010 on BBC1.

== Flight of Freedom ==
Flight of Freedom was the product of a collaborative photo-shoot between Alderson and Karin Pritzel, a photographer from Dublin. The photo first came to media attention in New York when the fashion designer Malan Breton chose it to be his official muse for his 2010 spring collection. It was then commissioned as a large scale art piece which was auctioned at The NCAD gallery in Dublin, which was organised by Fairley Pilaro in aid Of Operation Smile, a charity that raises money for children to have cleft palate operations in poor and underdeveloped countries. The picture was again auctioned for the Stars of the Arts Gala in aid of the Haiti Appeal. In 2011, it was selected to be included in a book combining art and famous inspiring quotes. The book, Quoted Moments, was launched in July 2011 in association with the Irish Cancer Society.

== Books and published material ==
In 2007, Leslie Norton published a biography of Frederic Franklin which documented Franklin's involvement with Alderson and his 2005 and 2007 BBC documentaries.

In 2009, while still a dancer with New English Contemporary Ballet, Alderson appeared in Jim Rowbothams' photography book Strictly Ballet. In 2010, the French author Sébastien Simoni dedicated his horror novel, Labyrinthik to Alderson.

== Awards and recognition ==
Year	Award	Category	Result
2004	The Lynne Seymour Award	Most Expressive Dancer	Won
2005	The NJL Sponsored Choreographic Development Award	Choreographic Development	Won
2005	The Royal Ballet School Achievement Award	N/A	Won
2006	The Royal Ballet School Achievement Award	N/A	Won
2009	Ulster Tatler – People of the Year Awards 2009	Arts Personality of the Year 2009	Nominated
2010	Ulster Tatler – People of the Year Awards 2010	Arts Personality of the Year 2010	Nominated

== TV, film and documentary ==
Year	Title	Production	Style	Role
1998	Lost To Dance	BBC	Documentary film	Featured artist
2005	A God Given Gift	BBC	Documentary film	Featured artist
2007	A God Given Gift 2	BBC	Documentary film	Featured artist
2009	Angel	Concept&Graph Films	Independent short film	Lead performer
2010	StreetDance 3D	Vertigo Films	Feature film	Featured dancer
2010	Art Space	BBC	Television programme	Featured star profile
2011	Atlantic Ballet Theatre of Canada Presents Ghosts of Violence	Valkaline Productions	Independent ballet film	Male lead/ HE
2017	Undress Me		Independent short	Eric (lead)
2018	Monachopsis	Summerhouse Films	Feature film	Unicorn (supporting)
2018	Grass Is Always Greener		Independent short	Harry Whitman (lead)
2018	Untitled future project	Karin Pritzel Productions	Short art film	Lead performer

== Ballet companies ==
Ballet company	Years active	Country	Role
The Royal Ballet	2005–2006	London	Cover, extra, dancer
Scottish Ballet	2006–2008	Scotland	Corps de ballet
Cork City Ballet	2008–present	Ireland	Guest artist
New English Contemporary Ballet	2009	England	Soloist dancer
Atlantic Ballet Theatre of Canada	2010–2013	Canada	Soloist dancer
Les Grands Ballets Canadiens	2013–2017	Canada	Demi-soloist
Ballet Ireland	2017–2018	Ireland	Ballet dancer
New Adventures	2018–2019	London	Performer

== Music ==
Title	Release date	EP/Single	Format
Boy	25 June 2013	Album	iTunes/Amazon/Sony Music LTD
I Felt Space Or So I Thought	18 August 2011	Single	iTunes Worldwide (digital)/ Physical CD
