= Martin Yates =

British conductor

Martin Yates (born in London) is a British conductor. After attending Kimbolton School, he studied at the Royal College of Music and Trinity College of Music, London, where his teachers included Bernard Keeffe (conducting), Richard Arnell (composition), Ian Lake, Jakob Kaletsky and Alan Rowlands (piano), and Douglas Moore and John Burden (French horn). He is currently principal guest conductor of Scottish Ballet.

== Conductor ==
He made his conducting debut with Israel National Opera in Carmen, and appeared with them as guest conductor for two seasons, where he conducted Tosca, Madama Butterfly, La bohème and La traviata. He came to UK notice making his Edinburgh Festival debut in 1988 with Leonard Bernstein's On The Town, and thereafter conducted several major London musicals, including The Phantom of the Opera (Her Majesty's Theatre), Miss Saigon (Theatre Royal, Drury Lane), Carousel (Shaftesbury Theatre) and Sunset Boulevard (Adelphi Theatre). In 1995 he crossed back to mainstream classical music and has since appeared regularly at several major opera houses including Paris, Vienna, Prague, Dresden, Copenhagen, Helsinki, Stockholm, Oslo, Naples, Rome, Bratislava, Tokyo and the Royal Opera House, Covent Garden.

He conducts many major symphony orchestras, including the Staatskapelle Dresden, Gothenburg Symphony, Swedish Chamber Orchestra, Royal Scottish National Orchestra, Tonhalle Orchestra, Royal Stockholm Philharmonic, Royal Liverpool Philharmonic, City of Birmingham Symphony Orchestra, and the Royal Philharmonic Orchestra. He is a regular conductor of the BBC Concert Orchestra (conducting the Proms in the Park in London for three years running) and has made notable recordings of composer Richard Arnell's work as well as recordings by other neglected British composers. For three years running he conducted the Nobel Peace Prize Concert in Oslo, he regularly conducts the Royal Ballet, both at Covent Garden and on their international tours and is annually the conductor of the opening concert of the English Music Festival with the BBC Concert Orchestra.

From 1994 to 1999, he was the principal conductor of the National Symphony Orchestra in London and from 2010 to 2014 he was the principal conductor of the Symphony Orchestra of the Cambridge University Music Society.

Martin Yates has made over 100 recordings, including (for Dutton Epoch) the world premier recordings of the complete symphonies, ballets and concertos of Richard Arnell, John Joubert's Symphony 2; Symphonies 3 & 4, Sinfonietta 1 & Piano Concerto 2 by Stanley Bate, Thomas Dunhill (Symphony in A), Erik Chisholm (Symphony No. 2), Peter Crossley-Holland (Symphony in D), String Orchestra music by Arnold Bax, Stephen Dodgson and Richard Arnell, Orchestral Songs by John Ireland, Arnold Bax and others, also Piano Concertos (with pianist Victor Sangiorgio) by Stanley Bate, Benjamin Godard and Franz Reizenstein and with pianist Peter Donohoe piano concertos by Malcolm Arnold, Alan Bush and Cyril Scott and with pianist Martin Roscoe the complete piano and orchestra works by Charles-Marie Widor.

He has conducted several recordings of music by Ralph Vaughan Williams including Symphony 5, Concerto for Two Pianos, premier recordings of Serenade for small orchestra, Bucolic Suite, The Blue Bird & The Fat Knight, the entire scores of Scott of the Antarctic and 49th Parallel and the first modern recording of A London Symphony in its second version (1920). During the 1990s he made many recordings of complete musicals for TER, including Brigadoon, The Phantom of the Opera, Jesus Christ Superstar, Sweet Charity, Stop the World I Want to Get Off, The Fantasticks and Seven Brides for Seven Brothers. He conducted the highly regarded Royal National Theatre production of Carousel in London's West End and made the London cast recording.

== Composer ==
Yates's music for flute and piano has been recorded by flautist Anna Noakes. His flute sonata is subtitled Fire Island, but this is to be taken metaphysically and is not a reference to Fire Island, New York State.

In 2015, he was commissioned by the Royal Ballet to write the score for Elizabeth, a ballet by Will Tuckett to a text by Alasdair Middleton. He wrote a musical with Dudley Stevens (The Soap Opera, 1986), seen briefly at the Piccadilly Theatre, London and another musical with Steve Devereaux (Wuthering Heights).

== Orchestrator ==
In 2010, he completed and orchestrated Ernest John Moeran's Symphony No.2 (from sketches), which he recorded with the RSNO on Dutton Epoch in 2011. This recording was awarded Recording of the Year by Musicweb International. The first public performance of the Symphony was given by Yates and the BBC Concert Orchestra at the English Music Festival in June 2012. A subsequent performance took place with Yates conducting the Brighton Philharmonic Orchestra in December 2012.

Yates completed Edward Elgar's Pageant of Empire, recorded by Yates conducting baritone Roderick Williams, and realised and completed Richard Arnell's Symphony No.7 (Mandela), recorded by Yates and the RSNO. His orchestration of Sarnia – an Island Sequence for Orchestra by John Ireland has recently been recorded by the RSNO and released on Dutton Epoch.

In 2015, he completed and orchestrated Fantasia for Orchestra, the unfinished work by George Butterworth, and gave the world premiere with the BBC Concert Orchestra at the 2015 English Music Festival. His subsequent completions and orchestrations include Ralph Vaughan Williams The Fat Knight, The Blue Bird, Christmas Overture and the Little March Suite and Edward Elgar The Spanish Lady Symphonic Suite. His orchestration for the Kenneth MacMillan Ballet Manon was made for the Royal Ballet in 2011 and is now used throughout the world and his orchestration of the Carlos Acosta Ballet Don Quixote was made for the Royal Ballet and premiered in September 2013. In 2022 he orchestrated the ballet The Scandal at Mayerling for the new revised production of the Kenneth MacMillan classic ballet Mayerling for Scottish Ballet.

In 2015, he orchestrated and arranged two ballet versions of Carmen; one in three acts for Liam Scarlett for Norwegian National Ballet and one in one act for Carlos Acosta for the Royal Ballet. For Liam Scarlett he has also arranged and orchestrated The Queen of Spades (Tchaikovsky) for the Royal Danish Ballet in 2018 and Dangerous Liaisons (Saint-Saens) for the Queensland Ballet in 2019. For Gregory Dean he arranged and orchestrated the ballet Blixen Royal Danish Ballet and for Will Tuckett he arranged and orchestrated the ballet The Tragedy of Macbeth National Ballet of Japan 2023.

In 2012, he completed the early Piano Concerto and completed and revised the early Cello Concerto both by Cyril Scott. He recorded these for Dutton Epoch with Peter Donohoe (piano) and Raphael Wallfisch (cello) with the BBC.
