= Elaine McDonald =

Scottish ballerina

- Born: 2 May 1943
- Died: 8 December 2018
- Known for: ballet dancer
- Awards: OBE

Elaine Maria McDonald (2 May 1943 – 8 December 2018) was a pioneer ballerina in Scotland.

== Early life ==
McDonald was born in Scarborough, Yorkshire. When she was 11, she won a competition set up by the Royal Academy of Dance in London, to study ballet in Leeds. She subsequently gained a place at the Royal Ballet School.

== Career ==
She first worked in the London Ballet Company, and then with the Western Theatre Ballet, based in Bristol. This company had been established by choreographer Peter Darrell. Darrell was invited to relocate his company in 1969 to Glasgow in order to establish a national ballet company in Scotland. McDonald also moved to Glasgow at this time, and was promoted from Soloist to Principal.

== Awards and honours ==
McDonald was made an OBE in 1983 for services to dance.

== Court Case ==
McDonald had a stroke in 1999, which left her disabled and using a wheelchair as well as needing regular home care. In 2014 she took her local council, Kensington and Chelsea Council, to court in order to challenge its decision not to provide an overnight carer to assist her. She lost her case at the European Court of Human Rights. The ruling was seen as victory as the court stated failing to consider a person's dignity could be considered a breach of human rights, and linked dignity to Article 8 of the European Convention on Human Rights.
