= Richard Arnell =

English composer (1917–2009)

Richard Anthony Sayer Arnell
- Born: 15 September 1917
- Died: 10 April 2009 (aged 91)

Arnell in 1954.

Richard Anthony Sayer Arnell (15 September 1917 – 10 April 2009) was an English composer of classical music. Arnell composed in all the established genres for the concert stage, and his list of works includes six completed symphonies and six string quartets. At the Trinity College of Music, he "promoted a pioneering interest in film scores and electronic music" and jazz.

== Life and career ==
Arnell was born in Hampstead, London, the son of Hélène Marie (Scherf) and Richard Sayer Arnell. In contrast to his grandfather, who played the violin in the Hastings Municipal Orchestra, his father was the architect and builder of the 28-acre Kingsway and Aldwych project, which was completed in 1905. Arnell studied at the Royal College of Music in London from 1935 to 1939, and was taught there by John Ireland (composition) and John Arthur St. Oswald Dykes (piano). He was awarded the Farrar Prize for composition during his final year at the college. At the outset of the Second World War, attending the New York World Fair, Arnell (along with other English composers, e.g. Arthur Bliss) was stranded in New York, and stayed on until 1947, thereby finding himself in the position of having an established reputation in the US, but remaining relatively little known in his homeland. During his American sojourn, Arnell was the Music Supervisor for the BBC in North America, and was commissioned to compose (to a text by Stephen Spender) a cantata, The War God, in celebration of the opening of the United Nations, as well as a fanfare to greet Winston Churchill's arrival in New York.

His music has been championed by Thomas Beecham, Leopold Stokowski and Bernard Herrmann, among others and more recently by Warren Cohen and Martin Yates (one of his composition students at Trinity). With the exception of a break from 1967 to 1970 to act as Visiting Fulbright Professor at Bowdoin College, Maine, from 1967 to 1968 (in an exchange with Elliott Schwartz), and at Hofstra University, New York, from 1968 to 1970, he taught at Trinity College of Music in London between 1947 and 1987, where his students included Peter Tahourdin (1949–52), electronic composer David Hewson, who worked with him on films including Dilemma (1981), Doctor in the Sky (1984), Toulouse-Lautrec (1986), and The Light of the World (1989), was one of his pupils.

Arnell composed the music for The Land (1942), a 45-minute documentary film directed by Robert J. Flaherty for the US Department of Agriculture. He was also commissioned by the Ford Motor Company to compose a symphonic suite inspired by the workers in the factory at Dagenham. The resulting work accompanies a film entitled Opus 65. Arnell established and headed the Music Department at the London International Film School until his retirement in the late 1980s. Mention must also be made of Arnell's extraordinary support and concern for a large number of musicians and artists both young and old as can be seen in his friendship and support for the painter Mark Rothko.

He was also known for his major works for the ballet as can be seen in his collaborations with choreographers of the stature of George Balanchine, John Cranko and Frederick Ashton. His many ballets have been successfully staged in both New York and London. His score for Punch and the Child was recorded by Sir Thomas Beecham with the Royal Philharmonic Orchestra, a recording which has seldom been out of the catalogue.

All seven of Arnell's numbered symphonies together with the Sinfonia Quasi Variazioni, the Piano Concerto (soloist David Owen Norris), the two Violin Concertos (soloist Lorraine MacAslan), Lord Byron: a Symphonic Portrait, Robert Flaherty Impression, Prelude The Black Mountain and the early Overture The New Age, received their world premiere recordings by conductor Martin Yates and the Royal Scottish National Orchestra between 2005 and 2008. The premiere recordings of the ballets The Angels, Harlequin in April and The Great Detective, together with Punch and the Child, were recorded by Martin Yates and the BBC Concert Orchestra in 2008–09.

Arnell had left sketches for a Seventh Symphony, dedicated to Nelson Mandela, at the time of his death, and it has since been realised and completed by Martin Yates. It was recorded in the summer of 2010 by Yates and the RSNO and was issued by Dutton Epoch. The same label has also issued recordings of the rest of the Symphonies, the String Quartets (played by the Tippett Quartet), and works for chamber orchestra.

Arnell is acknowledged as being one of the most masterly orchestrators of the twentieth century, Sir Thomas Beecham describing him as the best orchestrator since Berlioz.

Some of his manuscripts are in the collection of the University of California, Santa Barbara library.

== Selected works ==
=== Orchestral works ===
- Sinfonia for Orchestra (1938)
- Sinfonia for Strings (1939)
- Classical Variations (string orchestra), Op. 1 (1939)
- Overture, The New Age, Op. 2 (1939)
- Divertimento No.1, for piano and chamber orchestra, Op. 5 (1939)
- Overture, 1940, Op. 6 (1940)
- Divertimento No.2, for chamber orchestra, Op. 7 (1940)
- Violin Concerto (No. 1) in one movement, Op. 9 (1940)
- Sinfonia Quasi Variazioni, Op. 13 (1941)
- Fantasia for Orchestra, Op. 17 (1941)
- Symphonic Suite – Six Episodes for Orchestra, Op. 27 (1941)
- Symphony No. 1, Op. 31 (1943)
- Symphony No. 2, Op. 33 Rufus (1942/44)
- Symphony No. 3, Op. 40 (1944–45)
- Canzona and Capriccio for Violin and Strings, Op. 37 (1945)
- Piano Concerto No. 1, Op.44 (1946)
- Prelude The Black Mountain, Op. 46 (1946)
- Abstract Forms (string orchestra), Op. 50 (1947)
- Concerto for Harpsichord and Chamber Orchestra, Op. 51 (1947)
- Symphony No. 4, Op. 52 (1948)
- Lord Byron – a Symphonic Portrait, Op. 67 (1952)
- Concerto Capriccioso for Violin and Small Orchestra (No. 2), Op.70 (1954)
- Symphony No. 5, Op. 77 (1955)
- Landscapes and Figures, Op. 78 (1956)
- Robert Flaherty – Impression, Op. 87 (1958)
- Divertimento Concertante for Cello and String Orchestra, Op. 90 (1958)
- Sections, for Piano and Orchestra, Op. 110 (1967)
- Overture, The Food of Love, Op. 112 (1968)
- Ode to Beecham (with narrator), Op. 154 (1986)
- Symphony No. 6, Op. 171 The Anvil (1992–94)
- Symphony No. 7, Op. 201 Mandela (1996)

=== Chamber works ===
- String Quartet No. 1, Op. 4 (1939)
- String Quartet No. 2, Op. 14 (1941)
- Oboe Quintet, Op. 38 (1944)
- String Quartet No. 3, Op. 41 (1945)
- Cassation for wind quintet, Op. 45 (1945)
- Piano Trio, Op. 47 (1946)
- Violin Sonata No. 2, Op. 55
- Serenade for ten wind instruments and double bass, Op. 57 (1949)
- String Quintet, Op. 60 (1950)
- Sonatina for piano duet, Op. 61
- String Quartet No. 4, Op. 62 (1950)
- Brass Quintet, Op. 93
- String Quartet No. 5, Op. 99 (1962)
- String Quartet No. 6, Op. 170 (1994)
- Piano Quartet
- RVW's Almanac (Clarinet Quartet)
- Variations on an American Theme for violin and piano
- Horn Quartet

=== Solo works ===
- 2 piano sonatas
- 2 organ sonatas
- Sonatina for piano duet, Op 61 (1950)
- Variations on Eine Feste Burg for Organ
- unaccompanied pieces for violin, viola and cello
- numerous sets of variations for piano solo

=== Stage works ===
- Punch and the Child (ballet)
- Harlequin in April (ballet, 1951)
- The Great Detective (ballet)
- The Angels (ballet)
- Moonflowers (chamber opera)
- Love in Transit (chamber opera)
- The Petrified Princess (puppet opera)

=== Vocal/choral works ===
- Cantata The War God, for soprano, chorus and orchestra, Op. 36 (1945)
- Ode to the West Wind, for soprano and orchestra, Op. 59 (1949)
- Six Lawrence Songs
- Con Amore
- Xanadu
- Cretaceous Intermission
- Five Emily Songs

=== Mixed media (electric/acoustic) works ===
- I Think of all Soft Limbs
- Nocturne: Prague
- Astronaut

=== Film scores ===
- The Land
- Opus 65
- The Visit (1964)
- The Third Secret (1964)
- Topsail Schooner
- The Man Outside (1967)
- Bequest to a Village
- Stained Glass
- The Black Panther (1977) (with David Hewson)
- The Antagonist (with David Hewson)
- Dilemma (with David Hewson)
- Toulouse-Lautrec (with David Hewson)
- Doctor in the Sky (with David Hewson)
- We Are Many (with David Hewson)
- The Light of the World (with David Hewson)
