= National performing arts companies of Scotland =

Scotland's national performing arts companies are directly funded by the Scottish Government. In the country's performing arts circles, they are often referred to as the Big Five.

- Scottish Ballet
- Scottish Opera
- Royal Scottish National Orchestra
- Scottish Chamber Orchestra
- National Theatre of Scotland
