= Sophie Martin =

French ballet dancer

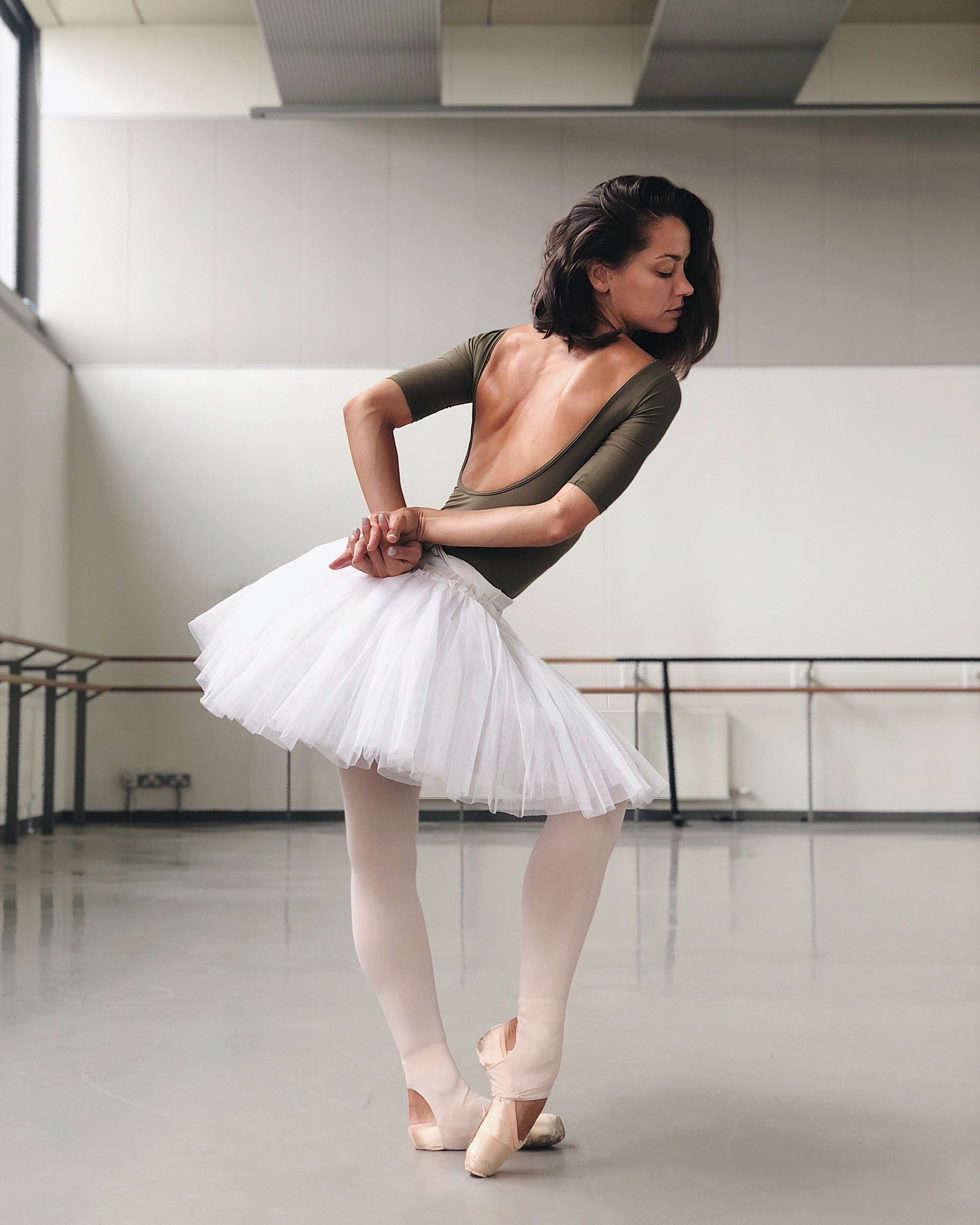
- Born: Sophie Christine Martin; December 1984 (age 40); Cherbourg, France
- Education: Conservatoire de Paris
- Occupation: Dancer
- Years active: 2003-present
- Career
- Current group: Ballett Am Rhein
- Former groups: Badisches Staatsballett Karlsruhe, Scottish Ballet

Sophie Christine Martin (born 1984) is a French ballet dancer. She was a principal dancer with the Scottish Ballet between 2008 and 2022, before joining the Badisches Staatsballett Karlsruhe in the 2022/23 season. Martin is currently a dancer with Ballett Am Rhein, in Düsseldorf.

== Early life ==
Sophie Martin was born in Cherbourg, France. As a teenager she moved to Paris and started her vocational training at the Conservatoire national supérieur de musique et de danse de Paris.

== Career ==
Martin joined the Scottish Ballet in 2003 under the directorship of Ashley Page. She was promoted to coryphée in 2005, soloist in 2006 and principal in 2008. In 2014 she performed at the XX Commonwealth Games opening ceremony and at the Ryder Cup Gala Concert in Glasgow.

In September 2022 Martin joined the Badisches Staatsballett Karlsruhe in Germany in the 2022/23 season.

== Selected repertoire ==
Martin's repertoire with the Scottish Ballet includes:

- Agon
- Alice (Alice, Queen of Hearts)
- Apollo
- Carmen (Carmen)
- Cinderella (Cinderella, Short Stepsister)
- The Crucible (Abigail Williams, Elizabeth Proctor)
- Elite Syncopations
- The Fairy's Kiss (The Fairy)
- The Four Tempteraments
- Highland Fling
- In Light and Shadow
- The Nutcracker (Sugar Plum Fairy, Marie)
- The Rite of Spring (Faith / Death)
- Romeo & Juliet (Juliet)
- Rubies (Lead couple)
- Scènes de Ballet
- The Sleeping Beauty (Aurora, Cinderella)
- A Streetcar Named Desire (Stella)
- Mayerling (Mary Vetsera)
- Swan Lake (Odette/Odile)

Martin's repertoire with Badisches Staatsballett Karlsruhe:

- Giselle (Giselle)

== Awards ==
- The Herald Scottish Culture Awards, Outstanding Dance Performer 2019
- Sunday Herald Culture Awards, Best Dance Performer 2016
- Critic’s Circle National Dance Awards, Outstanding Female Performance (Classical) 2011
- Number 20 in The List magazine’s Hot 100 poll of influential figures in Scottish culture in December 2008
