= Transition House Association of Nova Scotia =

Canadian organization

- Abbreviation: THANS
- Formation: 1989
- Type: Voluntary association
- Legal status: Association
- Purpose: To oppose violence against women
- Location: Halifax, Nova Scotia, Canada
- Region served: Nova Scotia
- Official language: English
- Provincial Coordinator: Ann de Ste Croix
- Website: thans.ca

The Transition House Association of Nova Scotia (abbreviated THANS) is a Halifax, Nova Scotia, Canada-based organisation that runs women's shelters. THANS was founded in 1989.

THANS organises an annual purple ribbon awareness campaign in memory of the École Polytechnique massacre. THANS conducted interviews with 34 physically abused women who subsequently sought resolution through family law mediation. In 2000, THANS released a report based on these interviews, stating that most of the women would not recommend legal mediation to other abused women. In 2008, THANS supported Bill 81, which they hoped would become the Domestic Violence Elimination Act, but Minister of Justice Cecil Clarke chose not to call the bill for a third reading. In 2009, Darrell Dexter of the New Democratic Party identified THANS in his promise to increase government funding of halfway houses in Nova Scotia. In 2012, THANS partnered with the World YWCA, Family SOS, Silent Witness Nova Scotia, and Leave Out Violence to host the Atlantic Ballet Theatre of Canada's Ghosts of Violence, a ballet about domestic violence, in Halifax.

Ann de Ste Croix is THANS' Provincial Coordinator.
