= Atlantic Ballet Theatre of Canada =

Ballet company

Coordinates: 46.087906°N 64.780798°W

The Atlantic Ballet Theatre of Canada is a professional award-winning touring ballet company based in Moncton, New Brunswick. Founded in 2002 by Susan Chalmers-Gauvin, CEO, and Artistic Director Igor Dobrovolskiy, Ballet-théâtre atlantique du Canada/ The Atlantic Ballet Theatre Of Canada presents a diverse collection of original full-length narrative ballets and short works which explore contemporary themes within the classical genre. Each work is conceived and choreographed by Dobrovolskiy.

Ballet-théâtre atlantique du Canada/ The Atlantic Ballet Theatre of Canada, is Atlantic Canada's only professional ballet company, and the artists of the Company are classically trained soloists from Canada and around the world.

Dobrovolskiy is a graduate of the Kyiv State Ballet Academy and earned a Bachelor of Fine Arts in pedagogy of ballet dance and choreography from the Kyiv National University of the Arts. He began his professional dance career with the State Theatre of Opera and Ballet for Children and Youth in Kyiv, Ukraine. His vocation has taken him across Europe, to Ecuador and finally to the Atlantic Ballet Theatre of Canada.

ABTC's/ BTAC's world premiere was held at the Capitol Theater in Moncton, it was a rendition of Figaro. The Company serves the four eastern provinces of Canada and is the only dance company in Canada with a four Province home constituency: New Brunswick, Prince Edward Island, Nova Scotia and Newfoundland and Labrador and is a major cultural institution for its home region. They have also played many national and international shows touring to United States of America, Germany, France and around Europe. They began their 'InTENse' tour at the beginning of 2011 in celebration of their 10th anniversary. In Tense is a show case for the Company and also an opportunity for Company artists to create. Dancers who have contributed and choreographed for Intense include: Leigh Alderson, Kyle Davey and Janie Richard.

== The Beethoven Festival ==
In 2010 the company were asked to premier their new ballet Fidelio on September 11 in Bonn, Germany at the beginning of The Beethoven Festival, where they performed their Beethoven Opera inspired ballet to packed audiences accompanied by the 106-piece Beethoven Orchestra. The ballet was received with a positive reaction from both the audiences and critics alike.

== Ghosts Of Violence ==
The Ghosts of Violence is a ballet created by Dobrovolskiy in collaboration with Sharon Pollock. It was inspired by the stories of women who were killed by intimate partner. The ballet will help raise public awareness on the devastating impact of domestic violence.

The creation of the ballet was supported in part by: The Government of Canada, Status of Women Canada, Atlantic Canada Opportunities Agency and The Canada Council of the Arts. In 2012, the Transition House Association of Nova Scotia, the World YWCA, Family SOS, Silent Witness Nova Scotia, and Leave Out Violence partnered together to host Ghosts of Violence in Halifax.

== Awards ==
The Atlantic Ballet Theatre of Canada won the Greater Moncton Chamber of Commerce Business Excellence Award (Prix D' Excellence) in 2006 and the Chamber's Export Success Award in 2007.

== Repertoire ==
Over the company's ten years of touring and performing, Dobrovolskiy has created most of the company's repertoire which has garnered good reviews. In 2010, dancer Leigh Alderson created a new work for the company for the Grant Thornton Gala held at the Capitiol Theatre, Moncton, NB.

Previous full length repertoire includes;

GHOSTS OF VIOLENCE

World Premiere- February 15, 2011, Ottawa, Canada Choreography- Igor Dobrovolskiy Music: – Alfred Schnittke, Sergei Rachmaninoff Lighting Design- Pierre Lavoie Costume Design- Denis Lavoie Set Design- Brian Perchaluk Projection design- Adam Larsen

FIDELIO

World Premiere-September 11, 2010, CO-PRODUCTION Theatre Bonn, Germany Music: Ludwig van Beethoven Lighting Design: Pierre Lavoie Costume Design: Denis Lavoie Set Design: Brian Perchaluk

ROMEO AND JULIET FANTASY

World Premiere-February 22, 2010 Boca Raton Florida A ballet in one act Music: Pyotr Ilyich Tchaikovsky Lighting Design: Pierre Lavoie Costume Design: Igor Dobrovolskiy Set Design: Igor Dobrovolskiy

FLEETING

World Premiere-World Premiere October 7, 2009, Moncton, New Brunswick Music: J. S Bach Lighting Design: Pierre Lavoie Costume Design: Igor Dobrovolskiy

KING LEAR

World Premier-October 10, 2008, Moncton New Brunswick Music: Dimitri Shostakovich Dramaturge: Sharon Pollock Costume Design: Denis Lavoie Lighting Design Pierre Lavoie

DON JUAN

World Premiere- October 12, 2007, Moncton New Brunswick Music: George Gershwin Dramaturge: Sharon Pollock Costume Design: Denis Lavoie Lighting Design Pierre Lavoie

PHANTOM OF THE OPERA

World Premiere-October 6, 2006, Moncton New Brunswick Music: Francis Poulenc Dramaturge: Sharon Pollock Set: Brian Perchaluk Costume: Paul Daigle Lighting: Denis Lavoie

AMADEUS

World Premiere – September 23, 2005 Moncton, New Brunswick Music: W.A. Mozart, A. Salieri Set and Costume Design: Michael Eagan Lighting Design: Pierre Lavoie

LES PORTES TOURNANTES

World Premiere, November 19, 2004 Moncton, New Brunswick Music: F. Dompierre Set and Costume Design: Michael Eagan Lighting: Julia Vandergraaf

MERLIN

World Premiere – October 25, 2003 Moncton, New Brunswick Music: G. Mahler Set Design: Darcy Poultney Costume Design: Paul Daigle

FIGARO

World Premiere – May 11, 2002 Moncton, New Brunswick Music: W.A. Mozart Set and Costume Design: Paul Daigle

Short Works

In 'D' Trois (August 2010) Glass Work (World Premiere November 12, 2010) [ch: Leigh Alderson] Sonata For Two (World Premiere November 12, 2010) Perpetual Motion (World Premiere November 12, 2010) Suspiro (World Premiere May 11, 2011) [ch: Kyle Davey & Janie Richard]

== Dancers ==
The company is renowned for the high standard of its international dancers, coming from the Ukraine, Australia, Japan, Northern Ireland, UK and Canada. As of 2010 the company consisted of: LEADERSHIP Artistic Director/Principal Choreographer: Igor Dobrovolskiy, CEO: Susan Chalmers-Gauvin

ADMINISTRATION Director of Marketing: Steve Smith Director of Fund Development: David Beckerson Operations and Community Relations Manager: Louis Philippe-Dionne Accounting: Michel Goguen

PRODUCTION Technical Director: Shawn Donellson Production Stage Manager: Yee-Hang Yam Lighting/Electricien: Daniel McIImoyl

Dancers: Eldiyar Daniyarov ( 2012–Present ) Leigh Alderson (2010–2013) Kyle Davey (2010–2012) Sergiy Diyanov(2003–Present) Yuriko Diyanova (2003–Present) Anton Lykhanov (2007–2012) Anya Nesvitaylo(2006–Present) Janie Richard (2010–2013) Evelina Sushko(2003–2011) Olena Zakharova (2007–Present) Louis-Philippe Dionne (2005–2012) Samantha Jane Gray (2011–2013) Lucy Lowndes (2011) Brian Gephart(2011–2013)
