= Scottish Opera =

National opera company of Scotland

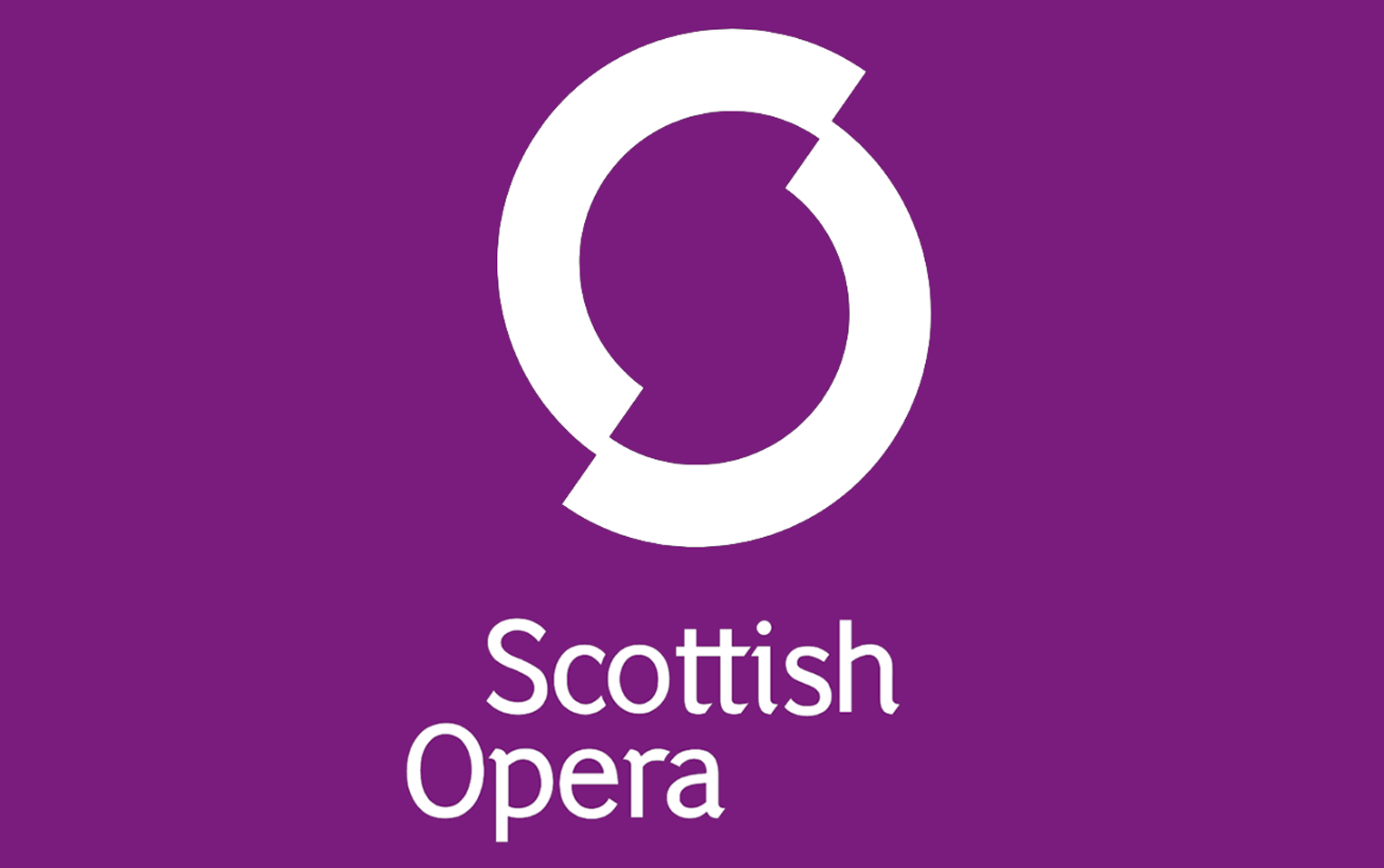

Scottish Opera is the national opera company of Scotland, and one of the five national performing arts companies of Scotland. Founded in 1962 and based in Glasgow, it is the largest performing arts organisation in Scotland.

== History ==
Scottish Opera was founded by conductor Alexander Gibson in 1962. In 1975 it purchased the Theatre Royal in Glasgow from Scottish Television, reopening it as the first national opera house for Scotland in October 1975 with Die Fledermaus. In March 2005, the management of the Theatre Royal was transferred to the Ambassador Theatre Group, but remains the home of Scottish Opera and of Scottish Ballet.

Scottish Opera dealt with various financial troubles, related to lack of funding and accusations of fiscal profligacy, during the first part of the 2000s. Its cycle of Richard Wagner's Ring was critically acclaimed, but also was highly draining of the company's financial resources. In 2004, a financial restructuring plan had called for the elimination of 88 jobs, including all 34 members of the chorus, and the suspension of the entire 2005–06 season. In protest, Sir Richard Armstrong announced his resignation in December 2004, effective at the end of the 2004–05 season.

Alex Reedijk became general director of the company in 2006. In August 2007, effective the same month, the company announced the appointment of Francesco Corti as its next music director.

Recent commissions include the Five:15 Operas Made in Scotland, part of a five-year research and development project to find the next generation of opera-makers, composers and librettists.

== Awards ==
The company has won awards, including the Barclays TMA Award for Outstanding Achievement in Opera for Macbeth and Der Rosenkavalier (both in 1994) and for Die Walküre and Siegfried (both in 2002), as well as the South Bank Show Award for "Best Opera" for the Ring Cycle (2004) and a Herald Angel Award for The Two Widows at the Edinburgh International Festival in 2008.

== Touring Scotland ==
The company tours far and wide across Scotland's mainland and islands to ensure performances are within reach of as many people as possible. In 2026/27, Scottish Opera is back on the road with Opera On Your Doorstep, touring Humperdinck's Hansel & Gretel to Stirling, Duns, Peebles, Maybole, St Andrews, Seil, Glengarnock, Bowmore, Campbeltown, Strontian, Pitlochry, Ullapool, Liniclate, Lossiemouth, Portree, Beauly, and Stranraer.

== Foreign tours ==
Scottish Opera has also staged many successful productions abroad, including Albert Herring in Florence, Egisto (opera) in Venice, tours in Germany, Austria, Portugal, France, Switzerland, Yugoslavia and Iceland and recent years including Peter Grimes and Tristan und Isolde in Lisbon; Macbeth at the Vienna International Festival and the European premiere of MacMillan's Ines de Castro in Porto, Portugal.

== Music directors ==
- Sir Alexander Gibson (1962–86)
- John Mauceri (1986–92)
- Sir Richard Armstrong (1992–2005)
- Francesco Corti (2007 – July 2013)
- Emmanuel Joel-Hornack (July 2013 – September 2013)
- Stuart Stratford (June 2015–present)
