= Igor Dobrovolskiy (choreographer) =

Ukrainian-born dance choreographer

Igor Dobrovolskiy is a Ukrainian-born dance choreographer based in New Brunswick, Canada.

== Background ==
He graduated from the Kyiv State Ballet Academy with a BFA in ballet pedagogy and choreography from the Kyiv National University of the Arts. His professional dance career began with the State Theatre of Opera and Ballet for Children and Youth in Kyiv, Ukraine. He has travelled across Europe and also worked in Ecuador.

In 2002, he and Susan Chalmers-Gauvin founded Ballet-théâtre atlantique du Canada/ The Atlantic Ballet Theatre of Canada, which is located in Moncton, New Brunswick. Here, Dobrovolskiy has choreographed and directed a diverse collection of original full-length narrative ballets along with short works which have explored contemporary themes within classical genre.

In 2014 he was awarded the Lieutenant-Governor's Award for High Achievement in the Arts by the New Brunswick Arts Board.

In 2016, Dobrovolskiy was one of the recipients of the Top 25 Canadian Immigrant Awards presented by Canadian Immigrant Magazine.
