= Ballet Ireland =

Irish ballet company, founded 1998

General information
- Name: Ballet Ireland
- Year founded: 1998
- Founders: Anne Maher, Gunther Falusy
- Website: balletireland.ie

Senior staff
- Company manager: Martin Lindinger

Artistic staff
- Artistic director: Anne Maher

Ballet Ireland is an Irish ballet company, established in 1998 by Günther Falusy and Anne Maher. Presenting a broad repertoire, it has been funded by the Arts Council of Ireland since 1999.

== History ==
Following various previous ventures, ballet in Ireland had a "home" in the Irish National Ballet, founded in 1973 and overseen by Joan Denise Moriarty. However, following a series of funding cuts, the company was disbanded in 1989 and doubt was expressed whether classical ballet could survive in Ireland. In 1998, Ballet Ireland was founded in Dublin by choreographer and dancer Günther Falusy (1946–2017), and the professional ballet dancer Anne Maher, to re-establish performance of classical ballet in the capital. The opening production was at the Gaiety Theatre, Dublin. The Arts Council of Ireland provided substantial grants from 1999 to 2003, allowing the new company to become established. This funding has continued, allowing annual performances and tours throughout Ireland and to a lesser extent in the UK. Since then, the company has presented over 30 seasons of work and is also involved in educational programmes such as professional workshops and summer schools. In 2013, the President of Ireland, Michael D. Higgins, a former Arts Minister, became the patron of the company.

== Performances ==
Ballet Ireland began with a conventional repertoire of well-known ballets such as The Nutcracker, Swan Lake and The Sleeping Beauty. Once fully established, it started to take works on tour, for example, a production of Giselle from 2017, performed at the Edinburgh Festival Fringe in 2018 which The Guardian called "part modern murder mystery, part romantic ballet classic" and Anna Winter in The Stage described as a "full-blooded re-imagining staged with zeal". The company has also extended its range of works to include contemporary dance and reinterpretations of classic ballets.

British choreographer Morgann Runacre-Temple was choreographer-in-residence at Ballet Ireland from 2009 to 2015, creating five full-length ballets for the company, including Cinderella, Romeo and Juliet and Carmen. Her Romeo and Juliet, which premiered in 2010 and relocated the story to a modern-day secondary school as a play within a play, was described by The Irish Times as the company's "finest full-length production to date". The production was restaged for a national tour in 2012.

The company collaborated with the Irish Chamber Orchestra on a 2014 production of Rodion Shchedrin's Carmen Suite (ballet) and with the RTÉ Concert Orchestra on a number of productions.

In 2021, Ballet Ireland commissioned Runacre-Temple to create a new one-act, Irish-themed version of The Nutcracker, with a Tchaikovsky-based score arranged by composer Tom Lane.

== See also ==
- Cork City Ballet
