= Peter Darrell =

British ballet dancer and choreographer

Peter Darrell CBE.

Peter Darrell CBE (né Skinner; 16 September 1929 – 2 December 1987) was an English ballet dancer, choreographer, and founder of the Scottish Ballet. For almost four decades Darrell was one of the most productive and imaginative talents in British ballet.

Born in Richmond, Surrey, he studied at the Sadler's Wells Ballet School, joined the opera ballet there and then took part in the inaugural performance of The Sadler's Wells Ballet Company – what is now Birmingham Royal Ballet.

He then worked in musicals and at the Malmö Opera House, Sweden, until the founding of "Ballet Workshop" at the Mercury Theatre, London, brought the chance for would-be choreographers to try their talents. Darrell proved to be their best discovery and from 1951 to 1955 made a series of skilled and original works there. This experience led, in 1952, to his first professional commission when Anton Dolin invited him to create a new version of Harlequinade for Festival Ballet.

From the first, Darrell had two guiding aims: to use classical ballet to entertain the widest possible public, and to introduce contemporary themes and the influence of other theatrical skills. This led in 1956 to a collaboration with the like-minded Elizabeth West, who was teaching at the Old Vic School in Bristol. Together they founded the company which was then called Western Theatre Ballet. After her untimely death in 1962, Darrell remained in sole charge.

That company soon won a high reputation for the drama, humour and individuality of its productions, starting with The Prisoners (1957), which has been revived frequently. Also notable among Darrell's very large creative output for that company were his modern-dress interpretations of Debussy's Jeux and the first ballet to be based on Beatles music, Mods and Rockers.

In 1969 the company accepted an invitation to move its base to Glasgow, where it became Scottish Theatre Ballet, and later, in recognition of a widening repertoire and purpose, Scottish Ballet, with its new home theatre being the Theatre Royal, Glasgow from 1975. Darrell's choreography remained its foundation stone, in productions across Britain and in overseas tours as far as Japan. The Tales of Hoffmann (1972) and Cinderella (1979) are probably the best examples of his long narrative works, which also include Mary Queen of Scots, a radical new treatment of Swan Lake and an intelligent and stylish production of Giselle.

He made numerous shorter works for Scottish Ballet and other companies, including the lyrical Five Rückert Songs (1978). Several of his ballets were staged abroad by companies in Australia, Czechoslovakia, Japan, Hong Kong and the USA.

He also directed several musical and shows, including the nude revue Carte Blanche.

He was awarded the CBE in 1984. He died in Glasgow on 2 December 1987.

== Press cuttings ==
"Peter Darrell was a man of theatre above all else, and his ballets and his artistic judgements never ignored the fact that dancing is not a remote and introspective activity, but an art of the theatre. He was a man of wonderful humour, strong enthusiasms: his memorial is not only his company and his choreography, but the marked influence he had upon the way we think of ballet today" Clement Crisp, 'Financial Times' - December 1987.

"Of all the leading British choreographers, Darrell is most like Ashton in being sensitive to the spirit of the time; not just following fashion, but feeling the way people move, think and behave, and reflecting it in his work" John Percival, 'The Times' - November 1969.

== See also ==
- Elaine McDonald
