= Gregory Dean =

English ballet dancer

Gregory Dean (born 1984) is an English ballet dancer. After terms with the Ballet Vorpommern and the Scottish Ballet, he joined the Royal Danish Ballet in 2008 where he has been promoted to principal dancer.

== Biography ==
Born in London, Dean trained in ballet at the Tring Park School. In 2004, he danced with the Ballet Vorpommern before joining the Scottish Ballet in 2005, performing several leading roles including Balanchine's Apollo. After joining the Royal Danish Ballet in 2008, he became a soloist in 2011 and in December 2013 he was promoted to the rank of principal dancer following his performance of the prince in The Nutcracker. Other notable performances include his Romeo in John Neumeier's Romeo and Juliet and his role as Hank in Twyla Tharps Come Fly Away.
