= Cork City Ballet =

Irish ballet company, founded 1992

- Industry: Performing arts
- Founded: 1992
- Founder: Alan Foley
- Headquarters: Firkin Crane, Cork, Ireland
- Key people: Alan Foley (Artistic Director), Patricia Crosbie (Ballet Mistress) Colette McNamee (Chairperson)
- Revenue: 127,088 euro (2018)
- Total assets: 22,853 euro (2021)
- Number of employees: 0 (2021, 2022)
- Website: www.corkcityballet.com

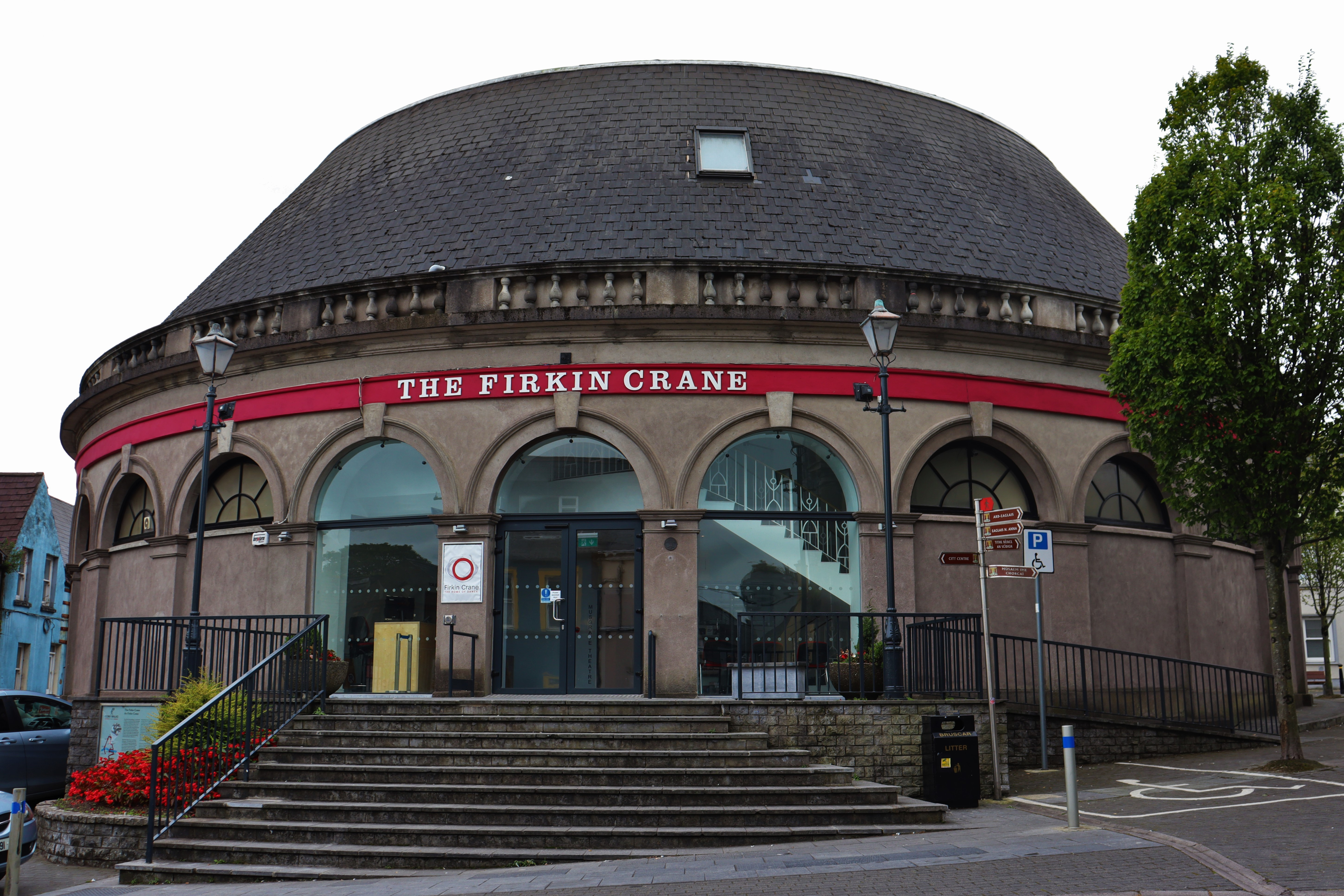
The Firkin Crane, in the Shandon area of Cork City, is a permanent base for Cork City Ballet, Crux Dance Theatre and other dance activities

Cork City Ballet is an Irish ballet company founded in 1992 by Alan Foley, a student of Joan Denise Moriarty. It is one of two professional ballet companies in Ireland. Cork City Ballet performs annually at Cork Opera House, staging (for example) a production of Giselle in 2011. It has also toured venues such as Wexford Opera House and The Helix in Dublin. Cork City Ballet has worked with a number of guest artists and companies such as Royal Swedish Ballet and Kirov Ballet. In 2012, Cork City Ballet commemorated the centenary of the birth of Joan Denise Moriarty, the founder of Irish Theatre Ballet, Ireland's first professional ballet company.

== Notable productions ==
- 2006 - La Bayadere (Irish tour)
- 2010 - Swan Lake (For centenary of Aloys Fleischmann)
- 2011 - Giselle (Prelude to the Joan Denise Moriarty centenary celebrations)
- 2011 - Playboy of the Western World (Revival)
- 2012 - The Sleeping Beauty (For the centenary celebrations of Joan Denise Moriarty)

== See also ==
- Ballet Ireland
