= Scottish Ballet =

Ballet company in Scotland

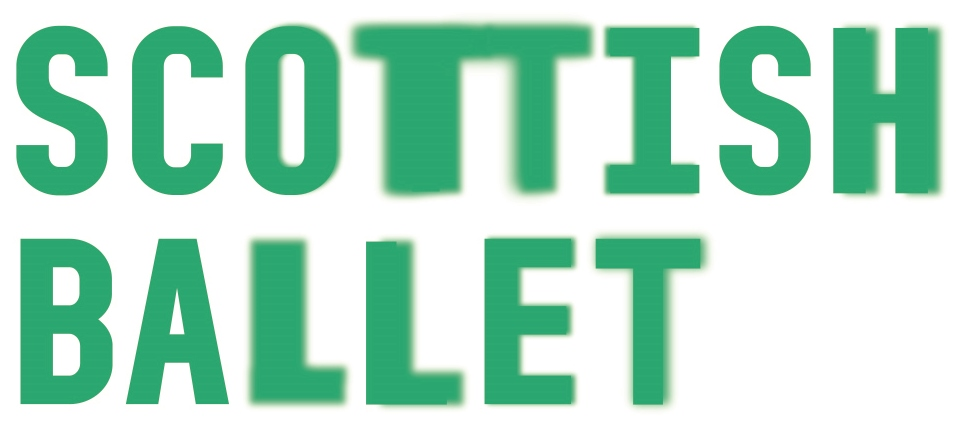

General information
- Name: Scottish Ballet
- Previous names: Scottish Theatre Ballet; Western Theatre Ballet
- Year founded: 1969
- Founders: Peter Darrell; Elizabeth West
- Principal venue: Tramway Arts Centre, Glasgow
- Website: www.scottishballet.co.uk

Senior staff
- Director: Christopher Hampson

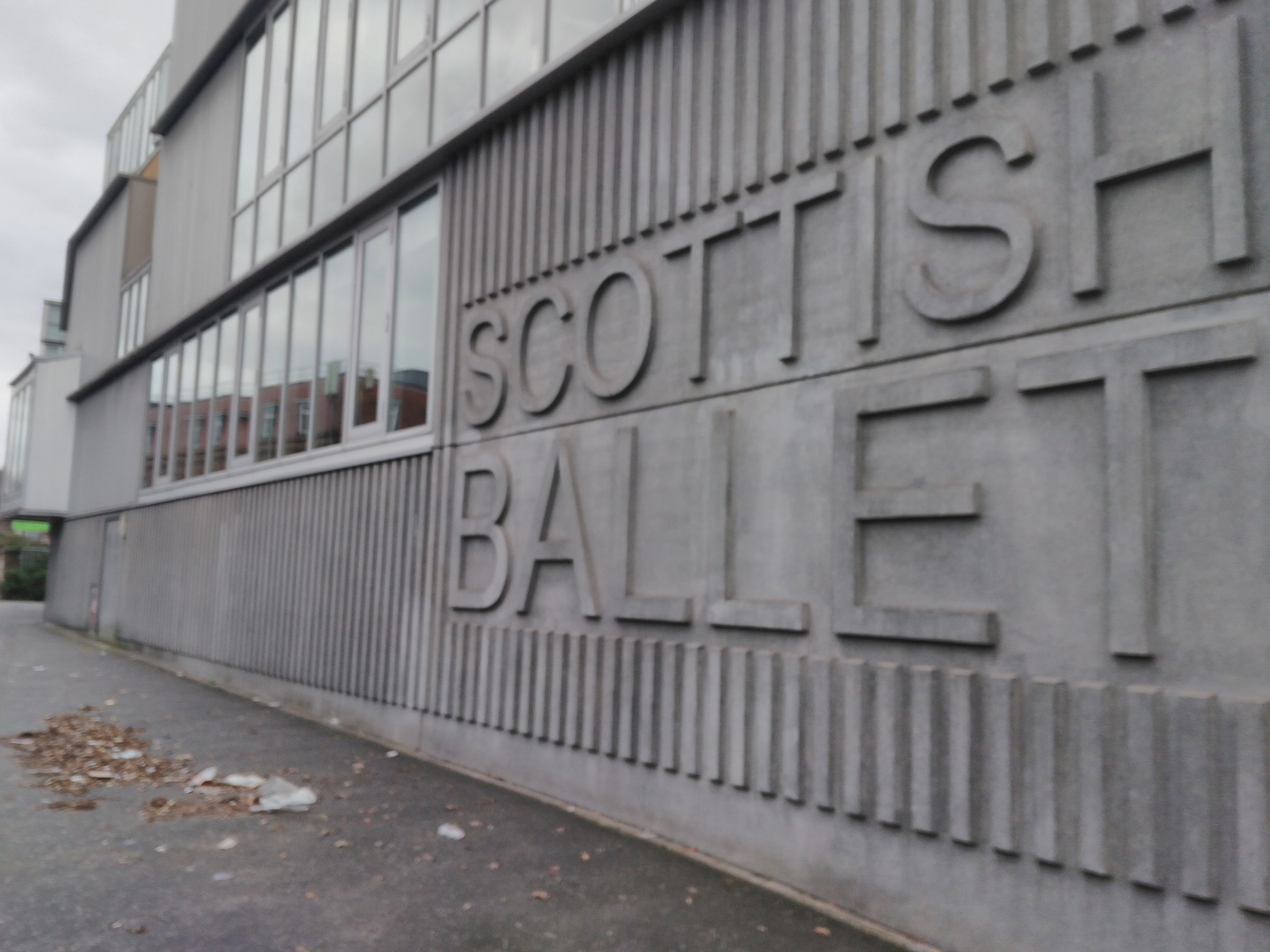
Inscription on wall of the Scottish Ballet building in Glasgow

Scottish Ballet is the national ballet company of Scotland and one of the five leading ballet companies of the United Kingdom, alongside the Royal Ballet, English National Ballet, Birmingham Royal Ballet and Northern Ballet. Founded in 1969, the company is based in Glasgow, the resident ballet company at the Glasgow Theatre Royal and from 2009 in their purpose-built ballet centre in Tramway Arts Centre, Glasgow.

== History ==
Scottish Ballet is Scotland's national dance company. Its primary aim is to provide programmes of world-class dance performance and educational activity at all scales. Scottish Ballet presents a wide range of dance to audiences across Scotland, the UK and abroad – and employs 36 professional dancers, 41 staff and a part-time freelance orchestra of up to 70 musicians.

Founded by Peter Darrell and Elizabeth West as the Western Theatre Ballet in Bristol in 1957, the company moved to Glasgow in 1969 and was renamed Scottish Theatre Ballet, changing to Scottish Ballet in 1974. A year later its home theatre became the Theatre Royal, Glasgow when Scottish Opera bought it and transformed it as the first national opera house in Scotland. The Company performs across Scotland, the UK and abroad, with strong classical technique at the root of all of its work. Its broad repertory includes new versions of the classics, seminal pieces from the 20th century modern ballet canon, signature pieces by living choreographers and new commissions. As a national company, Scottish Ballet performs at theatres in Aberdeen, Edinburgh, Glasgow and Inverness and in smaller venues throughout Scotland. The company's long history of touring internationally includes visits to China, Hong Kong, Malaysia, Portugal, Ireland and the rest of the UK. Scottish Ballet's many recent awards include the 2004 TMA Award for Outstanding Achievement in Dance in recognition of its modernisation programme and dynamic performances. Scottish Ballet's current artistic director Christopher Hampson joined the company in 2012.

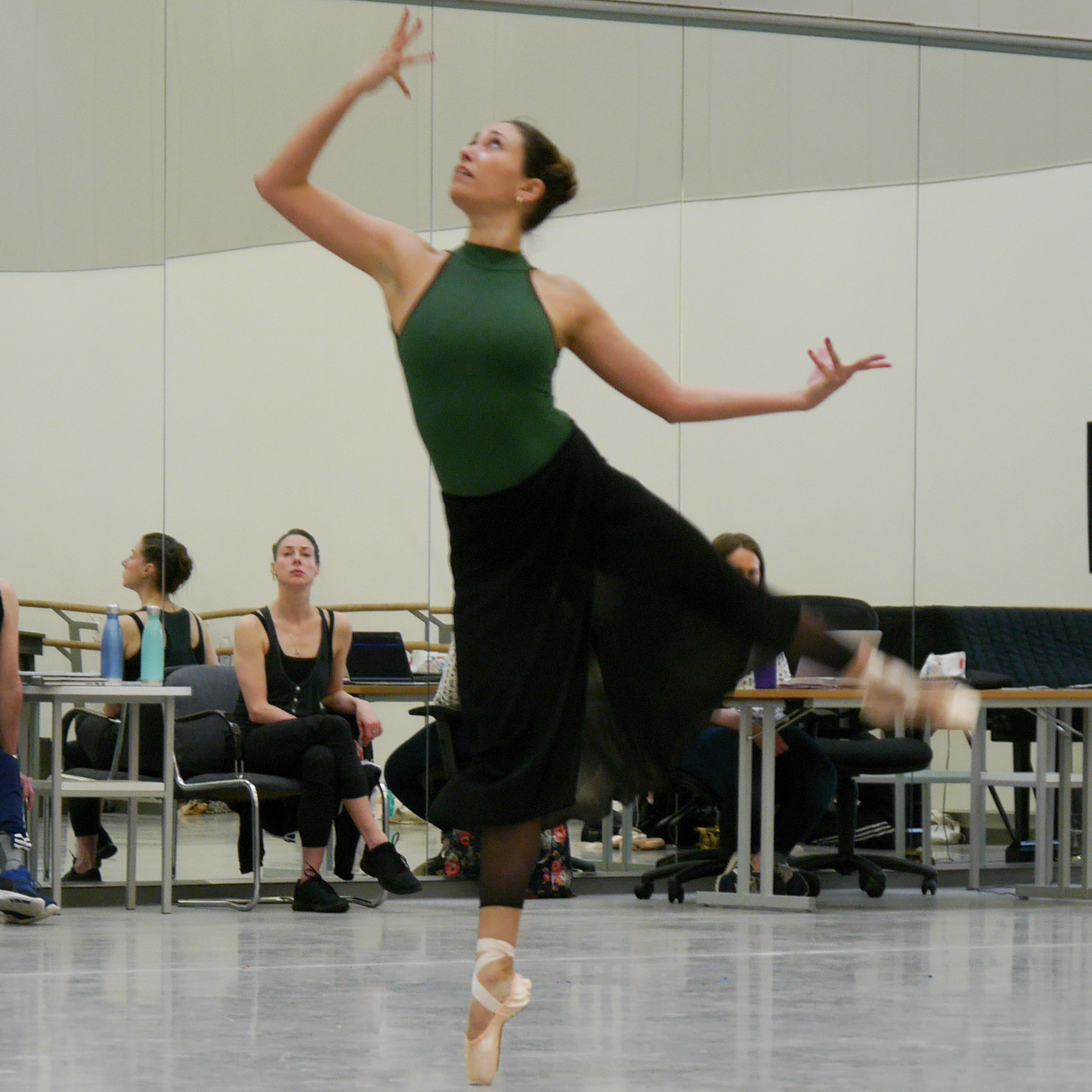
Scottish Ballet's 50th anniversary year

The company provides dance classes and a variety of education initiatives, including work with children and adults of all ages and abilities, and the Associate Programme which encourages aspiring young dancers to train for a career in the industry. Scottish Ballet also has close links with Royal Conservatoire of Scotland, partnering the BA Modern Ballet and M.Mus. (Pianist for Dance) degree courses.

Scottish Ballet was the first dance company in Europe to offer live audio description for the visually impaired, and maintains a programme of regular audio described performances throughout Scotland. Scottish Ballet won the Stef Stefanou Award for Outstanding Company in the 2023 National Dance Awards.

== Repertoire ==
Scottish Ballet presents a broad repertoire, ranging from new versions of the classics (The Nutcracker, Cinderella), 20th century modern ballet repertoire (work by George Balanchine, Frederick Ashton), work by living choreographers (William Forsythe, Hans van Manen, Siobhan Davies) and new commissions (David Dawson, Helen Pickett, Annabelle Lopez Ochoa, Sophie Laplane).

Current repertoire:

- Apollo (1928) by George Balanchine
- Façade (1931/1935) by Frederick Ashton
- The Four Temperaments (1946, revised 1977) by George Balanchine
- Scènes de Ballet (1947) by Frederick Ashton
- Afternoon of a Faun (1953) by Jerome Robbins
- Agon (1957) by George Balanchine
- Episodes (1959) by George Balanchine
- Song of the Earth (1965) by Kenneth MacMillan
- Rubies (1967) by George Balanchine
- Othello (1971) by Peter Darrell
- Twilight (1972) by Hans van Manen
- The Nutcracker (1973) by Peter Darrell. Additional choreography by Christopher Hampson
- Five Rückert Songs (1978) by Peter Darrel
- Suite From Artifact (1984, as Suite from Artifact 2004) by William Forsythe
- Dangerous Liaisons (1985) by Richard Alston
- Refurbished Behaviour (1985, revised 2005) by Ashley Page
- White Man Sleeps (1988) by Siobhan Davies
- MiddleSexGorge (1990) by Stephen Petronio
- Walking in the Heat (1990) by Ashley Page
- For M.G.– The Movie (1991) by Trisha Brown
- Fearful Symmetries (1994) by Ashley Page
- 32 Cryptograms (1996) by Ashley Page
- Room of Cooks (1997) by Ashley Page
- Two Pieces for HET (1997) by Hans van Manen
- Cheating, Lying, Stealing (1998) by Ashley Page
- Workwithinwork (1998) by William Forsythe
- Soft Underbelly (1999) by Ashley Page
- In Light and Shadow (2000) by Krzysztof Pastor
- Acrid Avid Jam (2001) by Ashley Page
- The Nutcracker (2003) by Ashley Page
- The Nutcracker– Diverts (2003) by Ashley Page
- Nightswimming into day (2004) by Ashley Page
- Cinderella (2005) by Ashley Page
- The Pump Room (2005) by Ashley Page
- Sirocco (2006) by Diana Loosmore
- Chasing Ghosts (2007) by Diana Loosmore
- Ride The Beast (2007) by Stephen Petronio

- The Sleeping Beauty (2007) by Ashley Page
- From Where (2008) by Paul Liburd
- Lull (2008) by Diana Loosmore
- Pennies from Heaven (2008) by Ashley Page
- Romeo and Juliet (2008) by Krzysztof Pastor
- Traume (2008) by Gregory Dean
- Carmen (2009) by Richard Alston
- Petrushka (2009) by Ian Spink
- Still Life (2010) by Val Caniparoli
- Alice (2011) by Ashley Page
- New Work (2011) by Jorma Elo
- “A Streetcar Named Desire” (2012) by Annabelle Lopez Ochoa
- “Highland Fling” (2013) by Sir Matthew Bourne
- Silhouette (2013) by Christopher Hampson
- Trace (2013) by Helen Pickett
- Maze (2015) by Sophie Laplane
- Hansel & Gretel (2016) by Christopher Hampson
- The Snow Queen (2018) by Ashley Page
- “The Crucible” (2019) by Helen Pickett
- Dextera (2019) by Sophie Laplane
- Emergence (2019) by Crystal Pite
- Starstruck (2021) by Gene Kelly with additional choreography by Christopher Hampson
- Coppélia (2022) by Morgann Runacre-Temple & Jessica Wright
- Cinders! (2023) by Christopher Hampson
- Outcast (2023) by Dickson Mbi
- Trifecta (2023) by Nicholas Shoesmith
- Twice-Born (2023) by Dicksom Mbi
- Mary, Queen of Scots (2025) by Sophie Laplane & James Bonas
- Wee Nutcracker (2025) by Christopher Hampson with additional choreography by Nicholas Shoesmith
- Entress (2026) by Julia Cheng

== Headquarters ==
In June 2009 Scottish Ballet moved to new, purpose-built premises in Glasgow's Southside, next to the Tramway Theatre, which had been designed by Malcolm Fraser Architects.

== Dancers ==
=== Principals ===
- Marlen Fuerte-Castro
- Jessica Fyfe
- Roseanna Leney
- Yuri Marques
- Bruno Micchiardi

=== Soloists ===
- Grace Horler
- Harvey Littlefield
- Rimbaud Patron
- Melissa Parsons
- Gina Scott
- Claire Souet
- Kayla-Maree Tarantolo
- Yipeng Xu

=== First Artists ===
- Andrea Azzari
- Rishan Benjamin
- Hannah Cubitt
- James Garrington
- Alice Kawalek
- Urara Takata
- Benjamin Thomas
- Anna Williams

=== Artists ===
- Charley Austin
- Matthew Bates
- Rafael Bejarano
- Antonia Cramb
- Harvey Evans
- Lewis Fornby
- Calum Gray
- Theo Greenfield
- Mackenzie Jacob
- Hamish Longley
- Danila Marzilli
- Alfie McPherson
- Mayu Takata
- Claire Tjoe-Fat
- Elizabeth Williams
- Seira Winning

=== Notable former dancers ===
- Leigh Alderson
- Daria Klimentová
- Noriko Ohara
- Sophie Martin

== See also ==
- Culture in Glasgow
- Scotland's National Arts Companies
