= Olivia Geerolf =

Belgian choreographer (1950–2023)

- Born: 1950; Bruges, Belgium
- Died: 20 January 2023 (aged 72); Bruges, Belgium
- Occupation: choreographer

Olivia Geerolf (1950 – 20 January 2023) was a Belgian choreographer. She founded the Bruges Ballet School in Bruges in 1970 (now named the Ballet Olivia Geerolf). Between 1971 and 2015, Geerolf was the permanent choreographer of the Procession of the Holy Blood and of the five-yearly Procession of the Golden Tree in Bruges. In 2015, the choreography of the Procession of the Holy Blood was taken over by her former student Jolien Smis.

She received the Van Acker Prize in 1980, for her work as a dance teacher, choreographer and for the social impact of her work.

Geerolf died at the AZ Sint-Jan in Bruges on 20 January 2023, at the age of 72. She was survived by her husband, the prominent clarinetist Hedwig Swimberghe.
