= So You Think You Can Dance (Belgium and the Netherlands TV series) season 5 =

Television series, 2012 season

So You Think You Can Dance
- Season 5
- Hosted by: An Lemmens; Dennis Weening
- Judges: Dan Karaty; Euvgenia Parakhina; Jan Kooijman; Ish Ait Hamou
- Winner: Frederic De Smet

Release
- Original network: RTL 5 (Netherlands) vtm (Belgium)
- Original release: September 2 – December 9, 2012

Season chronology
- ← Previous; Season 4 Next → Season 6

The fifth season of So You Think You Can Dance, a Dutch/Belgian televised dance competition, aired in the fall of 2012 on networks RTL 5 (Netherlands) and vtm (Belgium). Judges Dan Karaty, Euvgenia Parakhina and Jan Kooijman all returned as permanent members of the judge's panel. Departing judge Marco Gerrits was replaced by choreographer Ish Ait Hamou. An Lemmens and Dennis Weening returned in their roles as co-hosts. On December 9, hip-hop dancer Frederic de Smet was announced as the winner of the competition and awarded a choice of dance school scholarship and €25,000.

== Selection process ==
=== Open Auditions ===
The announcement that So You Think You Can Dance had been picked up for a fifth season was made during the fourth season finale on November 27, 2011, but registration of contestants did not begin until several months later. As with season four, open auditions were held at the Royal Theatre Carré in Amsterdam on July 8 and 9 and in the BOZAR in Brussels on July 15 and 16. As with previous seasons, the open auditions represented the initial assessment of contestants before the more extensive workshops of the show's “Bootcamp” phase; however, unlike in previous seasons, the judges awarded special places to four different contestants (Vita Boers, Sarah Mancini, Remy Vetter and Niels van den Heuvel), which allowed them to proceed immediately to the foreign phase of the bootcamp, skipping the initial workshops at the “ArtEz” Arnhem studios.

=== Bootcamp ===
The initial workshops of the Bootcamp phase took place at ArtEZ dance studious in Arnhem during July 20–22. Just over 100 contestants participated after being selected during the open auditions. Day one featured workshops for four dance styles – hip-hop, Latin, modern, and jazz – the results of which more than halved the number of contestants to 43. One dancer, Vivian Gomez Cardoso, impressed the judges to such a degree during this first day that she was immediately awarded a spot in the foreign component of the Bootcamp; Cardoso would go on to take second place for the season. During the second day, couples were formed and given a piece of music from any of a number of genres, around which they were required to design a short routine. Based on these performances, the judges selected half of the remaining dancers (21, plus the additional five already awarded places) to proceed to the foreign phase of the Bootcamp, held in New York City, for season 5.

Once in New York, the remaining dancers were granted the choice of a modern or hip-hop workshop, though they were given no details as to where and under whom these would take place until after they made their choice. Those who chose hip-hop were trained by hip-hop choreographer “Dixter” in the Bronx, whereas those who chose modern went to the prestigious Alvin Ailey American Dance Theater in Manhattan. These workshops were immediately followed by a challenge to develop group choreography within these two styles, with a total of four performances (two each for hip-hop and modern); a handful of contestants were eliminated from competition immediately after. These eliminations were followed by the contestants attending an exclusive closed-doors rehearsal of the musical Chicago, which became an introduction to the next challenge – the performance of an iconic and challenging piece of choreography from that show, dancing in pairs as back-up to actress/dancer Dylis Croman in the lead role of Roxie Hart. To further challenge the dancers, they were told neither their partner nor their relative role in the choreography until just before their performances. After this final challenge, and taking into account past performances, the judges selected 18 dancers from the remaining contestants to move on and participate in the Live Shows.

== Top 18 contestants ==
=== Male Contestants ===
Finalist	Age	Home	Dance style	Elimination date
Frederic De Smet	19	Eeklo, Belgium	Hip-hop	Winner
Denden Karadeniz	22	Alkmaar, Netherlands	Breakdance	4th place
Delano Spenrath	18	Ede, Netherlands	Hip-hop	December 2, 2012
Arno Brys	18	Kortrijk, Belgium	Modern	November 25, 2012
Remy Vetter	24	Woerden, Netherlands	Lyrical Hip-hop	November 18, 2012
Sinerjey Meyfroodt	25	Ypres, Belgium	Hip-hop	November 11, 2012
Niels van den Heuvel	23	Amsterdam, Netherlands	Hip-hop	November 4, 2012
Hessel de Graaf	20	Amsterdam, Netherlands	Hip-hop	October 28, 2012
Daniel Vissers	25	Amsterdam, Netherlands	Jazz	October 21, 2012

=== Female Contestants ===
Finalist	Age	Home	Dance style	Elimination date
Vivian Cardoso Gomez	21	Amsterdam, Netherlands	Jazz	Runner-up
Kalila Hermant	22	Auderghem, Belgium	Hip-hop	3rd place
Davinia Janssens	18	Sint-Truiden, Belgium	Jazz	December 2, 2012
Vita Boers	22	Amsterdam, Netherlands	Jazz	November 25, 2012
Eliane Nsanze	28	Brussels, Belgium	Modern	November 18, 2012
Iris Meeusen 1	22	Zwanenburg, Netherlands	Latin	November 11, 2012
Sarah Mancini	22	Tilburg, Netherlands	Jazz	November 4, 2012
Inge Devroey	22	Leuven, Belgium	Jazz	October 28, 2012
Masha Verdegem	19	Evergem, Belgium	Jazz	October 21, 2012

^1 Meeusen replaced original Top 18 dancer Isabel Bérénos, who voluntarily withdrew from the competition.

== Live shows ==
=== Eliminations Table ===
Female	Male	Dance For Your Life	Bottom Participants

Week:	21/10	28/10	04/11	11/11	18/11	25/11	02/12	09/12
Candidate	Result							
Frederic De Smet			DFYL					WINNER
Vivian Cardoso Gomez		DFYL		DFYL				RUNNER-UP
Kalila Hermant			DFYL		Btm	Btm	Btm	3rd
Denden Karadeniz		DFYL		DFYL			Btm	4th
Delano Spenrath			DFYL			Btm	Elim	
Davinia Janssens							Elim	
Arno Brys				DFYL	Btm	Elim		
Vita Boers			DFYL			Elim		
Remy Vetter					Elim			
Eliane Nsanze	DFYL			DFYL	Elim			
Sinerjey Meyfroodt	DFYL			Elim				
Iris Meeusen				Elim				
Niels van den Heuvel		DFYL	Elim					
Sarah Mancini		DFYL	Elim					
Hessel de Graaf	DFYL	Elim						
Inge Devroey	DFYL	Elim						
Daniel Fishermen	Elim							
Masha Verdegem	Elim							
Isabel Bérénos	WD							

=== Live Show 1 (21 October 2012) ===
Couple	Style	Music	Choreographer	Results
Eliane Nsanze; Sinerjey Meyfroodt	Jazz	"The Fear" - Ben Howard	Laurent Flament	Dance for your Life
Sarah Mancini; Niels van den Heuvel	Lyrical hip-hop	"Don't Wake Me Up" - Chris Brown	Vincent Vianen	Safe
Inge Devroey; Hessel de Graaf	Modern	"You Lost Me" - Christina Aguilera	Isabelle Beernaert	Dance for your Life
Masha Verdegem; Daniel Fishermen	Disco	"Hush Hush, Hush Hush" - The Pussycat Dolls	Laurent Flament	Dance for your Life
Iris Meeusen; Arno Brys	Viennese Waltz	"I Won't Give Up" - Jason Mraz	Peter Bosveld; Ilse Lans	Safe
Davinia Janssens; Remy Vetter	Hip-hop	"She Wolf (Falling to Pieces)" - David Guetta featuring Sia	Steeve Austin	Safe
Vita Boers; Frederic De Smet	Cha-cha	"Dance Again" - Jennifer Lopez featuring Pitbull	Fame Jana de Haan; Koen Brouwers	Safe
Kalila Hermant; Delano Spenrath	Hip-hop	"Ayo Technology" - 50 Cent featuring Justin Timberlake and Timbaland	Vincent Vianen	Safe
Vivian Cardoso Gomez; Denden Karadeniz	Modern	"Wil Niet Dat Je Weg Gaat (Do Not Want You To Leave)" - Clouseau	Isabelle Beernaert	Safe

Show 1 Results

- Group Choreography: Top 18: "Bangarang" - Skrillex featuring Sirah (Hip Hop Contemporary, Choreographer: Roy Julen)
- Dance For Your Life solos:

Dancer	Style	Music	Results
Masha Verdegem	Jazz	"Control" Vitamin String Quartet	Eliminated
Inge Devroey	Jazz	"Bedroom Hymns" - Florence + The Machine	Safe
Eliane Nsanze	Modern	"Toxicity" - System Of A Down	Safe
Daniel Fishermen	Jazz	"DJ Got Us Fallin 'in Love" - Usher featuring Pitbull	Eliminated
Hessel de Graaf	Hip-hop	"Green Light" - John Legend featuring Andre 3000	Safe
Sinerjey Meyfroodt	Hip-hop	"Pump It" - Black Eyed Peas	Safe

=== Live Show 2 (28 October 2012) ===
Couple	Style	Music	Choreographer	Results
Davinia Janssens; Remy Vetter	Samba	"La Tortura" - Shakira featuring Alejandro Sanz	Fame Jana de Haan; Koen Brouwers	Safe
Iris Meeusen; Arno Brys	Jazz	"Hall of Fame" - The Script featuring Will.i.am	Percey Kruythof	Safe
Vita Boers; Frederic De Smet	Modern	"Unfinished Sympathy" - Hooverphonic	Isabelle Beernaert	Safe
Inge Devroey; Hessel de Graaf	Lyrical hip-hop	"Read All About It" - Professor Green featuring Emeli Sande	Vincent Vianen	Dance for your Life
Sarah Mancini; Niels van den Heuvel	Slowfox	"Fever" - Michael Bublé	Peter Bosveld; Ilse Lans	Dance for your Life
Eliane Nsanze; Sinerjey Meyfroodt	Hip-hop	"Let Me Love You (Until You Learn to Love Yourself)" - Ne-Yo	Steeve Austin	Safe
Vivian Cardoso Gomez; Denden Karadeniz	Disco	"Hot Stuff" - Donna Summer	Laurent Flament	Dance for your Life
Kalila Hermant; Delano Spenrath	Modern	"Bring Me To Life" - Evanescence	Isabelle Beernaert	Safe

Show 2 Results

- 'Group Choreography: Top 16: 'Euphoria' - Loreen (Modern, Choreographer: Roy Julen)
- Dance For Your Life solos:

Dancer	Style	Music	Results
Inge Devroey	Jazz	"End of Time" - Beyoncé	Eliminated
Sarah Mancini	Jazz	"Hope There's Someone" - Antony and The Johnsons	Safe
Vivian Cardoso Gomez	Jazz	"I Just Want To Love ... To You" - Etta James	Safe
Hessel de Graaf	Hip-hop	"This Time" - John Legend	Eliminated
Niels van den Heuvel	Hip-hop	"Dr. Feel Good" - Travie McCoy featuring Cee Lo Green	Safe
Denden Karadeniz	Breakdance	"Super Bad" - James Brown	Safe

=== Live Show 3 (4 November 2012) ===
Couple	Style	Music	Choreographer	Results
Vivian Cardoso Gomez; Denden Karadeniz	Lyrical hip-hop	"Diamonds" - Rihanna	Vincent Vianen	Safe
Davinia Janssens; Remy Vetter	Modern	"Big Jet Plane" - Angus & Julia Stone	Min Hee Bervoets	Safe
Eliane Nsanze; Sinerjey Meyfroodt	Waltz	"The Chairman's Waltz" - from Memoirs of a Geisha	Peter Bosveld; Ilse Lans	Safe
Kalila Hermant; Delano Spenrath	Jive	"Good God" - Anouk	Fame Jana de Haan; Koen Brouwers	Dance for your Life
Sarah Mancini; Niels van den Heuvel	Modern	"Gravity" - Sara Bareilles	Isabelle Beernaert	Dance for your Life
Iris Meeusen; Arno Brys	Hip-hop	"Turn Up The Music" - Chris Brown	Steeve Austin	Safe
Vita Boers; Frederic De Smet	Jazz	"Let Her Go" - Passenger	Laurent Flament	Dance for your Life

Show 3 Results

- 'Group Choreography: Top 14: "Niggas in Paris" - Jay-Z and Kanye West (Hip-hop, Choreographer: Roy Julen)
- Dance For Your Life solos:

Dancer	Style	Music	Results
Kalila Hermant	Hip-hop	"Insecure" Delilah	Safe
Sarah Mancini	Jazz	"It's Oh So Quiet" - Björk	Eliminated
Vita Boers	Jazz	"The Lady Is A Tramp" - Tony Bennett & Lady Gaga	Safe
Delano Spenrath	Hip-hop	"Lemme See" Yella Boy	Safe
Niels van den Heuvel	Hip-hop	"Lotus Flower Bomb" - Wale featuring Miguel	Eliminated
Frederic De Smet	Hip-hop	"I Do not Dance" - DMX featuring MGK	Safe

=== Live Show 4 (11 November 2012) ===
Couple	Style	Music	Choreographer	Results
Davinia Janssens; Remy Vetter	Quickstep	"Da Bop" WTF!	Peter Bosveld; Ilse Lans	Safe
Iris Meeusen; Arno Brys	Modern	"Somewhere Only We Know" - Keane	Isabelle Beernaert	Dance for your Life
Eliane Nsanze; Sinerjey Meyfroodt	Hip-hop	"Lose Control" - Missy Elliott featuring Ciara & Fatman Scoop	Vincent Vianen	Dance for your Life
Kalila Hermant; Delano Spenrath	Jazz	"Show Me How You Burlesque" - Christina Aguilera	Laurent Flament	Safe
Vita Boers; Frederic De Smet	Hip-hop	"Numb" - Usher	Steeve Austin	Safe
Vivian Cardoso Gomez; Denden Karadeniz	Rumba	"Voorbij (Beyond)" - Marco Borsato & Thu	Fame Jana de Haan; Koen Brouwers	Dance for your Life

Show 4 Results

- 'Group Choreography: Top 12: "Mirror" - Lil Wayne featuring Bruno Mars (Hip-hop, Choreographer: Roy Julen)
- Dance For Your Life solos:

Dancer	Style	Music	Results
Iris Meeusen	Latin	"Conga" - Miami Sound Machine	Eliminated
Vivian Cardoso Gomez	Jazz	"At Last" - Etta James	Safe
Eliane Nsanze	Modern	"Sodat Aza Na Kati" - Dj Spilulu feat Dacosta	Safe
Arno Brys	Modern	"Workin 'Day And Night" - Michael Jackson	Safe
Denden Karadeniz	Breakdance	"The Real Undead" Tiz On Recordz	Safe
Sinerjey Meyfroodt	Hip-hop	"I'm In The House '- Steve Aoki featuring Zuper Blahq	Eliminated

=== Live Show 5 (18 November 2012) ===
Couple	Style	Music	Choreographer
Davinia Janssens; Delano Spenrath	Lyrical hip-hop	"Girl On Fire" - Alicia Keys featuring Nicki Minaj	Reshmay Jankie
Eliane Nsanze; Frederic De Smet	Jazz	"One Day / Reckoning Song (Wankelmut Rmx)" - Asaf Avidan	Laurent Flament
Vita Boers; Arno Brys	Tango	"Tango De Los Asesinos (Assassin's Tango)" - John Powell - from Mr. & Mrs. Smith	Peter Bosveld; Ilse Lans
Vivian Cardoso Gomez; Remy Vetter	Modern	"Your Song" - Ellie Goulding	Conny Janssen
Kalila Hermant; Denden Karadeniz	Hip-hop	"Don't You Worry Child" - Swedish House Mafia featuring John Martin	Steeve Austin

Show 5 Results

- 'Group Choreography: Top 10: 'Turn Around' - Conor Maynard featuring Ne-Yo (Hip-hop, Choreographer: Roy Julen)
- Solos:

Dancer	Style	Music	Results
Davinia Janssens	Jazz	"Breathe In Breathe Out" Mat Kearney	Safe
Delano Spenrath	Hip-hop	"Right Thing To Do" SBTRKT	Safe
Eliane Nsanze	Modern	"Kiss" - Prince and the Revolution	Eliminated
Frederic De Smet	Hip-hop	"C'mon (Catch 'em by Surprise)" - Tiesto vs. Diplo featuring Busta Rhymes	Safe
Vita Boers	Jazz	"Initiation" The Weeknd	Safe
Arno Brys	Modern	"Respawn 2 More Great Gamer Anthems" - from The Evolved	Safe
Vivian Cardoso Gomez	Jazz	"Mamma Knows Best" - Jessie J	Safe
Remy Vetter	Lyrical Hip-hop	"In For The Kill" - La Roux	Eliminated
Kalila Hermant	Hip-hop	"Massive Attack" - Nicki Minaj featuring Sean Garrett	Safe
Denden Karadeniz	Breakdance	"River Flows In You" - Yiruma	Safe

=== Live Show 6 (25 November 2012) ===
Couple	Style	Music	Choreographer
Kalila Hermant; Arno Brys	Hip-hop	"E.T." - Katy Perry featuring Kanye West	Steeve Austin
Vita Boers; Delano Spenrath	Modern	"Back to Black" - Amy Winehouse	Ed Wubbe
Davinia Janssens; Denden Karadeniz	Paso doble	"Introduction" Prince Negaafellaga	Fame Jana de Haan; Koen Brouwers
Vivian Cardoso Gomez; Frederic De Smet	Contemporary Hip Hop	"Nobody's Perfect" - Jessie J	Roy Julen

Show 6 Results

- 'Group Choreography: Top 8: "Come Together" - Kane (Hip-hop, Choreographer: Roy Julen)
- Solos:

Dancer	Style	Music	Results
Kalila Hermant	Hip-hop	"Birthday Cake" - Rihanna	Safe
Arno Brys	Modern	"Old Era"-Joker	Eliminated
Vita Boers	Jazz	"Starring Role" - Marina & The Diamonds	Eliminated
Delano Spenrath	Hip-hop	"Get Free" Major Lazer	Safe
Davinia Janssens	Jazz	"El Tango De Roxanne" - from Moulin Rouge!	Safe
Denden Karadeniz	Breakdance	"Rock with You" - Michael Jackson	Safe
Vivian Cardoso Gomez	Jazz	"When I Fall" - Lizz Wright	Safe
Frederic De Smet	Hip-hop	"Slow Dancing In A Burning Room" - John Mayer	Safe

=== Live Show 7 (2 December 2012) ===
Couple	Style	Music	Choreographer	Results
Kalila Hermant; Delano Spenrath	Cha-cha	"Do not Cha" - The Pussycat Dolls featuring Busta Rhymes	Fame Jana de Haan; Koen Brouwers	Delano Spenrath eliminated
Kalila Hermant; Delano Spenrath	Modern	"Have A Little Faith In Me" - John Hiatt	Conny Janssen	Delano Spenrath eliminated
Davinia Janssens; Frederic De Smet	Modern	"Je Suis Malade" - Lara Fabian	Isabelle Beernaert	Davinia Janssens eliminated
Davinia Janssens; Frederic De Smet	Viennese Waltz	"Three Days in a Row" - Anouk	Peter Bosveld; Ilse Lans	Davinia Janssens eliminated
Vivian Cardoso Gomez; Denden Karadeniz	Hip-hop	"Scream & Shout" - Will.i.am featuring Britney Spears	Steeve Austin	Safe
Vivian Cardoso Gomez; Denden Karadeniz	Jazz	"Need You Now" - Lady Antebellum	Laurent Flament	Safe

Show 7 Results

- 'Group Choreography: Top 6: "Beneath Your Beautiful" - Labrinth featuring Emeli Sande (Hip-hop, Choreographer: Roy Julen)
- 'Eliminated:'

Davinia Janssens ** Delano ** Spenrath

=== Finale (9 December 2012) ===
- 'Group Choreography: Top 18: "Bangarang" - Skrillex featuring Sirah (Hip Hop, Choreographer: Roy Julen)

Couple	Style	Music	Choreographer
Kalila Hermant; Denden Karadeniz	Quickstep	"Why Do not You" - Gramophonedzie	Fame Jana de Haan; Koen Brouwers
Vivian Cardoso Gomez; Frederic De Smet	Rumba	"My Immortal" - Evanescence	Peter Bosveld; Ilse Lans
Kalila Hermant; Frederic De Smet	Hip-hop	"Love Stoned" - Justin Timberlake	Steeve Austin
Vivian Cardoso Gomez; Denden Karadeniz	Modern	"All I Want" Koda-Line	Isabelle Beernaert
Vivian Cardoso Gomez; Kalila Hermant	Jazz	"I Was Here" - Beyoncé	Laurent Flament
Denden Karadeniz; Frederic De Smet	Hip-hop	"LE7ELS (Skrillex Remix)" - Avicii	Vincent Vianen

Final Results

- 'Group Choreography: The 14 dropouts: "All of the Lights" - Kanye West featuring Rihanna (Hip Hop, Choreographer: Roy Julen)
- 'Eliminated'

Denden Karadeniz **

- Solos:

Dancer	Style	Music	Results
Kalila Hermant	Hip-hop	"Won't Back Down" - Eminem featuring P!nk	Eliminated
Frederic De Smet	Hip-hop	"Lost Without You" - Robin Thicke	Safe
Vivian Cardoso Gomez	Jazz	"Feeling Good" - Michael Bublé	Safe

- 'Battle:'

Dancers	Style	Music
Vivian Cardoso Gomez; Frederic De Smet	Hip-hop / Jazz	"One (Your Name)" - Swedish House Mafia featuring Pharrell

- 'Runner-up'
  - Vivian Cardoso Gomez
- 'Winner:'
  - Frederic De Smet

== Theater tour ==
=== Tour Dates ===
Date	City	Country	Theatre
4 January 2013	Utrecht	Netherlands	Vredenburg
January 5, 2013	Utrecht	Netherlands	Vredenburg
11 January 2013	Heerlen	Netherlands	Royal Theater Heerlen
12 January 2013	Heerlen	Netherlands	Royal Theater Heerlen
17 January 2013	Groningen	Netherlands	MartiniPlaza
18 January 2013	Groningen	Netherlands	MartiniPlaza
21 January 2013	Amsterdam	Netherlands	RAI Amsterdam Convention Centre
22 January 2013	Amsterdam	Netherlands	RAI Amsterdam Convention Centre
25 January 2013	Rotterdam	Netherlands	Luxor Theater
26 January 2013	Rotterdam	Netherlands	Luxor Theater
1 February 2013	Antwerp	Belgium	Stadsschouwburg Antwerp
2 February 2013 ^{1}	Antwerp	Belgium	Stadsschouwburg Antwerp

- ^1: These dates have two shows. One at 5:00 PM and at 8:30 PM.
