= Arno Brys =

Belgian designer and graphic artist (1928–2025)

- Born: Arnold Jozef Maria Brys; 7 June 1928; Sijsele, Belgium
- Died: 28 August 2025 (aged 97); Bruges, Belgium
- Education: Higher Institute Sint-Lucas, Ghent
- Known for: Costumes, giants and floats for parades and processions; stained glass; graphic design
- Notable work: Designs for the Procession of the Golden Tree and the Procession of the Holy Blood
- Spouse: Beatrix Uleyn (m. 1955)

Arno Brys (born Arnold Jozef Maria Brys; 7 June 1928 – 28 August 2025) was a Belgian draughtsman, graphic artist and designer.

Brys was best known as a designer of parades and processions. He drew costumes, flags, giants and floats. His best-known work was for the Procession of the Golden Tree and the Procession of the Holy Blood in Bruges. He also designed stained glass windows, murals, posters and occasional graphics.

== Biography ==
=== Early life and education ===
Arno Brys grew up in Ostend. He came from the large family of Leon Brys (1897–1975) and Veneranda Salens (1903–1992). He went to school at the Onze-Lieve-Vrouwecollege in Ostend. As a child, he admired the woodcuts of Jozef Cantré and Victor Stuyvaert. He was also very interested in the work of James Ensor.

In 1944–1945, the family was evacuated from the restricted coastal zone. The family then lived for a time in Zwijnaarde. There, Brys won a competition for a float for the liberation celebrations. This was his first commission.

Brys studied at the Higher Institute Sint-Lucas in Ghent. He graduated in 1951 with the highest distinction. He learned heraldry, etching, ceramics and glass art there. During his studies, he already drew posters. He also made illustrations for newspapers and for the weekly magazine Tintin.

=== Career ===
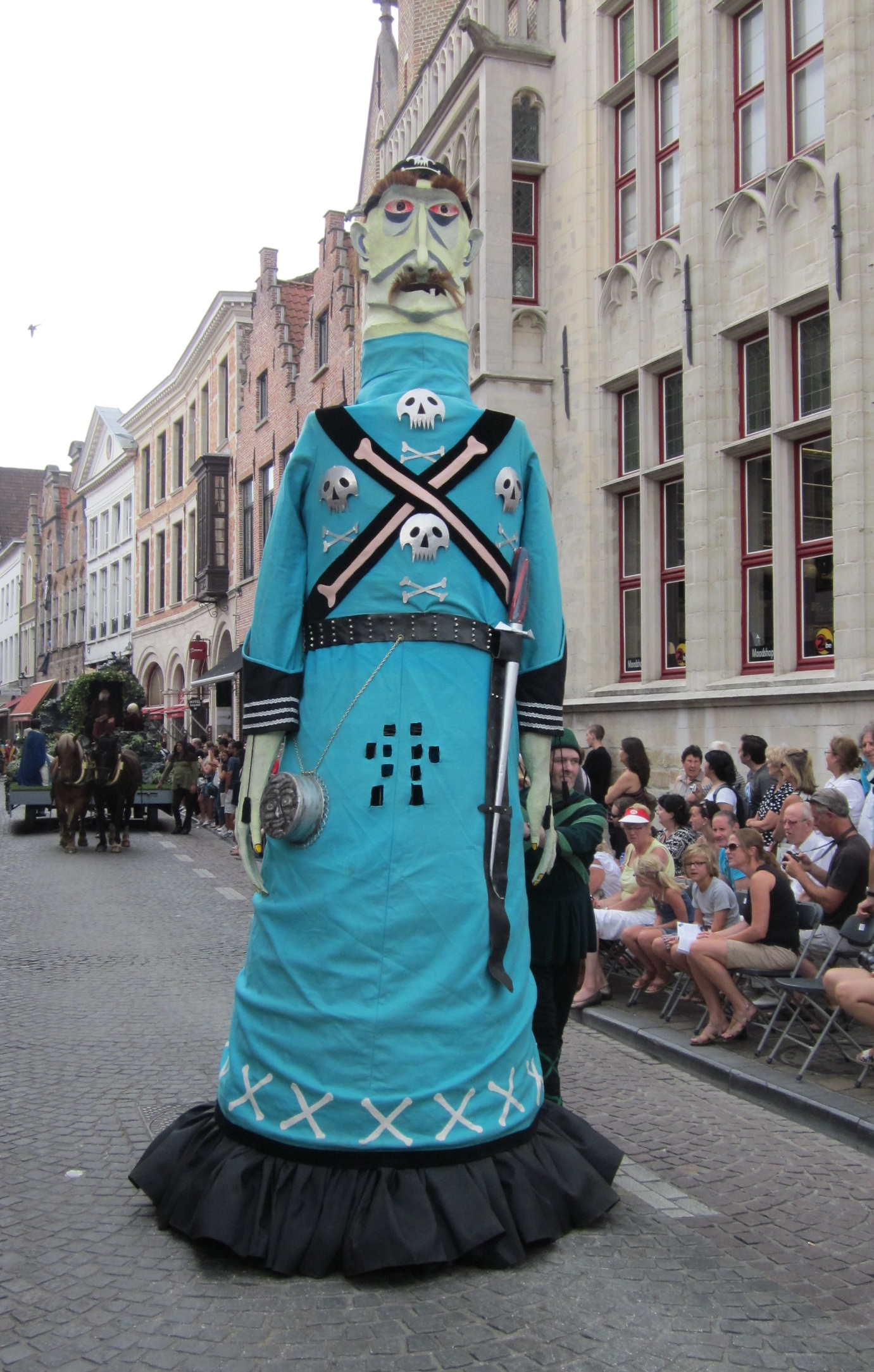
The giant Grimminck in the Procession of the Golden Tree, designed by Brys

Brys taught at the art academy of Roeselare (1952–1963). He also taught at the Higher Institute Sint-Lucas in Ghent (1952–1990), now part of LUCA School of Arts. There, he founded the department of functional graphic design in 1972.

In 1955, Brys married the artist and tapestry embroiderer Beatrix Uleyn. The couple settled in Bruges. They had five children. The architect Jan Tanghe designed their house and studio in Sint-Andries. The house is called Evenhoghe and was built in 1959. It received the Van de Ven architecture prize.

Brys became known above all as a designer of parades, processions and open-air plays. He designed costumes, flags, processional giants, floats and parade boats. From 1958, he redesigned the Procession of the Golden Tree. He designed hundreds of costumes, six giants, a dragon and several floats for it. He was also the artistic supervisor of this parade for some years.

In 1969, the future of the Procession of the Holy Blood seemed under threat. Brys and Antoon Viaene worked to renew the procession. Together with the city of Bruges, they drew up a ten-year plan. Brys drew the costumes, the flags and the props. Many of his designs are still in use.

Brys also conceived large historical pageants, such as the Great Tournament in Bruges (1974) and the Great Parade in Zeebrugge (1995). He also worked for the Breughel parade in Wingene, the Saint Godelieve procession in Gistel, the flower parade of Blankenberge and the giants' parade of Wenduine. Other commissions came from Roeselare, Veurne, Deinze, Oostduinkerke and Turnhout.

Brys also made stained glass windows and murals. In 1953, he completed murals in the Redemptorist church in Roeselare. He designed stained glass windows for the town hall of Ypres (1970–1971) and for the Church of Saint Bertin in Poperinge (1975–1980). He also designed the Peace Window in St Martin's Cathedral, Ypres (1993–1994). For the Church of Saint Nicholas in Slijpe, in Middelkerke, he drew stained glass windows and a mural about the Knights Templar (2007–2014).

Brys also produced much graphic work. He drew posters, bookplates, birth and New Year cards, menus and book illustrations. He also made etchings and large works on paper in mixed media.

Brys had to defend his copyright several times. In 1989, he took legal action against the city council of Bruges. In 2003, the court of appeal ruled in his favour.

=== Legacy ===
In early 2022, Musea Brugge bought a large collection of his work. It includes about 150 designs for costumes and giants. It also includes design drawings for banners, sets, floats and boats, as well as posters and programme booklets. The works are intended for exhibitions and for the Folklore Museum in Bruges. The Yper Museum in Ypres holds a 1968 design drawing for the stained glass window in the town hall.

Arno Brys died in August 2025. He was 97 years old.

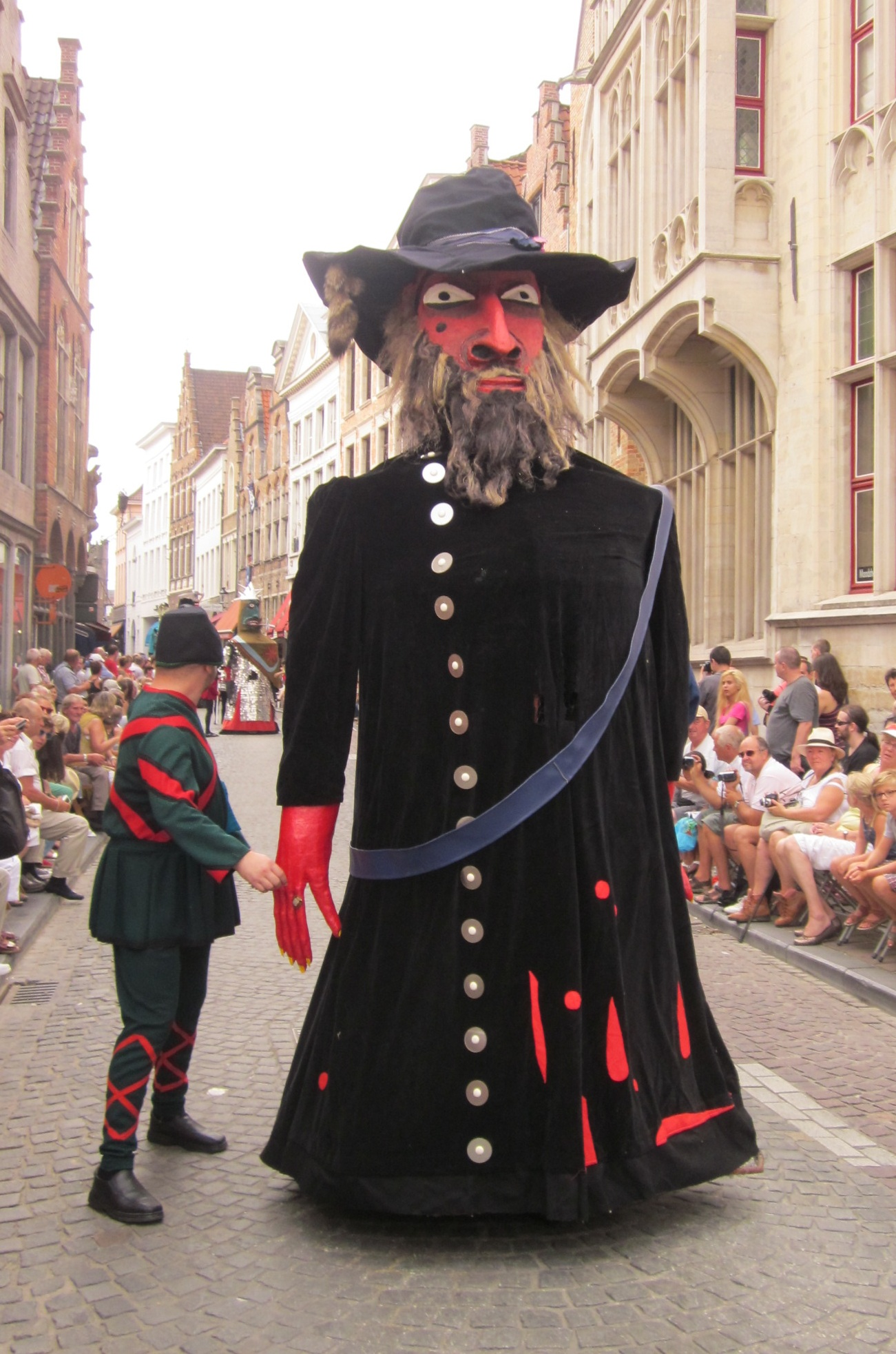
The giant Grauwelinck

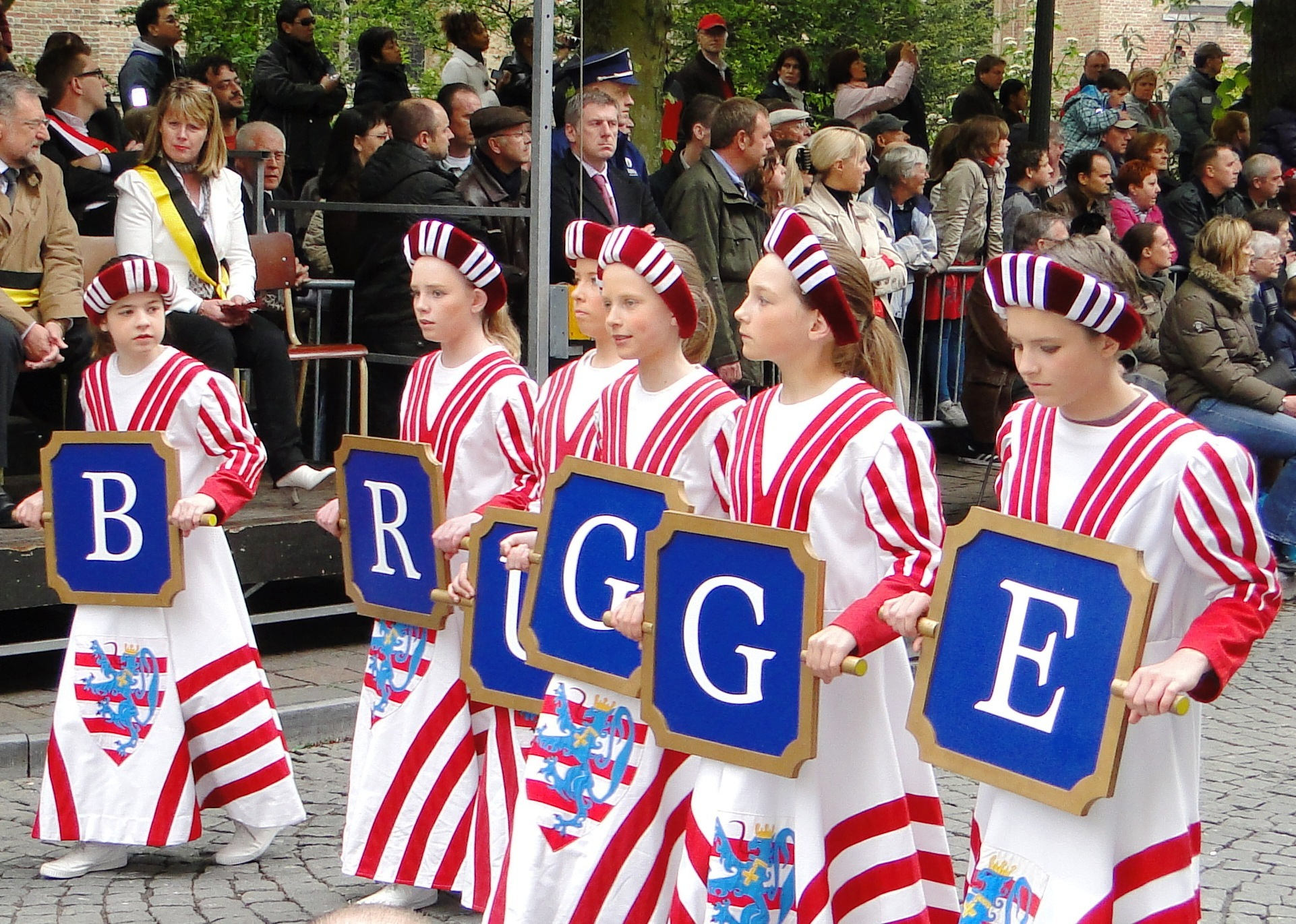
The Procession of the Holy Blood in Bruges
