= Hedwig Swimberghe =

Belgian musician

Hedwig Swimberghe (born 1950, Bruges) is a Belgian clarinetist who leads the Brussels Clarinet choir, and formerly taught at the Royal Conservatory of Brussels. He also was principal clarinetist for the Brussels Philharmonic.

He was born in Bruges, where he attended the conservatory. He then went on to study at the Royal Conservatory of Ghent under Jean Tastenoe, and later studied in Berlin with Karl Leister.

He has been the recipient of numerous awards, such as Maurice Van Guchte Prize, the Benelux Prize, the International Tromp Competition Eindhoven, and the Concours International du Festival de Musique de Toulon. He also has founded, served on the jury, or served as a faculty member for numerous ensembles, festivals, and competitions, including the Brussels Clarinet Choir, the Belgium Woodwind Quintet, the Calane Clarinet Quartet, the Clarinettissimo Festival, the International Clarinet Festival and Competition of Ávila, and the Julian Menendez Clarinet Choir Festival.

He was married to choreographer Olivia Geerolf, who died in 2023.
