= Procession of the Golden Tree =

Historical pageant in Bruges, Belgium

Procession of the Golden Tree Praalstoet van de Gouden Boom
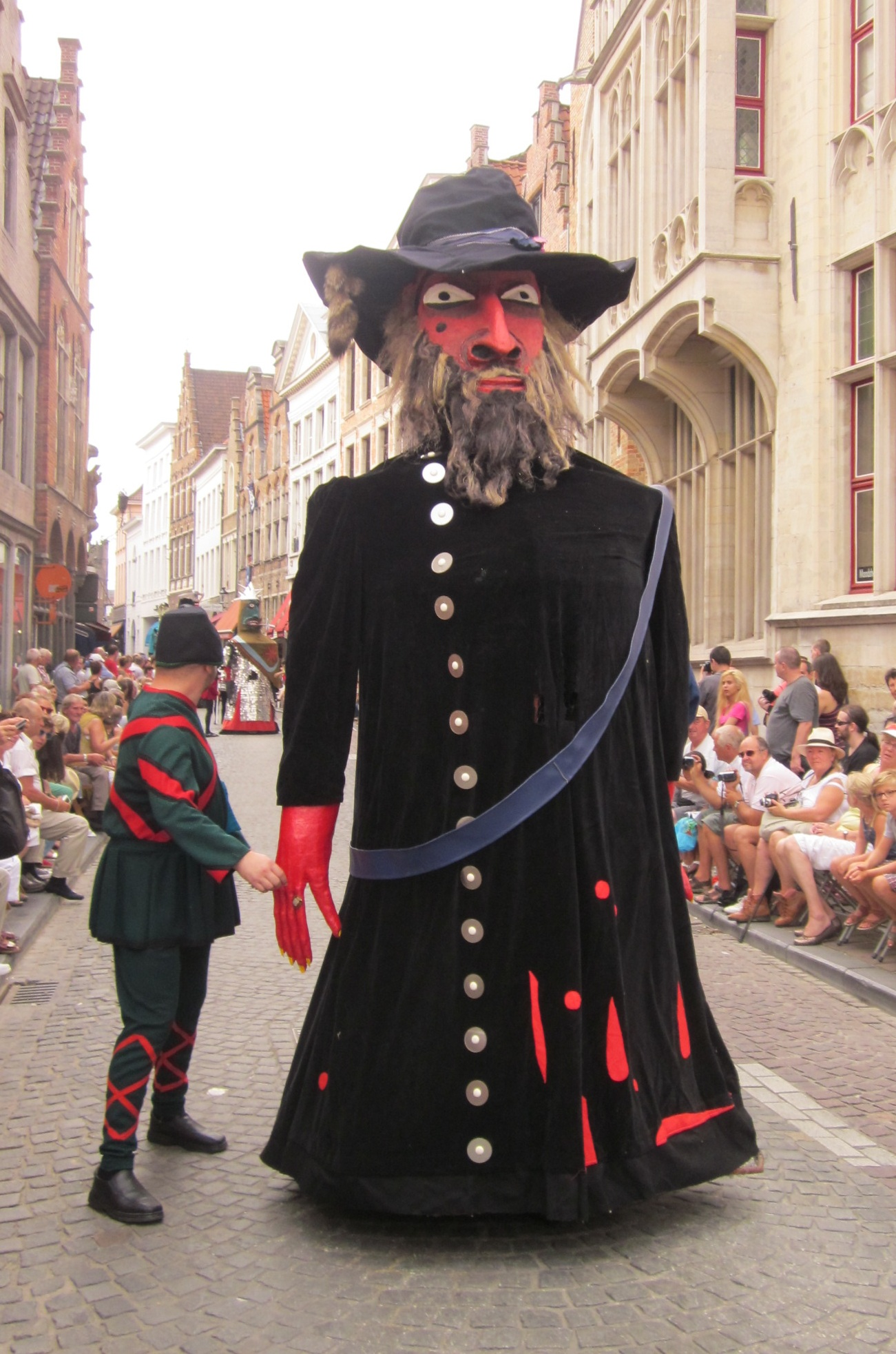
- Giant Grauwelinck in the 2012 procession
- Status: Active
- Genre: Historical re-enactment
- Date: August (formerly July)
- Frequency: Every five years
- Location: Bruges
- Country: Belgium
- Inaugurated: 1958
- Next event: 2024
- Participants: About 2,000

The Procession of the Golden Tree (Dutch: Praalstoet van de Gouden Boom) or Pageant of the Golden Tree (Dutch: Gouden Boomstoet) is a historical pageant held in Bruges, Belgium, every five years to commemorate the celebrations held there in July 1468 for the wedding of Charles the Bold and Margaret of York. It has been organised since 1958.

The heraldic shields of challengers at the 1468 tournament were placed on a golden artificial tree at the lists. The 1468 event included a banquet. Madame de Beaugrant, a dwarf, rode into the chamber on an automata made like a golden lion, and was placed on the top table as a gift to Margaret of York.

The procession that was to have been held in 2022 was postponed until 25 August 2024 while the format was revamped.

== See also ==
- Kattenstoet
- Ommegang of Brussels
- Procession of the Holy Blood
