= Aglaja (dance company) =

Dance company and academy from Bruges, Belgium

Aglaja was a dance company and academy from Bruges, Belgium. Aglaja was founded in 1967 by the choreographer and teacher Jan Dewulf. Aglaja emerged as a follow-up of multiple artistic groups including "Keurgroep S.F.X." which already existed in the Bruges school of the Xaverian Brothers. At first, Aglaja was led by brother Albert Maenhoudt and later Jan Dewulf took over.

The repertoire was mainly (light) classical music, including Johann Sebastian Bach, Hungarian Dances (Brahms) 1, 3, 5, 6, 7 and 17, Slavonic Dances from Antonín Dvořák and "Uittocht der vissers" from Belgian composer Willy Ostijn, but also popular music such as "Let It Be" from The Beatles and "Sweet Caroline" from Neil Diamond.
