= Procession of the Holy Blood =

Catholic procession on Ascension Day in Bruges, Belgium

Procession of the Holy Blood Heilig Bloedprocessie
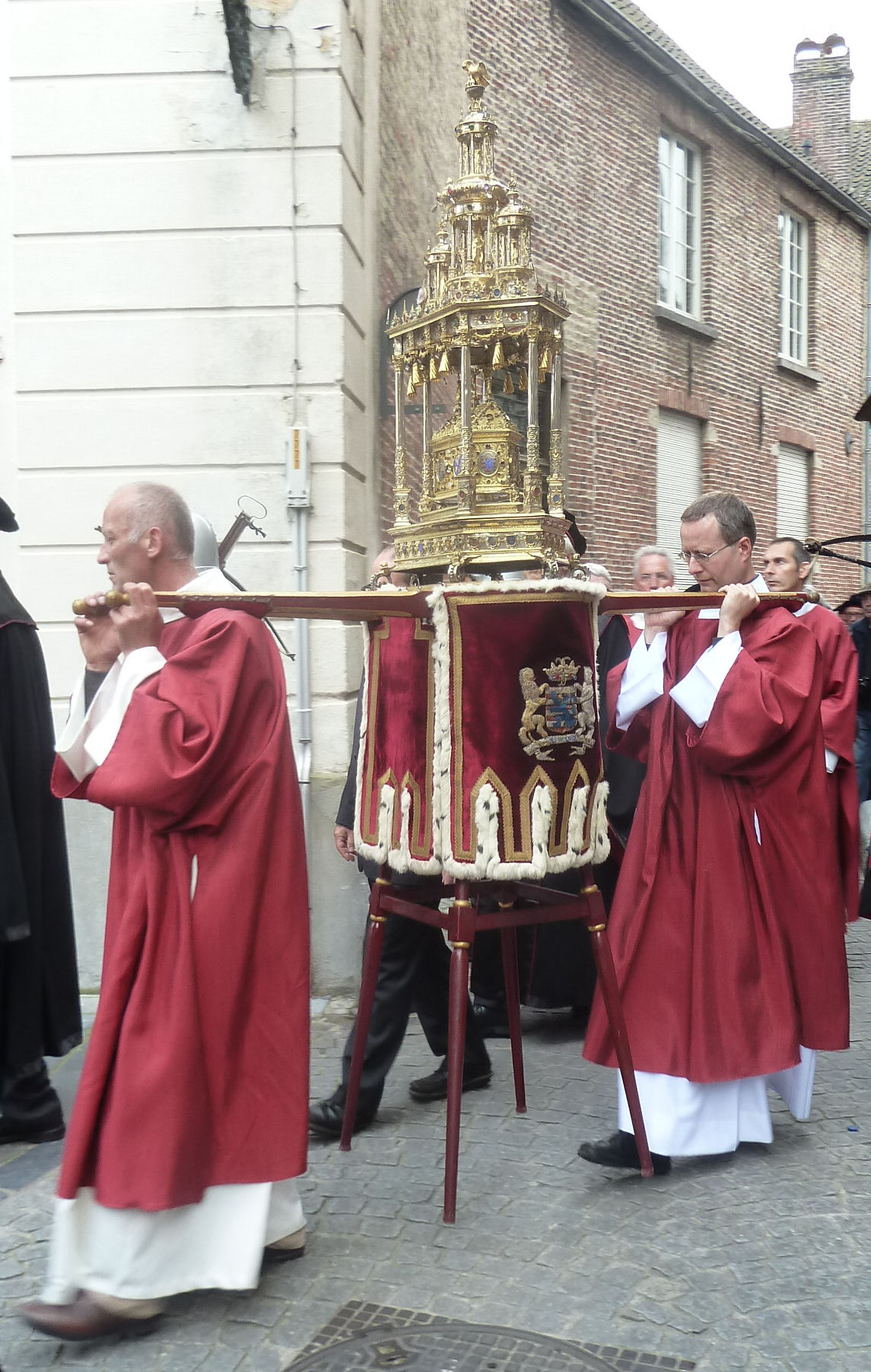
- Procession of the Holy Blood, 2014
- Status: Active
- Genre: Procession
- Date: Ascension Day
- Frequency: Annual
- Locations: Bruges, Belgium

Procession of the Holy Blood in Bruges
- UNESCO Intangible Cultural Heritage
- Country: Belgium
- Reference: 00263
- Region: Europe and North America

Inscription history
- Inscription: 2009 (4th session)
- List: Representative

The Procession of the Holy Blood (Dutch: Heilig Bloedprocessie) is a large religious Catholic procession, dating back to the Middle Ages, which takes place each Ascension Day in Bruges, Belgium. In 2009, it was included in the UNESCO Representative List of the Intangible Cultural Heritage of Humanity.

== History ==
The Procession of the Holy Blood seems to have emerged as a civic ceremony by the late thirteenth century. By 1303, if not earlier, the ceremonial procession carried the holy blood relic around the perimeter of the city walls, completed in 1297. The procession commemorates the deliverance of the city, by the national heroes Jan Breydel and Pieter de Coninck, from French tyranny in May of the previous year. It takes place on Ascension Day, as one of the great religious celebrations in Belgium. Residents of the area perform an historical reenactment of the phial's arrival together with similar dramatizations of Biblical events. The passion play Jeu du Saint Sang takes place every five years. Sixty to one hundred thousand spectators watch the procession, a parade of historical scenes and biblical stories. Choirs, dance groups (e.g., dance theatre Aglaja), animals (ranging from geese to camels), horse-drawn floats and small plays with many actors pass by within a couple of hours.

The centerpiece is the Relic with the Precious Blood of Jesus. The traditional account holds that Joseph of Arimathea wiped the blood-stained face of the dead Christ and carefully preserved the cloth, which was later, after the 12th century Second Crusade supposedly brought to the city by Thierry, Count of Flanders, who had received it from Baldwin III of Jerusalem in recognition of his bravery. However, an alternative view says after the Sack of Constantinople in 1204, during the Fourth Crusade, Baldwin, Count of Flanders was chosen emperor and sent looted relics to Flanders. His two daughters lived at Bruges. The earliest documentation of the Holy blood relic dates from 1256.

In 2015 the procession was cancelled, a few hours before it was scheduled to start, due to bad weather. In 2020 it was cancelled from health concerns due to the COVID-19 pandemic.

== Pilgrimage ==
More than 3,000 Bruges residents participate in the spectacle, which is also called "Brugges Schoonste Dag" (Dutch, "The Most Beautiful Day in Bruges"). Bruges residents used to decorate their facades with flags in the colours of the city and country. The event retains its formal spiritual aspect. Every year, the bishop and governor invite important diplomatic guests. Among the most famous guests were the archbishop of Krakow, Cardinal Wojtyła (later Pope John Paul II), in 1973 and Cardinal Wiseman in 1849. Many bishops, priests and nuns from all over the world come to celebrate this famous procession. In the morning, a pontifical Mass is celebrated in the cathedral, and, in the afternoon, the procession takes place. Clergy carry the relic on their shoulders, guarded by the brotherhood. When the relic of the Holy Blood passes by, the crowd becomes still and silent in reverence. In 2009, the event was inscribed in the UNESCO Representative List of the Intangible Cultural Heritage of Humanity.

== Gallery ==
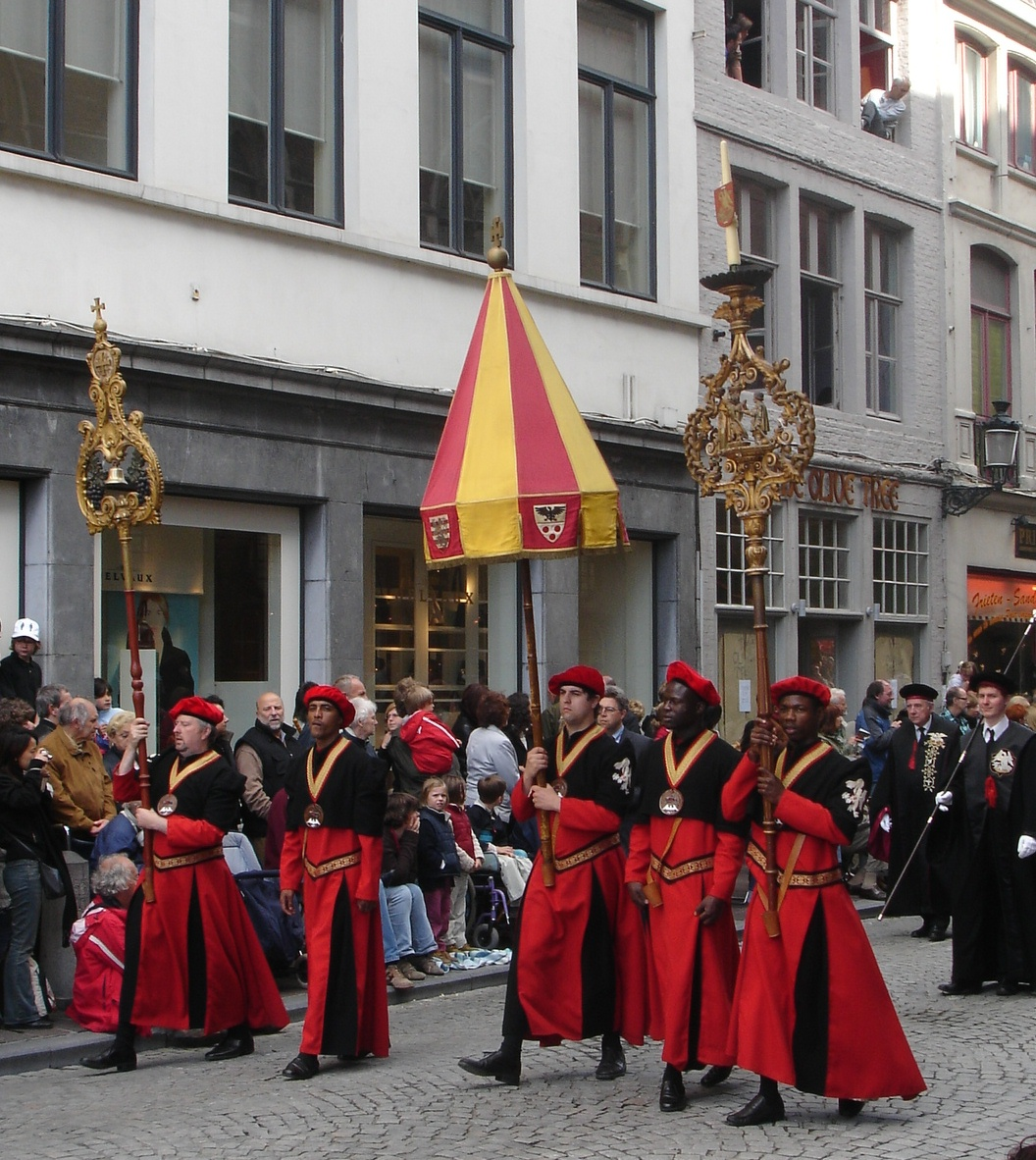
The conopeum, solemnly carried during the procession

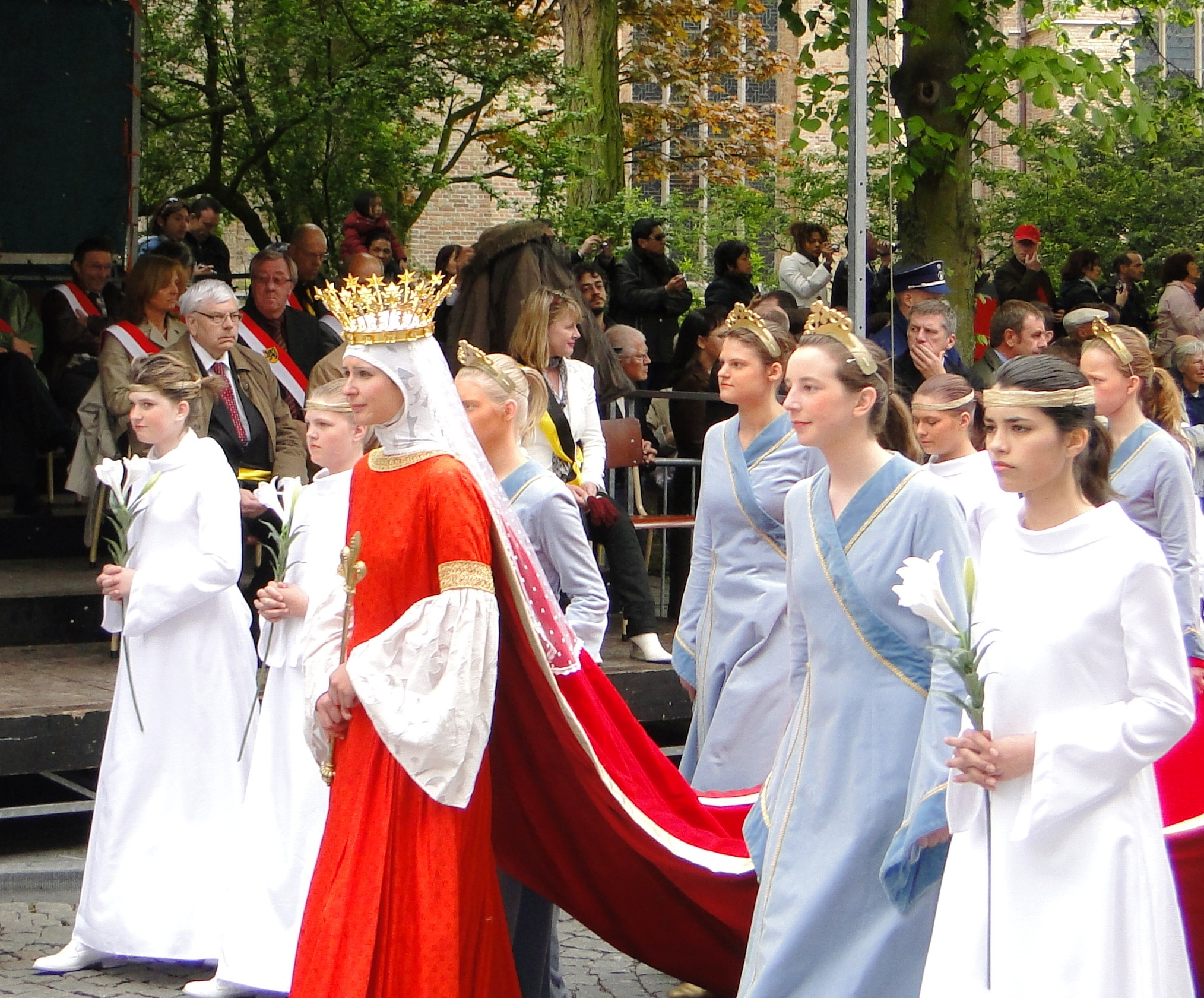
Representation of the Virgin Mary during the procession, May 2010

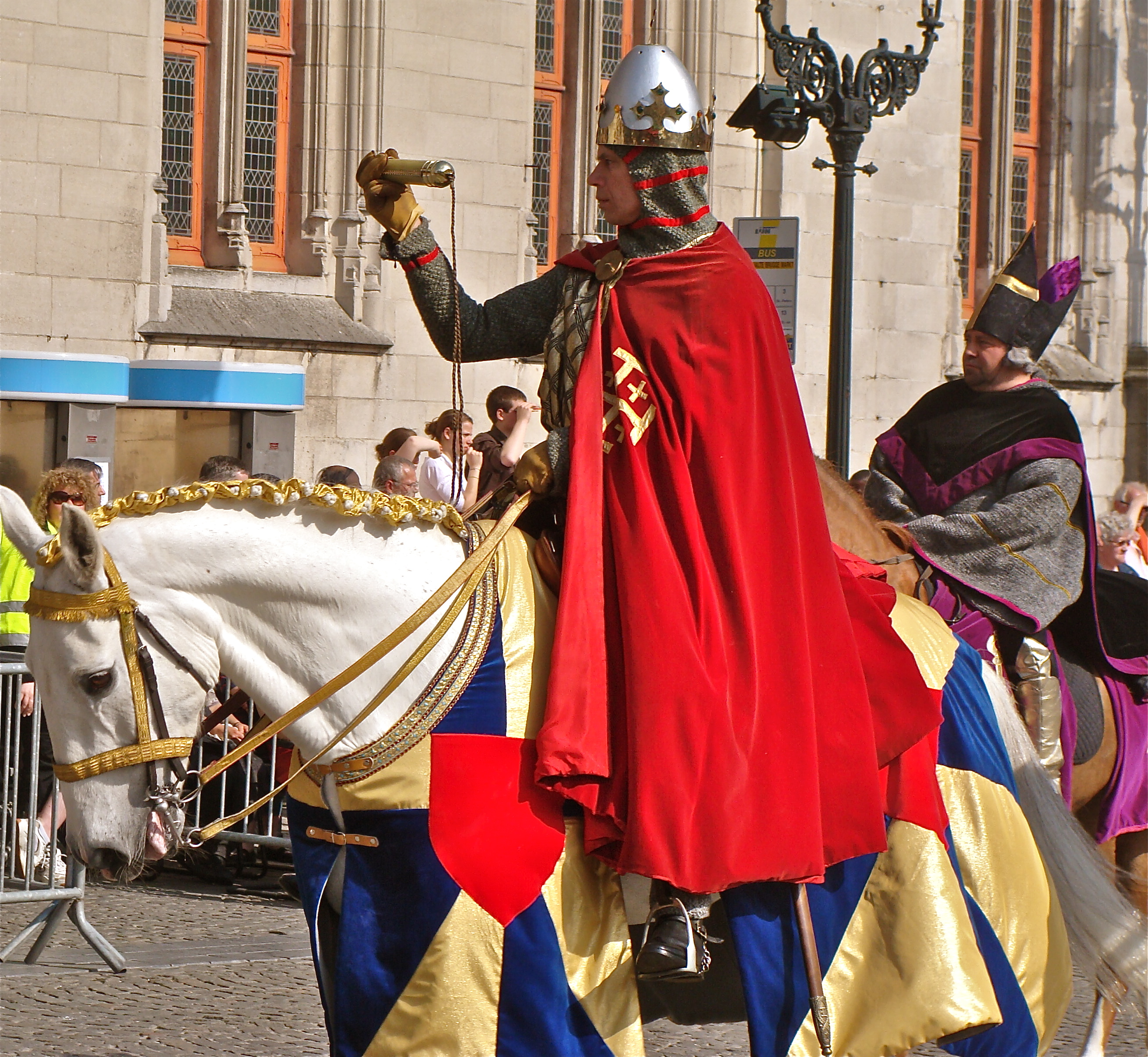
The history of the relic is performed for thousands.

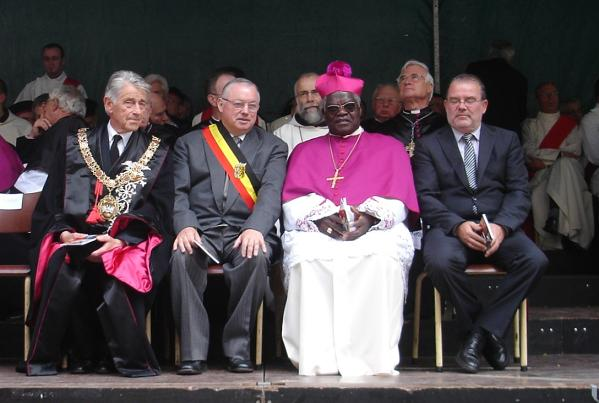
Laurent Monsengwo Pasinya on the official viewing stand

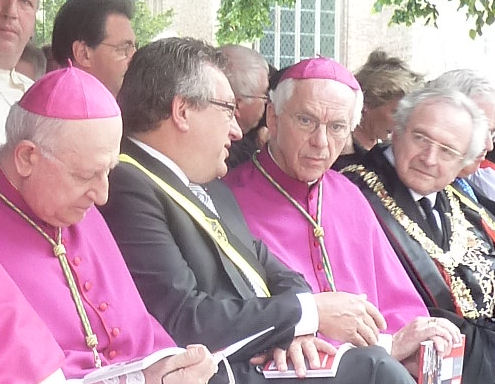
Mgr De Kesel receives his high guests.

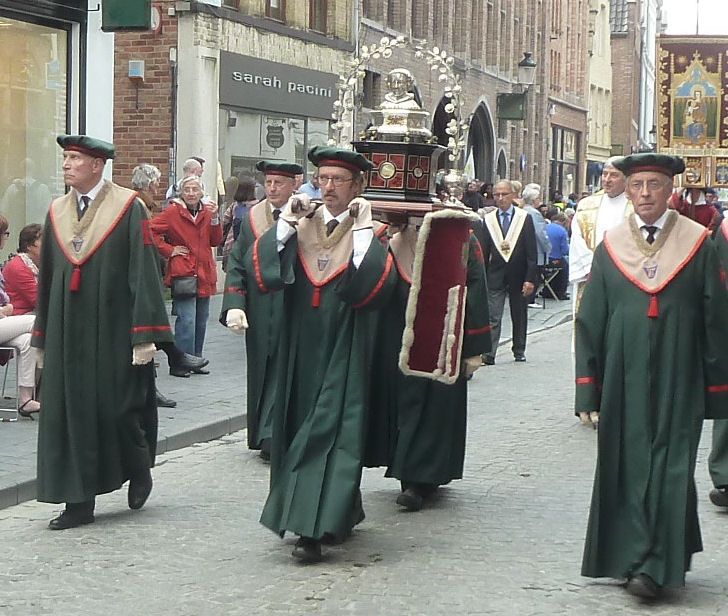
Other relics are carried in the procession.

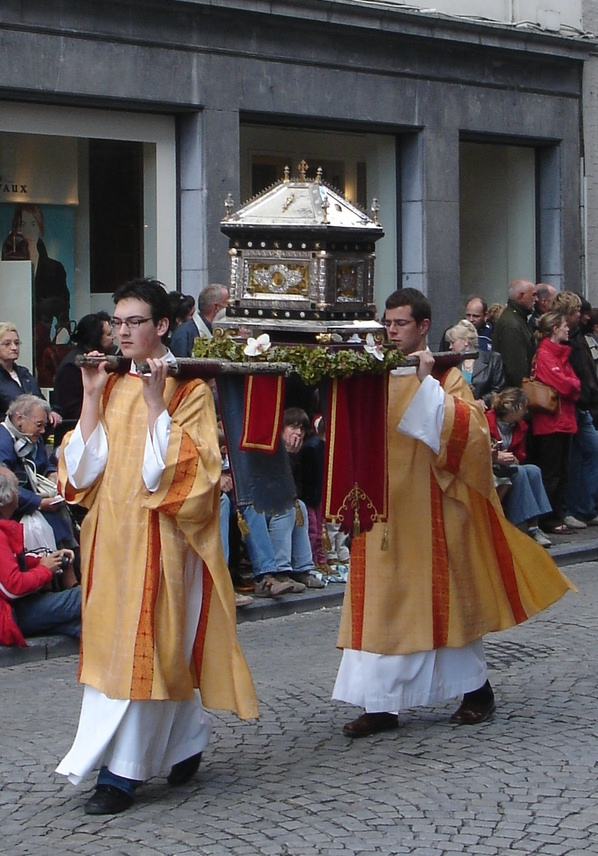
Saint Donatus of Reims, patron of the diocese
