= Rodeo: Four Dance Episodes =

Ballet by Justin Peck to music by Aaron Copland

- Choreographer: Justin Peck
- Music: Aaron Copland
- Premiere: February 4, 2015; David H. Koch Theater
- Original ballet company: New York City Ballet
- Design: Reid Bartelme; Harriet Jung; Justin Peck; Brandon Stirling Baker

Rodeo: Four Dance Episodes (also stylized as Rōdē,ō: Four Dance Episodes) is a one-act ballet choreographed by Justin Peck to "Four Dance Episodes" from Copland's Rodeo. The ballet premiered on February 4, 2015, at the David H. Koch Theater, danced by the New York City Ballet.

== Production ==
When Peck made Rodeo: Four Dance Episodes, he had only been appointed resident choreographer of the New York City Ballet months ago. Reid Bartelme, Harriet Jung and Peck designed the costumes, and Brandon Stirling Baker designed the lighting. The ballet features a woman and fifteen men. Peck said it is an "invert" of romantic ballet, which usually has one man and a female corps de ballet.

Peck's Rodeo: Four Dance Episodes is set to "Four Dance Episodes" from Copland's Rodeo, which was originally written for Agnes de Mille's 1942 ballet of the same name. Peck claimed he saw the de Mille version performed by the American Ballet Theatre three years prior, and several different versions at the New York Public Library for the Performing Arts, before making his own. He said he "wanted to understand what she did" but not let de Mille's choreography "loom over" him. On why he chose this score, he said it was due to the "kinetic energy that it embodies" and "it also felt deep enough for the exploration of an entirely different ballet, one that didn’t snub or get in the way of the Agnes de Mille original." He also deliberately chose to use the concert score.

The night before the premiere, dancer Andrew Veyette injured himself while performing George Balanchine's Donizetti Variations, so Peck, who was still dancing at the time, cast himself in Veyette's role in the first movement of Rodeo, while Sean Suozzi replaced Veyette in the fourth movement. Peck went on stage before the premiere to explain the situation.

San Francisco Ballet has also performed Peck's Rodeo.

== Original cast ==
Original cast:

- Sara Mearns
- Amar Ramasar
- Gonzalo Garcia
- Justin Peck
- Sean Suozzi
- Daniel Ulbricht
- Daniel Applebaum
- Craig Hall
- Allen Peiffer
- Andrew Scordato
- Taylor Stanley

== Reception ==
On the premiere, the New York Times wrote that "the work’s energy, charm, inventiveness, musicality and polish proved irresistible" despite Veyette's injury. The reviewer particularly singled out the second movement male quintet with Applebaum, Hall, Peiffer, Scordato and Stanley for bringing "Peck’s most haunting poetry." In a 4-star review, the Financial Times commented the ballet has "unsettling moments," though "these scenes did not change the ballet’s temperature."

The men in the ballet were listed in Pointe Magazine's "Top 12 Standout Performances of 2015".

== Awards and nominations ==
| Year | Award | Category | Recipients and nominees | Result | Ref. |
|---|---|---|---|---|---|
| 2015 | Bessie Awards | Outstanding Production | Justin Peck | Won | |
| 2016 | Prix Benois de la Danse | Choreographers | Justin Peck | Nominated | |
| 2016 | Prix Benois de la Danse | Female Dancers | Sara Mearns | Nominated | |
| 2016 | Prix Benois de la Danse | Male Dancers | Amar Ramasar | Nominated | |
