= Everywhere We Go (ballet) =

Ballet choreographed by Justin Peck

- Choreographer: Justin Peck
- Music: Sufjan Stevens
- Premiere: May 8, 2014; David H. Koch Theater
- Original ballet company: New York City Ballet
- Design: Janie Taylor; Karl Jensen; Brandon Stirling Baker

Everywhere We Go is a ballet choreographed by Justin Peck and scored by Sufjan Stevens. The ballet is plotless, danced by a cast of 25 and features nine sections. This is the second collaboration between Peck and Stevens, following Year of the Rabbit (2012). Everywhere We Go was created for the New York City Ballet (NYCB), and premiered on May 8, 2014, at the David H. Koch Theater, during NYCB's spring gala. The success of the ballet led to Peck's appointment as resident choreographer of NYCB, as the second person to hold the position.

== Development ==
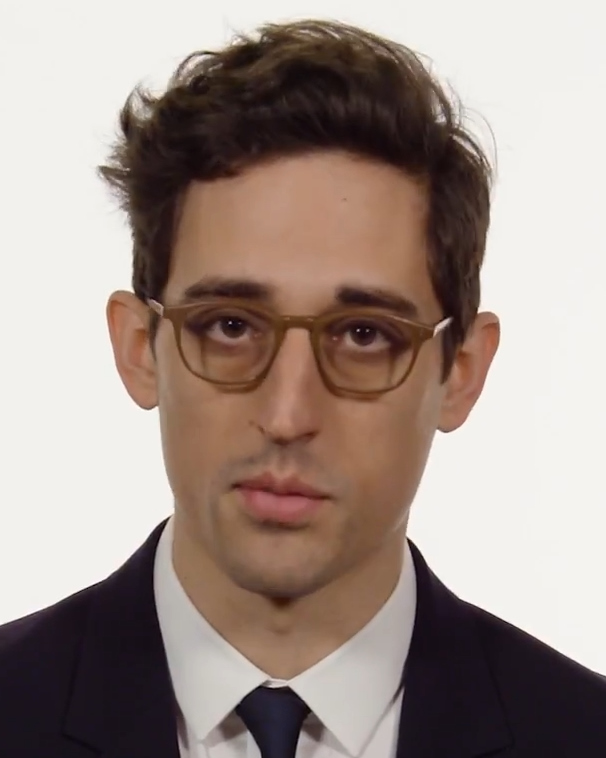
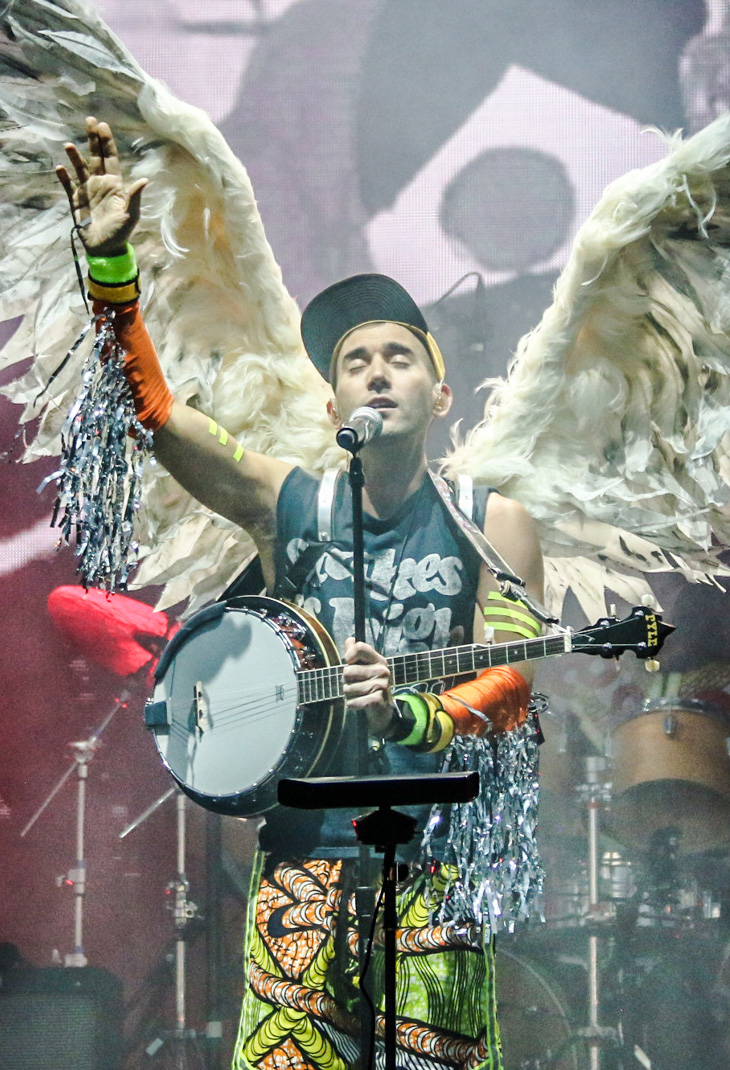
Choreographer Justin Peck (top) and composer Sufjan Stevens (bottom)

Choreographer Justin Peck and indie singer-songwriter Sufjan Stevens first collaborated on Year of the Rabbit (2012), which is set to the latter's album Enjoy Your Rabbit, for the New York City Ballet. Stevens initially hated ballet, but Peck convinced him to watch various ballets and be educated on the art form. He ultimately agreed to let Peck use his album, and Year of the Rabbit received critical acclaim. After Year of the Rabbit, Peck suggested to Stevens that they collaborate again, this time with original music. Stevens was initially hesitant as he rarely works with large organizations like the NYCB, and he was unsure whether he had any ideas, but he agreed to working on another ballet anyway. This would be Peck's sixth piece for NYCB. Peck and Stevens' attempted to have a conceptual conversation about the score would be, though they ultimately decided to start working on the ballet without a concept. However, they decide to make the ballet plotless since Peck mainly choreographs abstract ballets.

When composing, Stevens would upload sketches he wrote on the piano or guitar on a server for Peck, with suggestions for the steps or which dancer perform that part, and Peck would develop the choreography from Stevens' ideas, then show it to him. The two also had what Stevens called a "veto system", with Peck rejecting compositions he found not suitable. Stevens said, "A lot of the music is developed from repetition and rhythmic variation and counting—not just time signatures, but an emphasis on dynamics and accents. It’s not technically difficult, but lends itself to the athleticism and technicality of City Ballet." Peck also noted "There has been a lot of dialogue back and forth about the structure of the dance, and what is happening during certain moments in the music." The score was arranged by Michael P. Atkinson. Peck and Stevens went through the orchestration "in a very meticulous way." Stevens conceived the title of the ballet and the subtitles for the nine sections, which Peck called "placeholder" titles for Stevens. Comparing the process between songwriting and composing a ballet, Stevens found that in songwriting "you just follow the muse, narrative, the melody, and this inherent story", but "writing for ballet is much more utilitarian, so I have a greater consideration for rhythm and movement and dynamic with very exact functions." Stevens called his experience on this ballet as "kind of power pop and really, really dynamic and celebratory and unabashedly fun."

Janie Taylor was approached by Peck to design the costumes. Taylor, who retired as principal of NYCB in early 2014, often made her own leotards in classes. She was supervised by Marc Happel, the head of NYCB's costume department. When Taylor designed the costumes, she only heard the music, and Peck provided ideas on he wanted the costumes look like. She only saw the choreography after the designs were complete. The women are dressed in striped leotards, while the men are in black and grey attires, both with a red band at the waist. She had the women wear dyed white pointe shoes, even though she knew that the dancers do not like them, and she personally felt the dyed shoes are harder than the typical pink ones.

The decor is designed by architect and artist Karl Jensen, who had no prior experience with set design. The set featured two muslin drops, dyed in three tones with patterned cutouts, and forms different patterns as the drops move up and down. Brandon Stirling Baker, a frequent collaborator of Peck, designed the lighting.

In April 2014, few weeks before the premiere of Everywhere We Go, the New York City Ballet released a short film of the ballet featuring Tiler Peck, Teresa Reichlen and Amar Ramasar. It was directed by Jody Lee Lipes, who worked with Peck on the documentary Ballet 422. The same month, few excerpts and some of its designs were revealed at Work & Process at the Guggenheim.

== Choreography and music ==
The ballet contains nine sections:

1. The Shadows Will Fall Behind
2. Happiness Is a Perfume
3. I Breathe the Air of Mountains and Their Unapproachable Heights
4. To Live in the Hearts We Leave Behind
5. There Is Always the Sunshine
6. Every Flower That Stirs the Elastic Sod
7. I Am in the House and I Have the Key
8. The Gate of Heaven Is Love
9. Thanks to the Human Heart by Which We Live

The ballet is danced by four principal women, three principal men, three demi-soloist couples, and a corps de ballet of six men and six women. The ballet is plotless. Dance critic Zoë Anderson called the ballet "full of variety and changing moods." She described "Corps and soloists often overlap, with principals emerging from the group and merging back into it." She also noted, "Everywhere We Go emphasises the ensemble, which will interrupt duets or spin its own complex patterns. The title suggests a sense of shared community, which also appears in how the dancers interact"

For The Oxford Handbook of Contemporary Ballet, Mindy Aloff wrote, "Everywhere We Go is built on images of community, tribes, and group ritual, but it is cast with an attention to hierarchy," for its division between the principal dancers and the corps. Aloff noted one of the principal woman, often performed by a taller dancer, never partners with others and "serves as a kind of muse or guiding ideal." Aloff found that "Several sustained pas de deux present different kinds of relationships." She also observed that "The ballerinas, as in Balanchine's works, are given real technical challenges, from all parts of the classical lexicon."

Both Aloff and Anderson noted a motif in the ballet, which occurs twice, when the dancers are scattered on stage, they begin to fall, but other dancers catch them. Peck explained this scene to Aloff, "There is something shocking and jarring about seeing someone who is healthy have the life leave the body. You remember how fleeting life is and how fragile we are. This is a superhuman ballet, and I wanted to remind the audience that these are human beings—and they're all going to die. But no one hits the ground alone."

On the score, Pitchfork described "it wasn’t just the instrumentation that sounded like Stevens. The same weird chord progressions that cast a theme of doomed hopefulness over Stevens' work, from his quiet folk songs to his grander, louder pieces, was present here. Just when things start to get dark in a Sufjan Stevens song, he’ll throw in a wink of humor to add some levity, in the form of an unusual sound or beat." Like the choreography, there are also motifs in the score, such as "A series of steady piano notes at the root of a song."

== Original cast ==
The principal dancers in the original cast were:

- Maria Kowroski
- Sterling Hyltin
- Tiler Peck
- Teresa Reichlen
- Robert Fairchild
- Andrew Veyette
- Amar Ramasar

== Performances ==
Everywhere We Go premiered on May 8, 2014, at the David H. Koch Theater, during the company's spring gala, conducted by Michael P. Atkinson.

The Australian Ballet debuted the ballet in September 2022.

== Critical reception ==
New York Times dance critic Alastair Macaulay commented, "a work both diffuse and brilliant whose rich supply of configurations, phrases and rhythms often (if not always) suggests that young Mr. Peck can do anything he wants with choreography: a virtuoso of the form." For DanceTabs, Marina Harss wrote, "Like Paz de la Jolla and Year of the Rabbit before it, Everwhere We Go is ingenious, imaginative, fast-paced, complex, densely packed. Peck has the mind of a mathematician; he finds ways to subdivide the stage and keep the eye continually guessing... The body is also subdivided in surprising ways... And he hears everything in the music, peeling away layers and showing sounds we might otherwise miss."
