= In Creases =

Ballet choreographed by Justin Peck

- Choreographer: Justin Peck
- Music: Philip Glass
- Premiere: July 14, 2012; Saratoga Performing Arts Center
- Original ballet company: New York City Ballet
- Design: Justin Peck; Marc Happel; Brandon Stirling Baker

In Creases is a ballet choreographed by Justin Peck, his first for the New York City Ballet, to Philip Glass' "Four Movements for Two Pianos". The ballet premiered on July 14, 2012, at the Saratoga Performing Arts Center, during the company's annual season there, and had its New York City premiere on May 29, 2013.

== Production ==
=== Background ===
In Creases is the first ballet then-New York City Ballet corps de ballet member Justin Peck made for the company, though he had already choreographed at the New York Choreographic Institute for several years. He originally expected his first "big opportunity" would be Year of the Rabbit, but was commissioned to make an expansion of a piece originally made for the institute.

=== Choreography and music ===
The title of the ballet is a pun, a comment on the music and what Peck "wanted to do structurally with the choreography." The ballet is set to Philip Glass' Four Movements for Two Pianos, which was composed in 2008. Peck was initially hesitant in using a score by Glass as many choreographers had used Glass' music before, but opted to use it anyway because Peck believed it was "very good danceable music" and "a little bit more expansive than usual."

In the choreography, Peck "attempted to have the dancers consume as much space as possible, then moved on to how I could divide and fold or crease the space using the bodies of the dancers." According to Peck, the choreography is largely inspired by the score and incorporates two scientific concepts: withdrawal reflex and the relation of magnetic poles.

The cast consists of eight dancers and two onstage pianists. Compared with the Choreographic Institute, the rehearsal schedule for a main stage production is far more unpredictable and Peck would only receive the schedule the days beforehand, therefore he "was freaking out a little." While choreographing, he was also rehearsing and performing other ballets.

=== Designs ===
Peck and Marc Happel, head of the company costume department, designed the costumes. Peck said he wrote down his ideas for costumes and proposed different color palette options to Happel. As there were "no budget" for the costumes, Peck went to the company warehouse, hoping to "recycle or re-use" old costumes, but he found it "difficult, because everything looked either very dated or too current, and you could sort of recognize what ballet it came from." For the female costumes, he ended up choosing the leotards from Martins' Friandises, but without the skirts, while the costumes for men are from unused unitards with some modifications.

The lighting was designed by Mark Stanley.

== Performances ==
In Creases premiered on July 14, 2012, at the Saratoga Performing Arts Center, where the New York City Ballet performs annually, during which Peck performed in other ballets, including principal roles in Robbins' In the Night and Balanchine's Brahms–Schoenberg Quartet. Peck called the experience of watching it premiere "nerve wracking." Following its premiere, In Creases was performed by the smaller touring troupe New York City Ballet Moves, including at the Vail Dance Festival. On the tour, Peck was in three other ballets, so he would watch In Creases then go backstage to get ready for his performance. The ballet had its New York City premiere on May 29, 2013, by then two other ballets by Peck, Year of the Rabbit and Paz de la Jolla, had premiered there, and Peck was promoted to soloist.

The Joffrey Ballet in Chicago performed In Creases for the first time in 2015. It was the first ballet created by Peck for the New York City Ballet that was revived by another company. The Paris Opera Ballet had their premiere of In Creases in 2016. It was staged by Christian Tworzyanski, an original cast member who had recently joined Les Ballets de Monte Carlo in Monaco. Tworzyanski had never staged a ballet before, and learned the other roles via a video and speaking to Peck. Tworzyanski has since staged In Creases for Ballet Austin, The Washington Ballet and BalletMet. Boston Ballet and Ballet Arizona have also performed In Creases.

== Original cast ==
Original cast:

- Emilie Gerrity
- Brittany Pollack
- Gretchen Smith
- Lydia Wellington
- Robert Fairchild
- Taylor Stanley
- Sean Suozzi
- Christian Tworzyanski

== Critical reception ==
On the world premiere, New York Times's Alastair Macaulay wrote that the impression of In Creases "is of a dreamscape that heightens the progress and colors of its score," though it "passes so smoothly that it’s difficult to remember after a first viewing just how these and other scenes all fit together." Reviewing the New York City premiere, Marina Harss of DanceTabs called it a "short, lively piece" but "[i]t’s not terribly surprising that In Creases is not as fully developed or integrated as Year of the Rabbit and Paz de la Jolla." Apollinaire Scherr of the Financial Times commented that the ballet "invested the moment with the force of the future, and its own modest self with a vision of the art form: enough for any audience, new and young included."
