= Indiana Woodward =

Ballet dancer (b. 1993/94)

- Born: 1993 or 1994 (age 30–31); Paris, France
- Education: School of American Ballet; Fordham University
- Occupation: ballet dancer
- Years active: 2012–present
- Career
- Current group: New York City Ballet
- Website: indianawoodward.com

Indiana Woodward (born 1993 or 1994) is a French ballet dancer. She joined the New York City Ballet in 2012, and was promoted to principal dancer in 2021.

== Early life and training ==
Woodward was born in Paris, to a French filmmaker father and a South African dancer mother, who had worked with choreographer Roland Petit. She lived in Paris until she was three, when her family relocated to Philadelphia. When she was seven, her parents divorced. Woodward, her mother and younger brother moved to Los Angeles, while her father returned to Paris.

Woodward's early ballet training was in the Russian ballet style. Beginning at age 10, she trained with Yuri Grigoriev, She also attended intensives at Bolshoi Ballet Academy and Kirov Academy of Ballet. When she was fifteen, she was invited to attend a two-month program in scholarship, and perform at a showcase at Bolshoi Ballet Academy. On her way to Moscow, she auditioned for the summer program of the School of American Ballet, the New York City Ballet's affiliated school, despite knowing little about the school, the company or the Balanchine technique, but she was accepted on scholarship anyway. After the summer, she joined the school full-time. She originated a role in a ballet by Lauren Lovette during the New York Choreographic Institute, and graduated after two years of training.

== Career ==
In August 2012, Woodward became an apprentice with the New York City Ballet. She joined company's corps de ballet in December that year. She was chosen for soloist roles early on in her career, including in Wheeldon's Soirée Musicale. In 2016, she danced as the Sylph in La Sylphide in order to replace an injured dancer. She also created featured roles in Lovette's For Clara and Walker's Ten in Seven (both 2016).

In February 2017, she was promoted to soloist. Among the ballets she had dance featured roles whilst a soloist include Balanchine's Symphony in C, "Emerald" from Jewels, as Sugar Plum Fairy and Dewdrop in The Nutcracker, Calliope in Apollo, and Butterfly from A Midsummer Night's Dream, Robbins' West Side Story Suite, "Winter" from The Four Seasons, as Juliet in Martins' Romeo + Juliet, as Aurora in The Sleeping Beauty, Wheeldon's Mercurial Manoeuvres, Peck's Year of the Rabbit, The Times Are Racing and Principia, and Ratmansky's Pictures at an Exhibition. She also originated roles in Peck's Pulcinella Variations (2017), Tanowitz's Bartók Ballet and Liang's Lineage (both 2019).

In October 2021, Woodward was named principal dancer. Her promotion came soon after the company return to performing after the COVID-19 pandemic, as well as multiple principal dancers' retirements. Ballets she had since performed include Balanchine's La Valse, Sonatine, Duo Concertant, Haieff Divertimento and the Divertissement in A Midsummer Night's Dream, Robbins'The Four Seasons, Piano Pieces, Fancy Free and Rondo, as well as Ratmansky's Concerto DSCH. She also originated a role in Roberts' Emanon — in Two Movements and Reisen's Play Time (both 2022).

== Personal life ==
As of 2022, Woodward lives in Upper West Side, Manhattan. She is studying for a Bachelor of Arts degree at Fordham University, with plans to major in anthropology.
