= Patricia Delgado =

American ballet dancer (born 1980s)

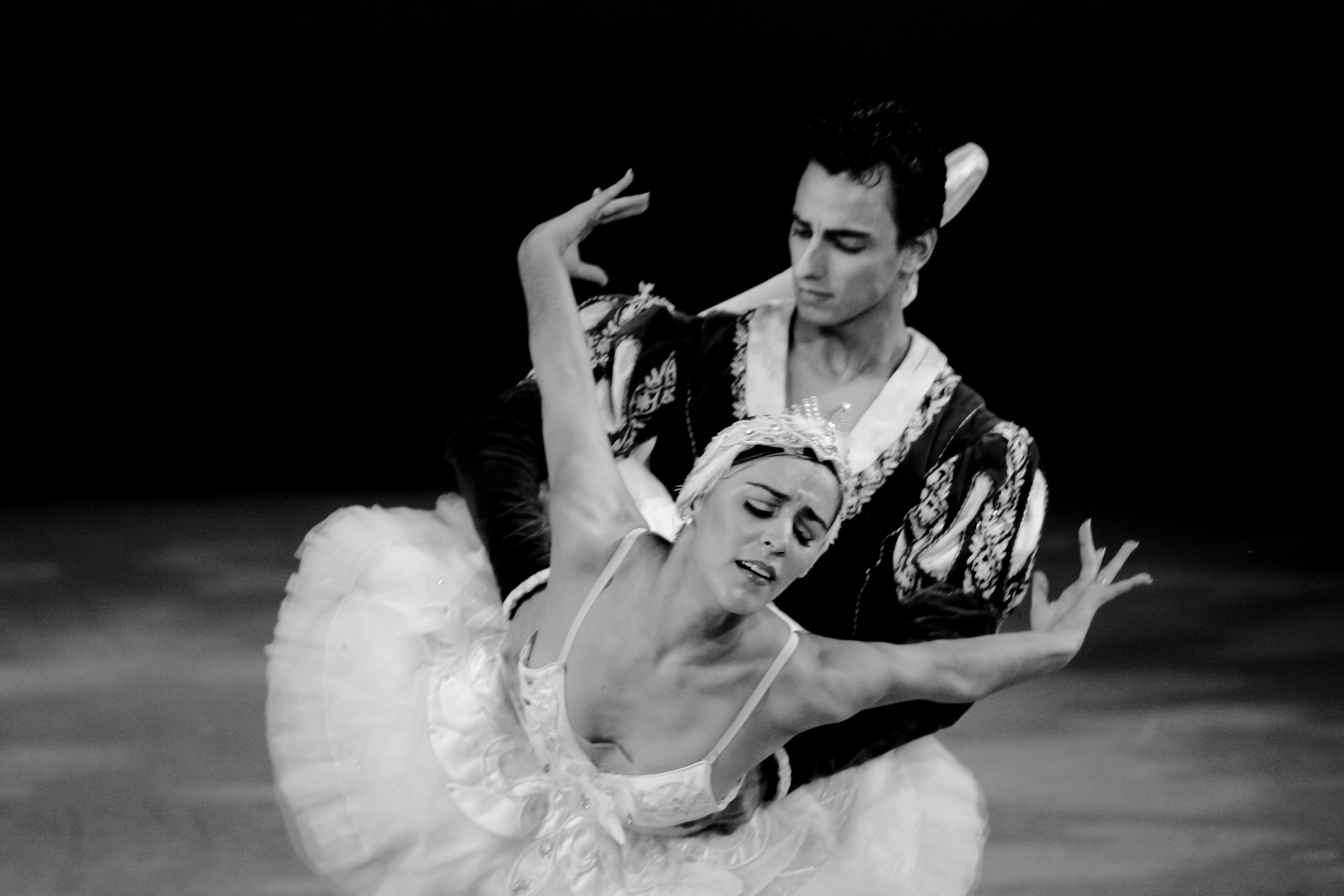
- Delgado and Daniel Sarabia in Swan Lake
- Born: 1981 or 1982 (age 43–44); Miami, Florida, U.S.
- Occupations: Ballet dancer; Répétiteur; Pedagogue
- Years active: 2000–present
- Organizations: Miami City Ballet; The Juilliard School
- Spouse: Justin Peck
- Children: 1

Patricia Delgado (born 1981 or 1982) is an American ballet dancer, répétiteur and teacher. She joined the Miami City Ballet in 2000, was promoted to principal dancer in 2007 and left in 2017. Since then, she performs as a freelance dancer, stages works by her husband Justin Peck, and teaches ballet at The Juilliard School part-time. She served as an associate producer in the 2020 Broadway revival of West Side Story and as associate choreographer of the 2021 film adaptation of the musical. She won the 2025 Tony Award for Best Choreography alongside her husband Peck for choreographing the musical Buena Vista Social Club.

== Early life and training ==
Delgado was born in Miami. Her mother is a psychologist whose family are immigrants from Cuba. Her father is a high school math teacher and basketball coach. Her younger sister, Jeanette, would also become a principal dancer with the Miami City Ballet. Delgado was raised in the suburb of West Kendall.

Delgado started ballet at age five and entered the Miami City Ballet School when she was eleven. Linda Villella, the director of the school, encouraged her to attend summer intensives in New York. In 1998, when Delgado was fifteen, she was invited by Miami City Ballet director Edward Villella to tour with the company in Upstate New York. She also attended the Coral Reef Senior High School, where she studied the International Baccalaureate program.

== Career ==
During the 2000-01 school year, Delgado's last year in high school, she became an apprentice with the Miami City Ballet. She joined the corps de ballet after that, and was promoted to soloist in 2005 and principal dancer two years later. Her repertoire includes works by George Balanchine, Jerome Robbins, Twyla Tharp, and Paul Taylor, and she also created roles for Justin Peck. She left the company in 2017, citing injuries and her plan to move to New York to join Peck, her then-boyfriend, as the reasons of her departure.

Her first job since leaving Miami City Ballet was to stage Peck's In Creases for the Boston Ballet, and she subsequently also staged other ballets by Peck at various ballet companies. As a freelance dancer, she worked with Peck and Pam Tanowitz. She also performed in Christopher Wheeldon's 2017 production of Brigadoon at the New York City Center, and with Peck in the music video for the indie rock band The National's "Dark Side of the Gym", which he also directed and choreographed. The two have since performed "Dark Side of the Gym" with The National on The Tonight Show Starring Jimmy Fallon, and an expanded version onstage, which also features the song "Guilty Party".

In 2019, she was invited by The Juilliard School Dance Division's director Alicia Graf Mack to teach ballet part-time, and she also participates in the mentor program. She was later brought in as an associate producer for the 2020 Broadway revival of West Side Story, mainly to provide a Latino perspective on Anne Teresa De Keersmaeker's choreography. She also served as associate choreographer to Peck for the 2021 Steven Spielberg film adaptation of the musical.

Delgado and Peck won the 2025 Tony Award for Best Choreography and the Chita Rivera Award for Outstanding Choreography in a Broadway Show for Buena Vista Social Club.

== Personal life ==
Delgado is married to choreographer Justin Peck. They welcomed their daughter in March 2021.
