= Sterling Hyltin =

American ballet dancer

- Born: July 8, 1985 (age 40); Amarillo, Texas, U.S.
- Education: School of American Ballet
- Occupation: Ballet dancer
- Years active: 2002-2022
- Spouse: Ryan Bailes (m. 2019)
- Career
- Current group: New York City Ballet
- Dances: Ballet

Sterling Hyltin is an American ballet dancer. She was a principal dancer at the New York City Ballet.

== Early life and training ==
Hyltin was born in Amarillo, Texas. She wanted to be a figure skater, and would train before school started. However, Hyltin's mother also enrolled her to ballet classes. When she was 12, she auditioned for School of American Ballet, but was rejected. She was ultimately accepted by SAB's summer program in 2000, and stayed in New York as a full-time student.

== Career ==
Hyltin became an apprentice with New York City Ballet in 2002, and became a member of the corps de ballet the following year. She was named soloist in 2006 and principal dancer the following year. Her repertoire included classical roles such as Aurora in The Sleeping Beauty and the Sylph in La Sylphide, George Balanchine's works such as "Rubies" from Jewels, Western Symphony and Theme and Variations, and Jerome Robbins works including Afternoon of a Faun and The Four Seasons. She also originated a number of roles including Jean-Pierre Frohlich's Varied Trio (in four) and Justin Peck's Pulcinella Variations.

Hyltin was featured in documentary Ballet 422, which follows the creation of Peck’s Paz de la Jolla.

Hyltin received the Janice Levin Dancer Award in 2005-06, which was given to promising corps dancers of NYCB.

Hyltin was a teaching fellow at School of American Ballet between 2014 and 2016. She became a permanent faculty in 2016.

She defended Peter Martins, then Ballet Master in Chief of the New York City Ballet, when he was accused of physical and sexual abuse.

Hyltin retired in December 2022 after performing the Sugarplum Fairy in the George Balanchine version of The Nutcracker.

== Selected repertoire ==
- Afternoon of a Faun
- Apollo
- Ballo della Regina
- The Concert
- Concerto DSCH
- Coppélia (Swanilda)
- Dances at a Gathering
- The Four Seasons (Spring, Winter)
- Harlequinade (Lead Alouette)
- "Rubies" from Jewels
- A Midsummer Night's Dream (Divertissement, Hermia, Butterfly)
- The Nutcracker
- Serenade
- The Sleeping Beauty (Aurora, Eloquence, White Cat, Princess Florine)
- La Source
- Swan Lake (Balanchine version) (Odette)
- Swan Lake (Martins version) (Odette/Odile, Pas de Quatre, Pas de Trois)
- La Sylphide (The Sylph [NYCB Premiere])
- Symphony in C (Second and Third Movements)
- La Valse
- Western Symphony

=== Created roles ===
- Robert Binet: The Blue of Distance
- Kim Brandstrup: Jeux
- Jean-Pierre Frohlich: Varied Trio (in four)
- Douglas Lee: Lifecasting
- Pontus Lidberg: The Shimmering Asphalt
- Annabelle Lopez Ochoa: Unframed
- Wayne McGregor: Outlier
- Peter Martins: Bal de Couture, Romeo + Juliet (Juliet), The Red Violin
- Benjamin Millepied: Neverwhere, Plainspoken
- Alexey Miroshnichenko: The Lady with The Little Dog
- Justin Peck: Everywhere We Go, The Most Incredible Thing (The Princess), Paz de la Jolla, Pulcinella Variations
- Alexei Ratmansky: Odessa
- Christopher Wheeldon: Rococo Variations

== Personal life ==
In 2019, Hyltin married Ryan Bailes, a research analyst at an investment management firm.
