= Michael P. Atkinson =

American musician and composer (born 1978)

Michael P. Atkinson (born 1978) is an American musician, active as an arranger/orchestrator, composer, conductor and hornist.

== Early Life and Education ==
Born in 1978, Michael P. Atkinson was raised in Pittsburgh, Pennsylvania, attending Pittsburgh Public Schools, where he began music and French horn studies at age 8 at John Morrow Elementary School, continuing on to the performing arts magnet schools Rogers CAPA Middle School and CAPA High School. He also played in the Pittsburgh Youth Symphony Orchestra, and during the summers of 1994 and 1995, he participated in the Chautauqua Youth Symphony in Chautauqua, New York.

In 1996, Atkinson was accepted to study music at The Juilliard School.

== Career ==
=== Hornist ===
Atkinson first performed with The Knights in 2007, and became a member shortly after. He went on to be a featured soloist on concerts with The Knights performing works by Mozart, Britten, and Lisa Bielawa.

=== Conductor ===
Atkinson is currently Associate Conductor of The Knights, where he has led collaborative performances with BalletCollective, at Alice Tully Hall with Natalie Merchant and her band, at the Naumburg Bandshell in Central Park, NYC, and at Seiji Ozawa Hall at Tanglewood Music Center in Lenox, MA. Atkinson also conducted a side-by-side performance with musicians from The Knights and Chamber Music Center of New York. In 2025, Atkinson conducted The Knights at Carnegie Zankel Hall in the NYC Premiere of Reena Esmail's The History of Red.

He has conducted New York City Ballet in the premiere performances of Year of the Rabbit (2012) and Everywhere We Go (2014), both ballets by Justin Peck with music by Sufjan Stevens, which Atkinson arranged/orchestrated. Atkinson also conducted the premiere of Sufjan Stevens' BQE at the Brooklyn Academy of Music.

Atkinson has conducted recordings of The Heart, Sol Invictus and Remind Me I'm Not Dead; all composed by Mikael Karlsson.

Since 2022, at Works & Process at the Guggenheim, Atkinson has conducted Ensemble Connect in the annual performances of Peter and the Wolf directed and narrated by Issac Mizrahi and choreographed by John Heginbotham. In 2023 and 2024, Atkinson conducted Third Bird by Issac Mizrahi and Nico Muhly, choreographed by John Heginbotham.

=== Arranger/orchestrator ===
Atkinson is a prolific arranger/orchestrator. Notable projects include:

In 2006, Atkinson joined Sufjan Stevens and his touring band. In addition to performing on French horn, Atkinson wrote arrangements for the band. Following the tour, Atkinson continued to work with Stevens as copyist/assistant for BQE, arranging music from Enjoy Your Rabbit for string quartet which would eventually become the album Run Rabbit Run and as copyist/assistant for Roundup.

In 2012, Atkinson was commissioned to orchestrate a set of pieces from Enjoy Your Rabbit for Justin Peck's ballet Year of the Rabbit, for New York City Ballet.

In 2014, Atkinson orchestrated Stevens' score to Justin Peck's Everywhere We Go, also for New York City Ballet.

In 2016, Atkinson was commissioned by San Francisco Ballet to re-orchestrate the music from BQE to accompany the new Justin Peck ballet In the Countenance of Kings.

In 2018, Atkinson orchestrated the music for The Head and The Load by William Kentridge.

In 2021, Atkinson contributed two arrangements to the album The Knights Before Christmas featuring The Knights.

In 2022, 2024 and 2025, Atkinson contributed arrangements to the annual Feestconcert by the Netherlands Philharmonic Orchestra.

In 2023, Atkinson contributed orchestrations to the opera Melancholia by composer Mikael Karlsson and librettist Royce Vavrek.

In 2024, Atkinson contributed orchestrations to the opera Fanny and Alexander by composer Mikael Karlsson and librettist Royce Vavrek.

In 2024, Atkinson's arrangement of music from Keith Jarrett's album Book of Ways was premiered by The Knights at Carnegie Hall, featuring soloist Aaron Diehl.

In 2025, Atkinson contributed orchestrations to Grand Guignol for orchestra and soloist by composers Anna von Hausswolff and Mikael Karlsson.

In 2025, Atkinson orchestrated HeartSpoken Suite by Craig Taborn for the Brussels Philharmonic for the 6th Jazz Meets Symphonic Series at Flagey.

In 2026, Atkinson orchestrated A Trail of Sonic Sparks Across and Analog Landscape by Jakob Bro for the Brussels Philharmonic, Vlaams Radiokoor, Midori Takada and Mark Turner for the 7th Jazz Meets Symphonic Series at Flagey.

=== Composer ===
Selected Notable Works:

2022 - Coppélia – co-composed with Mikael Karlsson incorporating themes by Léo Delibes for Scottish Ballet. Coppélia won two UK National Dance Awards in 2023.

2025 - Mary, Queen of Scots – co-composed with Mikael Karlsson for Scottish Ballet. Mary, Queen of Scots has been nominated for two UK National Dance Awards in 2026.

2027 - New work (in progress) for the Rhapsody Project, commissioned by The Knights.
