= Teresa Reichlen =

American ballet dancer

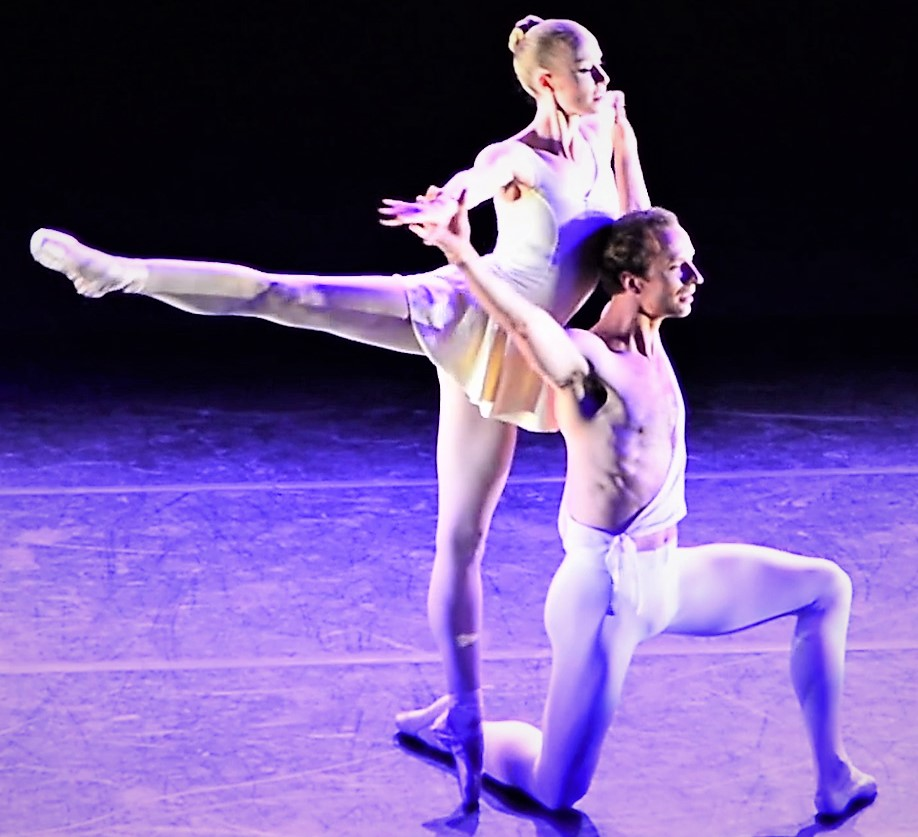
- Reichlen with Ask la Cour in Apollo, 2017
- Born: 1984 or 1985 (age 41–42); Clifton, Virginia, U.S.
- Education: School of American Ballet
- Occupation: ballet dancer
- Years active: 2011-present
- Height: 5 ft 9 in (175 cm)
- Spouse: Scott Ogden
- Children: 1
- Dancing career
- Current group: New York City Ballet

Teresa Reichlen (born 1984 or 1985) is an American ballet dancer. She joined the New York City Ballet in 2001, was promoted to principal dancer in 2009, and retired in 2022.

== Early life ==
Reichlen was born in Clifton, Virginia. She has three brothers. When she was three, her parents sent her to ballet classes. At age 10, she started training at Russell School of Ballet, in Northern Virginia. She is the first person from that academy accepted by the School of American Ballet, but she deferred for a year and then entered SAB in 1999, at age 15. During her deferral year, she attended a summer intensive session at the School of American Ballet and, afterward, stayed in New York City as a full-time student.

== Career ==
In 2000, at age sixteen, Reichlen got an apprenticeship at the New York City Ballet. She thought she would join Pacific Northwest Ballet, which is known for hiring taller dancers, but ended up joining the corps de ballet the following year. At age 19, Reichlen danced the solo role in "Rubies" from Jewels. She was promoted to soloist in 2005. In 2009, at age 25, she became a principal dancer. She has danced lead roles in works by George Balanchine, Jerome Robbins, Justin Peck and Christopher Wheeldon.

In the 2004-05 season, Reichlen was the Janice Levin Dancer Honorees, which is given to promising corps members at the NYCB.

Reichlen had also performed with Wheeldon's company, Morphoses, and Columbia Ballet Collaborative. In 2010, Reichlen performed in Cuba, alongside several other NYCB dancers.

In 2018, after NYCB was sued by Alexandra Waterbury, a former student at SAB, Reichlen spoke on behalf of the dancers at NYCB's fall fashion gala. The speech was written by her and fellow principal dancer Adrian Danchig-Waring. Though she did not name the lawsuit or anyone involved, she noted, "we will not put art before common decency or allow talent to sway our moral compass."

Reichlen retired from ballet in February 2022, following a performance of Balanchine's one-act Swan Lake. She works as the gallery manager of Shrine, which was founded by her husband.

== Selected repertoire ==
Reichlen's repertoire with the New York City Ballet includes:

- After The Rain
- Agon
- Apollo (Polyhymnia)
- Concerto Barocco
- Coppélia (Dawn)
- DGV: Danse à Grande Vitesse (NYCB Premiere)
- The Firebird
- Harlequinade (La Bonne Fée)
- "Emeralds" and "Rubies" from Jewels
- A Midsummer Night's Dream (Titania, Hippolyta)
- The Nutcracker (Sugarplum Fairy, Dewdrop, Coffee, Flowers)
- Orpheus (Eurydice)
- Polyphonia
- Raymonda Variations
- Serenade
- The Sleeping Beauty (Lilac Fairy, Carabosse, Diamond)
- Stars and Stripes
- Swan Lake (Balanchine version) (Odette)
- Swan Lake (Martins version) (Odette/Odile, Pas de Quatre, Russian, Princess)
- Symphony in C (Second Movement)
- Walpurgisnacht Ballet
- Western Symphony (Rondo)
- The Four Seasons (Summer)

=== Created roles ===
- Bal de Couture
- Clearing Dawn
- Common Ground
- Everywhere We Go
- Luce Nascosta
- Plainspoken
- Year of the Rabbit

== Personal life ==
Reichlen studied biology in Barnard College.

She is married to Scott Ogden. She has a son.
