= Taylor Stanley =

American ballet dancer

- Born: May 30, 1991 (age 35); Philadelphia, Pennsylvania
- Education: School of American Ballet
- Occupation: Ballet dancer
- Years active: 2009–present
- Career
- Current group: New York City Ballet

Taylor G. Stanley (born May 30, 1991) is an American ballet dancer who is currently a principal dancer with the New York City Ballet.

== Early life ==
Stanley was born in Philadelphia to a mixed-race family, and was raised in West Chester, Pennsylvania. At age three, they started learning ballet, tap, jazz and hip hop at The Rock School for Dance Education. Initially they thought they would pursue a career in commercial dance, but their parents and teachers encouraged them to focus on ballet. At age 15, Stanley attended a summer course at the Miami City Ballet School. Two years later, Stanley attended a summer intensive at the School of American Ballet in New York City, then was asked there and to train full time for a year. At the workshop performance of SAB, they performed George Balanchine's Stars and Stripes. They also received the Mae L. Wien Awards for Outstanding Promise that year.

== Career ==
Stanley became an apprentice at the New York City Ballet in 2009, and joined the corps de ballet the following year. While they were still in the corps, they danced Romeo in Romeo and Juliet. Stanley received the Janice Levin Dancer Award in 2011–12, which is given to promising corps dancers of NYCB. They were promoted to soloist in 2013 and principal dancer in 2016. They had dance lead roles in George Balanchine's and Jerome Robbins' works. For their debut in the title role of Apollo, Stanley was coached by Craig Hall, the first African-American dancer in the company to dance that role. They had also originated roles under choreographers such as Justin Peck, Lauren Lovette and Kyle Abraham. In 2019, Stanley won a Bessie Awards for Abraham's The Runaway. Stanley will perform for the final time as a NYCB principal on February 28, 2027.

Outside of New York City Ballet, Stanley danced with their colleague Troy Schumacher's side project, BalletCollective. They also took classes at Nederlands Dans Theater and studied Gaga at Batsheva Dance Company in Tel Aviv. Stanley has also worked with an array of choreographers including Jodi Melnick, Andrea Miller, Annabelle Lopez-Ochoa, Liz Gerring, Pam Tanowitz, Kim Brandstrup, Christopher Williams, Rashaun Mitchell + Silas Reiner, Shamel Pitts, and Omar Roman de Jesus.

== Personal life ==
Stanley is openly gay and uses they/them pronouns.

As of 2015, Stanley is pursuing a Bachelor of Arts degree through St. Mary's College of California's LEAP program.

== Selected repertoire ==
Stanley's repertoire with the New York City ballet includes:

- Apollo
- Bournonville Divertissements (Ballabile from Napoli)
- Carousel (A Dance)
- The Four Seasons
- "Emeralds" from Jewels
- A Midsummer Night's Dream (Puck, Bottom)
- The Nutcracker (Cavalier, Hot Chocolate)
- N.Y. Export: Opus Jazz
- Romeo + Juliet (Romeo)
- Polyphonia
- The Sleeping Beauty (Puss in Boots)
- Square Dance
- Swan Lake (Benno, Russian, Spanish)
- Symphony in C (Third Movement)
- The Times Are Racing
- Year of the Rabbit

=== Created roles ===
- Belles-Lettres
- Capricious Maneuvers
- Everywhere We Go
- In Creases
- Mes Oiseaux
- The Most Incredible Thing (The *Creator)
- New Blood
- Not Our Fate
- Rodeo: Four Dance Episodes
- Odessa
- Polaris
- Principia
- The Runaway
- Scherzo Fantastique
- The Shaded Line
- The Shimmering Asphalt
- SOMETHING TO DANCE ABOUT Jerome Robbins, Broadway to Ballet
- ten in seven

== Awards and honors ==
- 2009: Mae L. Wien Award
- 2011–12: Janice Levin Award
- 2019: Bessie Award for Outstanding Performer
