= Pulcinella Variations =

- Choreographer: Justin Peck
- Premiere: September 28, 2017; David H. Koch Theater
- Original ballet company: New York City Ballet
- Design: Tsumori Chisato

Pulcinella Variations is a one-act ballet by Justin Peck, set to Igor Stravinsky's Pulcinella Suite, with costumes designed by Tsumori Chisato. The ballet premiered on September 28, 2017, danced by the New York City Ballet, at the David H. Koch Theater.

The choreography of Pulcinella Variations is more classical than other Peck's works, and the costumes were inspired by commedia dell’arte, which was also Stravinsky's inspiration when he wrote the music.

== Original cast ==
Original cast:

- Sterling Hyltin
- Sara Mearns
- Tiler Peck
- Brittany Pollack
- Indiana Woodward
- Jared Angle
- Andrew Scordato
- Gonzalo Garcia
- Anthony Huxley

== Videography ==
In 2020, in response to the performance cancellation due to the coronavirus pandemic, the New York City Ballet released a recording of Pulcinella Variations, filmed in 2018 with most of the original cast returning, except Mearns, Pollack and Angle, whose roles were danced by Miriam Miller, Emilie Gerrity and Russell Janzen.
