= Sonate di Scarlatti =

Sonate di Scarlatti, originally titled Tivoli, Giardino di Scarlatti, is a ballet made by New York City Ballet ballet master in chief Peter Martins to Domenico Scarlatti's Sonatas Nos. 164, 424. 188, 335, 104, 483, 349, 3, 23, 209, 465 (1728–1757). The premiere took place on 13 July 1979 at the Saratoga Performing Arts Center, Saratoga Springs, NY. It was performed at New York State Theater at Lincoln Center for the first time the following November.

== Original cast ==
- Heather Watts
- Bart Cook
- Elyse Borne
- Judith Fugate
- Lisa Hess
- Lourdes Lopez
- Victor Castelli
- Peter Frame
- Douglas Hay
- Kipling Houston
