= The Times Are Racing =

Ballet by Justin Peck

- Choreographer: Justin Peck
- Music: Dan Deacon
- Premiere: January 26, 2017; David H. Koch Theater
- Original ballet company: New York City Ballet
- Genre: contemporary ballet

The Times Are Racing is a one-act ballet by Justin Peck, to "USA I-IV" from Dan Deacon's album America, with costumes designed by Humberto Leon from the fashion label Opening Ceremony and lighting design by Brandon Stirling Baker. It premiered on January 26, 2017 at the David H. Koch Theater, danced by the New York City Ballet.

== Production ==
External videos
- New York City Ballet Presents Justin Peck's THE TIMES ARE RACING with music by Dan Deacon, YouTube video
- Gretchen Smith on THE TIMES ARE RACING: Anatomy of a Dance, YouTube video

The Times Are Racing is made by Justin Peck, the resident choreographer of the New York City Ballet. It was created during the 2016 presidential election, Peck said the ballet became "less optimistic piece than it could have been" after Donald Trump won the election. The music is "USA I-IV" from Dan Deacon's album America, an electronic score, which Peck first listened few years prior. Though it was an unusual choice for ballet, and might be unpopular among some audiences, he went with it anyway as by then he was known for a "hypermodern direction".

Peck opted the dancers to wear sneakers in the ballet, which had been used in a few ballets in NYCB's repertory and another ballet by Peck. The use of sneakers allowed him to incorporate elements of tap dance. He described the ballet as "rhythm tap and hoofing meets Fred Astaire soft-shoe, and Gene Kelly classical tap-film movements meets ballet". A tap number danced by Robert Fairchild and Peck himself was inspired by the video game Dance Dance Revolution, which the two played when they were roommates at the School of American Ballet, and Peck planned the sequence to look like the two dancers are "following along" the game's level track. Peck, who was still dancing at the time but rarely in his own work, said the tap portion was one of the reasons why he cast himself in the ballet.

Ashly Isaacs, a female soloist, was chosen to be an alternate of Fairchild's role, due to her tapping ability, and the role is believed to be the first gender-neutral principal role in NYCB's repertory.

== Revivals ==
In later revivals, Taylor Stanley, a male principal dancer, was cast to dance the role originated by Tiler Peck (no relations to Justin Peck), and partnered Daniel Applebaum. Peck said the choice was made to allow his gay colleagues to perform "without any pretense" and the casting choice would continue the ballet's "exploration of gender-neutrality", though small changes were made to accommodate the dancers.

The Joffrey Ballet in Chicago debuted The Times Are Racing in 2020. Later that year, in response to the performances cancelled due to the coronavirus pandemic, NYCB streamed the tap number with Fairchild and Peck online, as part of its digital spring season.

The Pacific Northwest Ballet in Seattle, WA has staged “The Times are Racing” twice. The premiere for Pacific Northwest Ballet was in 2022 with another revival in 2024. The Pacific Northwest Ballet’s 2024 program began with Liang’s “The Veil Between Worlds,” was followed by Lang’s “Black Wave,” with Justin Peck’s “The Times Are Racing” serving as a strong finish to the program. For “The Times are Racing” the dancers wore streetwear such as crop tops, t-shirts, hoodies, jeans, and sneakers. The costumes, designed by Humberto Leon, featured bold graphics of words such as “protest,” “defy,” and “shout.”

== Original cast ==
The Times Are Racing is performed by 20 dancers. The lead roles were originated by:

- Tiler Peck
- Amar Ramasar
- Robert Fairchild
- Justin Peck
- Brittany Pollack
- Gretchen Smith
- Savannah Lowery
- Sean Suozzi

== Critical reception ==
The Financial Times gave The Times Are Racing five stars, called it Peck's "darkest, saddest, but also loosest, freest and most grounded dance to date". The New Yorker also gave it five stars, and wrote the most impressive part "was not the cool-cat factor. It was the opposite. The ballet seemed to show a softness that was new to Peck". In a mixed review, the New York Times criticized the music and duets with Tiler Peck and Amar Ramasar but complimented other parts of the ballet.
