= Apollo Musagetes =

Apollo Musagetes may refer to:

- Apollo (ballet)
- an epithet of Apollo
