= Chita Rivera Awards for Dance and Choreography =

Chita Rivera

The Chita Rivera Awards
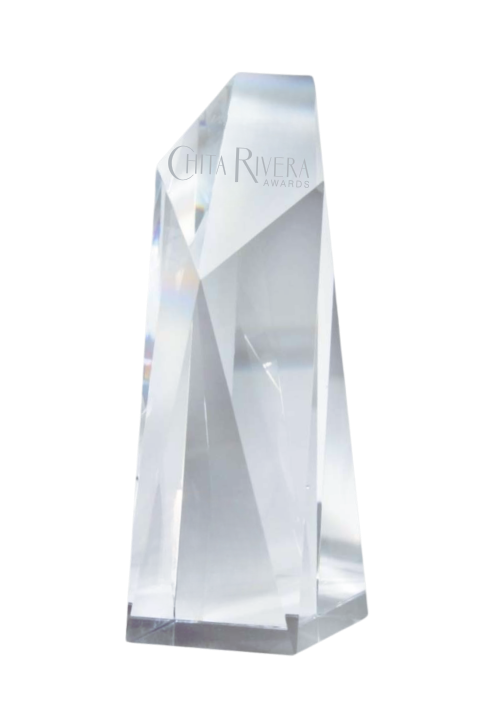
- The Chita Rivera Award in 2025
- Awarded for: Outstanding Dance and Choreography on Broadway, Off-Broadway, and Film
- Sponsored by: New York City Dance Alliance
- Country: United States
- First award: 1982
- Website: www.chitariveraawards.com
- Chita Rivera Awards Logo

The Chita Rivera Awards for Dance and Choreography, informally known as The Chitas, honor excellence in dance and choreography in both stage and screen productions. Presented annually at the Skirball Center for the Performing Arts in New York City, the awards celebrate outstanding achievements in Broadway and Off-Broadway theatre as well as in film.

Established in 1982 as The Astaire Awards, the honors were originally created to recognize the legacy of Fred Astaire and his sister Adele, who were celebrated for their influential work on the Broadway stage. In 2017, the awards were renamed in honor of two-time Tony Award-winning dance icon Chita Rivera.

The Chita Rivera Awards are presented by the New York City Dance Alliance, and the event is publicized by long-standing Broadway press agency Keith Sherman & Associates.

== History ==
Alongside its competitive categories, the Chita Rivera Awards recognize broader contributions to theatre and film through special honors, including the Lifetime Achievement Award and the award for Outstanding Contribution to Musical Theatre and Film.

Proceeds from the Chita Rivera Awards benefit the NYC Dance Alliance Foundation’s College Scholarship Program, which provides financial support to talented young dancers pursuing higher education. Since its inception, the Foundation has awarded over $5 million in scholarships to more than 500 students attending 50 of the nation's leading college dance programs.

Originally established in 1982 as the Astaire Awards, the honors were created in collaboration with Fred Astaire to celebrate both his legacy and that of his sister, Adele Astaire. The siblings starred together in ten Broadway musicals between 1917 and 1931.

From 2001 to 2005, the Theatre Development Fund presented the awards under the name TDF Astaire Awards. In 2007, the awards were rebranded as the Fred & Adele Astaire Awards, a title they retained until 2017, when they were officially renamed the Chita Rivera Awards for Dance and Choreography.

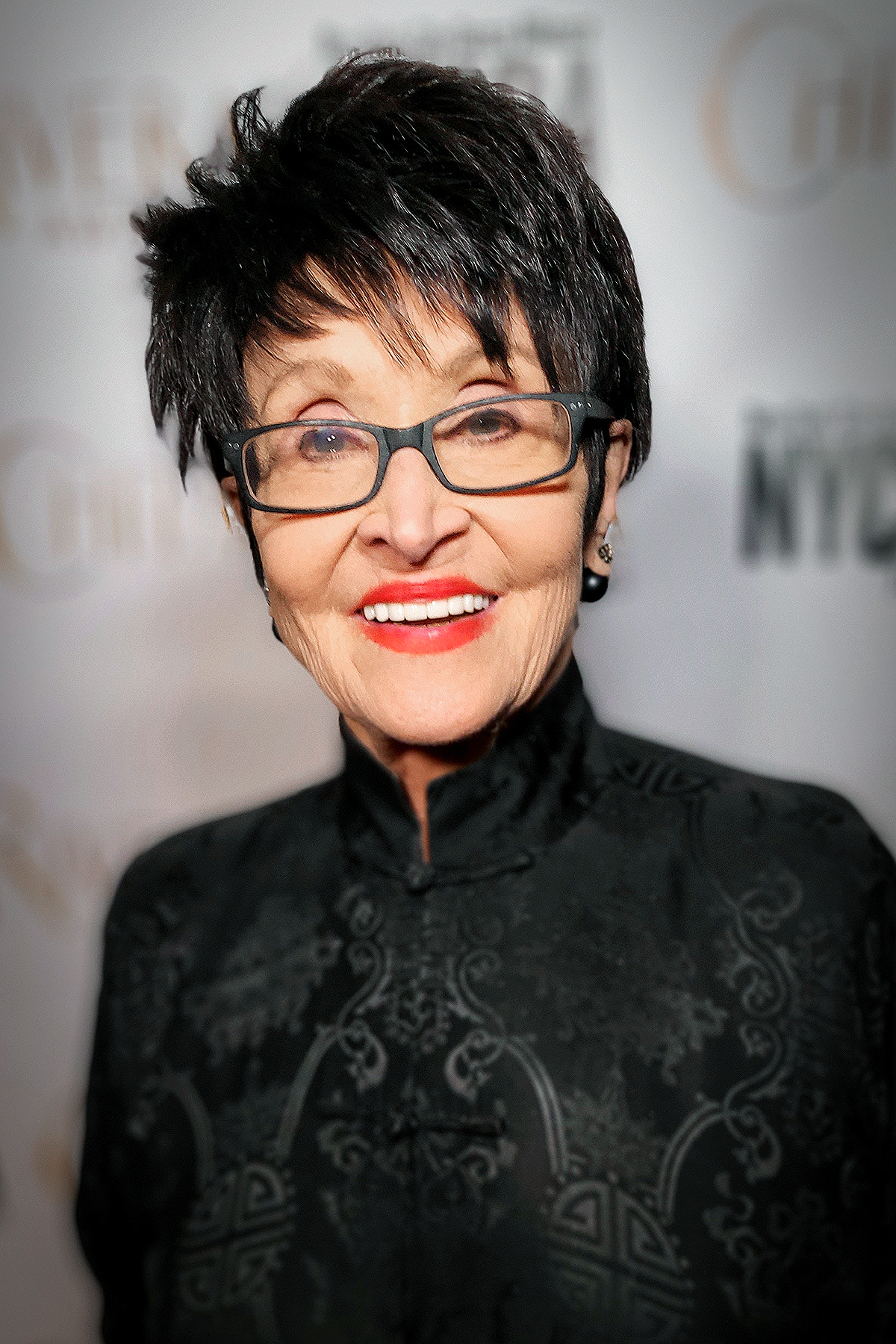
Chita Rivera on the red carpet of the 2022 Chita Rivera Awards

The awards' use of Fred Astaire’s name led to a series of legal challenges by his widow, Robyn Astaire, who sought to restrict unauthorized use of his name and likeness. In 2010, she attempted to block the ceremony, asserting that the “Fred and Adele Astaire Awards” violated trademark and publicity rights. The ensuing legal battle involved Astaire’s daughter, Phyllis Ava Astaire McKenzie, and other stakeholders in the awards. Ultimately, courts denied Robyn Astaire's motions for restraining orders, citing insufficient evidence of likely success or irreparable harm. These disputes highlighted ongoing legal complexities related to posthumous publicity rights and the control of celebrity estates.

Choreographer Susan Stroman holds the record for the most awards in the history of the Chita (formerly Astaire) Awards. She won her fifth award in 2011 for The Scottsboro Boys. Stroman earned the Best Choreography in a Broadway Show award for three consecutive years: in 2000 for Contact and The Music Man, in 2001 for The Producers, and in 2002 for Oklahoma!. She first received the honor in 1994 for the Broadway revival of Show Boat.

Recipients of the Chita Rivera Awards and their predecessor, the Astaire Awards, span several generations of Broadway, film and American dance. Honorees have included Liza Minnelli, Bernadette Peters, Joel Grey, Chita Rivera and John Kander, alongside performers and choreographers such as Ariana DeBose, Debbie Allen, Ann Reinking, Tommy Tune, Savion Glover, Rob Marshall, Susan Stroman, Bebe Neuwirth, Jane Krakowski, Andy Blankenbuehler, Adrienne Warren, Wayne Cilento, Ben Vereen, Karen Olivo, Corbin Bleu, Robyn Hurder and Desmond Richardson.

In 2016, the eligibility criteria were expanded to include Off-Broadway productions. On March 30, 2017, the awards were officially rebranded as the Chita Rivera Awards for Dance and Choreography. In 2023, the organization announced the adoption of gender-neutral performance categories, replacing traditional gendered awards with a single, inclusive category featuring twice as many nominees and two winners.

== Categories ==
- Outstanding Choreography in a Broadway Show
- Outstanding Dancers in a Broadway Show
- Outstanding Ensemble in a Broadway Show
- Outstanding Choreography in a Feature Film
- Outstanding Direction of a Dance Documentary
- Lifetime Achievement Award

The film choreography category was listed as "Outstanding Choreography in a Theatrical Release" in 2024 and as "Outstanding Choreography in a Feature Film" in 2025.

Retired categories:

- Outstanding Female Dancer in a Broadway Show
- Outstanding Male Dancer in a Broadway Show
- Outstanding Female Dancer in an Off-Broadway Show
- Outstanding Male Dancer in an Off-Broadway Show
- Outstanding Choreography in an Off-Broadway Show
- Outstanding Dancers in an Off-Broadway Show
- Outstanding Ensemble in an Off-Broadway Show

== Previous Award Winners ==
Broadway Awards
	Outstanding Choreography in a Broadway Show	Outstanding Dancers in a Broadway Show	Outstanding Ensemble in a Broadway Show
2026	Christopher Gattelli, Schmigadoon!	Max Clayton, Schmigadoon!; Robert “Silk” Mason, Cats: The Jellicle Ball; Isabelle McCalla, Schmigadoon!	Schmigadoon!
2025	Patricia Delgado & Justin Peck, Buena Vista Social Club	Kevin Csolak, Gypsy; Robyn Hurder, Smash	Buena Vista Social Club
2024	Camille A Brown, Hell’s Kitchen; Jesse Robb & Shana Carroll, Water For Elephants	Antoine Boissereau, Water For Elephants; Tilly Evans-Kreuger, The Outsiders	Illinoise
2023	Steven Hoggett, A Beautiful Noise	Robyn Hurder, A Beautiful Noise; Jess LeProtto, A Beautiful Noise; Mattie Love, Bob Fosse’s Dancin’	A Beautiful Noise; Bob Fosse’s Dancin’
2022	Bill T. Jones, Garrett Coleman & Jason Oremus, Paradise Square	Myles Frost, MJ the Musical; Jared Grimes, Funny Girl; Tendayi Kuumba, for colored girls...	for colored girls who have considered suicide/ when the rainbow is enuf
2021	No ceremony held due to the COVID-19 Pandemic in New York City		
2020	No ceremony held due to the COVID-19 Pandemic in New York City		
2019	David Neumann, Hadestown	Ashley Blair Fitzgerald, The Cher Show; Gabrielle Hamilton, Oklahoma!; Ephraim Sykes, Ain’t Too Proud	King Kong
2018	Sergio Trujillo, Summer: The Donna Summer Musical	Ariana DeBose, Summer: The Donna Summer Musical; Tony Yazbeck, Prince of Broadway	Carousel; Mean Girls
2017	Andy Blankenbuehler, Bandstand	Corbin Bleu, Holiday Inn; Megan Sikora, Holiday Inn	Natasha, Pierre & the Great Comet of 1812
2016	Andy Blankenbuehler, Hamilton; Savion Glover, Shuffle Along - Sergio Trujillo, On Your Feet	Jane Krakowski, She Loves Me; Phillip Attmore, Shuffle Along	Shuffle Along

Off-Broadway Awards
	Outstanding Choreography in an Off-Broadway Show	Outstanding Dancers in an Off-Broadway Show	Outstanding Ensemble in an Off-Broadway Show
2025	Arturo Lyons & Omari Wiles, Cats: The Jellicle Ball	Not Awarded	Not Awarded
2024	Not Awarded	Not Awarded	Not Awarded
2023	Andy Blankenbuehler, Only Gold	Gaby Diaz, Only Gold; Ryan Steele, Only Gold	Not Awarded
2022	Josh Prince, Trevor	Not Awarded	The Wrong Man
2021	No ceremony held due to the COVID-19 Pandemic in New York City		
2020	No ceremony held due to the COVID-19 Pandemic in New York City		
2019	Rick Kuperman & Jeff Kuperman, Alice By Heart	Wesley Taylor, Alice By Heart; Irina Dvorovenko, The Beast in the Jungle	Smokey Joe’s Café
2018	Zach Morris & Jennine Willett, Ghost Light	Monica Bill Barnes, One Night Only; Robbie Fairchild, Mary Shelley’s Frankenstein	Not Awarded
2017	Joshua Bergasse, Sweet Charity	Lyrica Woodruff, Finian's Rainbow; Brandon Espinoza, Baghdaddy	Not Awarded
2016	Connor Gallagher, The Robber Bridegroom; Paul McGill, The Legend Of Georgia McBride	Robert Creighton, Cagney; Rumi Oyama, Sayonara	Not Awarded

Film & Other Awards
	Lifetime Achievement Award	Outstanding Choreography in a Feature Film	Outstanding Direction of a Dance Documentary
2025	Ben Vereen	Sh’ma: A Story of Survival, Suki John	A Resilient Man, Stephane Carrel
2024	Bernadette Peters	Barbie, Jennifer White	Lift, David Petersen
2023	John Kander	13: The Musical, Jamal Sims	Everybody Dance, Dan Watt
2022	Joel Grey	tick… tick… Boom!, Ryan Heffington, Ryan Spencer	First Try, Josh Prince
2021	No ceremony held due to the COVID-19 Pandemic in New York City		
2020	No ceremony held due to the COVID-19 Pandemic in New York City		
2019	Graciela Daniele	Mary Poppins Returns, Rob Marshall & John DeLuca	Moving Stories: Lives Transformed By Dance, Rob Fruchtman
2018	Carmen de Lavallade	The Greatest Showman, Shannon Holtzapffel, Ashley Wallen	Anatomy of a Male Ballet Dancer, David Barba, James Pellerito
2017	Tommy Tune	London Road, Javier de Frutos	Restless Creature, Linda Saffire, Adam Schlesinger
2016	Judith Jamison	Dave Scott, High Strung	Not Awarded
