= Year of the Rabbit (ballet) =

Ballet choreographed by Justin Peck

- Choreographer: Justin Peck
- Music: Sufjan Stevens
- Premiere: October 5, 2012; David H. Koch Theater
- Original ballet company: New York City Ballet
- Design: Justin Peck; Brandon Stirling Baker

Year of the Rabbit is a ballet choreographed by Justin Peck to music from Sufjan Stevens's album, Enjoy Your Rabbit. The ballet premiered on October 5, 2012, at the David H. Koch Theater, danced by the New York City Ballet.

== Production ==
=== Background ===
Peck joined the New York City Ballet as a dancer in 2007. He made several ballets for the New York Choreographic Institute for several years. His first ballet for the New York City Ballet In Creases, had a successful premiere in Saratoga Springs in July 2012, and Year of the Rabbit, which premiered on October 5, 2012, was his first ballet to be performed in Manhattan. Peck was 25 and a corps de ballet dancer with the New York City Ballet when Year of the Rabbit premiered.

=== Music ===
Peck said he first heard music from Sufjan Stevens's album, Enjoy Your Rabbit in 2009, when a string quartet performed an arrangement on WNYC, and found it "really innovative and danceable." He was then introduced to Stevens through a mutual friend. Stevens claimed that he was initially "flabbergasted" by the request to provide the music as he was known for folk songs, but Enjoy Your Rabbit is an electronic score which he made as "sort of a hobby," inspired by the animals of the Chinese zodiac, a concept he would later "cringe a little," and said that most of his fans "dislike" this album. Furthermore, he first found ballet "anachronistic" and "didn’t understand it." However, Peck invited Stevens to various ballet performances, and Balanchine's Agon was the one that "clicked." Once Stevens allowed his album to be used for the ballet, it had to be orchestrated by Michael P. Atkinson, who was also the conductor at the premiere, and according to Peck, a transition led to them spending two hours "to figure out just how to count it for the dancers." Stevens said he did not think his music was "danceable" prior to Year of the Rabbit.

=== Choreography ===
Year of the Rabbit is an expansion Peck made for the New York Choreographic Institute, of Tales of a Chinese Zodiac. He was supposed to work on the choreography in spring 2012, but it was pushed back to allow him to work on In Creases. He had less than six weeks to work on Year of the Rabbit, and could only work with one dancer in the first three days. He researched the Chinese zodiac, but concluded if he based the ballet on that "it would drive [him] crazy." However, he incorporated texts he read in the choreography.

The ballet is performed by eighteen dancers, including six leads. Peck said he wanted "to create a sense of equality between the corps and the principal dancers." For the original cast, he chose dancers he knew well. Craig Hall, an original cast member who later became Peck's rehearsal assistant, recalled when they were working on Year of the Rabbit, Peck "pulled something out of me that I didn’t know I had in me."

=== Designs ===
Peck also designed the costumes, supervised by Marc Happel, while Brandon Stirling Baker designed the lighting.

=== Revivals ===
Other companies that have performed the ballet include Dutch National Ballet, Pacific Northwest Ballet, Joffrey Ballet and Houston Ballet. Stagers of the ballet include original cast members Craig Hall and Janie Taylor.

== Original cast ==
Original cast:

- Ashley Bouder
- Teresa Reichlen
- Janie Taylor
- Joaquin de Luz
- Robert Fairchild
- Craig Hall

== Critical reception ==
The ballet received critical acclaim. The New York Times commented, "[i]t was a triumph not just for Mr. Peck but also for the institution that has nurtured him." DanceTabs wrote that the ballet is "about the excitement of working in a ballet company and teasing out the things that ballet is capable of, the stimulation of structure and detail, but also of stylized athleticism," but pointed out some "usual problems." Dance Magazine called it Peck's "terrific Koch Theater debut."

Peck was nominated for the Prix Benois de la Danse for choreographing Year of the Rabbit. In 2020, Dance Magazine included the ballet in its "20 Top Works of the Last 20 Years" list.
