= Janie Taylor =

American ballet dancer

- Born: 1980 or 1981 (age 45–46); Houston, Texas, U.S.
- Education: School of American Ballet
- Occupations: ballet dancer; répétiteur; costume designer
- Spouse: Sébastien Marcovici (m. 2012)
- Dancing career
- Current group: L.A. Dance Project
- Former groups: New York City Ballet
- Website: janie-taylor.com

Janie Taylor (born 1980 or 1981) is an American ballet dancer, répétiteur and costume designer. She joined New York City Ballet in 1998, was promoted to principal dancer in 2005 and left in 2014. She then started designing costumes and staging works by Justin Peck and Benjamin Millepied, before performing again as a member of the L.A. Dance Project.

== Early life and training ==
Taylor was born in Houston, and started ballet at age 2. She moved to New Orleans with her family when she was 12. In 1995, Taylor entered the School of American Ballet in New York, and dance lead roles at the school annual workshop during her last two years of training, before graduating in 1998. She received the Mae L. Wien Award the same year.

== Dance career ==
In 1998, Taylor became an apprentice with the New York City Ballet, and was taken to the corps de ballet a month later. The following year, at age 18, she danced the principal role in George Balanchine's La Valse. She was promoted to soloist in 2001 and principal dancer in 2005. She had dance lead roles by Balanchine and Jerome Robbins, and had created roles for Benjamin Millepied and Justin Peck.

In March 2014, at age 33, Taylor and Sébastien Marcovici, her husband and a fellow principal dancer, both departed New York City Ballet following a performance of La Valse and Robbins' Afternoon of a Faun. The program was not chosen by them though the two believed it was suitable for their farewell. She had stated she decided to leave because Marcovici was retiring from performing and the two agreed that it would be best for both of them.

In 2014, after Taylor left New York City Ballet, she moved to Los Angeles as Marcovici joined Millepied's company, the L.A. Dance Project, as a ballet master. Later that year, the couple moved to Paris when Marcovici became a ballet master with the Paris Opera Ballet, at the time directed by Millepied. During the two years Taylor lived in Paris, she staged works by Peck and Millepied for ballet companies in Europe and the U.S at the choreographers' request. Taylor returned to Los Angeles after Millepied left the Paris Opera Ballet, and she joined the L.A. Dance Project as a dancer. She made her choreographic debut in 2019, in a piece titled Adagio in B Minor.

== Other ventures ==
Taylor had appeared in the 2000 film Center Stage as a background dancer, and served as a motion capture dancer for Barbie of Swan Lake.

While in the New York City Ballet, she often wears leotards she made. In 2014, she designed the costumes for Peck's Everywhere We Go, which was also her first job since she announced her departure from the New York City Ballet. She later designed the costumes for Christopher Wheeldon's American Rhapsody and Joshua Beamish's Surface Properties, which are danced by New York City Ballet and the American Ballet Theatre respectively.

== Personal life ==
In 2004, Taylor was diagnosed with immune thrombocytopenic purpura, a rare autoimmune disorder, and had her spleen removed the following year.

Taylor married fellow principal dancer Sébastien Marcovici in 2012.
