= Buena Vista Social Club (musical) =

Stage musical based on the album of the same name

- Broadway Promotional Poster
- Music: Various Artists
- Lyrics: Various Artists
- Book: Marco Ramirez
- Basis: Buena Vista Social Club (1997)
- Premiere: November 17, 2023: Atlantic Theater Company
- Productions: 2023 Off-Broadway; 2025 Broadway; 2026 Mexico City

Buena Vista Social Club is a 2023 stage musical, with a book by Marco Ramirez and featuring the music recorded by the ensemble musician group Buena Vista Social Club.

The musical is set in Havana, Cuba and spans time from the 1950s to the 1990s, following the lives of four prominent musicians, the effect communism and the rise of Fidel Castro had on musicians at the time, and their eventual collaboration in 1997 on the landmark album Buena Vista Social Club. The music in the show is presented entirely in the Spanish language, with the musical styles of son, danzón, and bolero represented in the musical score.

== Synopsis ==
The show follows a dual timeline framed by the recording of Buena Vista Social Club in 1990s Havana, during which its participants recall their pasts.

=== Act One ===
In the 1990s, young producer Juan De Marcos asks famed Cuban singer Omara Portuondo to participate in an album celebrating Cuban music, alongside established musicians including guitarist Eliades Ochoa and her longtime acquaintance Compay Segundo. Compay recalls their friendship in the 1950s, during which Omara and her sister Haydee performed at the Tropicana Club for visiting tourists.

At the invitation of Compay and his pianist friend Rubén González, Omara visits the Buenavista Social Club, an Afro-Cuban society club in Marianao. She becomes enamored with the authentic music performed there, particularly by busboy Ibrahim Ferrer. Omara seeks Ibrahim out while he is busking and the two bond over lullabies. However, Haydee — seeking to obtain a contract from Capitol Records and flee the incoming Cuban Revolution to perform abroad — disapproves of Omara's association with the club.

Now retired, Omara is reluctant to participate in the recording, but visits the studio and is cajoled into a rousing recording of "Candela". However, while performing "Dos Gardenias", she recalls her separation and estrangement from Haydee, who signed the contract and moved to the United States, and flees the studio.

=== Act Two ===
As Juan frets about the album's troubled production, Compay gives the young producer advice.

In the 1950s, Omara continues to perform at the club, and gets closer to Ibrahim. However, a producer courts Omara for a solo record, as recent orders by the new government are about to result in the closure of social clubs across the island. Omara agrees. Compay, Ibrahim and Ruben are betrayed by her decision, and the club is shut down. Omara becomes a successful solo singer.

In the present, Omara visits the site of the old club, and seems to converse with Haydee — whose death six years prior triggered her retirement. Omara begins to accept the grief and loss of her past, and reunites with Ibrahim at his busking site. Omara invites Ibrahim to participate in the album, to the delight of the other musicians.

Closing narration by Juan reveals that the album became wildly successful and triggered global interest in Cuban music.

== Production history ==
=== Off-Broadway (2023) ===
The show was developed by Saheem Ali, who also served as director. David Yazbek is a creative consultant on the show, as well as the real life Juan de Marcos González who is portrayed in the musical, Nick Gold, and Ry Cooder. Saheem Ali also serves as director, with choreography by husband and wife team Patricia Delgado and Justin Peck. The associate director is Moses Garcia, with Carlos Gonzalez as associate choreographer. Orchestrations and musical direction were by Marco Paguia and David Oquendo, alongside music supervisor Dean Sharenow. Scene design is by Arnulfo Maldonado with costume design by Dede Ayite.

The show premiered at the Atlantic Theater Company on November 17, 2023, and played until January 28, 2024, extending twice from the original end date due to high ticket sales and critical acclaim. The show was nominated for three Outer Critics Circle Awards including Best Choreography, Best Orchestrations, and Best New Off-Broadway Musical. The show was nominated for seven Lucille Lortel Awards including Outstanding Musical. At the Drama League Awards, the show was nominated for Best Direction of a Musical and Outstanding Production of a Musical.

=== Broadway (2025) ===
The musical opened for previews on Broadway at the Gerald Schoenfeld Theatre on February 21, 2025, and opened on March 19, 2025. Producers of the show include John Leguizamo and LaChanze, as well as Orin Wolf, John Styles, Jr., Barbara Broccoli and Marc Platt. The show tied for the most Tony Award nominations in 2025 alongside Death Becomes Her and Maybe Happy Ending, with a total of ten nominations including Best Musical and Best Featured Actress (for Natalie Venetia Belcon). The show leads all nominees after winning a Special Tony Award for its live musicians.

The show's cast album won the Grammy Award for Best Musical Theater Album at the 68th Annual Grammy Awards.

On January 17, 2027, the Broadway production will play its final performance after 27 previews and 767 performances.

=== National Tour (2026) ===
The first national tour began September 12, 2026 at the Shea's Performing Arts Center in Buffalo, New York. The tour is scheduled to play throughout the United States through 2027.

=== Mexico City (2026) ===
The first international production of Buena Vista Social Club outside the United States is scheduled to premiere on November 12, 2026, at Teatro de los Insurgentes in Mexico City, Mexico. Produced in Mexico by Julieta González for OCESA, the production is a replica staging of the original Broadway musical, bringing the production to an international audience for the first time.

The principal cast includes Analy as Omara Portuondo, Héctor Sandarti as Compay Segundo, Mariana Dávila as young Omara, Zark as young Compay, Coco Campo as Ibrahim Ferrer, Eric Rodríguez as young Ibrahim, Guillermo Zamora as Rubén González, César Cuervo as young Rubén, and Víctor Varona as Juan de Marcos.

=== West End (2027) ===
In June 2026, lead producer Orin Wolfe announced plans to bring the musical to the West End in 2027, with dates, cast and venue to be announced.

== Cast and characters ==
Character	Off-Broadway	Broadway	1st National Tour
Character	2023	2025	2026
Omara Portuondo (adult)	Natalie Venetia Belcon	Natalie Venetia Belcon	Karmine Alers
Omara Portuondo (young)	Kenya Browne	Isa Antonetti	Isabel Gonzalez
Ibrahim Ferrer (adult)	Mel Semé	Mel Semé	Mauro Castillo
Ibrahim Ferrer (young)	Olly Sholotan	Wesley Wray	Jaleel Battles Jr.
Rubén González	Jainardo Batista Sterling	Jainardo Batista Sterling	Robert M. Jimenez
Rubén González (young)	Leonardo Reyna	Leonardo Reyna	Irving Aday-O'Connor
Compay Segundo	Julio Monge	Julio Monge	Frank Rodriguez
Compay Segundo (young)	Jared Machado	Da’Von T. Moody	Aidan Olmo
Eliades Ochoa	Renesito Avich	Renesito Avich	San Miguel Perez
Juan de Marcos González	Luis Vega	Justin Cunningham	Holiday
Haydee Portuondo (young)	Danaya Esperanza	Ashley De La Rosa	Liana Morales

=== Notable replacements ===
Broadway

- Omara Portuondo (adult): Gina Torres
- The Narrator: Jose Iglesias
- Juan de Marcos González: Chris Myers, Xolo Maridueña

== Musical numbers ==
Act I

- "El Carretero"
- "Lágrimas Negras" (Prelude)
- "De Camino a la Vereda"
- "El Cumbanchero"
- "Veinte Años"
- "Que Bueno Baila Usted"
- "Bruca Maniguá"
- "Murmullo"
- "Drume Negrita"
- "Candela"
- "El Cumbanchero (Reprise)"
- "Dos Gardenias"

Act II

- "El Cuarto de Tula"
- "La Negra Tomasa"
- "Chan Chan"
- "Silencio"
- "Lágrimas Negras"
- "Dos Gardenias" (Reprise)
- "Bruca Maniguá" (Reprise)
- "Silencio" (Instrumental)
- "Candela" (Reprise)

== Awards and nominations ==
Year	Award	Category	Nominee(s)	Result	Ref.
2025	Drama League Awards	Outstanding Production of a Musical	Buena Vista Social Club	Nominated	
2025	Drama League Awards	Distinguished Performance	Natalie Venetia Belcon	Nominated	
2025	Tony Awards	Best Musical	Buena Vista Social Club	Nominated	
2025	Tony Awards	Best Featured Actress in a Musical	Natalie Venetia Belcon	Won	
2025	Tony Awards	Best Direction of a Musical	Saheem Ali	Nominated	
2025	Tony Awards	Best Book of a Musical	Marco Ramirez	Nominated	
2025	Tony Awards	Best Scenic Design of a Musical	Arnulfo Maldonado	Nominated	
2025	Tony Awards	Best Costume Design of a Musical	Dede Ayite	Nominated	
2025	Tony Awards	Best Lighting Design of a Musical	Tyler Micoleau	Nominated	
2025	Tony Awards	Best Sound Design of a Musical	Jonathan Deans	Won	
2025	Tony Awards	Best Choreography	Patricia Delgado and Justin Peck	Won	
2025	Tony Awards	Best Orchestrations	Marco Paguia	Won	
2025	Tony Awards	Special Tony Award	Buena Vista Social Club band	Won	
2025	Chita Rivera Awards	Outstanding Choreography in a Broadway Show	Patricia Delgado and Justin Peck	Won	
2025	Chita Rivera Awards	Outstanding Ensemble in a Broadway Show	Buena Vista Social Club	Won	
2025	Outer Critics Circle Awards	Outstanding New Off-Broadway Musical		Nominated	
2025	Outer Critics Circle Awards	Outstanding Choreography	Patricia Delgado and Justin Peck	Nominated	
2025	Outer Critics Circle Awards	Outstanding Orchestrations	Marco Paguia	Won	

== See also ==
- Buena Vista Social Club, Wim Wenders's Academy Award-nominated 1999 documentary film on the same subject
