= List of New York City Ballet dancers =

This is a list of New York City Ballet dancers.

== Principal dancers ==
Name	Joined	Promoted	Left/retired
Diana Adams	1950		1963
Heléne Alexopoulos	1978	1989	2002
Jared Angle	1998	2005	2023
Tyler Angle	2004	2009	
Alexandra Ansanelli	1996	2003	2005
Karin von Aroldingen	1962	1972	1984
Merrill Ashley	1967	1977	1997
Charles Askegard	1997	1998	2011
Mikhail Baryshnikov	1978		1979
Peter Boal	1983	1989	2005
Gilbert Bolden III	2018	2025	
Jean-Pierre Bonnefoux			
Yvonne Borree	1988	1997	2010
Ashley Bouder	2000	2005	2025
Maria Calegari	1974	1983	1994
Zachary Catazaro	2008	2017	2018
Chun Wai Chan	2021	2022	
John Clifford	1966		1980
Christopher d'Amboise			1983
Jacques d'Amboise	1949	1953	1984
Adrian Danchig-Waring	2003	2013	2026
Joaquín De Luz	2003	2005	2018
Albert Evans	1988	1995	2010
Megan Fairchild	2002	2005	2026
Robert Fairchild	2006	2009	2017
Suzanne Farrell	1961	1965	1989
Chase Finlay	2008	2013	2018
Peter Frame	1976	1988	1990
Jovani Furlan	2019	2022	
Gonzalo Garcia	2007		2022
Emilie Gerrity	2010	2023	
Joseph Gordon	2012	2018	
Melissa Hayden	1948	1955	1973
Gen Horiuchi	1982	1989	
Nikolaj Hübbe	1992		2008
Anthony Huxley	2007	2015	
Sterling Hyltin	2003	2007	2022
Russell Janzen	2008	2017	2023
Allegra Kent	1953	1957	1981
Gelsey Kirkland	1968	1972	1974
Darci Kistler	1980	1982	2010
Maria Kowroski	1995	1999	2021
Rebecca Krohn	1999	2012	2017
Ask la Cour	2002	2013	2021
Isabella LaFreniere	2014	2023	
Tanaquil Le Clercq		1948	
Lourdes Lopez	1974	1984	1997
Lauren Lovette	2010	2015	2021
Nicholas Magallanes	1948		1977
Sébastien Marcovici	1993	2002	2014
Peter Martins		1970	
Michael Maule		1950	1953
Patricia McBride	1959		
Sara Mearns	2004	2008	
Roman Mejia	2017	2023	
Benjamin Millepied	1995	2002	2011
Miriam Miller	2016	2025	
Arthur Mitchell	1955	1956	1966
Francisco Moncion	1948	1985	1985
Yvonne Mounsey	1949		1959
Mira Nadon	2018	2023	
Philip Neal	1987	1993	2010
Patricia Neary	1960		
Kyra Nichols	1974	1979	2007
Tiler Peck	2005	2009	
Unity Phelan	2013	2021	
Amar Ramasar	2001	2009	2022
Teresa Reichlen	2001	2009	2022
Jenifer Ringer	1990	2000	2014
Jennie Somogyi	1994	2000	2015
Jock Soto	1981	1985	2005
Abi Stafford	1999	2007	2021
Jonathan Stafford	1999	2007	2014
Taylor Stanley	2010	2016	
Ethan Stiefel	1989	1995	1997
Sofiane Sylve	2003		2008
Maria Tallchief	1946		1960
Janie Taylor	1998	2005	2014
Ryan Tomash	2025	2026	
Margaret Tracey	1986	1991	2002
Daniel Ulbricht	2000	2007	
Edward Villella	1957	1958, 1960	1979
Emma Von Enck	2017	2024	
Peter Walker	2012	2022	
Miranda Weese	1993	1996	2007
Robert Weiss			
Wendy Whelan	1986	1991	2014
Patricia Wilde	1950		1965
Damian Woetzel	1985	1989	2008
Indiana Woodward	2012	2021	

== Soloists ==
This is a list of New York City Ballet soloists.

Name	Joined	Promoted	Left/retired
Victor Abreu	2019	2025	
Sara Adams	2009	2017	
Dominika Afanasenkov	2022	2025	
Daniel Applebaum			
Ellen Bar	1998	2006	2011
Elyse Borne			
India Bradley	2018	2025	
Stacey Calvert			
Antonio Carmena	1999	2006	2017
Kelly Cass	1983	1988	1993
Preston Chamblee	2015	2022	
Harrison Coll	2013	2018	
Naomi Corti	2019	2025	
Meaghan Dutton-O'Hara	2012	2026	
Lois Ellyn	1948		1950
Owen Flacke	2023	2026	
Jason Fowler	1996	2006	2009
Jean-Pierre Frohlich			
David Gabriel	2022	2024	
Susan Gluck			
Tom Gold			
Gloria Govrin			
Craig Hall	2000	2007	2016
Adam Hendrickson	1998	2005	2013
Arch Higgins	1989	1998	2010
Ashley Hod	2013	2022	
Ashly Isaacs	2010	2015	2019
Denise Robison	1996	1997	1998
Emily Kikta	2011	2022	
Katrina Killian			
Lauren King	2004	2013	2021
Alec Knight	2016	2024	
Carla Körbes	2000	2005	2005
Claire Kretzschmar	2011	2018	2022
Ashley Laracey	2003	2013	
Megan LeCrone	2002	2013	2025
Edwaard Liang	1993	1998	2007
Savannah Lowery	2002	2007	2018
Jules Mabie	2019	2024	
Mary Thomas MacKinnon	2018	2025	
Olivia MacKinnon	2013	2023	
Alexa Maxwell	2013	2023	
Rebecca Metzger			
Gloria Mohr			
Kathryn Morgan	2006	2009	2012
Seth Orza	2000	2007	2007
Georgina Pazcoguin	2002	2013	2023
Justin Peck	2007	2013	
Erica Pereira	2007	2009	
Brittany Pollack	2007	2013	2026
Christine Redpath			
Davide Riccardo	2018	2023	
Rachel Rutherford	1995	2002	2011
Aarón Sanz	2012	2018	
Troy Schumacher	2005	2017	2026
Carol Sumner			
Sean Suozzi	2000	2007	
KJ Takahashi	2021	2023	
Jennifer Tinsley-Williams			
Mel Tomlinson	1981		1987
Sebastián Villarini-Vélez	2013	2018	
Kloe Walker	2024	2026	
Christopher Wheeldon	1993	1998	2000
Diana White	1977		1997
Andres Zuniga	2018	2025	
Elise Flagg	1970		1979

== Corps de ballet ==
The following is a list of the current members of the corps de ballet.

- Devin Alberda
- Olivia Bell
- Olivia Boisson
- Christina Clark
- Lauren Collett
- Nieve Corrigan
- Gabriella Domini
- Savannah Durham
- Meaghan Dutton-O'Hara
- Ariel Erez
- Oscar Estep
- Peyton Gin
- Christopher Grant
- Sierra Griffith
- Eli Raphael Gruska
- Laine Habony
- Sarah Harmon
- Kennard Henson
- Corbin Holloway
- Spartak Hoxha
- Allegra Inch
- Baily Jones
- Becket Jones
- Keenan Kiefer
- Laina Mae Kirkeide
- Charlie Klesa
- Ruby Lister
- Malorie Lundgren
- Alston Macgill
- Shelby Mann
- Noah McAuslin
- Hugo Mestres
- Maya Milić
- Vanessa Mlyniec
- Simeon Daniel Neeld
- Alexander Perone
- Lucie Richard
- Ava Sautter
- Grace Scheffel
- Mary Elizabeth Sell
- Anna Snellgrove
- Mckenzie Bernardino Soares
- Quinn Starner
- Kennedy Targosz
- Rommie Tomasini
- Claire Von Enck
- Kloe Walker
- Cainan Weber
- Kylie Takeno Williams
- Mia Williams
- Shane Williams

=== Former corps de ballet ===
- Dena Abergel
- Faye Arthurs
- Aesha Ash
- Briana Atkins
- Debra Austin
- Austin Bachman
- Callie Bachman
- Amy Barker
- Darius Barnes
- Toni Bentley
- Katie Bergstrom
- Saskia Beskow
- Jenny Blascovich
- Jacqueline Bologna
- Megan Bonneau
- Paul Boos
- Susan Borree
- Mary Helen Bowers
- Likolani Brown
- Wilhelm Burmann
- Stephanie Chrosniak
- Emily Coates
- Maya Collins
- Cara Copeland
- Cameron Dieck
- Alina Drunova
- Sophie Flack
- Paul Frame
- Dorothy Froehlich
- Kurt Froman
- Kyle Froman
- Kaitlyn Gilliland
- Pauline Golbin
- Sam Greenberg
- Amanda Hankes
- Brittany Hillyer
- Darla Hoover
- Dana Jacobson
- Dara Johnson
- Viktoria Kay
- Glenn Keenan
- Claire Kim
- Ashlee Knapp
- Austin Laurent
- Robert Lyon
- Zoe Bliss Magnussen
- Lindy Mandradjieff
- Jenelle Manzi
- Samuel Melnikov
- Gwyneth Muller
- Courtney Muscroft
- Lars Nelson
- Ellen Ostrom
- Vincent Paradiso
- Allen Peiffer
- Roger Peterson
- Rachel Piskin
- David Prottas
- Maxwell Read
- Matthew Renko
- Tabitha Rinko-Gay
- Shoshana Rosenfield
- Kristen Segin
- Henry Seth
- Aaron Severini
- Briana Shepherd
- Kristin Sloan
- Mimi Staker
- Lynne Stetson
- Joshua Thew
- Lara Tong
- Ulrik Trojaborg
- Max van der Sterre
- Elizabeth Walker
- Lydia Wellington
- Garielle Whittle
- Katharine Wildish
- Sarah-Rose Williams
- Deborah Wingert
- Stephanie Zungre

== Janice Levin Award dancers ==
The Janice Levin Dancer Award was created in 2000 by an endowment gift from the late Mrs. Levin, and is bestowed annually on a promising member of NYCB's corps de ballet.

- 2025 – 2026 – Malorie Lundgren
- 2024 – 2025 – Victor Abreu
- 2023 – 2024 – Naomi Corti
- 2022 – 2023 – KJ Takahashi
- 2021 – 2022 – India Bradley
- 2021 – 2022 – Davide Riccardo
- 2019 – 2020 – Baily Jones
- 2018 – 2019 – Kristen Segin
- 2017 – 2018 – Harrison Coll
- 2016 – 2017 – Claire Kretzschmar
- 2015 – 2016 – Joseph Gordon
- 2014 – 2015 – Ashly Isaacs
- 2013 – 2014 – Harrison Ball
- 2012 – 2013 – Lauren Lovette
- 2011 – 2012 – Taylor Stanley
- 2010 – 2011 – Anthony Huxley
- 2009 – 2010 – Kaitlyn Gilliland
- 2008 – 2009 – Kathryn Morgan
- 2007 – 2008 – Tyler Angle
- 2006 – 2007 – Tiler Peck
- 2005 – 2006 – Sterling Hyltin
- 2004 – 2005 – Teresa Reichlen
- 2003 – 2004 – Daniel Ulbricht
- 2002 – 2003 – Ashley Bouder
- 2001 – 2002 – Carla Körbes
- 2000 – 2001 – Abi Stafford

== See also ==
- Category:New York City Ballet dancers
- In the Wings: Behind the Scenes at the New York City Ballet, 2007 book
- List of female dancers
- Alexandra Waterbury
