= Isa Antonetti =

21st-century musical theater actress

Isa Antonetti is an American musical theater actress. She played the role of Young Omara in the 2025 original Broadway production of Buena Vista Social Club.

== Early life and education ==
Antonetti grew up in the Greater Rochester area of upstate New York. Growing up, she performed with her father's Latin band, Orquesta Antonetti. She was in her first musical in high school, where she discovered a passion for performance. Her first live theater role was Gabriella in High School Musical 2.

Antonetti graduated Carnegie Mellon University with a BFA in Musical Theatre.

== Career ==
At the age of 15, she auditioned for Maria in the film remake of West Side Story, where she made it far enough into auditions to sing for Steven Spielberg and Tony Kushner.

Antonetti performed in the New York City Center's 2019 Off-Broadway production of Evita. In 2023, she played the lead role, Mili, in Gift of Fear, a film about human trafficking among Indigenous women.

In September 2024, it was announced that Antonetti would be making her Broadway debut as Young Omara in Buena Vista Social Club, with Natalie Venetia Belcon playing Adult Omara. The show began previews on February 21, 2025, and opened on March 19, 2025.

== Personal life ==
Antonetti is American of latino background, Indigenous, Mixed-Race, and LGBTQIA+.
