= Joseph Gordon =

Joe or Joseph Gordon may refer to:

- Joe Gordon (1915–1978), American baseball player
- Joe Gordon (cricketer), English cricketer
- Joe Gordon (musician) (1928–1963), American jazz trumpeter
- Joseph Abraham Gordon (1934–2016), Jamaican-Canadian ska singer known as Lord Tanamo
- Joseph Maria Gordon (1856–1929), Australian general
- Joseph Gordon (politician), member of the 111th New York State Legislature

== See also ==
- Joseph Gordon-Levitt (born 1981), American actor
