= Peter Frame =

American ballet dancer and dance teacher (1957–2018)

- Born: April 16, 1957; Charleston, West Virginia, U.S.
- Died: August 30, 2018 (aged 61); Manhattan, New York, U.S.
- Education: School of American Ballet
- Occupation: Ballet dancer
- Dancing career
- Former groups: New York City Ballet

Peter Frame (April 16, 1957 – August 30, 2018) was an American ballet dancer and dance teacher. He danced with New York City Ballet from 1976 until 1990 and was elevated to the rank of principal dancer in 1988. He was a faculty member at the School of American Ballet from 1993 until his death in 2018.

== Early life ==
Peter Frame was born on April 16, 1957, in Charleston, West Virginia, to Marvan and Mary Elizabeth Frame. He was one of five children and had a twin brother, Paul Frame, who also danced with New York City Ballet. He began his ballet training under the direction of Jerry Rose.

== Career ==
Frame enrolled at the School of American Ballet before joining the New York City Ballet, where he danced for fourteen years. In 1986, Frame, then a soloist, was selected to re-stage Variations, Opus 30 from Episodes, a collaborative work between George Balanchine and Martha Graham set to music by Anton Webern, that had originally been performed by Paul Taylor. Episodes had been dropped from the ballet in 1961, after Taylor stopped performing the solo, until it was taught to Frame. He was promoted to the rank of principal dancer in 1988, shortly after his first performance of Episodes. Two years later, Frame performed as a guest artist with Paul Taylor Dance Company. In 2014, Frame staged Episodes for Miami City Ballet, the first time it had been performed since he had danced the role.

In 1979, Frame was an original cast member of the ballets Sonate di Scarlatti and The Four Seasons. In 1981, he danced in the ballet In the Night. In 1983, he danced in the ballet Interplay. He was an original cast member of the 1983 ballet Glass Pieces. In 1987, he was an original cast member of the ballet Ecstatic Orange.

After retiring from the stage in 1990, he joined the faculty at the School of American Ballet in 1993 where he taught strength training and conditioning classes for male dancers. He also began teaching at Ballet Academy East in 1999.

== Death ==
Frame died by suicide on August 30, 2018, after jumping off of the fifth-story apartment at 145 West 75th Street on the Upper West Side of Manhattan.
