= Brandon Stirling Baker =

American lighting designer

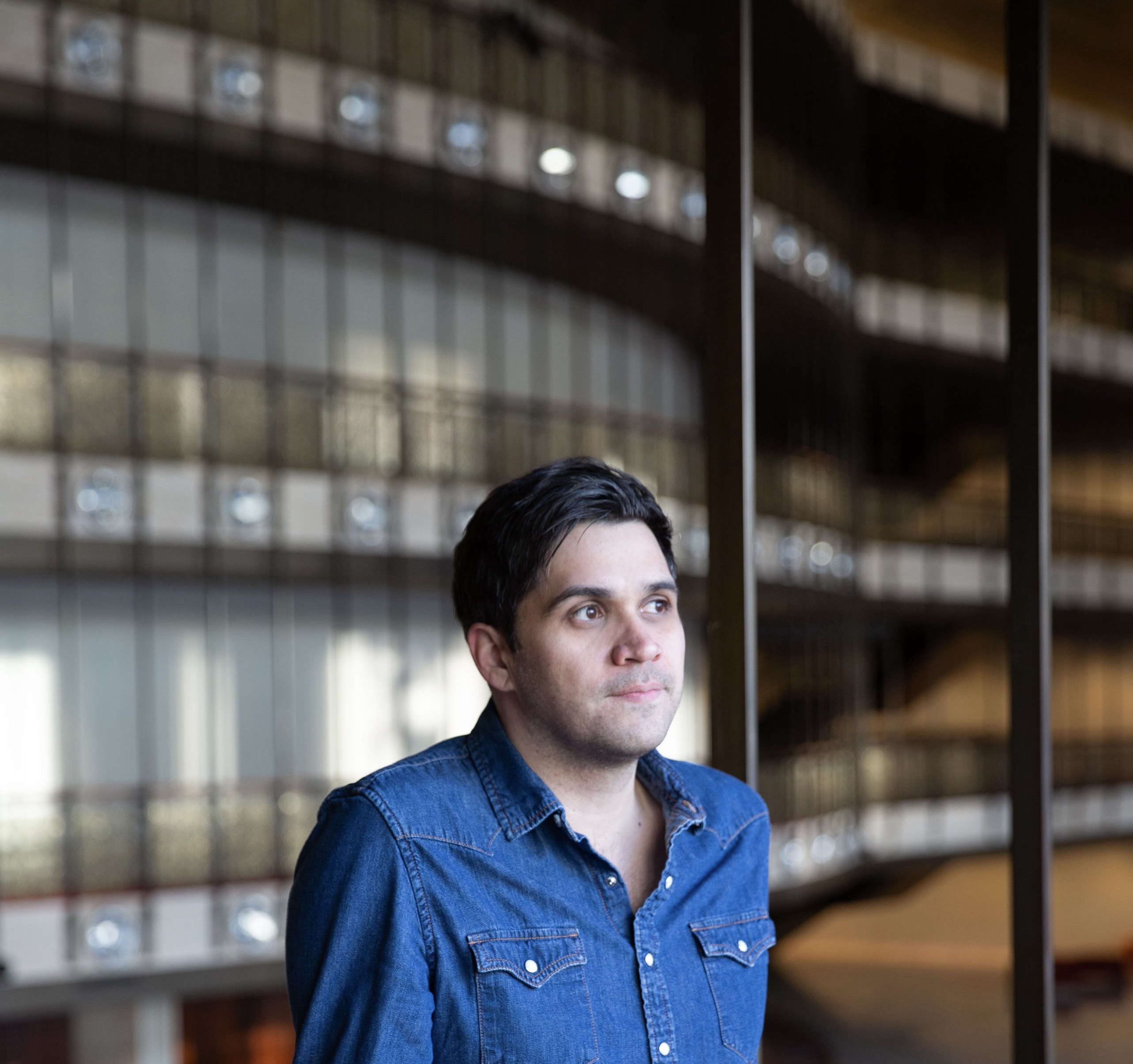
- Brandon Stirling Baker at New York City Ballet
- Citizenship: American
- Occupation: Lighting designer

Brandon Stirling Baker is an American lighting designer working internationally in ballet, opera and theatre. Baker received a 2024 Tony Award nomination for Best Lighting Design in a Musical for his design of Illinoise on Broadway.

== Biography ==
Brandon Stirling Baker's lighting can be seen on Broadway and in the repertories of New York City Ballet, American Ballet Theatre, Miami City Ballet, San Francisco Ballet, The Australian Ballet, Dutch National Ballet, Hong Kong Ballet, Finnish National Ballet, Staatsballett Berlin, Joffrey Ballet, Pacific Northwest Ballet, Houston Ballet, Boston Ballet, Semperoper Ballet Dresden, Alvin Ailey American Dance Theater, Royal Danish Ballet, The Royal Ballet, Paul Taylor Dance Company, and Opera Philadelphia.

Baker has designed over 30 premieres worldwide for choreographer Justin Peck, and works frequently with choreographers Jamar Roberts and William Forsythe.

He received a 2019 Knight of Illumination award for his work on Justin Peck's Reflections at the Houston Ballet.

Baker studied at the California Institute of the Arts, Royal Scottish Academy of Music & Drama in Glasgow, Scotland, and the Yale School of Drama as a Special Research Fellow.

== Notable Collaborations ==
- 2025: Art of the Fuge by Alexei Ratmansky
- 2023: Copland Dance Episodes by Justin Peck
- 2020: The Barre Project by William Forsythe
- 2017: The Times Are Racing by Justin Peck
- 2015: Heatscape by Justin Peck
- 2014: Everywhere We Go by Justin Peck and Sufjan Stevens

== Educator ==
Baker is a lecturer of design at the David Geffen School of Drama at Yale University and previously served on the faculty of Vassar College.

During the 2025–2026 academic year, Baker was appointed a visiting scholar at The Center for Ballet and the Arts at New York University.
