= Paz de la Jolla =

Contemporary ballet choreographed by Justin Peck for the New York City Ballet

Paz de la Jolla is a contemporary ballet choreographed by Justin Peck for the New York City Ballet. It is Peck's third choreographed piece, the 422nd ballet choreographed for the New York City Ballet, and its creation was featured in the documentary Ballet 422. The costumes were designed by Reid Bartelme and Harriet Jung with supervision from Marc Happel, with lighting by Mark Stanley The 20-minute piece features 18 dancers and premiered on January 13, 2013.

== Ballet ==
The piece is inspired by Peck's childhood in southern California. He drew this concept from the score, Bohuslav Martinů’s Sinfonietta la Jolla, which itself is a tribute to La Jolla, a suburb of San Diego. The choreography showcases Peck's ability to manipulate groups of dancers in complicated formations and patterns, as well as quick, detailed ballet phrasing. These elements are hallmarks of Peck's own personal style, but also reveal the influence of George Balanchine, founder of the New York City Ballet and the School of American Ballet, where Peck underwent the majority of his ballet training. The cast consists of 15 members of the corps de ballet and 3 principal dancers. The ballet was premiered at the New York City Ballet in 2013 and was also performed by The National Ballet of Canada in June 2018.

The ballet's plot, a love story, begins with a couple meeting on the beach, the male lead, wearing a dark blue and grey costume, bumping into his partner. The ballerina, wearing a white dress, then gets lost in a fast-moving crowd of the supporting dancers. When the couple is reunited, she embraces her counterpart and they lay down together, watching the ocean, made of the members of the corps. They go to sleep, but the female dancer wakes and swims into the ocean. Once the male dancer realizes she is gone, he dives in after her. The corps de ballet, an integral part of the piece, is led by the third principal dancer, a female dancer in a teal swimsuit, who plays the liveliest girl on the beach.

=== Costumes ===
The costumes were designed by Reid Bartelme and Harriet Jung, also known as the design duo Reid & Harriet. The female dancers wear bathing suits, the men tees and shorts, to implant the dancers into the beachfront setting. To transform the dancers into the ocean, the dancers wear translucent blue tunics on top of their original costumes. The male lead is dressed in a dark blue-grey sleeveless boat-neck shirt and grey and blue striped shorts. His female counterpart wears an off-white V-neck dress. The other female principal dancer wears a light teal swimsuit with a chiffon halter-neck and a belt with a bow.

=== Music ===
Sinfonietta la Jolla was composed by Bohuslav Martinů, a Czech composer. The score was commissioned by the Musical Arts Society of La Jolla and was first performed by the Orchestra of the Musical Arts Society of La Jolla on August 13, 1950. The piece has three movements: Poco allegro, Largo – andante moderato, and Allegro.

== Ballet 422 ==
Ballet 422, a film directed by Jody Lee Lipes, follows Peck during the two months in which he choreographed and produced Paz de la Jolla. The film focuses on Peck's creative process and the work he put in leading up to the premiere, including shots of him during the first stages of choreographing the piece, teaching the ballet to the cast, working with costume designers Reid Bartelme and Harriet Jung and the costume department of the New York City Ballet, staging it with the lighting director, Mark Stanley, talking to the orchestra, and on the night of the premiere. The film was nominated for the Documentary Award at the Seattle International Film Festival, the Jury Award at the Tribeca Film Festival, and the Golden Eye at the Zurich Film Festival.
