= Apollo (ballet) =

1927–1928 ballet by Igor Stravinsky

Apollo or Apollon musagète
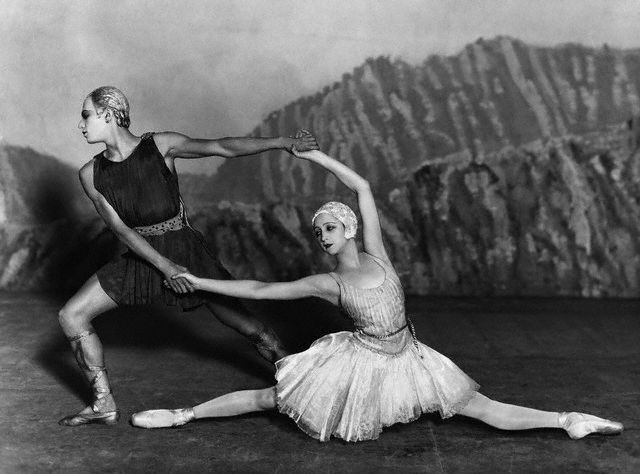
- Alexandra Danilova and Serge Lifar
- Choreographer: Adolph Bolm, George Balanchine
- Music: Igor Stravinsky
- Libretto: Igor Stravinsky
- Premiere: 27 April 1928 (Bolm); 12 June 1928 (Balanchine); Washington, D.C. (Bolm); Paris (Balanchine)
- Original ballet company: Ballets Russes (Balanchine)
- Characters: Apollo three Muses: Calliope, the muse of poetry Polyhymnia, the muse of rhetoric Terpsichore, the muse of dance
- Design: André Bauchant
- Setting: Classical antiquity
- Genre: Neoclassical ballet
- Type: Classical ballet

Apollo (originally Apollon musagète and variously known as Apollo musagetes, Apolo Musageta, and Apollo, Leader of the Muses) is a neoclassical ballet in two tableaux composed between 1927 and 1928 by Igor Stravinsky. It was choreographed in 1928 by twenty-four-year-old George Balanchine, with the composer contributing the libretto. The scenery and costumes were designed by André Bauchant, with new costumes by Coco Chanel in 1929. The scenery was executed by Alexander Shervashidze, with costumes under the direction of Mme. A. Youkine. The American patron of the arts Elizabeth Sprague Coolidge had commissioned the ballet in 1927 for a festival of contemporary music to be held the following year at the Library of Congress in Washington, D.C.

The story centres on Apollo, the Greek god of music, who is visited by three Muses: Terpsichore, muse of dance and song; Polyhymnia, muse of mime; and Calliope, muse of poetry. The ballet takes Classical antiquity as its subject, though its plot suggests a contemporary situation. It is concerned with the reinvention of tradition, since its inspiration is Baroque, Classical, or even post-baroque/rococo/galant.

It is scored for chamber orchestra of 34 string instruments (8.8.6.8.4).

== Music ==
Stravinsky began composing Apollo on 16 July 1927 and completed the score on 9 January 1928. He composed for a refined instrumental force, a string orchestra of 34 instrumentalists: 8 first violins, 8 second violins, 6 violas, 4 first cellos, 4 second cellos and 4 double basses.

The commission from the Library of Congress and underwritten by Mrs. Elizabeth Sprague Coolidge paid him $1,000 for the piece, which was required to use only six dancers, require a small orchestra, and last no more than half an hour, but allowed him free choice of subject. Stravinsky had been thinking of writing a ballet on an episode in Greek mythology for some time and decided to make Apollo, leader of the muses, its central figure while reducing the number of muses from nine to three. They were Terpsichore, personifying the rhythm of poetry and the eloquence of gesture as embodied in the dance; Calliope, combining poetry and rhythm; and Polyhymnia, representing mime.

Stravinsky originally titled the work Apollon musagète, the French transliteration of Apollo Musagetes. This is one of the many classical epithets of Apollo and signifies the god's mythological role as the leader of the Muses and the divine patron of music and dance.

Stravinsky wrote for a homogeneous ensemble of bowed string instruments, substituting contrasts in dynamics for the contrasts in timbre he employed in Pulcinella. The ballet takes its inspiration from the grand tradition of French 17th- and 18th-century music, in particular that of Lully, a source Stravinsky returned to when composing Agon in 1957. The prologue begins with dotted rhythms in the style of a French overture. The work relies on a basic rhythmic cell, presented at the beginning of the work, which Stravinsky transforms by subdivisions of successive values that become increasingly complex. Stravinsky revised the score slightly in 1947. In 1963, he indicated he intended to make further changes, particularly with respect to double-dotting many of the dotted-rhythm passages in Baroque style.

== Ballet ==
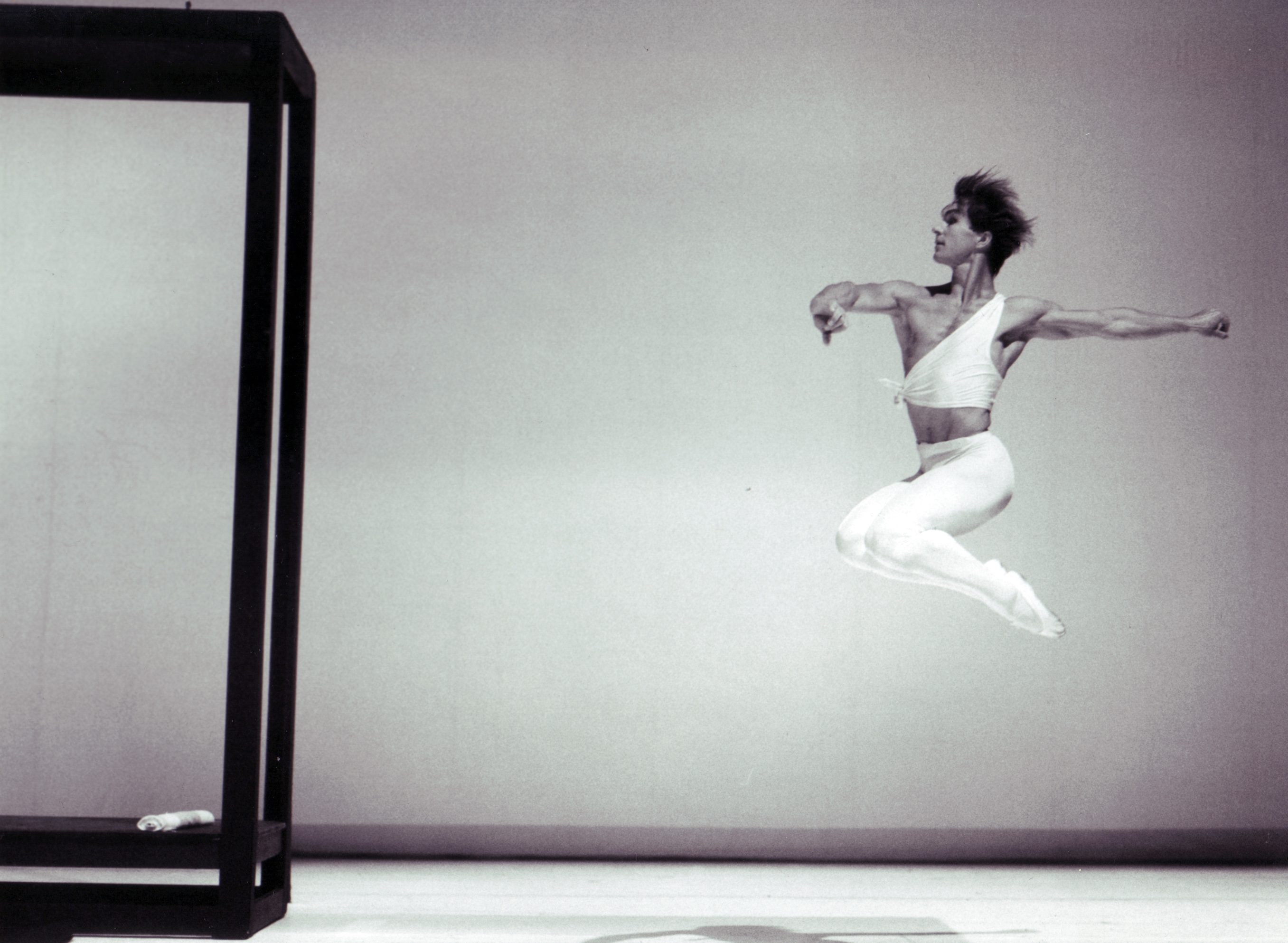
Falco Kapuste as Apollo

The first ballet version of Stravinsky's Apollon musagète, commissioned especially for the Washington festival, premiered on 27 April 1928 with choreography by Adolph Bolm, who also danced the role of Apollo. Adolph Bolm put together a company of dancers for the premiere in a country which, at that time, lacked a readily available source of classically trained dancers. Ruth Page, Berenice Holmes (Gene Kelly's ballet teacher), and Elise Reiman were the three Muses and Hans Kindler conducted. Stravinsky took no interest in the U.S. performance, and Bolm's choreography is now practically forgotten.

He had reserved the European rights to the score for Sergei Diaghilev, whose Ballets Russes production, choreographed by the 24-year-old Balanchine, opened at the Théâtre Sarah Bernhardt in Paris on 12 June 1928. Stravinsky conducted the performance. The concertmaster was Marcel Darrieux.

In accordance with Stravinsky's wishes, the style of dancing was essentially classical, and Stravinsky thought of "Apollon musagète" as a ballet blanc, that is, costumed in traditional minimal white. Balanchine later said that when he heard Stravinsky's music all he could see was pristine white. The clarity, calm, even serenity of the music makes it seem infinitely remote from the colorful excitement of Stravinsky's earlier ballets. The avoidance of any conflict in the scenario, of any narrative, psychological or expressive intent, was further matched by monochrome costumes for the dancers and the absence of elaborate scenery on stage.

Scenery and costumes for Balanchine's production were by French artist André Bauchant. Coco Chanel provided new costumes in 1929. Apollo wore a reworked toga with a diagonal cut, a belt, and laced up sandals. The Muses wore traditional tutus. The decoration was baroque: two large sets, with some rocks and Apollo's chariot.

The scenario involved the birth of Apollo, his interactions with the three Muses, Calliope (poetry), Polyhymnia (mime) and Terpsichore (dance and song), and his ascent as a god to Mount Parnassus. The original cast included Serge Lifar as Apollo, Alice Nikitina as Terpsichore (alternating with Alexandra Danilova), Lubov Tchernicheva as Calliope, Felia Doubrovska as Polyhymnia and Sophie Orlova as Leto, mother of Apollo.

For a revival with Mikhail Baryshnikov as Apollo in 1979, he also omitted Apollo's first variation and re-choreographed the ballet's ending. This revision concluded not with Apollo's ascent to Mount Parnassus but rather with moving the "peacock" tableau of the Muses in arabesques of ascending height beside Apollo, which originally happened slightly earlier, to the final pose. In the 1980 staging for the New York City Ballet, Apollo's first variation was restored.

Suzanne Farrell restored the birth scene for her company in 2001, as did Arthur Mitchell for his Dance Theatre of Harlem performance at Symphony Space's Wall to Wall Balanchine in conjunction with City Ballet's Balanchine centennial and Iain Webb for The Sarasota Ballet's Tribute to Nureyev performance in February 2015 (staged by Sandra Jennings).

=== Form ===
The characters are Apollo and three muses: Calliope, the muse of poetry; Polyhymnia, the muse of rhetoric; and Terpsichore, the muse of dance. The theme is: Apollon musagetes instructs the muses in their arts and leads them to Parnassus. The ballet is divided into two tableaux:

- First tableau
  - Prologue: The Birth of Apollo
- Second tableau
  - Variation of Apollo
  - Pas d'action (Apollo and the Three Muses)
  - Variation of Calliope (the Alexandrine)
  - Variation of Polyhymnia
  - Variation of Terpsichore
  - Second Variation of Apollo
  - Pas de deux
  - Coda
  - Apotheosis

== Other premieres ==
- American Ballet Theatre first premiered the ballet in 1943 in New York City at the Metropolitan Opera House.
- The New York City Ballet premiere was 15 November 1951, at City Center of Music and Drama, New York.
- The Royal Ballet premiere was on 15 November 1966, with Donald MacLeary as Apollo, Svetlana Beriosova as Terpsichore, Monica Mason as Polyhymnia and Georgina Parkinson as Calliope.
- The first performance of the Balanchine work in Australia was by the Australian Ballet on 3 May 1991, when it was staged for the company by Karin von Aroldingen, former leading artist of New York City Ballet. On opening night, Steven Heathcote danced the role of Apollo with Justine Miles as Calliope, Miranda Coney as Polyhymnia and Lisa Pavane as Terpsichore.
- First performance by Birmingham Royal Ballet was on 24 September 2003 at the Birmingham Hippodrome.
- The Stravinsky score was used by Margaret Scott in creating her version of Apollon Musagete for the Ballet Guild in 1951, by Charles Lisner in his 1962 version for the Queensland Ballet, and by Robin Grove in his 1967 production for the Victorian Ballet Company.
- The first performance of the Balanchine work in South America was in Peru by the Ballet Nacional del Peru on September 8, 2017. It was staged for the company by Elyse Borne, former soloist of New York City Ballet who had performed the role of Polyhymnia herself under Balanchine's staging.

== Casts ==
| Role | World premiere (1928) | US premiere (1937) | American Ballet Theatre premiere (1943) | New York City Ballet premiere (1951) | The Royal Ballet premiere (1966) | The Australian Ballet premiere (1991) |
|---|---|---|---|---|---|---|
| Apollo | Serge Lifar | Lew Christensen | André Eglevsky | André Eglevsky | Donald MacLeary | Steven Heathcote |
| Terpsichore | Alice Nikitina | Elise Reiman | Vera Zorina | Maria Tallchief | Svetlana Beriosova | Lisa Pavane |
| Polyhymnia | Lubov Tchernicheva | Holly Howard | Nora Kaye | Tanaquil Le Clercq | Monica Mason | Miranda Coney |
| Calliope | Felia Dubrovska | Daphne Vane | Rosella Hightower | Diana Adams | Georgina Parkinson | Justine Miles |

== Further information ==
Balanchine shortened the title to Apollo in the 1950s, which Stravinsky himself came to prefer. Despite the popularly considered Balanchine-Stravinsky Greek link due to Balanchine's later work with Stravinsky scores in Orpheus and Agon, the music for Apollo was commissioned by the Library of Congress. Orpheus may be considered a sequel to Apollo but Agon is a formal plotless ballet whose title in Greek evokes a contest.

== Recordings ==
In light of the impact of the COVID-19 pandemic on the performing arts, New York City Ballet released a recording featuring Taylor Stanley, Tiler Peck, Brittany Pollack, and Indiana Woodward, filmed in 2019.
