= Répétiteur =

Accompanist or coach of ballet dancers or opera singers

A répétiteur (French pronunciation: [ʁepetitœʁ]; from the French verb répéter meaning 'to repeat, to go over, to rehearse') is an accompanist, tutor or coach of ballet dancers or opera singers. The feminine form is répétitrice.

== Opera ==
In opera, a répétiteur is the person responsible for coaching singers and playing the piano for music and production rehearsals. When coaching solo singers or choir members, the répétiteur will take on a number of the roles of a vocal coach, including advising singers on how to improve their pitch and pronunciation, and correcting note or phrasing errors.

Répétiteurs are skilled musicians who have strong sight-reading and score reading skills. In addition to being able to sight read piano parts, some répétiteurs can play on the piano an orchestral score reducing it in real-time (orchestral reduction), by reading from a large open score of all of the instruments and voice parts. Répétiteurs are also skilled in following the directions of a conductor, in terms of changing the tempo, pausing, or adding other nuances.

== Ballet ==
In ballet, a répétiteur teaches the steps and interpretation of the roles to some or all of the company performing a dance. Several late 20th-century choreographers, such as George Balanchine, Jerome Robbins, Gerald Arpino and Twyla Tharp, have established trusts and appointed conservators—hand-picked dancers who have intimate knowledge of particular ballets—as répétiteurs of their works.
