= Robbie Fairchild =

American dancer and actor (born 1987)

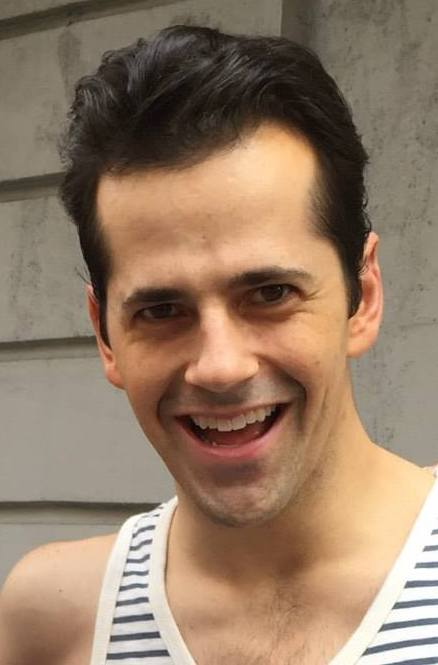
- Fairchild in An American in Paris 2015
- Born: June 9, 1987 (age 39)
- Education: School of American Ballet
- Occupations: Dancer, actor
- Spouse: Tiler Peck (m. 2014; div. 2017)
- Relatives: Megan Fairchild (sister)

Robbie Fairchild (born June 9, 1987) is an American dancer and actor. He is best known for originating the role of Jerry Mulligan in the musical An American in Paris, and as Munkustrap in the 2019 film Cats. He was a principal dancer at the New York City Ballet.

== Early and personal life ==
Fairchild was raised in Salt Lake City. His mother is a dietitian, and his father worked for Utah's wildlife resources. He started dancing at the age of four, and began formal ballet training at age ten. After attending the School of American Ballet's summer intensives in 2002 and 2003, he relocated to New York City and enrolled in the school as a full-time student in fall 2003.

Fairchild's elder sister, Megan, is a principal dancer with New York City Ballet.

In a 2026 interview, Fairchild spoke about coming out at age 17, then later undergoing conversion therapy for five years, before coming out again at age 30 after ending his marriage to Tiler Peck.

== Career ==
=== Dance ===
Fairchild became an apprentice at the New York City Ballet in 2005, and joined the company's corps de ballet the following year. He became a soloist in 2007 and principal dancer in 2009. During his time in the company, he had danced works by George Balanchine, Jerome Robbins, Christopher Wheeldon, Alexei Ratmansky and Justin Peck.

In October 2017, Fairchild left the company after a performance of Balanchine's Duo Concertant, in which he danced with his longtime stage partner, Sterling Hyltin.

=== Acting ===
In December 2014, Fairchild starred as Jerry Mulligan in the musical An American in Paris, directed and choreographed by Christopher Wheeldon, in Théâtre du Châtelet, Paris, which ran until January 2015. The musical also starred Leanne Cope. The musical transferred to Palace Theatre on Broadway the same year. The previews began in March and officially opened on April 12. He and Cope starred in the show until his departure in March 2016. He was nominated for a Tony Award for Best Actor in a Musical in 2015 In 2017, the show premiered in Dominion Theatre on West End. Fairchild and Cope returned to the show, though he only stayed for three months.

Fairchild had also starred in A Chorus Line at the Hollywood Bowl, Oklahoma! at the Royal Albert Hall in London and Brigadoon at the New York City Center.

He played Munkustrap in Cats, the 2019 film adaptation of the stage musical of the same name. He also appeared in the 2019 Netflix series, Soundtrack.

In 2024, Fairchild starred in the stage adaptation of the film The Artist on the West End. He played George Valentin, a silent film era star who finds his career in jeopardy when the "talkies" become popular.

In 2026, he appeared in a season three episode, "Valerie Gets a New Chapter", of The Comeback as a Broadway assistant director, Geoffrey.

=== Other ventures ===
In 2020, in the midst of the COVID-19 pandemic, Fairchild started his floral arrangement business, boo.kay, which was intended to be a "side hustle". The company closed in 2024.

== Awards and nominations ==
| Year | Award | Category | Work | Result | Ref. |
|---|---|---|---|---|---|
| 2015 | Tony Award | Best Leading Actor in a Musical | An American in Paris | Nominated | |
| 2015 | Drama Desk Award | Outstanding Actor in a Musical | An American in Paris | Won | |
| 2015 | Outer Critics Circle Award | Outstanding Actor in a Musical | An American in Paris | Won | |
| 2015 | Drama League Award | Distinguished Performance | An American in Paris | Nominated | |
| 2015 | Fred and Adele Astaire Award | Outstanding Male Dancer in a Broadway Show | An American in Paris | Won | |
| 2015 | Theatre World Award | | An American in Paris | Won | |
| 2018 | Chita Rivera Award | Outstanding Male Dancer in an Off-Broadway Show | Frankenstein | Won | |
