= The Four Seasons (ballet) =

The Four Seasons is a ballet choreographed by New York City Ballet ballet master Jerome Robbins to excerpts from Giuseppe Verdi's I Vespri Siciliani (1855), I Lombardi (1843), and Il Trovatore (1853). The premiere took place on 18 January 1979 at the New York State Theater, Lincoln Center, with scenery and costumes by Santo Loquasto and lighting by Jennifer Tipton.

== Original cast ==
- Lucinda Murdoch
- Eliana Dipietro
- Elli Trimble
- Stephanie Saland
- Maria Calegari
- Patricia McBride
- David Richardson
- Joseph Duell
- Peter Frame
- Francis Sackett
- Daniel Duell
- Bart Cook
- Mikhail Baryshnikov
- Jean-Pierre Frohlich
- Gerard Ebitz

== Other companies ==
- Perm Opera and Ballet Theatre, premiered April 13, 2007 along with The Concert.

== Articles ==
- NY Times, Jack Anderson, January 14, 1979

== Reviews ==
- NY Times, Alastair Macaulay, January 21, 2008
- NY Times, Jack Anderson, June 4, 1985
- NY Times, Anna Kisselgoff, January 20, 1979
