= Justin Peck =

American choreographer, director, and dancer (born 1987)

- Peck in 2026
- Born: September 8, 1987 (age 39); Washington, D.C., U.S.
- Education: School of American Ballet
- Occupations: Choreographer, dancer
- Years active: 2006–present
- Spouse: Patricia Delgado
- Children: 1
- Dancing career
- Current group: New York City Ballet
- Website: justin-peck.com

Justin Peck (born September 8, 1987) is an American choreographer, director, and dancer associated with New York City Ballet, of which he was appointed Resident Choreographer in July 2014, the second person (after Christopher Wheeldon) to hold this title. A three-time Tony Award for Best Choreography recipient, he won in 2018 for the revival of Rodgers and Hammerstein's Carousel, in 2024 for the Sufjan Stevens original dance musical, Illinoise and in 2025 for Buena Vista Social Club. On film, Peck choreographed the dance sequences for Steven Spielberg musical adaptation West Side Story (2021) and Bradley Cooper's biographical drama Maestro (2023).

== Early life and education ==
Peck was born in Washington, D.C., and grew up in San Diego, California. His father was from New York and his mother was of Ukrainian descent, born and raised in Argentina. He began tap dancing when he was nine years old, after seeing a performance of Bring in 'da Noise. When Peck was 13, he witnessed a performance of American Ballet Theatre in Giselle which inspired him to begin training in the ballet form. At 15 years old, Peck moved to New York City to attend the School of American Ballet.

== Career ==
=== 2006–2012: Early work and breakthrough ===
In 2006, when he was 18 years old, he was invited by Peter Martins to join the New York City Ballet as an apprentice. In Spring 2007, he was promoted to corps de ballet. In February 2013, he was promoted to soloist. At New York City Ballet, Peck has danced extensive repertoire, performing in existing and new works by George Balanchine, Jerome Robbins, Peter Martins, Benjamin Millepied, Alexei Ratmansky, Lynne Taylor-Corbett, and Christopher Wheeldon. In 2012, he choreographed In Creases, his first work created for New York City Ballet. He has since created more than 25 works for companies such as New York City Ballet, San Francisco Ballet, Pacific Northwest Ballet, Houston Ballet, Miami City Ballet, LA Dance Project, and Paris Opera Ballet.

=== 2013–2019: Established work ===
Alastair Macaulay, the chief dance critic at The New York Times, described Peck in an article as "the third important choreographer to have emerged in classical ballet this century." In 2014, Peck was named the New York City Ballet's Resident Choreographer, the youngest and only the second ever to hold the position. Peck is the focus of the 2014 Jody Lee Lipes documentary Ballet 422. Ballet 422 follows Peck's process of creating Paz de la Jolla for the New York City Ballet, focusing on aspects such as choreography, staging, lighting, and costumes. The movie was filmed and directed by Jody Lee Lipes, an American cinematographer known for his cinematography in the television show Girls and film Manchester by the Sea.

Peck has worked with composers Sufjan Stevens, Bryce Dessner (of the band The National), Caroline Shaw, Dan Deacon, Steve Reich, and Philip Glass. He has also collaborated with visual artists Shepard Fairey, Marcel Dzama, Sterling Ruby, John Baldessari, Steve Powers, George Condo; fashion designers Humberto Leon (Opening Ceremony, Kenzo), Dries Van Noten, Tsumori Chisato, Mary Katrantzou, and Prabal Gurung; and directors Steven Spielberg, Sofia Coppola, Damian Chazelle, and Jody Lee Lipes. He has contributed to the fashion world, working with Vogue, Harper's Bazaar, Nowness, Vogue China, Vogue Australia, DuJour magazine, Vulture, New York Magazine, and others. The New York Times has said that "Mr. Peck has quickly become the most eminent choreographer of ballet in the United States," and that "young Mr. Peck can do anything he wants with choreography: a virtuoso of the form."

Peck provided the choreography for the third Broadway revival of Rodgers and Hammerstein's Carousel in 2018 at the Imperial Theatre. Alastair Macaulay of The New York Times praised his work on the production writing, "His works, polished and contemporary, are energetic through each individual body and in striking ensembles; and they often ask gender questions, with both opposite-sex and same-sex pairings...In almost every piece he tackles, he adds to his already impressive accomplishments". For his work Peck earned the Tony Award for Best Choreography.

=== 2020–present: Career expansion ===
Peck made his first foray into film choreographing dance sequences in Steven Spielberg's musical drama West Side Story (2021). Of the experience he said that "they approached this with a sense of reverence and admiration for the original...But for this updated version, he makes the dances more menacing." Peck stated of collaborating with Spielberg, "There was a process of working toward understanding it that Steven went through, and that we were in constant dialogue about. It was helping him understand the full range of what dance could express in a moment — that it was its own tool of language that could run throughout this film in the same way that words could or visuals could".

A few years later Peck worked on Bradley Cooper's biographical drama Maestro (2023) about the complicated marriage between the composer Leonard Bernstein and his wife Felicia Montealegre. Peck choreographed the imaginary dance sequence involving Bernstein and Montealegre played by Cooper and Carey Mulligan. Peck oversaw the Fancy Free section of the scene and then devise original choreography for the On the Town music. Together, Cooper explains, they worked on “the best choreography to tell the story of, they are going to be pulled apart in this life, everybody’s going to be around them, there are going to be hands and eyes on them, and then they are going to try to find each other."

In 2023 Peck adapted a musical production of Sufjan Stevens' 2005 concept album Illinois titled Illinoise, alongside playwright Jackie Sibblies Drury. The production had its debut at the Fisher Center at Bard before playing at the Chicago Shakespeare Theatre. The production then ran at the Park Avenue Armory in New York City. The production "weave[s] together delicate folk narratives about blossoming queerness, orchestral anthems destined for cinematic montages, and jazz tunes about the state’s ghost towns". Peck said he drew inspiration from the 1975 musical A Chorus Line saying, "It’s about this group of humans, and one by one we’re getting their stories...Some of them are short, single songs. Some of them are a little more extensive. Some of them build and build and build, and relationships form...I think there’s a parallel to that structure with the show we’re doing here". For Illinoise, Peck won his second Tony Award for Best Choreography.

Peck teamed with his wife Patricia Delgado to choreograph the musical Buena Vista Social Club, for which they won the Lucille Lortel Award for Outstanding Choreographer and were nominated for an Outer Critics Circle Award for Outstanding Choreography.

His most recent work for New York City Ballet was Mystic Familiar, which premiered in January 2025. The piece was both criticized and lauded for its similarity to Peck's 2017 ballet The Times Are Racing, which also used sneakers and Dan Deacon's music as the score.

== Personal life ==
Peck is married to former Miami City Ballet principal dancer Patricia Delgado. They welcomed their daughter in March 2021.

== Selected works ==
=== Ballet ===
- In Creases (2012) – New York City Ballet
- Year of the Rabbit (2012) – New York City Ballet
- Paz de la Jolla (2013) – New York City Ballet
- Chutes and Ladders (2013) – Miami City Ballet
- Capricious Maneuvers (2013) – New York City Ballet
- Murder Ballades (2013) – LA Dance Project
- Everywhere We Go (2014) – New York City Ballet
- Belles-Lettres (2014) – New York City Ballet
- Debonair (2014) – Pacific Northwest Ballet
- Helix (2014) – LA Dance Project
- Rodeo: Four Dance Episodes (2015) – New York City Ballet
- Heatscape (2015) – Miami City Ballet
- New Blood (2015) – New York City Ballet
- The Most Incredible Thing (2016) – New York City Ballet
- In the Countenance of Kings (2016) – San Francisco Ballet
- Entre chien et loup (2016) – Paris Opera Ballet
- Scherzo Fantastique (2016) – New York City Ballet
- The Dreamers (2016) – New York City Ballet
- The Times Are Racing (2017) – New York City Ballet
- The Decalogue (2017) – New York City Ballet
- Pulcinella Variations (2017) – New York City Ballet
- Hurry Up, We're Dreaming (2018) – San Francisco Ballet
- Easy (2018) – New York City Ballet
- Principia (2019) – New York City Ballet
- Reflections (2019) – Houston Ballet
- Bright (2019) – New York City Ballet
- Rotunda (2020) – New York City Ballet
- Partita (2022) – New York City Ballet
- Solo (2022) – New York City Ballet
- Copland Dance Episodes (2023) – New York City Ballet
- Under the Folding Sky (2023) – Houston Ballet
- Dig the Say (2024) – New York City Ballet
- Mystic Familiar (2025) - New York City Ballet

=== Theatre ===
- Carousel (2018) – Imperial Theatre, Broadway
- Buena Vista Social Club (2023/2025) – Off-Broadway / Broadway
- Illinoise (2024)

=== Film ===
- Red Sparrow (2017) – dir. Francis Lawrence – Choreographer
- West Side Story (2021) – dir. Steven Spielberg – Choreographer
- Maestro (2023) – dir. Bradley Cooper – Choreographer
- Ray Gunn (2026) – dir. Brad Bird – Actor

== Awards and nominations ==
Year	Award	Category	Project	Result	Ref.
2013	Benois De La Danse		Year of the Rabbit	Nominated	
2015	Bessie Awards	Outstanding Production	Rodeo: Four Dance Episodes	Won	
2018	Tony Awards	Best Choreography	Carousel	Won	
2018	Drama Desk Awards	Outstanding Choreography	Carousel	Won	
2018	Outer Critics Circle Awards	Outstanding Choreography (Broadway or Off-Broadway)	Carousel	Won	
2024	Tony Awards	Best Choreography	Illinoise	Won	
2024	Drama Desk Awards	Outstanding Choreography	Illinoise	Won	
2024	Drama League Awards	Outstanding Production of a Musical	Illinoise	Nominated	
2024	Outer Critics Circle Awards	Outstanding Choreography (Broadway or Off-Broadway)	Illinoise	Won	
2024	Lucille Lortel Awards	Outstanding Choreographer (Off-Broadway)	Buena Vista Social Club	Won	
2024	Outer Critics Circle Awards	Outstanding Choreography (Broadway or Off-Broadway)	Buena Vista Social Club	Nominated	
2025	Tony Awards	Best Choreography	Buena Vista Social Club	Won	
2025	Chita Rivera Award	Outstanding Choreography in a Broadway Show	Buena Vista Social Club	Won	

Peck has been honored with the:

- 2018: National Arts Awards Ted Arison Young Arts Award
- 2019: American Academy of Achievement Golden Plate.

New York City Ballet
Preceded by Christopher Wheeldon	Resident Choreographer; 2014–present	Succeeded by Current holder
