= Sarah-Gabrielle Ryan =

Mexican-American ballet dancer

- Born: 15 August 1997 (age 28); Philadelphia, Pennsylvania, U.S.
- Citizenship: American/Irish
- Occupation: Ballet Dancer
- Years active: 2014-present
- Career
- Current group: Pacific Northwest Ballet
- Former groups: Philadelphia Ballet

Sarah-Gabrielle Ryan is a Mexican-American ballet dancer who is currently a principal dancer with Pacific Northwest Ballet in Seattle.

== Early life and training ==
Ryan was born in Philadelphia, Pennsylvania, to a Mexican mother and an Irish-American father. She began dance classes at a local studio before one of her teachers noticed her natural facility for classical ballet and recommended The Rock School for Dance Education for more specialized and technical training.

Ryan also attended classes at Metropolitan Ballet Academy, and eventually enrolled at the newly reopened School of Pennsylvania Ballet, from where she graduated.

She attended various summer courses at institutions such as the Bolshoi Ballet Academy, Ellison Ballet, San Francisco Ballet, School of American Ballet, the School of Pennsylvania Ballet, and Pacific Northwest Ballet School.

== Career ==
At 16, Ryan received her first professional contract with the company formerly known as Pennsylvania Ballet (now Philadelphia Ballet). Two years later, in 2016, she joined Pacific Northwest Ballet as an apprentice, and was promoted to corps de ballet in 2017.

During her first year in the corps de ballet, she was chosen to replace principal ballerina Noelani Pantastico (who was injured at the time) in Crystal Pite's Plot Point. Her successful performance led to a string of featured roles, including Maria in Jerome Robbin's West Side Story and the Sugar Plum Fairy in George Balanchine's The Nutcracker.

In 2018 she was featured in Dance Magazine's "On the Rise" and was the March/April (digital) cover of Pointe Magazine in 2021.

During the pandemic lockdown, when live performances were canceled, Ryan was featured in Sylvia Pas de deux and the Rubies pas de deux from Balanchine's Jewels for PNB's digital season.

She was promoted to Soloist at Pacific Northwest Ballet in November 2021, and to Principal dancer in November 2023.

Most recently, Ryan danced leading roles during PNB's June 2022 tour in New York City. She was featured in the playbill and poster at the David H. Koch Theater.

Outside of PNB, Ryan has performed as a guest artist at Shut Up & Dance in collaboration with MANNA, Chop Shop Contemporary Dance Festival, and the Seattle International Dance Festival. In 2021, she was a guest artist for Matthew Neenan's residency at the Annenberg Center for the Performing Arts, South Dakota Ballet, and Ballet Sun Valley dance festival in Idaho.

Ryan is artistic co-director of Green Bay Ballet Festival, along with fellow PNB Principal dancer, Kyle Davis.

In addition to her work as a dancer, Ryan choreographed Before You Know It for PNB's Next Step program.

== Selected Repertoire ==
- Agon
- Allegro Brillante
- Cinderella (Prokofiev) (Cinderella, Spring)
- Coppélia (Swanilda, Waltz of the Golden Hours)
- Giselle (Giselle, Peasant pas de deux)
- Jewels (Emerald, Ruby)
- A Midsummer Night's Dream (Butterfly, Hermia)
- The Nutcracker (Sugar Plum Fairy, Columbine, Marzipan, Dewdrop, Hot Chocolate, Coffee)
- Petite Mort
- The Sleeping Beauty (Princess Aurora, Fairy Candide, Fairy of Temperament, Blue Bird pas de deux)
- The Season's Canon
- Swan Lake (Pas de trois, Czardas, Neapolitan Dance)
- Tarantella
- The Times Are Racing
- West Side Story Suite (Maria)

=== Created roles ===
- Donald Byrd: Love and Loss
- Kyle Davis: A Dark and Lonely Space
- Amanda Morgan: This Space is Left Intentionally Blank
- Matthew Neenan: Bacchus
- Noelani Pantastico: Picnic
- Miles Pertl: Wash of Gray
- Eva Stone: F O I L
- Ezra Thompson: The Perpetual State
