= Generosa =

Generosa may refer to:

- Generosa, settlement in the Lembá District in the western part of São Tomé Island in São Tomé and Príncipe
- Generosa Aguilar, Argentine politician
- Angelica Generosa (born 1993 or 1994), American ballet dancer
- Catacombs of Generosa, catacomb of Rome (Italy)
