= Carla Körbes =

Brazilian ballet dancer

- Born: 1980 or 1981 (age 44–45); Porto Alegre, Brazil
- Education: School of American Ballet
- Occupation: ballet dancer
- Spouse: Patrick Fraser (m. 2015)
- Children: 2
- Career
- Current group: Indiana University Jacobs School of Music
- Former groups: New York City Ballet; Pacific Northwest Ballet; L.A. Dance Project

Carla Körbes is a Brazilian ballet dancer who performed as a principal dancer with the Pacific Northwest Ballet, then became the associate artistic director of L.A Dance Project. She is now an associate professor at Indiana University Jacobs School of Music's ballet faculty.

== Early life and training ==
Körbes was born in Porto Alegre, Brazil. She started ballet at age 5 and entered the Ballet Vera Bublitz school at age 11. At age 14, she danced Terpsichore in Apollo, partnering Peter Boal, then a New York City Ballet principal dancer and a guest at the school. After that, Boal recommended her to train at the School of American Ballet in New York City, even though she did not speak English at the time. Alexandra Danilova provided a year of Körbes' tuition. She received the Mae L. Wien Awards for Outstanding Promise in 1999.

== Career ==
Körbes became an apprentice the New York City Ballet in 1999, and joined the company as a full-time corps de ballet member the following year. She received the Janice Levin Dancer Award in the 2001-02 season. She was named soloist in 2005. Later that year, she joined the Pacific Northwest Ballet in Seattle, when Boal became the artistic director of PNB. She made her company debut as a demi-soloist in Symphony in Three Movements. The following year, she was promoted to principal dancer. Her repertoire include full-length classics such as Swan Lake and Giselle, as well as George Balanchine's works and contemporary works. She was coached by Mimi Paul and Violette Verdy. In 2012, she danced the first revival of George Balanchine's Élégie in since its premiere, at the Vail International Dance Festival.

Körbes was named one of "25 to Watch" by Dance Magazine in 2006. Alastair Macaulay, dance critic of The New York Times, has repeatedly singled out her performances for praise. In 2010, during a nationwide tour of the Nutcracker season, he stated that Körbes was the best dancer he had seen of the tour, and in 2012, in a review of the Vail International Dance Festival, he stated that Körbes "is one of the finest ballerinas appearing in America today; some think her the finest, and last weekend I felt in no mood to contradict them."

In 2014, at age 33, Körbes announced she would leave PNB in June 2015, as "her body needs something different" following a knee surgery. Per PNB tradition, her final performance was a program for departing dancers, which she danced Jessica Lang's The Calling, Balanchine's Serenade and "Diamonds" from Jewels.

In 2015, Körbes was named an artist in residence at the Vail International Dance Festival. Later that year, she became the associate artistic director of L.A. Dance Project, which was directed by Benjamin Millepied. She also taught at the Colburn School in Los Angeles. She occasionally performs at festivals and galas.

In 2017 she joined the Indiana University Jacobs School of Music ballet faculty as an associate professor.

== Personal life ==
In April 2015 she married British photographer Patrick Fraser and later that year gave birth to a baby boy named Rafael.

== Selected repertoire ==
Körbes' repertoire with the New York City Ballet and Pacific Northwest Ballet includes:

- After the Rain pas de deux
- Agon
- Apollo
- Carousel (A Dance)
- Cinderella (Cinderella)
- Concerto Barocco
- Concerto DSCH
- Coppélia (Swanilda)
- Élégie
- Fancy Free
- The Four Seasons
- Giselle (Giselle)
- Glass Pieces
- In the Middle, Somewhat Elevated
- In the Night
- "Diamonds" and "Emeralds" from Jewels
- A Midsummer Night's Dream (Titania, Helena, Divertissement pas de deux)
- The Nutcracker (Clara, Flora, Peacock)
- Polyphonia
- Roméo et Juliette (Juliet)
- Serenade
- The Sleeping Beauty (Aurora, Gold and Silver pas de trois, Lilac Fairy)
- Swan Lake (Odette/Odile)
- Symphony in Three Movements
- La Valse
- West Side Story Suite (Anita)

=== Created roles ===
- 3 Movements
- An American in Paris
- Chichester Psalms
- Double Feature
- Opus 111
- Sense of Doubt
- Soiree
- Shambards
- Tide Harmonic
- Haiku
