= Ashton Edwards =

American ballet dancer

Ashton Edwards (born 2002 or 2003) is an American ballet dancer with the Pacific Northwest Ballet. Edwards is non-binary, and has trained in and performs both male and female ballet roles.

== Life ==
Edwards is from Flint, Michigan, where they grew up as the sixth of seven children in an African-American family. They first became interested in ballet after seeing a local production of The Nutcracker at age three. They attended the Flint School of Performing Arts, and studied ballet during summer courses at Joffrey Ballet Chicago, Houston Ballet, and Pacific Northwest Ballet. Edwards was often one of only a few Black students in their ballet classes, which they have said drove them to excel.

== Career ==
Edwards was accepted into Pacific Northwest Ballet's Professional Division training program, where they continued to train until the COVID-19 pandemic forced the school to temporarily close in early 2020. During the spring and summer of 2020, Edwards undertook self-directed training to learn pointe, having until that time only been trained in men's ballet styles. When training resumed in-person in the fall, artistic director Peter Boal agreed to allow Edwards to take the professional pointe classes. In December 2020, Edwards danced en pointe with Ballet22, a gender and sexuality-inclusive dance company created by Roberto Vega Ortiz and Theresa Knudson.

In November 2021, Edwards became an apprentice at Pacific Northwest Ballet, joining the corps de ballet the following year. During their first traditionally female role, the snow and flower corps de ballet in The Nutcracker in 2021, the other ensemble ballerinas "embraced Edwards — and offered them a crash course in the tips and tricks of ballerina-dom".

Alongside their work with Pacific Northwest Ballet, Edwards has remained involved with Ballet22.

In February 2024, Edwards performed a pas de deux in The Times Are Racing at New York City Ballet with another non-binary ballet dancer, Taylor Stanley. Gia Kourlas, of The New York Times, noted that "their performance glowed, and not just because it was newsworthy...what mattered more was the energy between their physical forms; the warmth they radiated even at a distance; and their phrasing, which was so fluid that at times they seemed less two bodies than one". She noted of Edwards specifically, "Edwards...is all radiance. While small, Edwards moves with big scale and ever-growing extension; there is no hesitation, only constant attention to detail".

In December 2024, Edwards was a guest performer at the Flint School of Performing Arts's production of The Nutcracker, where they performed as the Sugar Plum Fairy.

Peter Boal has credited Edwards with sparking internal review at Pacific Northwest Ballet regarding gendered classes and roles at the company. Dance Magazine said of Edwards' dancing in 2022, "what makes [Edwards] an unforgettable performer isn’t their meticulous technique, musicality and apparently effortless physicality—it’s joy, pure and simple".

=== Repertoire ===
- A Midsummer Night's Dream - Puck
- The Nutcracker - Sugar Plum Fairy, Dewdrop, Snow corps, Flowers corps
- Petite Mort (Jiří Kylián)
- Quick Pleasures (Kiyon Ross)
- Swan Lake - Swan corps de ballet, Little swans
- The Times Are Racing (Justin Peck)

== Personal life ==
Edwards is non-binary, using they/them pronouns, and is queer. They previously identified as a gay man.

== Awards and recognition ==
- 2021 Princess Grace Award
- 2023 "25 to Watch", Dance Magazine
