= Mt. Joy (restaurant) =

Restaurant chain based in Seattle, Washington, U.S.

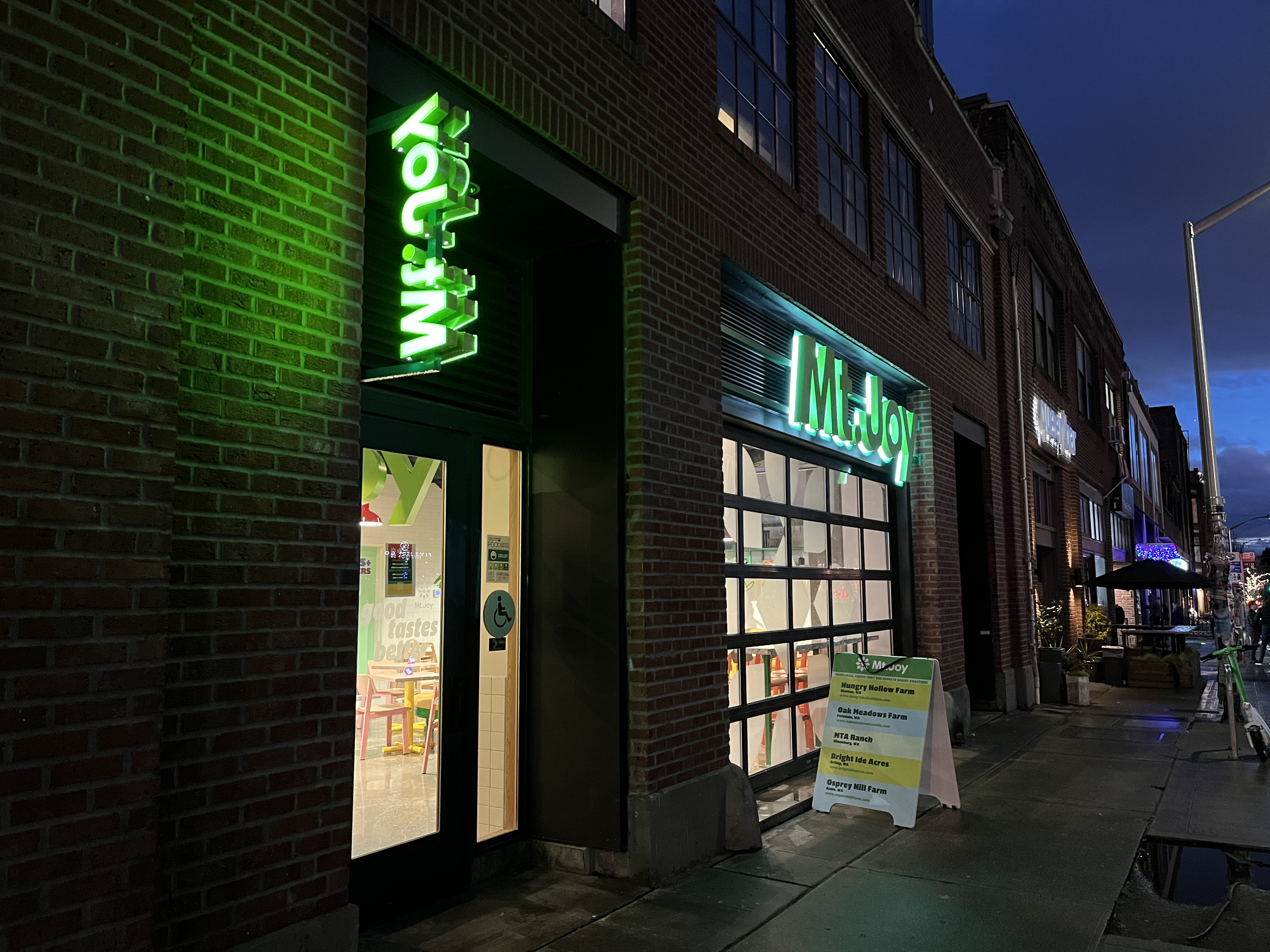
- Exterior of the original restaurant on Seattle's Capitol Hill at night, December 2023
- Interactive map of Mt. Joy

Restaurant information
- Established: 2023
- Owners: Robbie Cape; Grant Jones; Justin Kaufman; Pat Snavely; Ethan Stowell
- Location: 1530 11th Avenue, Seattle, King, Washington, 98122, United States
- Coordinates: 47.6150°N 122.3179°W
- Website: mtjoy.com

Mt. Joy was a restaurant chain specializing in chicken sandwiches, based in Seattle, Washington. The business opened a food truck on Capitol Hill in September 2023, followed by a brick-and-mortar restaurant on December 1. Ethan Stowell was among the co-owners of Mt. Joy, which specialized in fried chicken sandwiches. The restaurant closed permanently in 2026. The business was conceived by Robbie Cape after he watched the documentary Kiss the Ground and was inspired by regenerative agriculture.

== Description ==
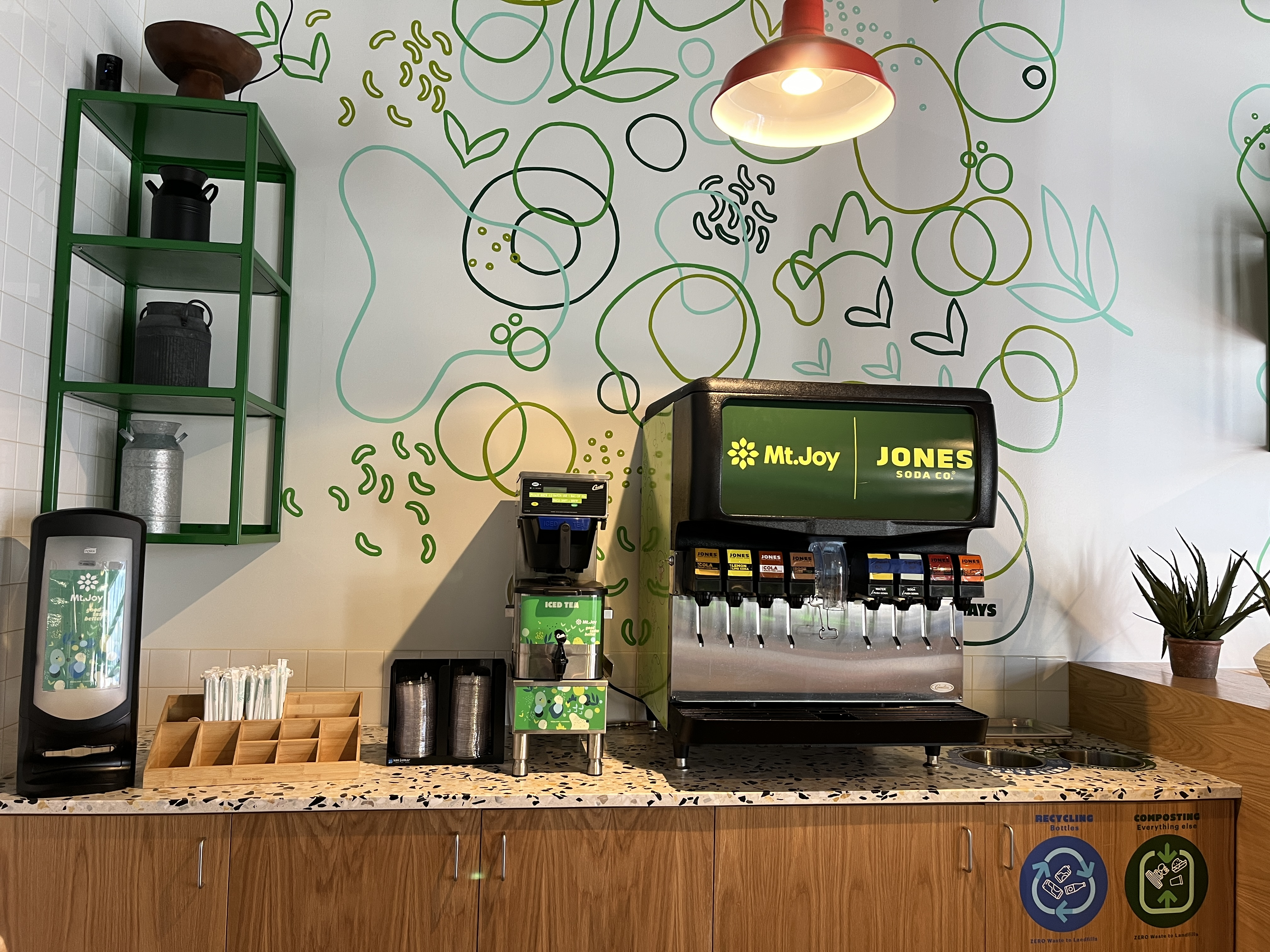
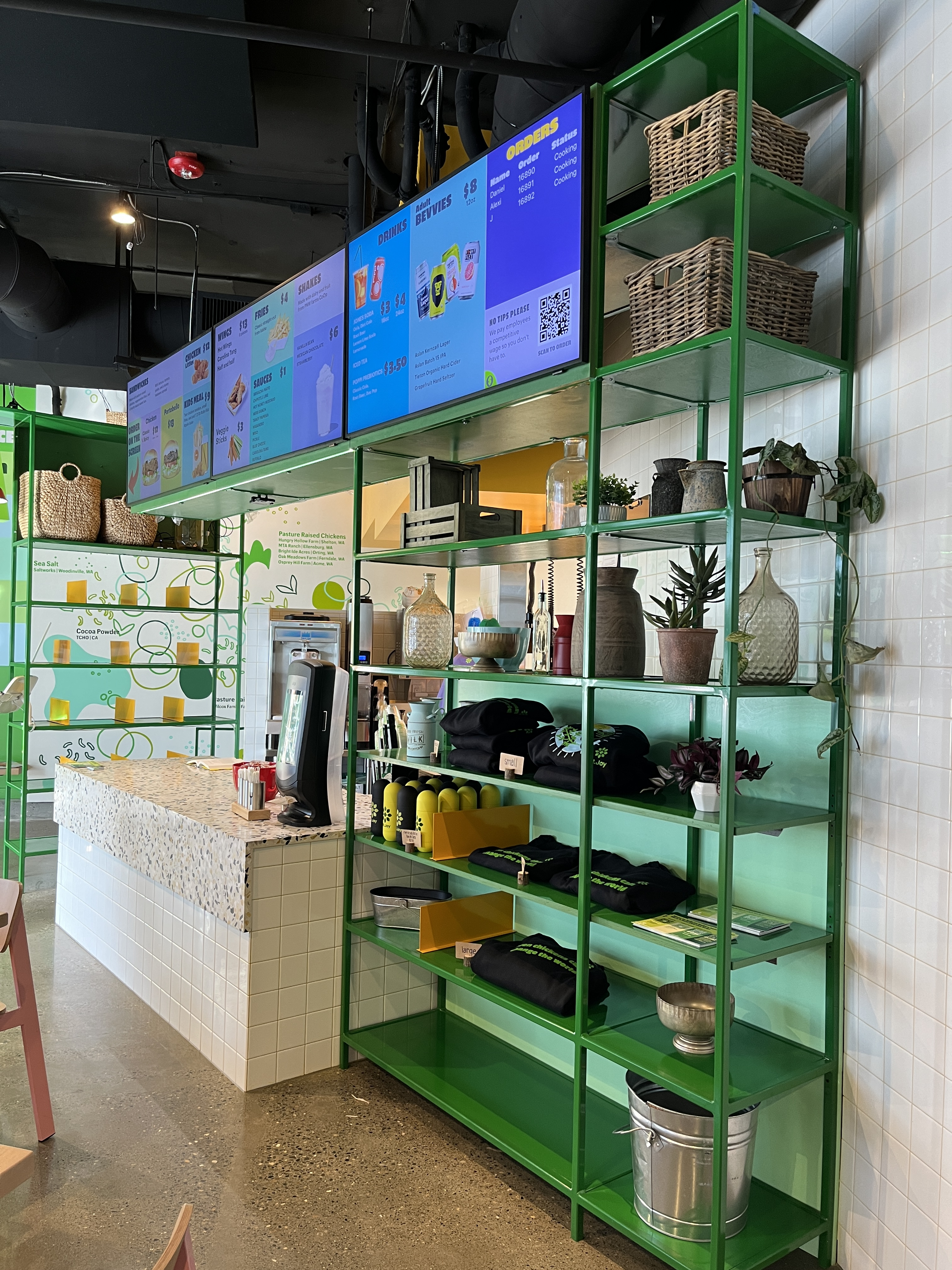
The restaurant's interior, 2024

Mt. Joy was described as a fast-casual restaurant chain specializing in chicken sandwiches that "focuses on pasture-raised chickens sourced from local farms who have an environmentally-friendly focus", according to The Seattle Times. The magazine Seattle Metropolitan said the sandwiches "double as a means to overhaul agricultural processes that contribute to climate change". Mt. Joy billed itself as the "first ever regenerative-focused" restaurant in the Pacific Northwest.

The business operated a brick-and-mortar restaurant on Seattle's Capitol Hill, as well as a food truck. The restaurant's interior had shades of green and white. Spicy or mild versions of fried chicken sandwiches had breasts or thighs, as well as lettuce, tomato, and a house sauce on a brioche bun. Mt. Joy also served a portobello sandwich. The menu also included chicken tenders, milkshakes, and French fries with five dipping sauces made in-house. Mt. Joy sourced ingredients locally and served beer. The custom buns were made by Franz Bakery.

== History ==
=== Conception and development ===
Robbie Cape conceived of the business after watching Kiss the Ground, a 2020 documentary film about regenerative agriculture; he recruited regenerative farmer Grant Jones to co-found the restaurant, and also brought on chef and restaurateur Ethan Stowell to be a partner.

In October 2022, The Seattle Times reported that owners hoped to open the first restaurant in Seattle by the Fall 2023, with additional locations planned throughout the Pacific Northwest. Mt. Joy's three-day pop-up and fried chicken sandwich test run was held at the Capitol Hill location of Stowell's Italian restaurant Tavolàta in October 2022. The chickens were supplied by Hungry Hollow, Jones's family farm in Shelton, Washington. During the pop-up, Mt. Joy also served the portobello sandwich, fries, and three varieties of milkshakes (chocolate, huckleberry, and vanilla). Mt. Joy had another three-day pop-up at Stowell's restaurant Rione XIII in May 2023.

=== Food truck and brick-and-mortar restaurants ===
In September 2023, Mt. Joy launched a food truck on East Olive Way, in the parking lot of a former Starbucks shop. According to GeekWire, Mt. Joy had fifteen employees at the time. Mt. Joy also announced plans to open a brick-and-mortar restaurant on Capitol Hill, on the ground level of the Sunset Electric apartment building near the intersection of 11th and Pine Street.

The restaurant opened on December 1, 2023, with a reported $1.5 million in funding from multiple investors. Harry Cheadle of Eater Seattle noted how Mt. Joy opened in close proximity to multiple fried chicken eateries, and even launched the same week as a Dave's Hot Chicken restaurant. In addition to Hungry Hollow, four other farms in Western Washington have supplied chickens to Mt. Joy, as of late 2023. According to Eater Seattle, the owners hope to expand to thousands of locations.

In 2024, a second 900-square-foot brick and mortar location opened in South Lake Union.

Conscious Hospitality co-founder Daniel Brawer acquired the business in June 2025. Both Seattle locations closed in March 2026.

=== Leadership ===
Cape was the chief executive officer. Pat Snavely was another founding partner as well as chief marketing officer. Justin Kaufman was a co-founder as well as Mt. Joy's chief technology officer. Dionne Himmelfarb, who was previously a chef for Stowell, was the chief culinary officer. Jones was the chief agricultural officer.

== Reception ==
George Burquest of Seattle University's student publication The Spectator gave the white meat chicken sandwich a rating of 7 out of 10 and wrote, "All in all, Mt. Joy was a very pleasant experience, but nothing to write home about. The sandwich looked like a dictionary definition ... and the flavors were by book as well."

== See also ==
- Chicken sandwich wars
- Fried chicken restaurant
- List of chicken restaurants
- List of defunct restaurants of the United States
- List of food trucks
