= Chalnessa Eames =

Ballet dancer

- Born: 1978 (age 46–47); Los Angeles, California
- Occupation: Ballet dancer
- Career
- Current group: Whim W'Him
- Former groups: Royal Winnipeg Ballet (1998-2001); Pacific Northwest Ballet (2001-2011)

Chalnessa Eames (born 1978) is a ballet dancer who performed with the Royal Winnipeg Ballet and the Pacific Northwest Ballet.

== Early life and education ==
Eames was born in Los Angeles, California. She is one of five children born to Rebecca (Becky) and David Eames. From the age of three, she grew up in Bellingham, Washington, where she studied ballet at the Nancy Whyte School of Ballet and the Morca Academy of Performing Arts. She then moved to Eugene (Oregon) to work with Kathleen Smith Epstein, who taught using the Vaganova syllabus. She worked with her for two years, from ages 12–14, when she started high school.

She auditioned for Harid Conservatory and received a two-year scholarship. She attended summer programs at the Pacific Northwest Ballet School and the School of Royal Winnipeg Ballet, and completed her final year of training at Winnipeg.

== Career ==
In 1996, at the age of 18, she joined Royal Winnipeg Ballet, as an apprentice and was promoted to the corps de ballet the following year. She joined the Pacific Northwest Ballet as a member of the corps de ballet in 2001, where she was promoted to soloist in 2007. Eames left the Pacific Northwest Ballet in June 2011. She currently performs with Olivier Wevers' Whim W'Him dance company.

=== Leading roles ===
Eames has danced leading roles which include:

- George Balanchine's Agon, Coppélia, Emeralds, The Four Temperaments, A Midsummer Night's Dream (Butterfly), Rubies, Serenade, and Symphony in C
- Todd Bolender's Souvenirs
- Ulysses Dove's Dancing on the Front Porch of Heaven, Serious Pleasures, and Vespers
- Nacho Duato's Jardí Tancat and Rassemblement
- William Forsythe's Artifact II and One Flat Thing, reproduced
- Ronald Hynd's The Sleeping Beauty (Bluebird pas de deux, Gold and Silver pas de trois)
- Jiri Kylian's Petite Mort
- José Limón's The Moor's Pavane
- Jean-Christophe Maillot's Roméo et Juliette (Nurse)
- Jerome Robbins' Dances at a Gathering and Fancy Free
- Kent Stowell's Cinderella (Stepsister), Delicate Balance, Nutcracker (Clara, Flora), Quaternary, and Silver Lining
- Twyla Tharp's Afternoon Ball, In the Upper Room, and Nine Sinatra Songs
- Christopher Wheeldon's Variations Sérieuses

She also originated the leading roles in:

- Benjamin Millepied's 3 Movements
- Susan Stroman's TAKE FIVE ... More or Less
- Twyla Tharp's Opus 111
- Olivier Wevers' Shindig

=== Other work ===
Eames danced in Guy Maddin's 2002 film Dracula: Pages from a Virgin's Diary.

== Personal life ==
Eames is married to Ash Modha, the CEO and co-founder of the Mondetta Clothing Company.
