= Rubinstein Bagels =

Bagel company based in Washington, US

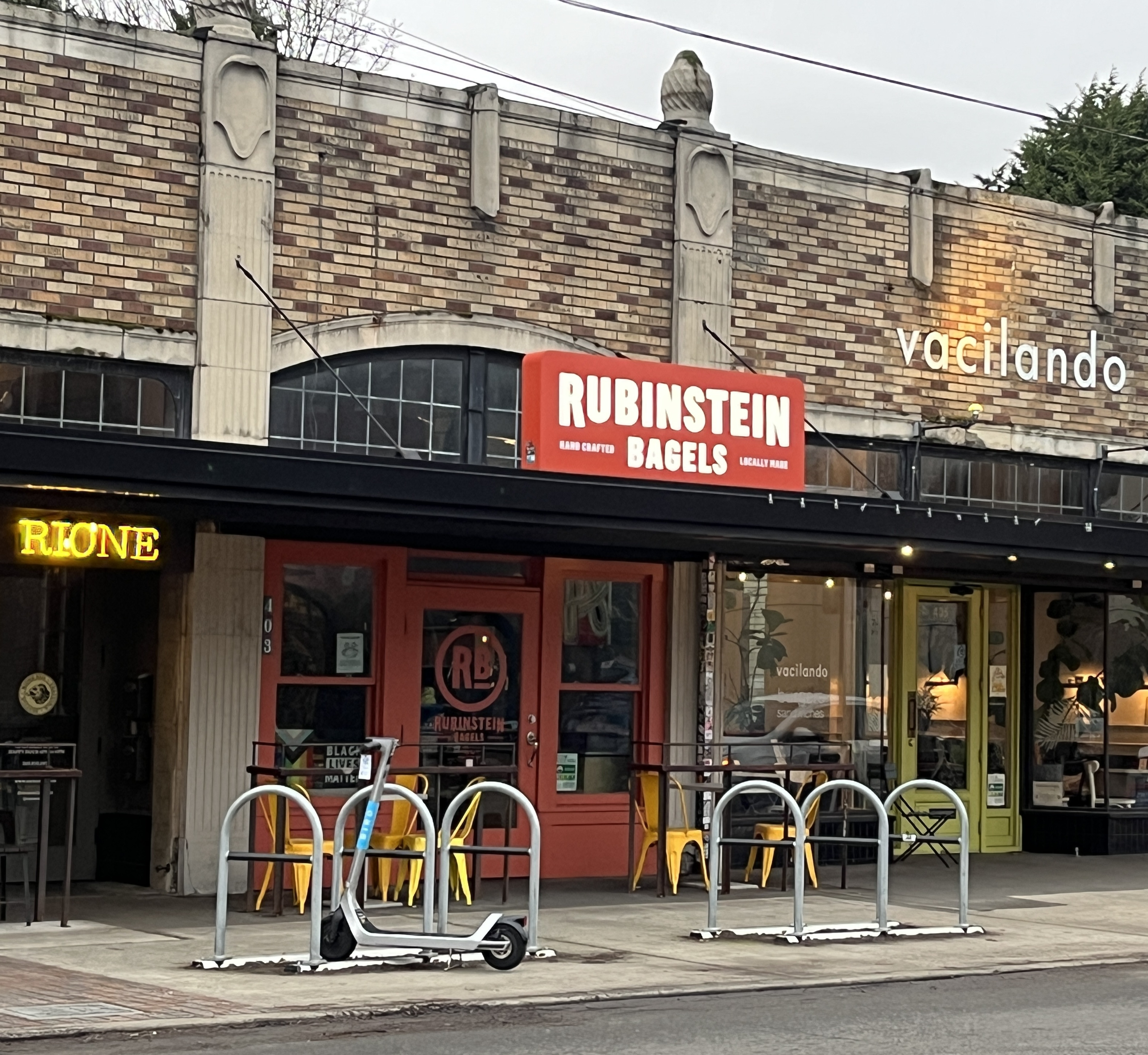
- Exterior of the shop on Capitol Hill, 2023
- Interactive map of Rubinstein Bagels

Restaurant information
- Owner: Ethan Stowell
- Previous owner: Andrew Rubinstein
- Location: Seattle, King, Washington, United States
- Coordinates: 47.6151°N 122.3402°W
- Website: rubinsteinbagels.com

Rubinstein Bagels is a bagel brand with three locations in the Seattle metropolitan area, in the U.S. state of Washington, owned by Ethan Stowell's restaurants. In Seattle, the business operates in South Lake Union and on Capitol Hill; since 2023, a third location has operated in Redmond.

Rubinstein was established by Andrew Rubinstein, who initially sold bagels out of Cortina Cafe as well as Two Union Square's second floor lobby. He opened the South Lake Union and Capitol Hill locations before selling his interest in the business to Ethan Stowell and focusing on a new Bagel venture, Hey Bagel.

Rubinstein has garnered a positive reception. Food & Wine has featured the bagels.

== Description ==
When the original shop opened, Rubinstein offered 12 sourdough bagel varieties, including jalapeño white cheddar, salted rosemary, shallot, cacio e pepe, and chocolate and cherry. Various schmears are also available, and the menu has also included egg breakfast sandwiches, salads, and duck fat matzo ball soup.

== History ==
The business was founded by Andrew Rubinstein, who initially sold bagels at Cortina Cafe, owned by Ethan Stowell Restaurants. The company then opened stand-alone bagel stores in South Lake Union, followed by Capitol Hill neighborhoods of Seattle. His tagline was, "These are the bagels you've been looking for." Andrew Rubinstein sold his remaining interest in the bagel brand to Ethan Stowell restaurants, operators of several other chains of restaurants in the Pacific Northwest.

Andrew Rubinstein also sold bagels in Two Union Square's second floor lobby before founding stand-alone stores. The business' first brick and mortar location opened in the Via6 Towers in the Denny Triangle/South Lake Union area in December 2020. The business has been part of a South Lake Union food tour.

A second location has operated on Capitol Hill since October 15, 2021, in the space previously occupied by the Wandering Goose. In January 2022, The Seattle Times said Rubinstein "[seemed] bent on world domination", with plans to add more locations.

Following a delay, a third location began operating in Redmond in 2023. The 2,680 square-foot space in Redmond operates in GGLO-designed Porch + Park building, and opens onto Downtown Park.

== Reception ==
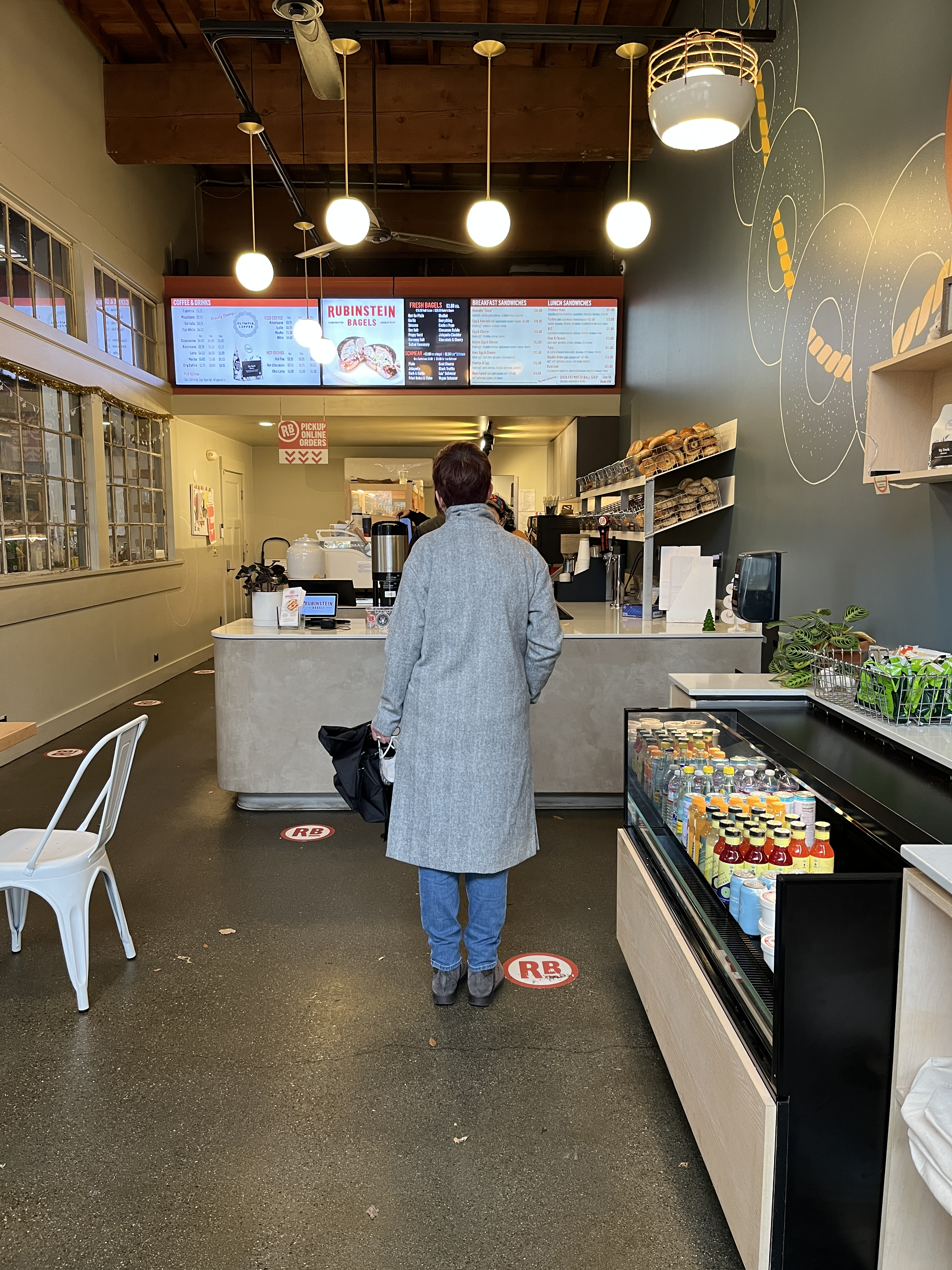
Interior of the Capitol Hill location, 2022

The Seattle Times said, "the brand new Rubinstein Bagels just might be the best thing since sliced bread", and Christina Ausley included the business in the Seattle Post-Intelligencer's 2020 overview of the city's best bagel shops. Seattle's Child magazine said in 2020, "Rubinstein Bagels has gained a following for great texture, innovative yet classic accompaniments (shallots, anyone? Fried onion and chive cream cheese?) and a trendy twist – sourdough starter." In 2021, David Landsel included Rubinstein in Food & Wine's overview of the best bagels in the United States.

The matzo ball soup was included in 2021 overviews of comforting soups published by Eater Seattle and The Seattle Times. The website also included the breakfast sandwiches in a guide of the city's best. Alana Al-Hatlani included Rubinstein in Eater Seattle's 2022 list of 10 "sensational" bagel shops in the metropolitan area. KNKX food commentator Nancy Leson praised the bagel sandwich in 2022. Rubinstein is a favorite local bagel establishment of chef and food writer J. Kenji López-Alt.

== See also ==
- List of Ashkenazi Jewish restaurants
- List of bakeries
- List of restaurant chains in the United States
