= Noelani Pantastico =

American ballet dancer

- Born: Oahu, Hawaii, U.S.
- Occupation: ballet dancer
- Years active: 1997-present
- Dancing career
- Current group: Central Pennsylvania Youth Ballet (CPYB)
- Former groups: Pacific Northwest Ballet; Les Ballets de Monte-Carlo

Noelani Pantastico (born May 4, 1980) is an American ballet dancer. She was formerly a principal dancer with Pacific Northwest Ballet in Seattle and also danced at the Les Ballets de Monte-Carlo in Monaco.

== Early life ==
Pantastico was born in Oahu, Hawaii, to a Hawaiian-Filipino father and an Australian mother, and is one of six children. In her early life, her family moved around in the country. She started training at the Central Pennsylvania Youth Ballet (CPYB) at the age of 11, under director Marcia Dale Weary. She also attended Pacific Northwest Ballet's summer intensives for three years

== Career ==
In 1997, Pantastico joined the Pacific Northwest Ballet in Seattle as an apprentice, and became a member of the corps de ballet a year later. She was named soloist in 2001 and, a year after dancing Aurora in Sleeping Beauty, a principal in 2004.

In 2008, she left PNB and joined Jean-Christophe Maillot's Les Ballets de Monte-Carlo in Monaco as a soloist, having previously danced Maillot's Roméo et Juliette at PNB. She was named first soloist a year later.

In 2015, she returned to PNB, again as a principal dancer. During her time in PNB, she has danced in Jewels, Cendrillon, The Nutcracker, Giselle, Crystal Pite's Plot Point and Penny Saunders's ALICE. She was also featured in the 1999 filmed version of PNB's A Midsummer Night's Dream.

In 2017, Pantastico choreographed Picnic for Sculptured Dance.

Outside of PNB, in 2004, she made a guest appearance at the New York City Ballet, dancing the second movement of Balanchine's Brahms–Schoenberg Quartet at NYCB's Balanchine Centennial. She also founded Seattle Dance Collective with fellow PNB principal dancer James Moore.

In January 2022, Pantastico announced her retirement from performing. She subsequently joined the faculty of CPYB, and as of 2023 was their artistic director.

== Selected repertoire ==
- Agon
- Apollo
- Brahms-Schoenberg Quartet
- Carmen
- Cendrillon (Cinderella, Fairy/Mother)
- Concerto Barocco
- Cinderella (Cinderella)
- Coppélia (Swanilda, Spinner)
- Dances at a Gathering
- The Firebird
- "Emerald", "Rubies" and "Diamond" from Jewels
- The Merry Widow (Valencienne)
- A Midsummer Night's Dream (Divertissement pas de deux, Hermia)
- The Nutcracker (Sugar Plum Fairy, Coffee, Marzipan, Dewdrop)
- Other Dances
- Paquita
- Petite Mort
- Roméo et Juliette (Juliet)
- Scheherazade
- Serenade
- The Sleeping Beauty (Princess Aurora, Queen)
- La Source
- Swan Lake (Odette/Odile)
- Symphony in C
- Theme and Variations
- The Tragedy of Romeo and Juliet (Juliet)
- La Valse
- West Side Story Suite (Anita)
- Year of the Rabbit

=== Created roles ===
- Kyle Davis: A Dark and Lonely Space
- Dominique Dumais: Time and other Matter
- Paul Gibson: The Piano Dance, Sense of Doubt
- Jean-Christophe Maillot: Casse-Noisette Compagnie, Lac
- Miles Pertl: Wash of Gray
- Victor Quijada: Suspension of Disbelief
- Eva Stone: F O I L
- Christopher Stowell: Quick Time, Zaïs
- Kent Stowell: Dual Lish
- Susan Stroman: TAKE FIVE…More or Less
- Christopher Wheeldon: The Trees The Trees

== Awards ==
- 1996 Regional Dance America/Northeast Scholarship winner
- 1997 Regional Dance America/Northeast Scholarship winner
