= Miranda Weese =

American ballet dancer and ballet master (born 1973 or 1974)

- Born: 1973 or 1974 (age 52–53); San Bernardino, California, US
- Education: School of American Ballet
- Occupations: ballet dancer; teacher; ballet master
- Career
- Current group: Boston Ballet
- Former groups: New York City Ballet; Pacific Northwest Ballet

Miranda Weese (born 1973 or 1974) is an American former ballet dancer, teacher and ballet master. She joined the New York City Ballet in 1993 and was promoted to principal dancer in 1996. In 2007, she left to perform with the Pacific Northwest Ballet, first as a guest artist, then joined the company as a principal dancer, before retiring in 2010. In 2017, she joined the Boston Ballet as a children's ballet master.

== Early life and training ==
Weese was born in San Bernardino, California. She started living with her maternal grandparents as an infant, and was adopted by them as a child. Weese refers to the couple as her parents. She was raised primarily in Orange County, but had also lived in La Puente for a few years.

Weese started dancing at age five, after a doctor recommended it to help her with knock knees and otherwise bad health. She later trained with Catherine Joyce while living in La Puente, then with Shery Gilbert upon returning to Orange County, becoming Gilbert's first student. In 1990, at age fifteen, she attended a summer intensive at the School of American Ballet, and was offered a place full-time.

== Career ==
In 1991, months after Weese started training at the School of American Ballet, she became an apprentice with the New York City Ballet. The following year, she broke her foot, which forced her to stop performing for five months. Following her return, she started watching videotapes of both herself and other dancers to help her progress. In 1993, she joined the corps de ballet. Her first featured role was in Balanchine's Who Cares?. In 1994, she was promoted to soloist, and started to substitute others in principal roles when required, including once in Balanchine's Walpurgisnacht Ballet, after only one rehearsal. In 1995, Weese won the Princess Grace Award.

In 1996, shortly before she turned 21, Weese was named principal dancer. She was the first woman to be promoted to this rank in the company since 1991. Her repertory included 25 ballets choreographed by George Balanchine, such as Theme and Variations, Apollo, "Emerald" and "Rubies" from Jewels, Symphony in C, Who Cares?, The Four Temperaments, Ballo della Regina, Symphony in Three Movements, Robert Schumann's Davidsbündlertänze, Divertimento No. 15 and as Sugar Plum Fairy and Dewdrop in The Nutcracker. She had also performed works by Jerome Robbins, Peter Martins and Christopher Wheeldon. For the latter, she had created roles in Mercurial Manoeuvres, Evenfalls and Shambards. She also created a role in Twyla Tharp's The Beethoven Seventh.

In 1999, Weese performed in a televised performance of Swan Lake as Odette-Odile under an hour's notice, in order to replace Darci Kistler, who got injured earlier that day. While Weese was Kistler's standby, she had never rehearsed her partner Damian Woetzel. In late 2001, she underwent surgery to repair torn cartilage in her hip, and was off stage for a year. While recovering, she gained significant weight and feared she would not be able to perform again. She returned to California to train with her teacher, then back to New York with ballet master Susan Hendl, while fellow dancers Peter Boal, Jock Soto and Woetzel also volunteered to work with her. She resumed performing in early 2003.

In 2007, Weese left the New York City Ballet to perform with the Pacific Northwest Ballet, a Seattle-based company headed by Boal, as a guest artist. In her final performance with the New York City Ballet, she performed Wheeldon's Evenfall. She stated the Pacific Northwest Ballet, where she had made a guest appearance before, has "a schedule and a lifestyle that's very appealing" to her, as she would have more time to prepare for roles, and the rehearsal and performance periods do not overlap. She first signed on for three seasons, then was added to the company roster as a principal dancer, and retired in 2010.

Following her departure from the Pacific Northwest Ballet, she moved to Saratoga, New York, and taught ballet and dance fitness at the National Museum of Dance School of the Arts. In 2017, she joined the Boston Ballet as children's ballet master.
