= Nutcracker: The Motion Picture =

- Original theatrical release poster
- Directed by: Carroll Ballard
- Based on: The Nutcracker by Pyotr Ilyich Tchaikovsky; The Nutcracker and the Mouse King by E. T. A. Hoffmann
- Produced by: Willard Carroll; Donald Kushner; Peter Locke; Thomas L. Wilhite
- Starring: Pacific Northwest Ballet
- Cinematography: Stephen H. Burum
- Edited by: John Nutt; Michael Silvers
- Music by: Pyotr Ilyich Tchaikovsky
- Production companies: Pacific Northwest Ballet; Hyperion Pictures; Kushner-Locke
- Distributed by: Atlantic Releasing Corporation
- Release date: November 26, 1986
- Running time: 85 minutes
- Country: United States
- Language: English
- Box office: $781,727

Nutcracker: The Motion Picture, also known as Pacific Northwest Ballet's Nutcracker or simply Nutcracker, is a 1986 American Christmas performing arts film produced by Pacific Northwest Ballet in association with Hyperion Pictures and Kushner/Locke, and released theatrically by Atlantic Releasing Corporation. It is a film adaptation of 1892 ballet The Nutcracker by Pyotr Ilyich Tchaikovsky and the 1816 short story "The Nutcracker and the Mouse King" by E. T. A. Hoffmann.

== Plot ==
Drosselmeyer, a clockmaker and toymaker, is in his workshop. Suddenly getting an idea, he begins building on an intricate mechanical project resembling a cross between a model castle, a music box, and a toy theatre. After it is apparently completed, he falls asleep at his work table. The toy theatre stage opens; the rest of the film is implied to take place on this stage. Clara, a girl on the verge of adolescence, is asleep in her bedroom, dreaming of dancing with a prince before being interrupted by her younger brother Fritz, who summons a giant rat to bite her hand, turning her ugly. She wakes up from the dream in terror. But when she goes to her family's Christmas party and sees Fritz playing with a hand puppet rat that strongly resembles the one in the dream, she becomes very uneasy.

Clara, her family, and all their guests dance at the Christmas party. Drosselmeyer, who is a friend of the family, enters the room and gives toys to the children. He also entertains them, especially Clara, by displaying the castle he was creating at the film's start, including moving figurines of a ballerina and a sword dancer. The guests are entertained by a trio of masquerade dancers, but Clara is noticeably uncomfortable around Drosselmeyer, who keeps looking at her. Suddenly, a nutcracker drops off the Christmas tree. Clara is amused by the nutcracker and dances happily around the room, but Fritz snatches it away and damages it with a toy sword. Drosselmeyer mends the nutcracker with a handkerchief. As the guests depart, Clara and Fritz are sent off to bed.

Near midnight, Clara goes downstairs to find her nutcracker. As the clock strikes twelve, the Christmas tree gets bigger and all the toy soldiers, as well as the nutcracker, come to life and battle the mice. A seven-headed Mouse King appears through a hole in the floor and grows to giant size. When the mice overpower the soldiers and the Nutcracker himself is threatened, Clara throws her slipper at the Mouse King, changing him into an ordinary mouse. What remains of the giant Mouse King is his coat and his crown. The Nutcracker crawls in the sleeve after the fleeing mouse and Clara follows him, becoming an adult as she wanders through the coat's passageways. She emerges from the coat onto a wintry pavilion, where she finds the Nutcracker transformed into a handsome prince. They dance romantically, and as they depart the snow falls and the snow fairies appear to dance the "Waltz of the Snowflakes".

Clara and the Prince sail away to a castle where they are welcomed by the Prince's Royal Court. There, the Prince and the jealous, one-eyed Pasha, who strongly resembles Drosselmeyer, develop a rivalry over Clara. Under the Pasha's direction, the members of the court perform divertissements, and Clara performs the "Dance of the Sugar Plum Fairy". She and the Prince dance a romantic "Pas de Deux". At the end, she and the Prince, locked in each other's arms, are magically levitated by the Pasha after bidding farewell to the Court. Suddenly the Pasha waves his hand, and Clara and her Prince are separated and begin to free-fall. Before they can hit the ground, the Prince turns back into a nutcracker and Clara (a young girl again) is jolted awake from what has turned out to be a dream.

== Production ==
=== Stage production ===
Pyotr Ilyich Tchaikovsky's popular 1892 ballet The Nutcracker is derived from E. T. A. Hoffmann's 1816 story The Nutcracker and the Mouse King. The ballet's scenario, crafted by Ivan Vsevolozhsky and Marius Petipa after a French adaptation by Alexandre Dumas, is far simpler and less nuanced than Hoffmann's original story. Vsevolozhsky and Petipa entirely omitted the Nutcracker character's complex backstory, "The Story of the Hard Nut," and expanded a short, satiric passage set in a Kingdom of Sweets to cover the whole of Act II. The ballet's scenario also introduced smaller changes, such as changing the heroine's name from Marie to Clara.

Choreographer Kent Stowell, the artistic director of the Pacific Northwest Ballet (PNB), first invited the author-illustrator Maurice Sendak to collaborate on a Nutcracker production in 1979, after Stowell's wife and colleague Francia Russell saw a Sendak-designed performance of Mozart's The Magic Flute in Houston. Sendak initially rejected Stowell's invitation, later explaining:

The Nutcrackers I've seen have all been dull. You have a simpering little girl, a Christmas party, a tree that gets big. Then you have a variety of people who do dances that seem to go on and on ad nauseam. Technically it's a mess, too; Acts I and II have practically nothing to do with each other. ... What you don't have is plot. No logic. You have lots of very pretty music, but I don't enjoy it because I'm a very pedantic, logical person. I want to know why things happen.

Stowell gave up for the moment, but contacted Sendak the following year, asking him to reconsider and suggesting that they "start from scratch." They began collaborating in earnest in 1981, developing a Nutcracker concept different from traditional productions, and closer to the themes in Hoffmann's original story.

PNB's Stowell/Sendak Nutcracker premiered in Seattle on December 13, 1983. It was a critical and popular success. Lincoln Kirstein, director of the New York City Ballet, called Sendak's production design "absolutely magnificent, and I was filled with a violent greed and envy." PNB continued to perform the Stowell/Sendak production annually for 31 years, ending in 2014; in 2015, the company premiered a production using George Balanchine's choreography from the New York City Ballet version, paired with designs by the illustrator Ian Falconer.

=== Adaptation for film ===
At the premiere of the stage production, two Walt Disney Studios executives encouraged Stowell and Sendak to turn their Nutcracker into a film, suggesting Carroll Ballard as director. Stowell and Sendak were interested with the proposal, but discussed at length whether it would be wiser simply to film the ballet on stage or to adapt it into a full-fledged film version. Ballard, who had met Sendak in Los Angeles in the early 1980s and who had previously directed The Black Stallion and the Disney-produced Never Cry Wolf, agreed to do the film after watching a performance in Seattle with his wife and 5-year-old daughter.

Ballard described his directorial approach as follows: "I tried to do two things. To use photography to capture, as best we could, the qualities of the dancers, and to strengthen the story so it would be more appropriate for the film." Ballard especially wanted to clarify that most of the story is dreamed by Clara. In the process of adaptation to film, Stowell revised large portions of his choreography; Sendak revised some designs, and created additional ones from scratch.

Part of Ballard's adaptation was intended to focus the characters' psychology, as he later elaborated:

I particularly changed the nature of the relationship between Clara and Drosselmeyer. In the ballet, he's a mischievous sort of dirty old man, always playing tricks on people. I tried to make him a kind of anti-social guy with no family who is obsessed with making toys. His only relationship is with this little girl. I tried to make him sympathetic.

Willard Carroll, one of the producers, told the press that the production team "rethought [Nutcracker] for film the way Kent and Maurice rethought it for the stage. Basically, it's a silent movie done with visual comedy and emotion." Tom Wilhite, another producer, described the adaptation as "a cross between an MGM musical and a Korda picture." The animator Henry Selick assisted in the adaptation, shooting second unit for the film as well as drawing storyboards and contributing new fantasy sequences. In a 2021 interview, Ballard reported that he and Sendak were eager to incorporate much more of the Hoffmann story into the film version, without success:

I was struggling, trying to make it into a thing of its own rather than just filming the stage version. Both Maurice and I were arguing to […] somehow bring more of "The Hard Nut" into the story, give it a little more weight as a film. But the guys who were [providing] the money were intractable. They thought they could make a cheap Christmas film out of it and make some money. And that was it.

=== Filming and music ===
Due to budget restrictions, all footage for Nutcracker was filmed over a period of ten days. Meany Hall for the Performing Arts, on the University of Washington campus, was used as a filming location. Parts of the film were also shot in Salt Lake City, Utah. The film's cast is made up of PNB dancers from the stage production. Vanessa Sharp, a 12-year-old dancer, played Clara. Hugh Bigney, at 30, used a false chin, nose, and bald cap to play the much older role of Drosselmeyer; Bigney's young daughter also appeared in the film as a baby mouse. Other leads included Patricia Barker as the older Clara in the dream, and Wade Walthall as the Nutcracker Prince. The actress Julie Harris recorded narration for the film.

In an interview during production, Ballard noted he was eager to avoid the cinematic idiosyncrasies of recent dance films, such as Nijinsky (1980), which had filmed its dancers mostly from the knee up. "I think it's important to see the whole dancer ... Where we have a great performance, you'll see it all," he said. "I want to avoid movie trickery. It's a helluva lot tougher to shoot than I thought it would be."

During production, Ballard had numerous disputes with Sendak. "More often, he won," reported Sendak. "After all, he was working in a medium in which I was a novice."

For the film's soundtrack, Sir Charles Mackerras conducted the London Symphony Orchestra at the Watford Town Hall in London in a new recording of Tchaikovsky's score. The choral section of "Waltz of the Snowflakes" was performed by the Tiffin School Boys' Choir. The soundtrack also includes the "Duet of Daphnis and Chloe" from Tchaikovsky's opera The Queen of Spades, performed by Cathryn Pope and Sarah Walker. Telarc released the complete soundtrack on compact disc, coinciding with the release of the film.

== Themes ==
Nutcracker: The Motion Picture, like the Stowell-Sendak stage production on which it is based, is presented as Clara's coming-of-age story. It depicts Clara's inner conflict and confusion, as well as the beginning of her sexual awakening, as she approaches adolescence; similar themes occur in many of Sendak's books. The film especially emphasizes the darker aspects of Hoffmann's original story and the significance of dreams and the imagination. The cinematography, by making considerable use of closeups and medium shots, attempts to bring viewers closer to the psychology of the main characters.

== Reception ==
Reviewers largely praised the film's design, but criticized the camerawork and editing, particularly for its use of closeups and medium shots. For example, in The New York Times, Janet Maslin gave Nutcracker a mixed review, describing it as "an ornate film that takes a sophisticated and ambitious approach to its material. And it shows why there's no good substitute for simply holding the camera still and letting dancers do what they do best." In the Los Angeles Times, Sheila Benson lauded the production design as "the Sendak spirit triumphant," but criticized the PNB dancers and the editing: "We see faces when we want to see whole figures ... Unless Ballard is cutting away out of kindness, which is a possibility." Roger Ebert's Chicago Sun Times review was similarly mixed: "It has been staged with great care and considerable beauty but it is nevertheless just a respectable version of a cultural artifact." Ballard responded to criticism about the editing in a post-release The New York Times interview, saying that the editing style was not what he had initially planned, but was a necessary result of the tight filming schedule.

The film was nominated for a Young Artist Award for Best Family Motion Picture Drama in 1988. Ballard and Sendak remained friends and discussed other possible collaborations; Ballard was eager to film Sendak's picture book Very Far Away, for which Sendak prepared a screenplay adaptation, but they were unable to convince producers of the project's feasibility.

== Release ==
The film was released on VHS, Betamax, and Laserdisc a few times in the 1980s and 1990s by Paramount Home Video, KVC Home Video, GoodTimes Home Video, and PolyGram Video respectively. In 2011, MGM Home Entertainment through their Limited Edition Collection label and through 20th Century Fox Home Entertainment released it on DVD for the first time with the film's theatrical trailer as the only bonus material. In December 2017, Olive Films (under license from MGM) re-released the film on DVD and Blu-ray.

== See also ==
- List of Christmas films
