= Elegy (Stravinsky) =

1944 composition for solo viola by Igor Stravinsky

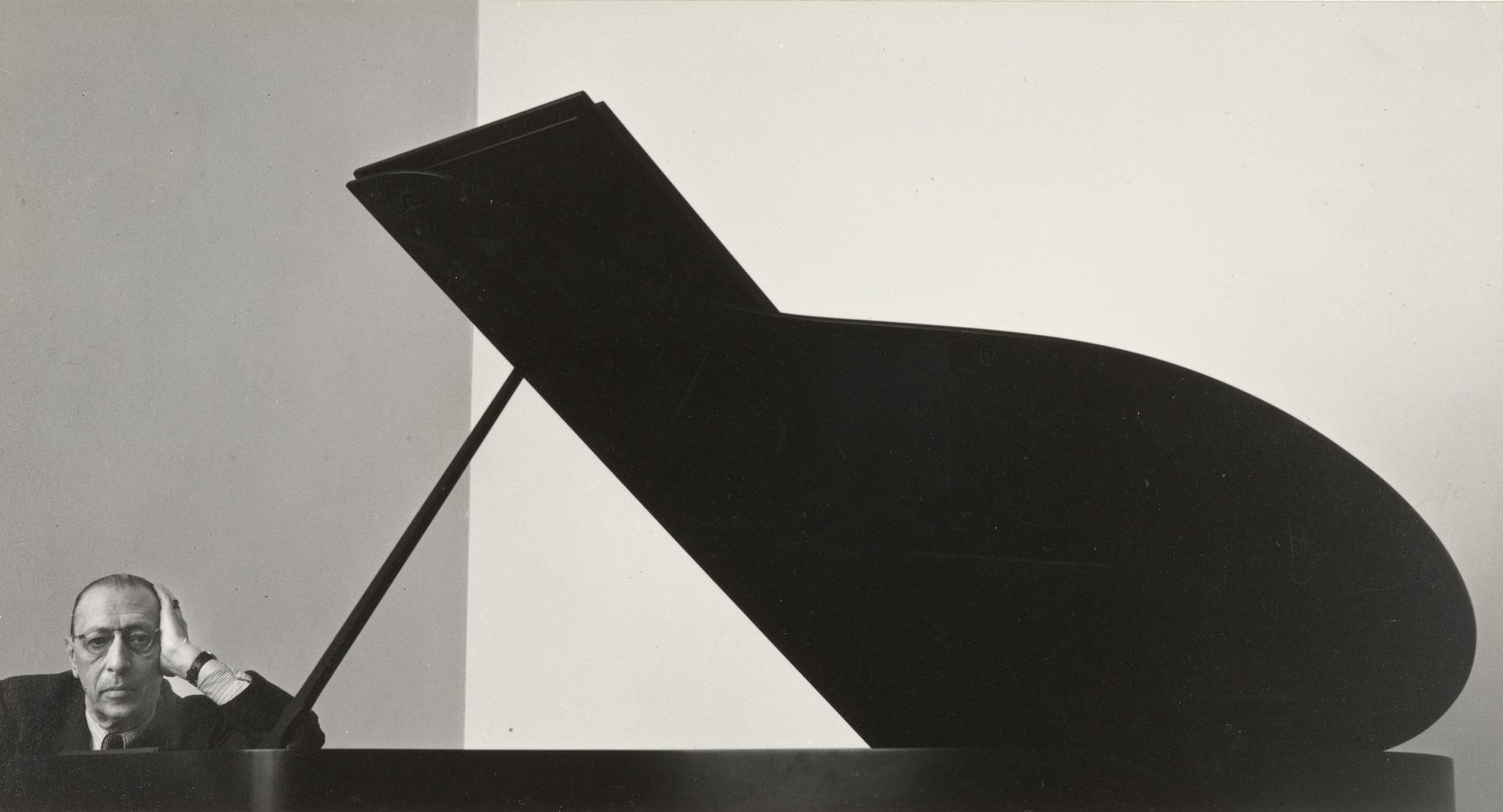
Photograph of Stravinsky by Arnold Newman

Elegy is a composition by Igor Stravinsky for solo viola composed in 1944. It was dedicated to the memory of Alphonse Onnou, the founder of the Pro Arte Quartet. The score bears no time signature, but the metronome marking sets the tempo at = 56. The opening section is in the style of a chant above a rippling accompaniment. The middle section contains elements of a fugue, though there are never more than two independent voices. After its climax, the Elegy closes with a recapitulation of its opening. The viola is directed to play with mute throughout.

The piece can alternately be played by a solo violin pitched a fifth higher.

== Choreography ==
Élégie
- Choreographer: George Balanchine
- Music: Igor Stravinsky
- Genre: Neoclassical ballet
- Type: Classical ballet

Elegy was later choreographed as a neoclassical ballet by George Balanchine. He made three versions of the ballet, which premiered in 1948, 1966, and 1982 respectively.

External videos
- Carla Körbes in "Elégie" - 2012 Vail International Dance Festival , YouTube video

The first version, a pas de deux, premiered on April 28, 1948 at the City Center of Music and Drama, during a Ballet Society performance, with dancers Tanaquil Le Clercq and Pat McBride, and violist Emanuel Vardi. Stravinsky described this version as a preview of a pas de deux from the ballet Orpheus.

The second version is a solo premiered on July 15, 1966 at the Philharmonic Hall, performed by dancer Suzanne Farrell and violist Jesse Levine, in a program about Stravinsky directed by Lukas Foss. The New York City Ballet premiered it later that month with the same cast.

The last version, again with Farrell, premiered on June 13, 1982 at the New York State Theater, as part of NYCB's Stravinsky Centennial Celebration, with Warren Laffredo playing the viola on stage. Balanchine died the following year. It was not revived until 2012 at the Vail Dance Festival, danced by Pacific Northwest Ballet's Carla Körbes. Artistic director of the festival Damian Woetzel learned the choreography via tapes of Farrell, then taught it to Körbes. In 2020, due to the coronavirus pandemic, the festival streamed video of the 2012 performance online.
