= Carrie Imler =

American ballet dancer

- Born: 1977 or 1978 (age 47–48)
- Education: Central Pennsylvania Youth Ballet; Pacific Northwest Ballet School; Seattle University
- Occupation: ballet dancer
- Career
- Former groups: Pacific Northwest Ballet

Carrie Imler (born 1977 or 1978) is an American ballet dancer. She joined the Pacific Northwest Ballet in 1995 and became a principal dancer in 2002. She retired in 2017, following a 22-year career, and started teaching at the company's school.

== Early life ==
Imler was raised in Carlisle, Pennsylvania. She received her ballet training at the Central Pennsylvania Youth Ballet, Pacific Northwest Ballet School, and summer intensives at the School of American Ballet.

== Career ==
In 1995, Imler joined the Pacific Northwest Ballet as an apprentice, and joined the corps de ballet the following year. She was promoted to soloist in 2000, and principal dancer two years later following a performance of The Rite of Spring.

Imler had danced lead roles in nearly 100 ballets, such as Swan Lake, Don Quixote, The Merry Widow and Giselle, and works by George Balanchine, Twyla Tharp and Alexei Ratmansky. According to colleague Jonathan Porretta, she could jump as high as the men in the company. A video of Imler dancing the 32 fouetté turns from the Black Swan pas de deux from Swan Lake went viral on YouTube.

Imler retired from performing in 2017. In her last performance, she danced Balanchine's Theme and Variations, the Black Swan pas de deux, an excerpt from Tharp's Nine Sinatra Songs and a new ballet by Kiyon Gaines. Having been in the company for twenty-two years, she and Batkhurel Bold, a frequent partner who retired the same year, are the company's longest-serving principal dancers. Following her retirement, she joined the company school's faculty.

== Personal life ==
Imler started studying at the Seattle University in 2007, while recovering from a hip injury.
