= Zsilas Michael Hughes =

American ballet dancer

- Born: 2002 or 2003 (age 22–23)
- Career
- Current group: Pacific Northwest Ballet
- Dances: Ballet

Zsilas Michael Hughes (born 2002 or 2003) is an American ballet dancer and choreographer. They are a member of the corps de ballet at Pacific Northwest Ballet.

== Career ==
Hughes is African-American and from Little Rock, Arkansas. They danced at Central Pennsylvania Youth Ballet. Hughes joined PNB as an apprentice in 2021, and was promoted to corps de ballet in 2022.

Hughes began dancing en pointe in 2020, with the support of PNB artistic director Peter Boal. Hughes has said that working en pointe has made them a better dancer when performing the supportive roles in pas de deux, as they now better understand how the ankle and foot of their partner should be aligned.

Hughes has also performed with Ballet22, a company based in Oakland, California which "presents straight and queer male, trans, and nonbinary dancers on pointe, in their true gender identities".

In 2023, Hughes choreographed the new piece Piano Concerto Appasionata in B Minor for 13 dancers. NW Theatre said of the work, "Hughes’ work is complex but not confusing, intricate but not busy". Hughes has also choreographed work that has combined more classical ballet technique with ballroom and voguing.

Hughes has been noted for their stage presence and "lovely rubato quality".

== Personal life ==
Hughes is non-binary, and uses they/them, he/him, and she/her pronouns. They moved to Seattle in January 2021.

In addition to ballet, Hughes is active in the region's ballroom scene.

== Repertoire ==
- Allegro Brillante (Balanchine)
- A Midsummer Night’s Dream (Balanchine), Fairy
- The Nutcracker (Balanchine), Snow, Flowers, Peacock, Mouse King
- Quick Pleasures (Kiyon Ross)
- throes of increasing wonder (Kiyon Ross)
- The Seasons’ Canon (Crystal Pite)
- The Times Are Racing (Justin Peck)

== Awards and recognition ==
- 2017 Youth America Grand Prix (YAGP); First Place in Classical/Contemporary division
