= Ethan Stowell =

American chef and restaurateur

- Occupations: Chef; restaurateur
- Parent: Francia Russell

Ethan Stowell is an American chef and restaurateur. Based in Seattle, his restaurants include Goldfinch Tavern, Red Cow, Rione XIII, and Tavolàta. He is the founder and chief executive officer of Ethan Stowell Restaurants and a co-founder of the Good Table Group, a restaurant consulting business.

== Career and recognition ==
In 2008, Stowell was named Best New Chef by Food & Wine. As of 2016, he owned 13 restaurants in Seattle. In 2020, he was a semifinalist in the James Beard Foundation Award's Outstanding Restaurateur category. He launched a consulting firm in 2026.

== Personal life ==
Stowell is the son of the ballet dancer Francia Russell and her husband, Kent Stowell.

== See also ==
- List of chefs
- List of people from Seattle
- Mt. Joy (restaurant)
- Rubinstein Bagels
