= Red Cow (restaurant) =

Restaurant in Seattle, Washington, U.S.

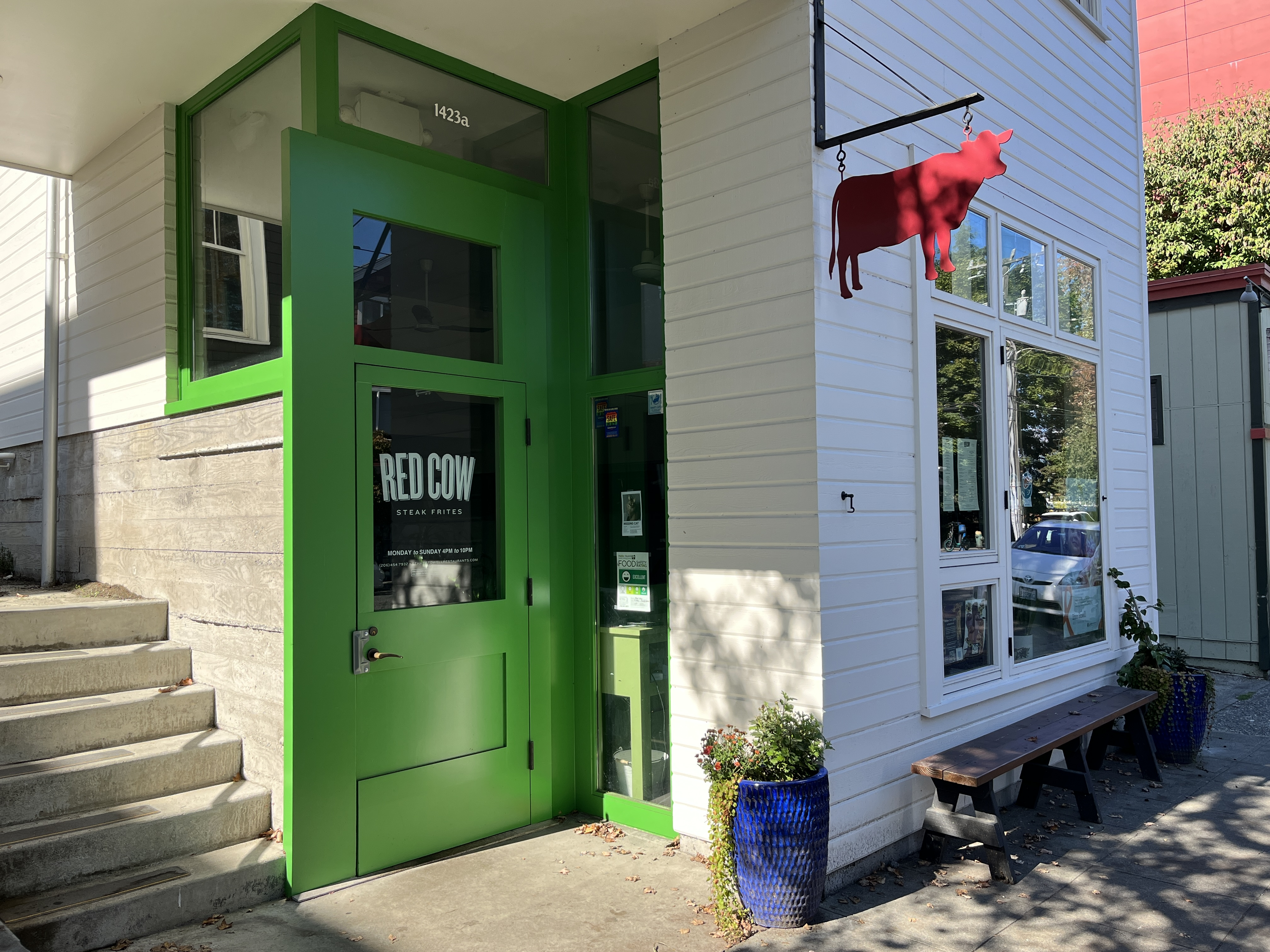
- The restaurant's exterior, 2023
- Interactive map of Red Cow

Restaurant information
- Food type: French
- Location: 1423 34th Avenue, Seattle, Washington, 98122, United States
- Coordinates: 47.6136°N 122.2896°W

Red Cow is a restaurant in Seattle, in the U.S. state of Washington.

== Description ==
The Ethan Stowell restaurant in Seattle's Madrona neighborhood has a French bistro menu focused on steak frites. Lonely Planet says, "The decor is typical Stowell – open kitchen, intimate interior and clean-lined minimalist design – while the menu star is steak (seven different cuts), frites and garlic aioli. On other plates, the food doesn't stray too far from France. Bank on lamb terrine, vol-au-vents and moules-frites (mussels and fries)."

== History ==
The restaurant opened on February 10, 2014.

== See also ==
- List of French restaurants
- List of restaurants in Seattle
