= Christopher Janney =

American composer, artist, and architect (born 1950)

Christopher Janney (born 1950) was trained as a composer, artist, and architect. He is known for his work on the interrelation of architecture and music. Sometimes he attempts to make architecture more like music, as in his sound sculptures titled "Urban Musical Instruments", of which "Soundstair" and "Sonic Forest" are examples. Other times, he attempts to make music more like architecture. Titled "Physical Music," he has created performance projects which include "Percussion Discussion," "Sonic Dream" and "HeartBeat," a piece where Mikhail Baryshnikov danced to the sound of his own heartbeat "in real time".

Much of Janney's research and permanent work has sought to create "permanent interactive sound-works for public spaces that generate playful, creative and healing environments in high-stress public spaces". His installations can be found at the Dallas, Boston, Miami, Sacramento, Atlanta airports and in the New York City Subway.

Janney has toured his "Sonic Forest" installation at major music festivals including Bonnaroo and Coachella in the US, as well as Glastonbury and Hyde Park Calling in the UK.

In 2014, Janney presented an evening-length concert at the Gramercy Theater/NYC titled "Exploring the Hidden Music." He created new versions of his "Visual Music Project", "HeartBeat", "Drone Drone" and his quadraphonic sound installation, "CyberMonks." Additional performers included bassist/producer Bill Laswell (B. Eno, D. Byrne, H. Hancock), percussionist Sheila E. (Santana, Prince), tabla/drummer Trilok Gurtu (J.Zawinul, J. McLaughlin), singer Lynn Mabry (Brides of Funkenstein), Dave Revels (Persuasions) and choreographer Sara Rudner (Twyla Tharp Dance).

A book on his work, titled Architecture of the Air, was released in February, 2007.

He currently lives in Los Angeles, CA.

== Biography ==
Janney grew up in Washington, D.C. He received a B.A. degree (1973, magna cum laude) from Princeton University, where he studied with Michael Graves, James Seawright, Carol Bankerd, and Rosalind Krauss. In 1974, his band, ORION—A Jazz/Rock Collective, won the WRVR jazz competition and performed at Lincoln Center with Gil Scott-Heron, Charles Earland, and Pat Martino. After graduation, he studied percussion and music at the Dalcroze School of Music (see Eurhythmics) and Mannes College of Music in New York City. During this time, Janney also worked with various artists and dance companies, including dancers Merce Cunningham and Sara Rudner, as well as artists Jack Youngerman, Claes Oldenburg, and Robert Irwin.

In 1976, Janney moved to Boston, MA to pursue an MS degree in Environmental Art at the Massachusetts Institute of Technology. His thesis (under Professor Otto Piene) in 1978 was titled SOUNDSTAIR: The Nature of Environmental/Participatory Art.

From 1978 to 1990, Janney was a Research Fellow at MIT at The Center for Advanced Visual Studies. During this time, Janney developed his own multi-media studio, PhenomenArts, Inc., combining his interests in music and architecture. Since that time, he has created numerous permanent interactive sound/light installations and performances, including:

- Harmonic Convergence – Miami Airport, Miami, FL
- REACH:NY – 34th St. Subway station, New York, NY
- HeartBeat:mb – performance with Sara Rudner and Mikhail Baryshnikov
- Soundstair – Boston Museum of Science; Science Museum of Minnesota; Boston Children's Hospital; and St. Jude Children's Research Hospital
- Soundstair: The Spanish Steps – (temporary) Spanish Steps, Rome, Italy
- Harmonic Grove – Our Lady of the Lake Children's Hospital, Baton Rouge, LA
- A House Is A Musical Instrument – Private Residence, Kona, Hawaii
- Touch My Building – Charlotte, NC
- Circling – Dallas-Ft. Worth Airport, Arlington, TX

Janney lectures widely on his work. He has been a visiting professor at both The Cooper Union School of Architecture and Pratt Institute School of Architecture, where he taught his seminar "Sound as a Visual Medium".

He currently serves as president and artistic director for PhenomenArts, Inc., a company which specializes in environmental arts and design based in Los Angeles, CA.

He received an MS degree (1978) in Environmental Art at the Massachusetts Institute of Technology; his thesis (under Professor Otto Piene) was titled SOUNDSTAIR: The Nature of Environmental/Participatory Art. From 1978 to 1990, Janney was a Research Fellow at MIT at The Center for Advanced Visual Studies.

== Urban musical instruments ==
Janney has created a number of temporary and permanent installations in the US and Europe titled "Urban Musical Instruments." A good example of this work is "Sonic Forest," consisting of 8 ft. tall by 10" diameter cylindrical aluminum columns, placed in site-specific patterns. Each column contains a series of photo-sensors, an audio speaker, LED cone-light, and star-strobe. By strolling among and touching the columns, people trigger the photo-sensors, activating the light and an ever-changing "sound score" of melodic tones, environmental sounds, and text.

"Soundstair", a site-specific interactive light/sound installation, has toured throughout the US and Europe, including a temporary installation on the Spanish Steps in Rome, Italy.

== Exploring the Hidden Music ==
"Exploring the Hidden Music" was first performed in 1985 at The Kennedy Center in Washington, DC. It is composed of both a three-day temporary site-specific sound/light public installation and an evening-length concert featuring different Janney compositions, including "Drone Drone," "Bumble Be-Bop," "Sonic Dream," and "HeartBeat."

== SoundStair: The Nature of Environmental/Participatory Art ==
The original installation, his MIT thesis, Soundstair 1978, is a permanent piece in the Boston Museum of Science.

Other permanent locations of Soundstair (the musical stairs) include:

- "Soundstair: Minnesota" – Science Museum of Minnesota, St. Paul, MN
- "Soundstair: Macon" – Macon Museum of Arts and Sciences, Macon, GA
- "Soundstair: Charleston" – South Carolina Aquarium, Charleston, SC
- "Soundstair: CHB" – Boston Children's Hospital, Boston, MA
- "Soundstair: St. Jude's" – St. Jude Children's Research Hospital, Memphis, TN

== Other major projects ==
- "Harmonic Convergence" – Miami Airport, 2005
- "REACH: New York" – 34th St. Subway, New York, NY, 1996
- "Turn Up The Heat" – interactive scoreboard for the Miami Arena, Miami, FL, 2000
- "A House Is a Musical instrument" – Kona, Hawaii, 2000
- "Whistle Grove: The National Steamboat Monument" – Cincinnati, OH, 2002
- "Harmonic Convergence" – Miami Airport, 2011
- "Light Waves: Atlanta" – Atlanta Airport, Atlanta, GA, 2012
- "LightShadow: MLK" – Cambridge, MA, 2016
- "HeartBeat: LMU" – Los Angeles, CA, 2025
- "LightShadow: BCHC" – Belmont, MA, 2026

== See also ==
- Environmental art
- Environmental sculpture
- Sound art

== Reference works ==
- Janney, Christopher. Architecture of the Air: The Sound and Light Environments of Christopher Janney. New York: Sideshow Media, 2007. ISBN 978-0-9788143-0-4
