= Nine Sinatra Songs =

- Choreographer: Twyla Tharp
- Music: Frank Sinatra
- Premiere: October 14, 1982; Queen Elizabeth Theatre, Vancouver
- Original ballet company: Twyla Tharp Dance
- Design: Oscar de la Renta; Jennifer Tipton

Nine Sinatra Songs is a ballet choreographed by Twyla Tharp to songs sung by Frank Sinatra. The ballet is danced by seven couples, portraying different stages of romantic relationships, with ballroom dancing incorporated into the choreography. The ballet was made for Twyla Tharp Dance, and premiered on October 14, 1982, at Queen Elizabeth Theatre, Vancouver, Canada.

== Development ==
Nine Sinatra Songs is Tharp's second foray into choreographing to Sinatra's songs. Her first attempt was One More Frank (1976), made for an American Ballet Theatre gala, danced by her and Mikhail Baryshnikov. The work was booed by the audience as it did not contain any virtuosic steps expected from Baryshnikov.

Tharp made Nine Sinatra Songs for the Twyla Tharp Dance. The ballet, danced by seven couples, depicts different stages of romantic relationships. After researching ballroom dancing, particularly the couple Vernon and Irene Castle, for the 1981 film Ragtime, Tharp decided to incorporate ballroom dancing into the choreography of Nine Sinatra Songs, with the women dancing in heels. Tharp had planned to dance in the ballet, but her role was ultimately danced by Sara Rudner.

Tharp chose songs from the 1950s and 1960s, a time "when my parents were together, when all parents were together, the last time we assumed as a culture that of course men and women lived together and loved for a lifetime, a condition I was still craving but begin to see as against all odds." Despite the title, the ballet only contains eight songs, with a reprise for "My Way". The reprise, however, uses a recording a later live performance at the Madison Square Garden. Tharp found that in this recording, "Sinatra's voice is much more mature, his passion deeper and stronger, his commitment absolutely secure."

Oscar de la Renta designed the costume, with women in 1950s style gowns and men in tuxedos. The lighting was designed by Jennifer Tipton.

== Songs ==
- "Softly, as I Leave You"
- "Strangers in the Night"
- "One for My Baby (and One More for the Road)"
- "My Way"
- "Somethin' Stupid"
- "All the Way"
- "Forget Domani"
- "That's Life"
- "My Way" reprise

== Original cast ==
- Shelley Freydont
- Mary Ann Kellogg
- Sara Rudner
- Amy Spencer
- Christine Uchida
- Shelley Washington
- Jennifer Way
- John Carrafa
- Gary Chryst
- Richard Colton
- Raymond Kurshals
- Tom Rawe
- William Whitener
- Keith Young

== Performances ==
Nine Sinatra Songs premiered on October 14, 1982, at Queen Elizabeth Theatre, Vancouver.

Other ballet companies that had performed the ballet include American Ballet Theatre, Pacific Northwest Ballet, Washington Ballet, Ballet West, Hubbard Street Dance Chicago and Birmingham Royal Ballet.

In 1983, Tharp revised material from the ballet to make Sinatra Suite for American Ballet Theatre, with Baryshnikov and Elaine Kudo dancing. This ballet features songs "Strangers in the Night", "All the Way", "That's Life" and "My Way", while "One For My Baby (and One More For the Road)" was rechoreographed to a male solo. In 2010, Tharp incorporated songs used in Nine Sinatra Songs into her dance revue Come Fly Away, with three numbers intact.
