= Goldfinch Tavern =

New American restaurant in Seattle, Washington, U.S.

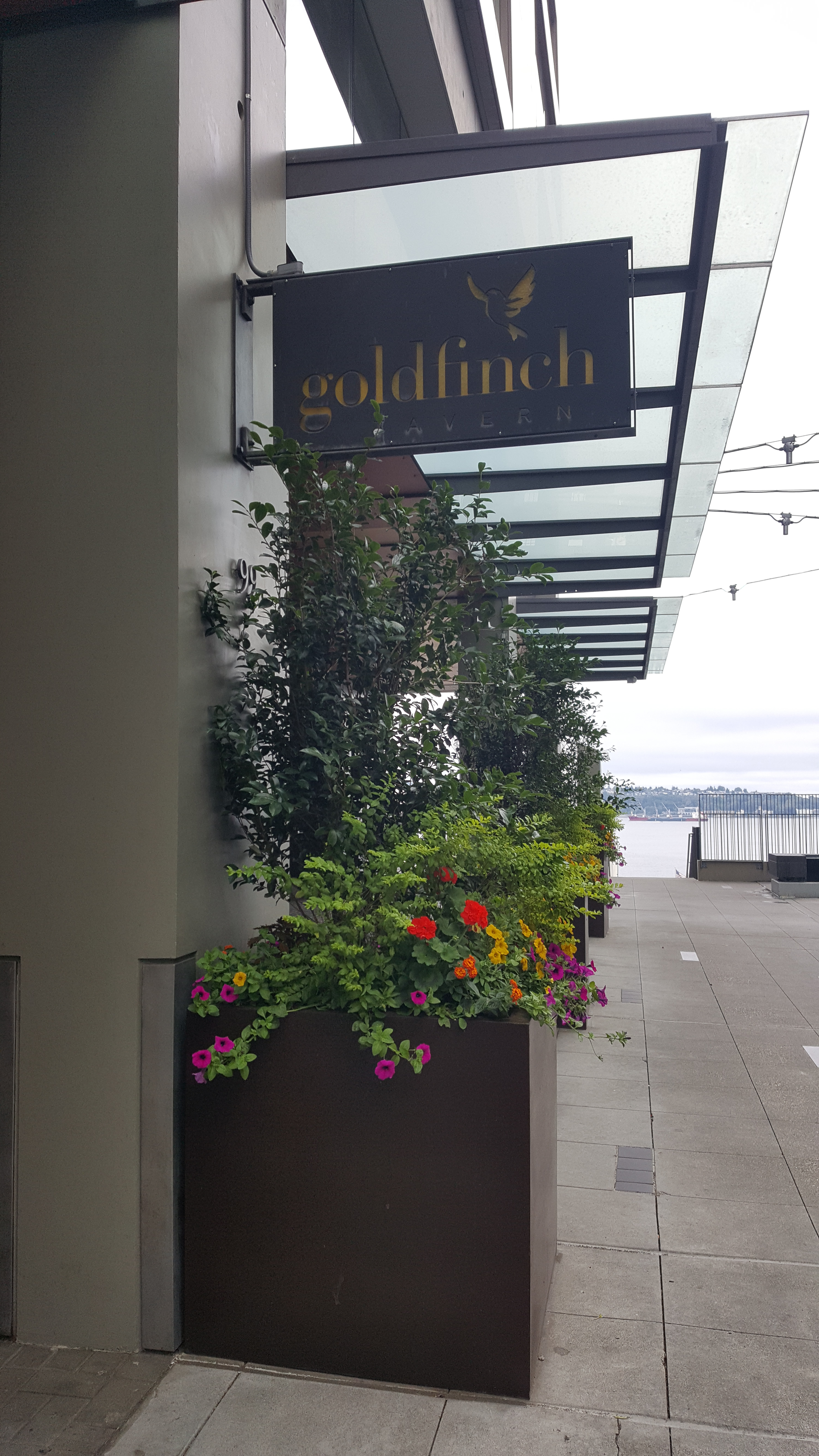
- The restaurant's exterior, 2022
- Interactive map of Goldfinch Tavern

Restaurant information
- Food type: New American
- Location: Seattle, Washington, United States
- Coordinates: 47°36′27″N 122°20′22″W
- Website: goldfinchtavern.com

Goldfinch Tavern is a New American restaurant in Seattle's Central Waterfront, in the U.S. state of Washington.

== Description ==
Housed in the Four Seasons Hotel, the Goldfinch Tavern is a Pacific Northwest-focused, New American restaurant operated by chef Ethan Stowell. The dinner menu has included oysters, hamachi and geoduck crudo, king crab, Penn Cove mussels, ricotta ravioli with local porcini mushrooms, and wild king salmon. The restaurant has also served crab cakes, pastas, quail, and Wagyu burgers.

== History ==
The restaurant opened in June 2015.

== See also ==
- List of New American restaurants
