= Catacombs of Generosa =

Ancient Roman site

Coordinates: 41.8361°N 12.4328°E

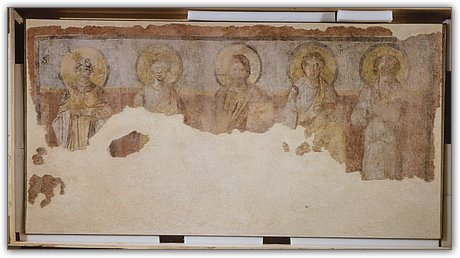
The "Coronatio Martyrum" in the Catacombs of Generosa

The Catacomb of Generosa is a catacomb of Rome (Italy), located in Via delle Catacombe di Generosa, close to a big bight of river Tiber on the right bank, in the Portuense quarter.

== Toponym ==
The name of the catacomb, as for most of Roman catacombs, derives from the name of the founder or patron of the plot of land on which the burial hypogeum complex arose. The catacomb was also known with the suffix “ad sextum Philippi” (or “super Philippi”), from the former name of the area where the catacomb now lies: it indicated the sixth mile of former Via Campana. “Philippus” probably refers to a rich laird in the area.

== Topography ==
The Catacomb of Generosa is part of an archeological complex, rich of remains not just Christian, but also pagan. In fact, on the upper land a sacred precinct (known as the sacred wood at Magliana) has been found: it includes the ancient pagan college of the Arval Brethres, a pagan priestly association, whose origins date back to republican Rome, consecrated to the worship of Goddess Dia, whose temple has been identified into the same precinct: Arval Brethres recorded their religious and cultural life on marble plates (the Acta fratrium Arvalium), many of which have come to us thanks to their reuse as sheets for the paving of the Basilica of Generosa. The catacomb is situated inside a hill and occupies a single level. The former entrance of the catacomb, just like other Roman catacombs, was inside a basilica, built under Pope Damasus I in the second half of 4th century, whose remains have been discovered by Giovanni Battista de Rossi in the 19th century. In the apse a fenestella confessionis (little window for confession) allowed to see the main place of worship, while a side door gave access to the catacomb.

The present entrance of the catacomb has been recently built and it is made of a tiny brick structure closed by an iron door.

== History ==
According to the tradition, the catacomb first served as burial place for martyrs Simplicius and Faustinus, killed in 303 under Diocletian. The hypogeum graveyard served mainly for the entombment of the farmers of the surroundings and therefore it shows a sober and poor style. Near 382 Pope Damasus built the semi-hypogeum basilica and the catacomb ceased being a graveyard and became a place of worship of the martyrs there buried. In 682 Pope Leo II moved the relics of the martyrs of Generosa in the church of Santa Bibiana on the Esquiline Hill: the catacomb was thereby gradually abandoned and its location was forgotten.

The discovery, in the 19th century, of marble inscriptions inspired the interest of the archaeologist Giovanni de Rossi, who in 1868 discovered the remains of the basilica and soon after the Catacomb of Generosa. The catacomb was restored in the 1930s by Enrico Josi. Further archaeological campaigns were carried out by the Ecole Française of Rome between 1980 and 1986: they allowed to ascertain the exact dimension of the above-ground basilica, that had three naves shared by pilasters.

== The martyrs of Generosa ==
The martyrs memorialized into the Catacomb of Generosa are four, nowadays usually called the portuenses saint martyrs: Simplicius, Faustinus, Beatrix and Rufinianus. Of the last one absolutely nothing is known. The high-medieval passio tells that the brothers Simplicius and Faustinus died firstly, killed and thrown into the Tiber near Tiber Island; the stream would have trailed their bodies up to the bight of Tiber “iuxta locum qui appellatur sextus Philippi” ("close to a place that is called the Sixth of Philippus"), where they would have beached; they were picked up by their sister Beatrix and placed into the Catacomb of Generosa. Later the same Beatrix was martyrized and buried next to her brothers.

== Description ==
The most important locus of the entire catacomb is the martyrs' crypt, at the back of the apse of the external basilica. It hosted a fresco with Byzantine features, called Coronatio Martyrum ("Coronation of Martyrs"), dating to the sixth century. It portrays five figures: the central one is Christ, handing the crown of martyrdom to Simplicius, with Beatrix at his side; to the left of Christ are Faustinus, bearing the palm of martyrdom in his hand, and Rufinianus. The fresco was seriously damaged when Giovanni Battista de Rossi, in the nineteenth century, attempted to remove it; it again deteriorated when it was transferred to canvas; it was restored in 1983.

== Bibliography ==
- De Santis L. - G. Biamonte, Le catacombe di Roma, Newton & Compton Editori, Roma 1997, pp. 115–124
