= Tavolàta =

Italian restaurant based in Seattle, Washington, U.S.

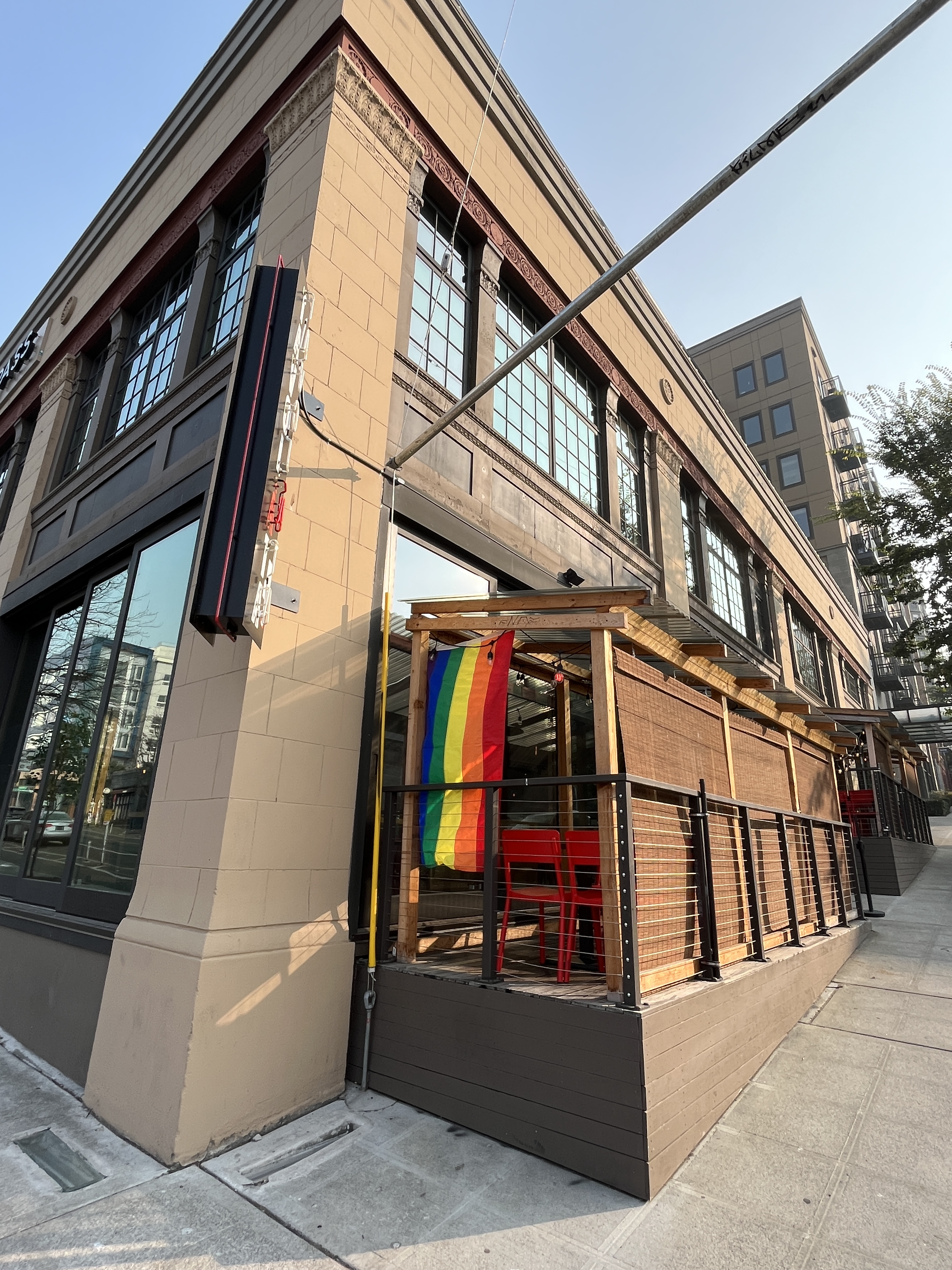
- Exterior of the restaurant on Capitol Hill in Seattle, 2022

Restaurant information
- Food type: Italian
- Location: Washington, United States

Tavolàta is an Italian restaurant by Ethan Stowell with multiple locations in the Seattle metropolitan area, in the U.S. state of Washington. The business has operated in Belltown, Capitol Hill, Fremont, and Redmond. Each location has a communal table. Plans to expand into Spokane were announced in 2020.

Fodor's says of the Belltown location, "Serving up Italian goodness by the plateful in an industrial-chic bi-level space, Tavolàta is a decidedly lively, loud, and delicious night out on the town. Skinny-jeaned young things mingle with families here—and everyone has fun." The Capitol Hill restaurant has a patio.

== See also ==
- List of Italian restaurants
