= Rione XIII =

Italian restaurant in Seattle, Washington, U.S.

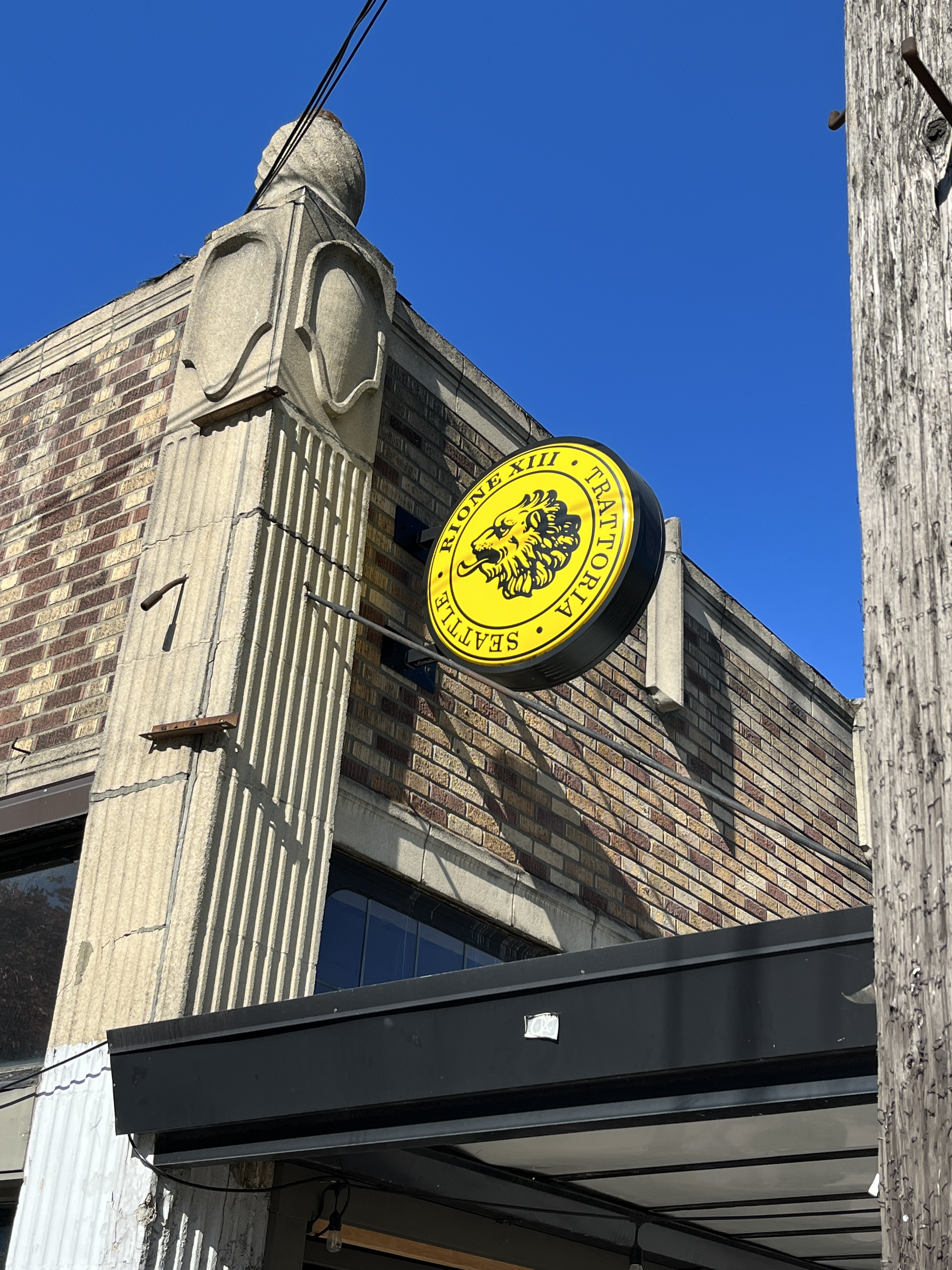
- The restaurant's exterior, 2022
- Interactive map of Rione XIII

Restaurant information
- Food type: Italian
- Location: Seattle, King, Washington, United States
- Coordinates: 47°37′19.5″N 122°18′46.3″W

Rione XIII is an Italian restaurant in Seattle, in the U.S. state of Washington.

== Description ==
Rione XIIII is an Ethan Stowell restaurant in Seattle's Capitol Hill neighborhood. The menu has included pizza, fried artichokes, and pastas such as cacio e pepe and carbonara.

== History ==
During the COVID-19 pandemic, the pizzeria operated via carry-out and later used a street closure permit for outdoor seating.

== Reception ==
Seattle Metropolitan included Rione XIII in a 2021 list of Capitol Hill's best restaurants and a 2022 list of the city's best Italian cuisine. Gabe Guarente, Mark Van Streefkerk, and Jade Yamazaki Stewart included the business in Eater Seattle's 2022 list of 25 "essential" restaurants on Capitol Hill.

== See also ==
- List of Italian restaurants
