= Peter Boal =

American ballet dancer

Peter Boal is artistic director of Pacific Northwest Ballet and director of its affiliated school in Seattle, Washington. He was born in Bedford, New York, in 1965 and began studies at the School of American Ballet (SAB) at age nine.

Boal assumed the directorship of Pacific Northwest Ballet in 2005 (from Kent Stowell and Francia Russell) following a successful career with the New York City Ballet (NYCB) which he joined in 1983 and where he was promoted to soloist in 1987, principal dancer in 1989, and from which he retired in 2005. He received his dance training from SAB under the directorship of George Balanchine.

In 2002, he founded Peter Boal and Company, a critically acclaimed chamber ensemble. Boal joined the faculty of SAB in 1997, teaching technique, variations, men’s and women’s classes, and partnering. He was a guest teacher at the Central Pennsylvania Youth Ballet and the Royal Danish Ballet's school.

Peter Boal gave his final performance at City Ballet on Sunday, June 5, 2005. On a program that also included Robbins’ West Side Story Suite and Balanchine’s Agon, he chose to dance Jerome Robbins’ Opus 19/The Dreamer and an excerpt from Apollo, a role for which he was particularly noted.

While at SAB, he danced in several ballets with NYCB, including Balanchine’s The Nutcracker, in which he performed the role of the Nutcracker Prince. At City Ballet he has featured roles in over 40 ballets and had over 20 additional roles created on him by choreographers including Jerome Robbins, Peter Martins, Christopher Wheeldon, Christopher d'Amboise, Ulysses Dove and Twyla Tharp.

== Personal life ==
Peter Boal married Kelly Boal (Cass) (also a dancer with NYCB) on August 15, 1992, in Colwall, England. Peter Boal has three children, 1 son born in 1995, another in 1997 and a daughter born in 2000.
