= Angelica Generosa =

American ballet dancer

- Born: 1993 or 1994 (age 32–33)
- Education: School of American Ballet
- Occupation: ballet dancer
- Years active: 2011–present
- Career
- Current group: Pacific Northwest Ballet

Angelica Generosa (born 1993 or 1994) is an American ballet dancer. She joined the Pacific Northwest Ballet in 2011 and was promoted to principal dancer in 2020.

== Early life and training ==
Generosa was born to parents from the Philippines and was raised in South River, New Jersey. She started dancing at age four in multiple dance styles. Later, she spent a summer at the School of American Ballet and was invited to stay as a full-time student; thus, she started traveling between South River and New York to train. In 2009, at age fifteen, she danced the role of Liberty Bell in George Balanchine's Stars and Stripes with Taylor Stanley at the school's annual workshop, after only two weeks of rehearsals in order to replace an injured schoolmate, and her performance was praised by The New York Times. Two years later, she performed Balanchine's Allegro Brillante at the workshop. She graduated after four years of training and was awarded the Mae L. Wien Award.

== Career ==
In 2005, at age thirteen, Generosa appeared in the Radio City Christmas Spectacular as Clara.

After Generosa graduated, she was not offered an apprenticeship with the New York City Ballet. The Pacific Northwest Ballet hired her, but had her spend several months at the company's school before allowing her to join in 2011 as an apprentice; she was taken into the corps de ballet the following year. In her second year at the company, she was cast by Twyla Tharp to create a role in Waiting at the Station. She was promoted to soloist in 2016. Whilst in the corps and as soloist, she was already cast in lead roles, including Aurora in The Sleeping Beauty, Balanchine's Tarantella, "Rubies" from Jewels, Robbins' The Concert, and Fenley's 34-minute solo State of Darkness.

In 2020, she danced The Swan in Misty Copeland's fundraiser, Swans for Relief, a response to the COVID-19 pandemic's impact on the dance community, with funds going to participating dancers' companies and other related relief funds. Later that year, the Pacific Northwest Ballet announced her promotion to principal dancer during their first digital gala.
