= Sara Rudner =

American dancer, choreographer and dance educator

- Born: February 16, 1944; New York City
- Occupation(s): Dancer, choreographer

Sara Rudner (born 16 February 1944) is an American dancer, choreographer and dance educator.

== Life and career ==
Sara Rudner was born in Brooklyn, New York, and studied dance at a neighborhood music school and ballet with Bella Malinka. She graduated with a BA from Barnard College and a MFA from Bennington College. She performed with Paul Sanasardo and also other groups, and in 1965 she became a founding member and in 1966 principal dancer for Twyla Tharp's dance company, where she continued to work for twenty years. She also performed solo and collaborated other artists, including Dana Reitz, Mikhail Baryshnikov and Christopher Janney.

Rudner founded and directed the Sara Rudner Performance Ensemble, and has provided choreography for the Public Theater, the Santa Fe Opera, and the Paris Opera. She served as Director or the Dance Program at Sarah Lawrence College until 2019. Rudner continues to perform professionally to good reviews.

== Honors and awards ==
- Bessie Award
- Guggenheim Memorial Foundation Fellowship
- Dance Magazine award, 2009
- National Endowment for the Arts fellowship
- New York State Council on the Arts fellowship

== Works ==
Selected works include:

- Dancing-on-View
- Heartbeat
- 33 Dances
- Dancing-on-View: Preview/Hindsight
