= Via6 Towers =

24-story apartment buildings in the Belltown neighborhood of Seattle, Washington

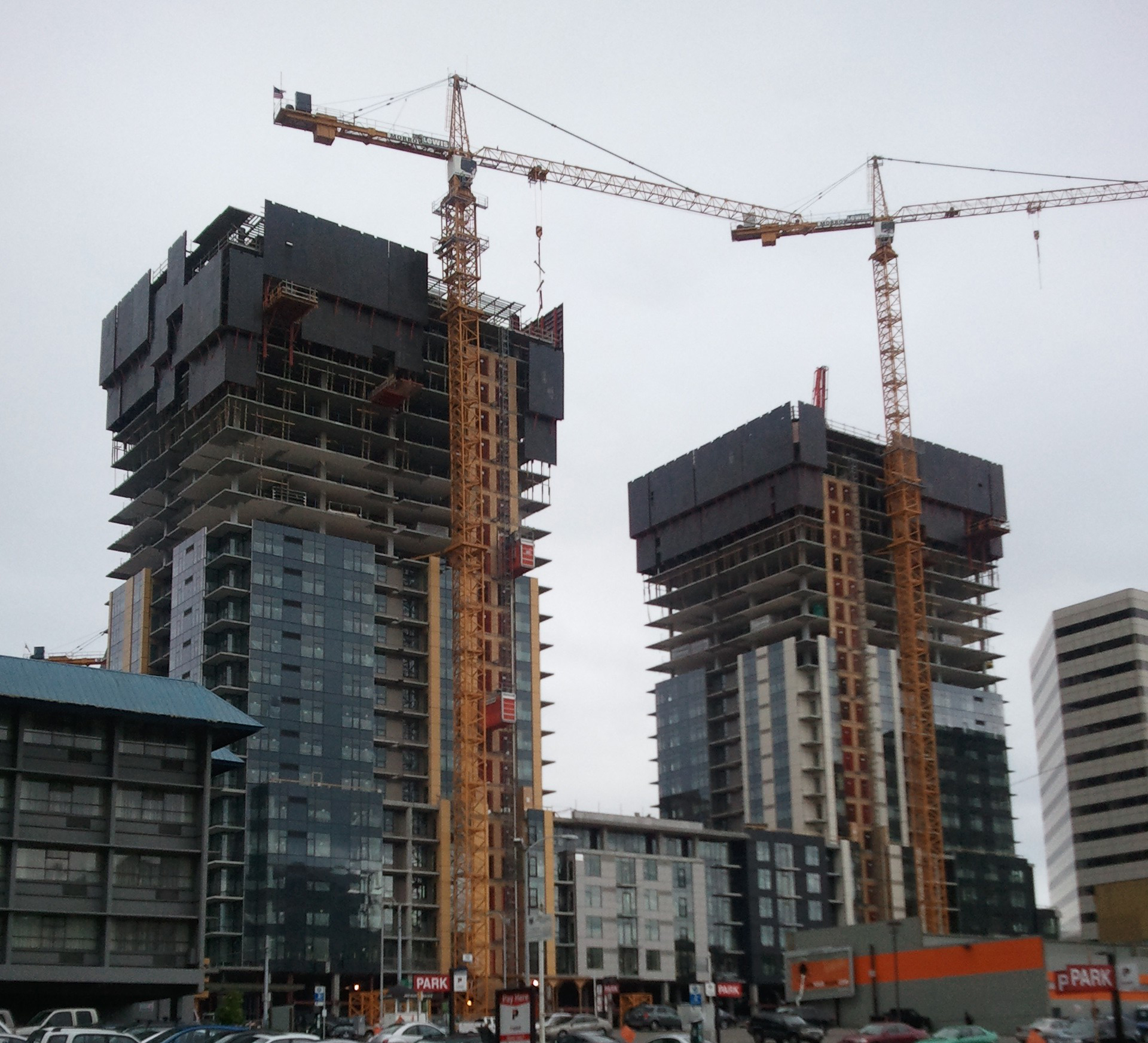
- Via6 towers under construction in 2012

- Location within downtown Seattle

General information
- Type: Apartments
- Location: 6th and Lenora; Seattle, Washington
- Coordinates: 47.6154°N 122.3406°W
- Completed: 2013
- Owner: CPP Investment Board, Multi-Employer Property Trust

Height
- Roof: 240 ft (73 m)

Technical details
- Floor count: above ground: 24 below ground: 3

Design and construction
- Architects: GGLO, Seattle
- Developer: Pine Street Group
- Structural engineer: Magnusson Klemencic Associates
- Main contractor: Lease Crutcher Lewis

References
- Pine Street Group project info

The Via6 Towers are a pair of 24-story apartment buildings in the Belltown neighborhood of Seattle, Washington. Construction began in 2011 and the building topped out in June 2012. The complex opened February 2013 and includes 18,000 square feet of retail space at street level. The building was constructed to Leed Gold standards.
