= Francia Russell =

Retired American ballet dancer

Francia Russell (born January 10, 1938) is the former co-artistic director of Pacific Northwest Ballet and former director of the Pacific Northwest Ballet School, from 1977 to 2005. She was a soloist with the New York City Ballet, where she later became ballet master. In 1975, Russell became co-artistic director of Frankfurt Ballet with her husband, Kent Stowell, and in 1977, they accepted the position of artistic directors of Pacific Northwest Ballet in Seattle, Washington. With Stowell, Russell built Pacific Northwest Ballet from a local organization to one of national and international prominence.

== Early life ==
Francia Russell was born in Los Angeles, California to Frank Russell and Marion (Whitney) Russell. She began her ballet training at San Francisco Ballet and in 1948, the Russell family moved to Europe, where she continued her training in Paris, Nice, and finally in London, with the renowned ballet instructor Vera Volkova. She has a younger sister, Marilyn Russell.

== Career ==
Russell's professional dance career began in 1956, when George Balanchine offered her a contract with the New York City Ballet; she was promoted to soloist in 1959. She retired from NYCB in 1961, danced for a year with Jerome Robbins's Ballets USA, and taught at the School of American Ballet. She attended New York University and in 1964, Balanchine convinced Russell to return to NYCB as ballet master, where she was responsible for rehearsing and teaching the company, in addition to staging Balanchine ballets worldwide.

In 1975, Russell became co-artistic director of the Frankfurt Ballet in Germany with her husband, Kent Stowell. In 1977, Russell and Stowell accepted the position of artistic directors of Pacific Northwest Ballet, with Russell becoming the director of Pacific Northwest Ballet School.

As director of the school from 1977 to 2005, Russell created a curriculum that included other dance forms and a written syllabus focused on the critical early years of classical ballet training. Educational outreach programs, in cooperation with local community organizations and schools, became part of the school's mission. In 1994, she formed DanceChance, aimed at finding and training future artists that reflect diversity within the ballet community. Hand-selected from local public schools, the program has provided the opportunity for young children to train on full scholarship at PNBS.

While at Pacific Northwest Ballet, Russell and Stowell oversaw construction of the Phelps Center and the Francia Russell Center, and renovation of McCaw Hall, venues which allowed for the expansion of PNB Company and School. Over 28 years, Stowell and Russell brought 168 ballets to the PNB repertoire, including ten full-length works, ninety world premieres by 68 choreographers, and ongoing choreography workshops.

Russell, a Balanchine Trust répétiteur, has staged over 240 productions over a span of 55 years. In addition to staging Balanchine ballets at Pacific Northwest Ballet, she has staged his works both in the United States and abroad, at Paris Opera Ballet, Bolshoi Ballet, San Francisco Ballet, Royal Danish Ballet, Bayerisches Staatsballet, Joffrey Ballet, Dutch National Ballet, Stuttgart Ballet, Frankfurt Ballet, Royal Swedish Ballet, Ballet West, Pennsylvania Ballet, Boston Ballet, Los Angeles Ballet, Hamburg Ballet, Vienna State Opera Ballet, Houston Ballet, Pittsburgh Ballet Theatre, and Oregon Ballet Theatre. In 1987, she staged the first Balanchine ballet in China, at Shanghai Ballet and in 1988, she staged the first authorized performance of Balanchine's work at the Kirov Ballet, in his birthplace of Saint Petersburg. Her stagings include some of Balanchine's most notable works: Serenade, The Four Temperaments, Allegro Brillante, Concerto Barocco, Symphony in C, A Midsummer Night's Dream, Stars and Stripes, Western Symphony, Theme and Variations, and Agon.

== Personal life ==
Russell lives in Seattle with her husband, Kent Stowell, whom she met while both were working at New York City Ballet. They have three sons, including Christopher and Ethan Stowell.

== Awards ==
- 1987: Women in Communications
- 1989: Governor's Arts Awards
- 1996: Dance Magazine Awards
- 2003: BRAVA Award
- 2003: Seattle University Honorary Doctor of Humane Letters
- 2004: ArtsFund Lifetime Achievement
- 2004: Mayor's Arts Awards
- 2010: University of Washington Honorary Doctorate of Arts
