= Petite Mort (ballet) =

Contemporary ballet choreographed by Jiří Kylián

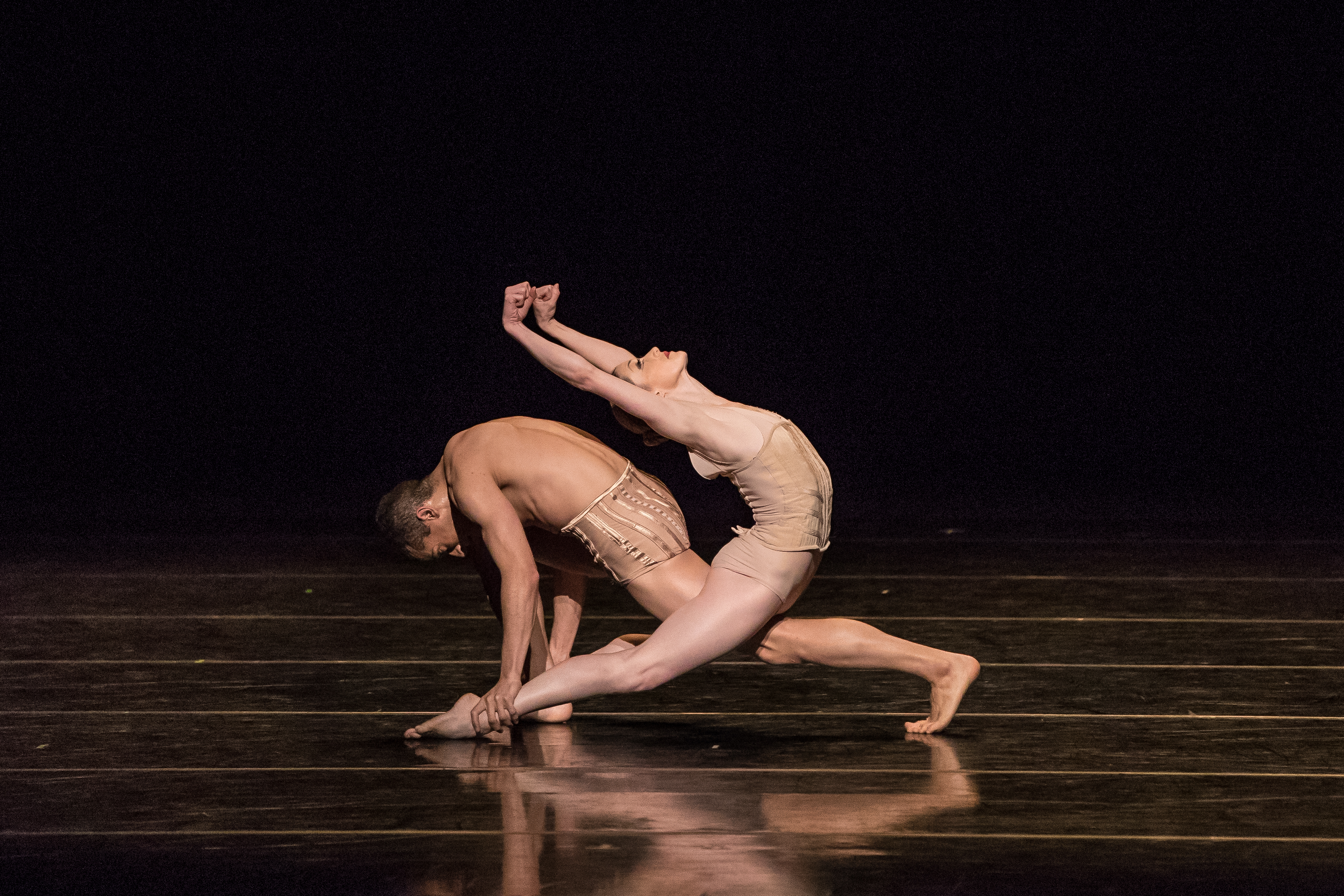
- Kansas City Ballet dancers in Petite Mort
- Choreographer: Jiří Kylián
- Music: Wolfgang Amadeus Mozart
- Premiere: 23 August 1991; Großes Festspielhaus, Salzburg
- Original ballet company: Nederlands Dans Theater
- Design: Jiří Kylián; Joke Visser; Joop Caboort
- Genre: contemporary ballet

Petite Mort is a contemporary ballet choreographed by Jiří Kylián to music by Wolfgang Amadeus Mozart. The ballet is danced by a cast of twelve, alternating between duets and group sequences. The ballet was created for the Salzburg Festival, in commemoration of the bicentenary of Mozart's death. It premiered on 23 August 1991, at the Großes Festspielhaus.

== Choreography and analysis ==
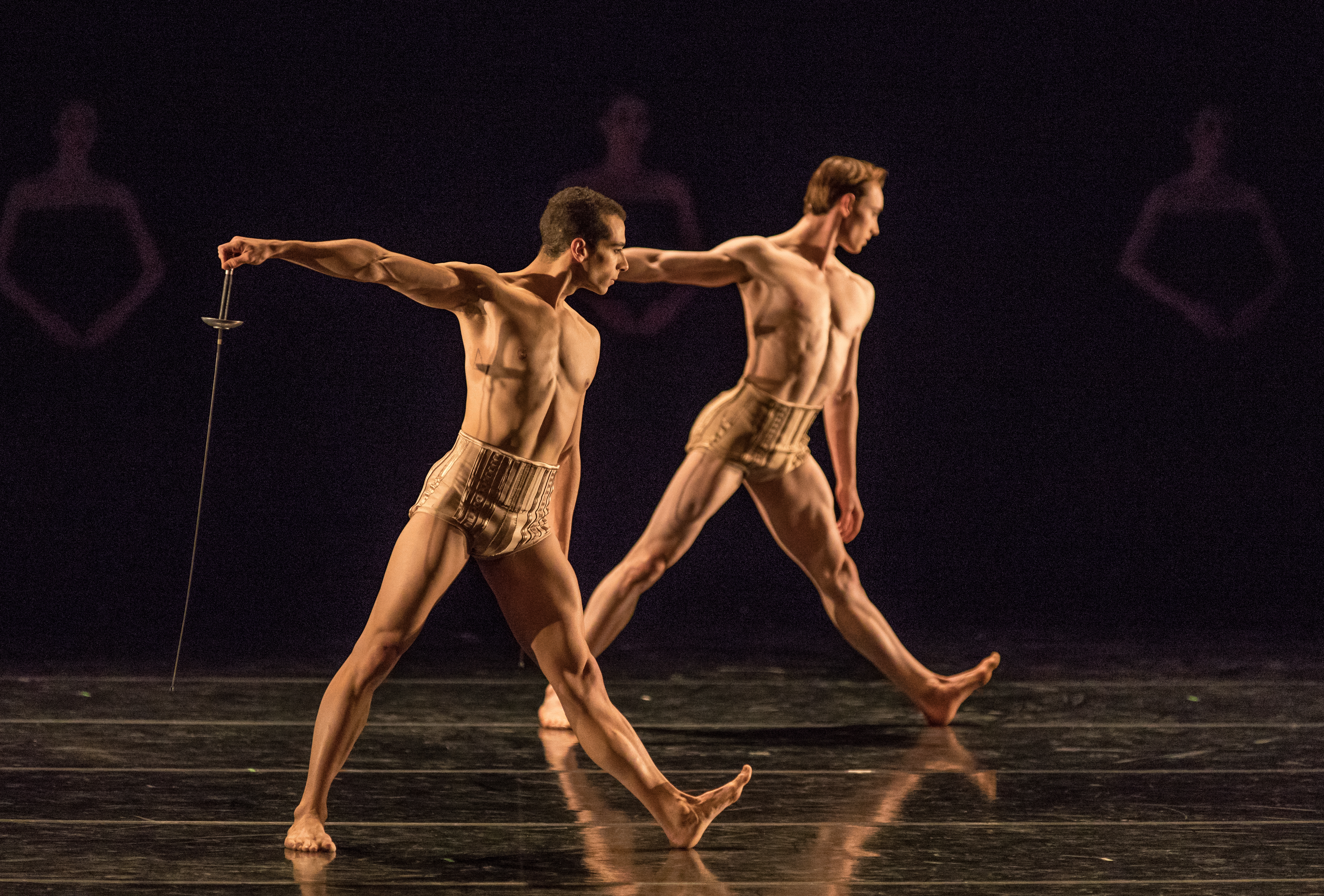
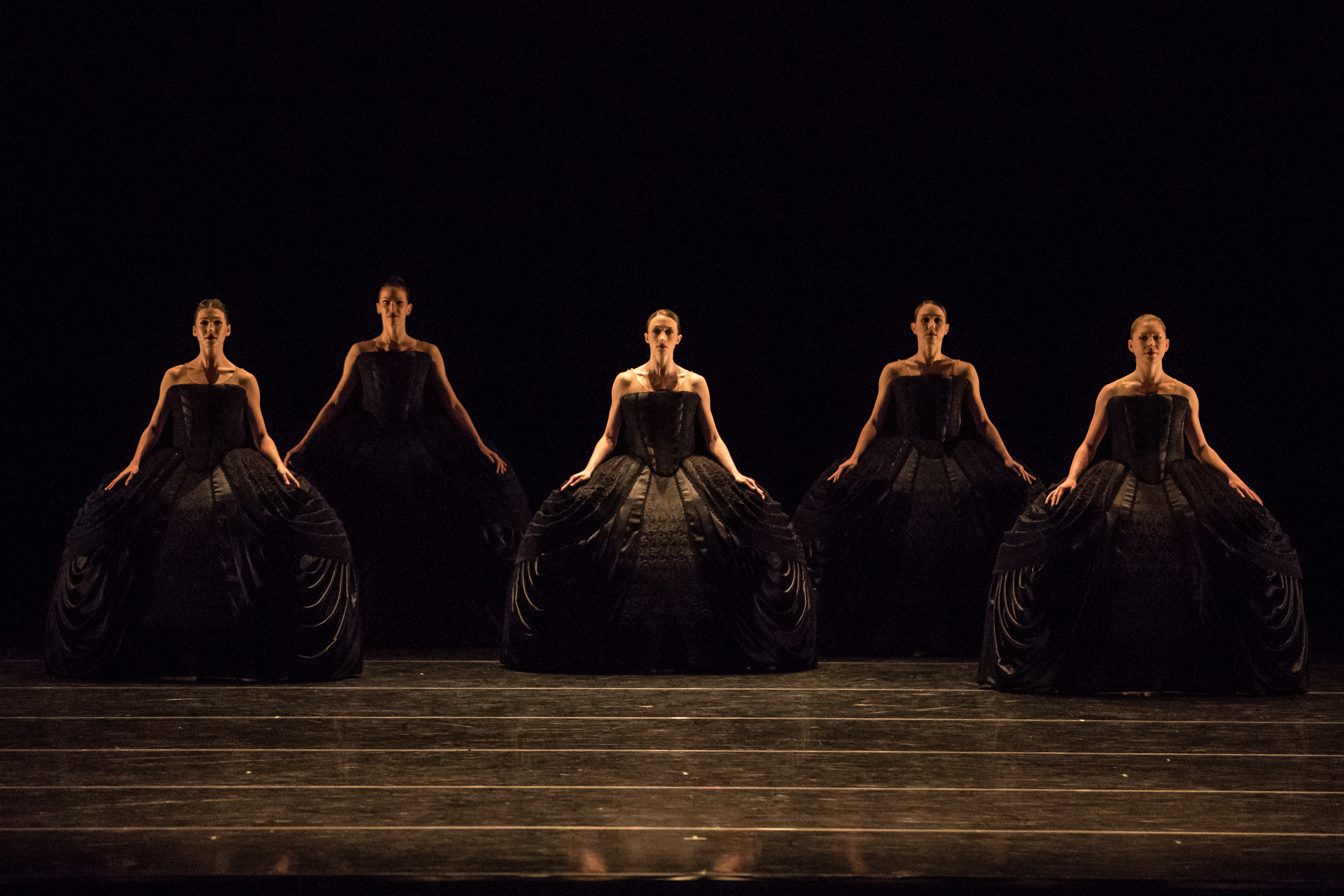
Petite Mort features fencing foils and rococo dresses (pictured: Kansas City Ballet dancers)

The French title of Petite Mort refers to "little death", a euphemism for orgasm. The ballet is set to the Adagio from Piano Concerto No. 23 and Andante from Piano Concerto No. 21, both slow movements from two of Mozart's most popular piano concertos, contrasting with the physicality of the choreography. Kylián explained, "This deliberate choice should not be seen as a provocation or thoughtlessness – rather as my way to acknowledge the fact that I am living and working as part of a world where nothing is sacred, where brutality and arbitrariness are commonplace."

The ballet is performed by six men and six women, dancing barefooted. The women are dressed in leotards, and the men in shorts and barechested, all in skin colours and with corset lining. Dance scholar Katja Vaghi noted these costumes "clearly enhance the dance’s sensuality, already hinted at in the title. They add to the general impression of witnessing something private, not allowed to the public eye." In parts of the ballet, the women also wear black rococo dresses that are rigid structures on wheeled platforms. Six fencing foils are used as props in the ballet.

The ballet features both group sequences and short duets. Author Zoe Anderson suggested the ballet "has a focus on sexual politics." New York Times dance critic Jack Anderson wrote, "The assertive choreography often treats the battle of the sexes as a duel", while moments where the women wear the long dresses "serve as reminders of decorum. These dresses are only frames; the women easily step out of them, and the dueling resumes." Jennifer Dunning, also a critic at the New York Times, commented, "Petite Mort moved its dancers and the dresses in stylishly ordered ranks and might even have been making a comment about male warriors and the gutsy women beneath those incapacitating gowns."

Vaghi, in analysing recurring allusions to baroque in Kylián's works, noted that in Petite Mort, such references "are mostly seen in elements that are visible and audible onstage, such as costumes and music, and are less evident in the structure." These references are evident in the use of fencing foils and lighting designs inspired by baroque painter Caravaggio's use of chiaroscuro. She noted that the costumes are not literally baroque, as they are too tight for undergarments at that period, and instead "qualify as a contemporary reworking with a touch of nostalgia that appeals to today's eyes ... The costumes link this reworking of the past to sensuality and eroticism."

== Development and performances ==
Jiří Kylián, the artistic director of the Nederlands Dans Theater (NDT), choreographed Petite Mort for the Salzburg Festival in 1991, in commemoration of the bicentenary of Mozart's death, with twelve dancers from NDT I, the main company. Kylián designed the decor and lighting, the latter realised by Joop Caboort. The costume was designed by NDT head of the costume department Joke Visser, who had designed nearly all of the costumes for Kylián's works since 1989.

Petite Mort premiered on 23 August 1991, at the Großes Festspielhaus. Beginning in the mid-1990s, Petite Mort is performed in one evening with five other Kylián works, Six Dances, No More Play (both 1988), Falling Angels (1989), Sweet Dreams and Sarabande (both 1990), together known as the Black and White series, named for the colour of the costumes. Motifs in the programme include 18th-century music, baroque dresses and the use of fencing foils as props.

Petite Mort is in the repertory of many dance troupes, including the American Ballet Theatre, English National Ballet, National Ballet of Canada, Australian Ballet, Les Ballets de Monte-Carlo, Pacific Northwest Ballet, Washington Ballet, Philadelphia Ballet (formerly Pennsylvania Ballet), Kansas City Ballet, Alvin Ailey American Dance Theater, Rambert Dance Company, and Hubbard Street Dance Chicago.

== Original cast ==
- Elke Schepers
- Jorma Elo
- Lorraine Blouin
- Nancy Euverink
- Davide Luca
- Martino Müller
- Sol León
- Cora Kroese
- Paul Lightfoot
- Johan Inger
- Jennifer Hanna
- Bruce Michelson
