= West Side Story Suite =

Ballet choreographed by Jerome Robbins

- Choreographer: Jerome Robbins
- Music: Leonard Bernstein
- Premiere: May 18, 1995; New York State Theater
- Original ballet company: New York City Ballet
- Design: Irene Sharaff; Oliver Smith; Jennifer Tipton

West Side Story Suite is a ballet suite choreographed by Jerome Robbins. Robbins conceived, directed and choreographed the 1957 musical West Side Story, then co-directed its 1961 film adaptation, before including parts of the choreography in the anthology Jerome Robbins' Broadway. Robbins developed the latter to the ballet West Side Story Suite for the New York City Ballet, which premiered on May 18, 1995, at the New York State Theater.

== Background ==
Jerome Robbins was credited for conceiving, directing and choreographing the 1957 Broadway musical West Side Story, with music by Leonard Bernstein, lyrics by Stephen Sondheim and book by Arthur Laurents, inspired by William Shakespeare's Romeo and Juliet, set in 1950s New York. In the 1961 film adaptation, he co-directed with Robert Wise. He incorporated the choreography to the 1989 anthology Jerome Robbins' Broadway, which is slightly rechoreographed from the original musical.

== Production ==
In the 1970s, Robbins was invited to make a West Side Story ballet for the American Ballet Theatre. After learning this, George Balanchine encouraged Robbins to accept the offer because "our boys can't fight," though the plan fell through. In 1994, Lincoln Kirstein, a New York City Ballet co-founder, wrote to Robbins and suggested he make a West Side Story as "a choral ballet" because "not only would it be a terrific boost for the company which needs a new Sleeping Beauty, but it would put us in a more stable condition, for continuity." Comparing to The Royal Ballet's Romeo and Juliet, he claimed if the New York City Ballet has a West Side Story ballet, he "would not feel so desperately worried about our repertory and the ageing of our audience."

Robbins claimed that when he choreographed the musical, he did not expect it to be performed as a ballet because ballet dancers "couldn't dance it then," but by the time he made the ballet, "They can jive as well as anybody else can jive, so they can move their bodies in all those different ways. They just have to push the right buttons and release them." The ballet is developed from six excerpts from Robbins' anthology Jerome Robbins' Broadway, and he added "Something's Coming". Peter Gennaro, the co-choreographer of the original musical, was credited as such in the ballet. Since the dancers had no prior acting experience, Robbins had them create biographies for their characters. In rehearsals, Robbins claimed that the dancers were "holding back", so he told them, "Look. Each of you has your own story. You can't just be nice people then scream and yell."

In the original production, guest performers Nancy Ticotin and Natalie Toro were brought in to portray Anita and Rosalia respectively, both singing parts. Danish dancer Nikolaj Hübbe, who played Riff, was able to sing "Cool" himself despite his lack of vocal training. Robert La Fosse, a New York City Ballet dancer who played Tony on Jerome Robbins' Broadway, reprised his role here, though the character's part in "Something's Coming" is performed by a singer in the orchestra pit, as with three chorus girls in "America" and the female solo in "Somewhere". Robbins was concerned that he might need to adapt the songs "because the dancers were not trained for it," but he did not.

Irene Sharaff designed the costumes for the ballet, having previously worked on both the musical and the film. Oliver Smith and Jennifer Tipton designed the sets and lighting respectively.

== Original cast ==
- Robert La Fosse as Tony
- Elena Diner as Maria
- Jock Soto as Bernardo
- Nikolaj Hübbe as Riff
- Nancy Ticotin as Anita
- Natalie Toro as Rosalia

The offstage singers were Rob Lorey, Joan Barber, Stephanie Bast, Donna Lee Marshall and Karen Murphy, with Paul Gemignani conducting.

== Musical numbers ==
- "Prologue"
- "Something's Coming"
- "The Dance at the Gym"
- "America"
- "Cool"
- "The Rumble"
- "Somewhere"

The ballet starts with a spoken introduction, and to emphasize the suite form, there are bows between songs.

== Revivals ==
A few years after West Side Story Suite premiered, the New York City Ballet chose to cast their own dancers instead of Broadway actors to perform the singing roles, though the format of having offstage vocalists continues.

In 2005, when original cast member Jock Soto retired from dancing, he included the "Dance at the Gym" scene in his final performance. Nikolaj Hübbe, another original cast member, performed "Cool" in his farewell performance in 2008. Chita Rivera, who created the role of Anita in the musical, served as the MC at a New York City Ballet gala in 2011 where West Side Story Suite was performed.

When ballet companies add West Side Story Suite to their repertory, they must seek permissions from lyricist Stephen Sondheim, book writer Arthur Laurent, and the estates of Robbins and composer Leonard Bernstein, therefore the companies are required to hold singing auditions. In 2007, the National Ballet of Canada became the first company other than the New York City Ballet to perform West Side Story Suite, and according to artistic director Karen Kain, the company acquired the ballet in honour of the tenth anniversary of Robbins' death. A vocal coach was brought in to assess whether the company could perform the ballet in terms of singing, help cast performers for the three singing roles, and give the cast vocal training. As a result, the cast featured dancers across ranks. The San Francisco Ballet, Pacific Northwest Ballet and Houston Ballet have also performed the ballet.
