= Pacific Northwest Ballet =

Ballet company of Seattle, USA

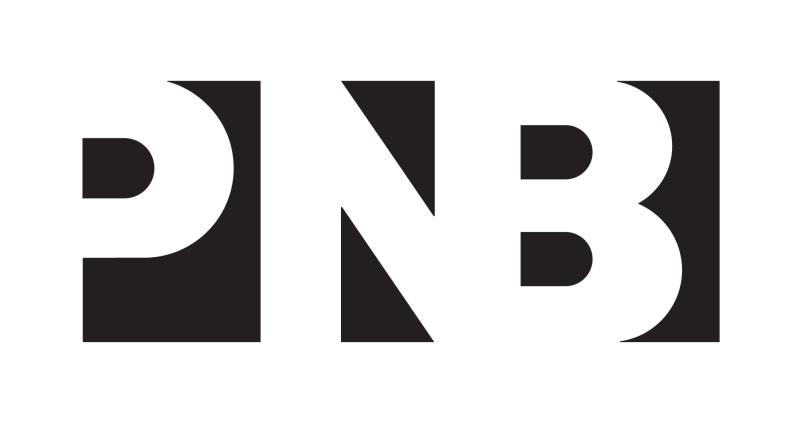

General information
- Name: Pacific Northwest Ballet
- Previous names: Pacific Northwest Dance Association
- Year founded: 1972; 54 years ago
- Founders: Kent Stowell; Francia Russell
- Principal venue: Marion Oliver McCaw Hall
- Website: pnb.org

Artistic staff
- Artistic director: Peter Boal
- Music director: Emil de Cou

Other
- Orchestra: Pacific Northwest Ballet Orchestra
- Official school: Pacific Northwest Ballet School
- Associated schools: Royal Danish Ballet; Canada's National Ballet School

Pacific Northwest Ballet (PNB) is an American ballet company based in Seattle, Washington. It is said to have the highest per capita attendance in the United States, with 11,000 subscribers in 2004. The company consists of 49 dancers and hosts more than 100 performances throughout the year; it is especially known for its performance of the Stowell/Maurice Sendak Nutcracker, which it presented from 1983 through 2014 and produced as a feature film in 1986.

In 2006, the company was chosen to perform at the Jacob's Pillow Dance Festival and New York City Center's Fall for Dance Festival.

PNB performs at Marion Oliver McCaw Hall in the Seattle Center.

== History ==
Pacific Northwest Ballet was founded in 1972 following the two-month residency of the First Chamber Dance Company, as part of Seattle Opera and named the Pacific Northwest Dance Association. Under the directorship of Kent Stowell and Francia Russell, originally of New York City Ballet, it broke away from the Opera in 1977 and took its current name in 1978. Stowell and Russell left at the end of the 2004–2005 season. A portrait by artist Michele Rushworth was painted of Stowell and Russell and installed in the Phelps Center, Seattle, to commemorate their careers and retirement. Both had studied with and danced for George Balanchine.

In July 2005, Peter Boal succeeded Stowell and Russell as artistic director following their retirement. After dancing with the New York City Ballet for 22 years, he had been a full-time faculty member at The School of American Ballet from 1995-2005.

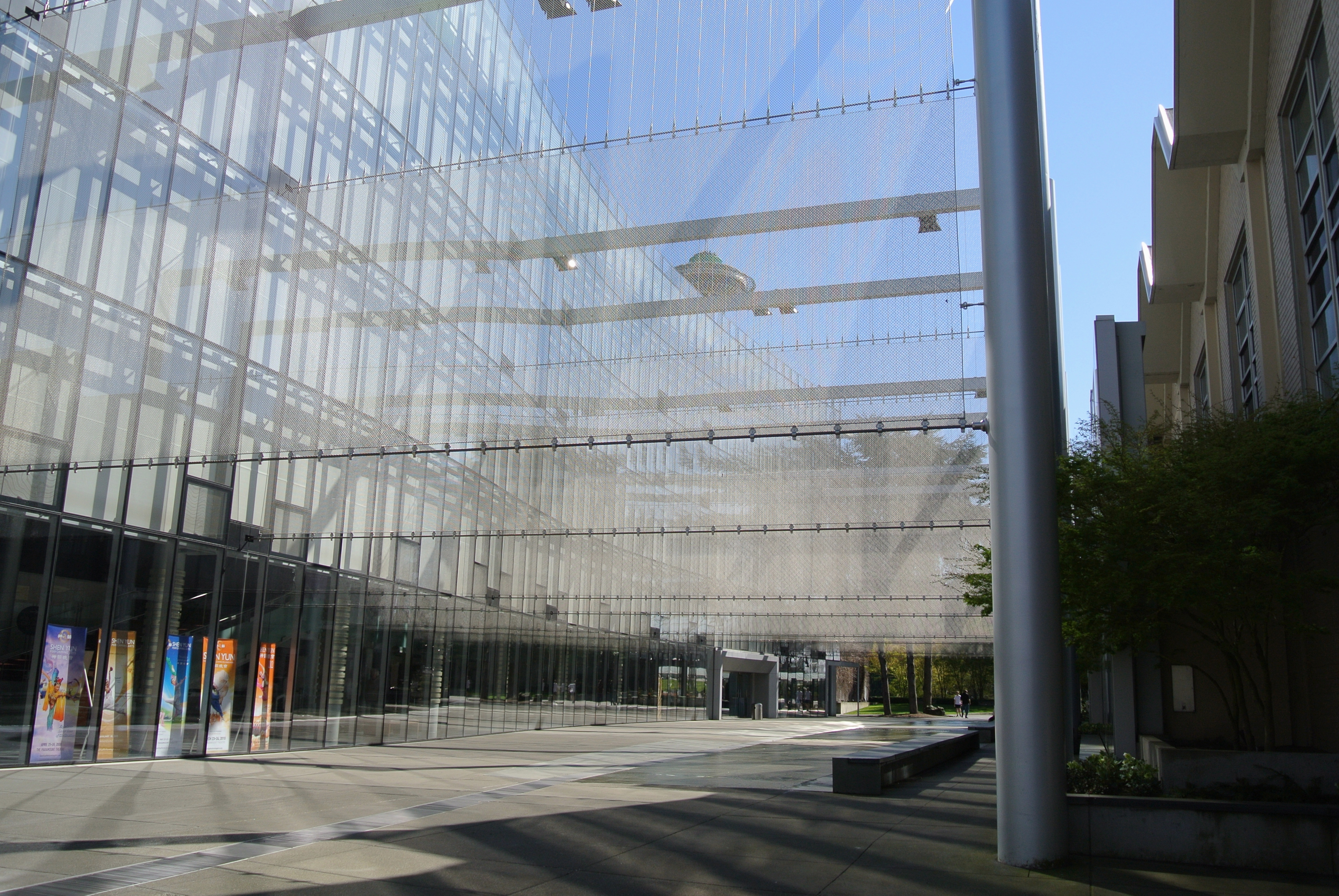
McCaw Hall, PNB's principal venue

In 2013, the company and its orchestra toured to New York for the first time in sixteen years. The New York Times dance critic Alastair Macaulay, stated of their presentation that "This is a true company," more "unified in its understanding of Balanchine" than the New York City Ballet.

In 2012, PNB brought in Twyla Tharp as its first artist in residence for a year-long residency.

== Pacific Northwest Ballet School ==
The Pacific Northwest Ballet School was founded in 1974. Formerly directed by Francia Russell, and now directed by Peter Boal, it has been considered to be "one of the leading, if not the definitive, professional training school in the country." The teaching is structured on that of the School of American Ballet. Pacific Northwest Ballet holds an annual summer course in the month of July and is considered one of the leading summer dance education facilities in the country.

== Dancers ==
Pacific Northwest Ballet is noted for choosing dancers that have physique, expressivity and a variety of body shapes.

=== Principals ===
Name	Nationality	Training	Joined PNB	Promoted to Principal	Other companies (incl. guest performances)
Jonathan Batista		English National Ballet	2021	2022	Boston Ballet; Cincinnati Ballet; Oklahoma City Ballet
Leta Biasucci		Central Pennsylvania Youth Ballet; San Francisco Ballet School	2011	2018	Oregon Ballet Theater
Kyle Davis		Makaroff School of Ballet; Rock School for Dance Education; North Carolina School of the Arts; Pacific Northwest Ballet School	2009	2020	
Angelica Generosa		School of American Ballet; Princeton Ballet	2012	2020	
Cecilia Iliesiu		School of American Ballet; Studio Maestro	2015	2022	Carolina Ballet
Elle Macy		Orange County Dance Center; Pacific Northwest Ballet School	2013	2021	
Elizabeth Murphy		Academy of Ballet Arts; Rock School for Dance Education	2011	2015	Pennsylvania Ballet; Ballet West II; Ballet West
Lucien Postlewaite		School of American Ballet; Pacific Northwest Ballet School	2004	2008, 2017	Les Ballets de Monte-Carlo
Sarah-Gabrielle Ryan		Rock School for Dance Education; Metropolitan Ballet Academy; School of Pennsylvania Ballet	2017	2023	Pennsylvania Ballet
Dylan Wald		Minnesota Dance Theatre; The Dance Institute; Pacific Northwest Ballet School	2015	2020	

=== Soloists ===
Name	Nationality	Training	Joined PNB	Promoted to Soloist
Madison Rayn Abeo		Cornish Preparatory Dance Program; Pacific Northwest Ballet School	2017	2022
Luther Demyer		Indianapolis School of Ballet; Pacific Northwest Ballet; Miami City Ballet School	2019	2024
Dammiel Cruz-Garrido		School of American Ballet; Pacific Northwest Ballet	2016	2022
Christopher D'Ariano		School of American Ballet; Pacific Northwest Ballet School	2017	2022
Clara Ruf Maldonado		School of American Ballet	2018	2023
Amanda Morgan		Dance Theatre Northwest; Pacific Northwest Ballet School	2017	2022
Miles Pertl		Pacific Northwest Ballet School; International Ballet Academy; John Cranko Schule	2015	2021
Christian Poppe		Pacific Northwest Ballet School; Cornish College of the Arts Preparatory Dance; Dance School in Everett; Johnson and Peter's Tap Dance; Ballet Bellevue; Betty Spooner's Creative Arts Foundation	2014	2022
Kuu Sakuragi		Pacific Northwest Ballet School	2020	2023
Price Suddarth		Central Indiana Dance Ensemble; School of American Ballet; Pacific Northwest Ballet School	2011	2018
Leah Terada		Dallas Metropolitan Ballet School of American Ballet	2015	2022

=== Corps de ballet ===
- Luca Anaya
- Malena Ani
- Emerson Boll
- Dylan Calahan
- Ryan Cardea
- Mark Cuddihee
- Ashton Edwards
- Melisa Guilliams
- Connor Horton
- Zsilas Michael Hughes
- Rosalyn Hutsell
- Kali Kleiman
- Larry Lancaster
- Audrey Malek
- Noah Martzall
- Joh Morrill
- Ginabel Peterson
- Samuel Portillo
- Juliet Prine
- Yuki Takahashi
- Genevieve Waldorf
- Lily Wills
- Destiny Wimpye

== Notable former dancers ==
- Rachael Bade
- Patricia Barker
- Maria Chapman
- Karel Cruz
- Brent Davi
- Lindsi Dec
- Chalnessa Eames
- Laura Gilbreath
- Carrie Imler
- Carla Körbes
- Stanko Milov
- Louise Nadeau
- Kaori Nakamura
- Noelani Pantastico
- Lesley Rausch
- Julie Tobiason
- Miranda Weese
