= Dance Magazine's "25 to Watch" =

Dance Magazine's "25 to Watch" is an annual list published by Dance Magazine of leading young dancers and choreographers, as well as new dance companies and trends in dance. The list is printed in the January issue of the magazine each year.

== 2024 ==
"25 to Watch" for 2024:

- Clarissa Rivera Dyas
- Danielle Swatzie
- Grace Rookstool
- Erina Ueda
- Donovan Reed
- Kaitlyn Sardin
- Jake Roxander
- Jindallae Bernard
- Kia Smith
- Hohyun Kang
- Karla Puno Garcia
- Kuu Sakuragi
- Sydnie L. Mosley
- Laila J. Franklin
- Lucy Fandel
- Miguel Alejandro Castillo
- Naomi Funaki
- Olivia Bell
- Pauline Casiño
- Rafael Ramírez
- Yuval Cohen
- Sean Lew
- Solal Mariotte
- Kamala Saara
- Water Street Dance Milwaukee

== 2023 ==
"25 to Watch" for 2023:

- Dandara Veiga
- Cameron Catazaro
- Guillaume Diop
- Adelaide Clauss
- Andrew McShea
- Ishida Dance Company
- Mac Twining
- Amanda Castro
- Águeda Saavedra
- Vidya Patel
- Ashton Edwards
- Quinn Starner
- Elijah Richardson
- Dominic Moore-Dunson
- Becca Robinson
- Tendayi Kuumba
- Mikaela Santos
- Simone Acri
- Elwince Magbitang
- Erin Casale
- Gianna “Gigi” Todisco
- Jordan Demetrius Lloyd
- Musa Motha
- Madeline Maxine Gorman
- STL Rhythm Collaborative

== 2022 ==
"25 to Watch" for 2022:

- Ogemdi Ude
- Adriana Pierce
- Ballet22
- Christina Carminucci
- Courtney Nitting
- Maxfield Haynes
- Adriana Wagenveld
- Imre and Marne van Opstal
- Arielle Smith
- Sienna Lalau
- Bo Park
- Ashley Green
- Carter Williams
- Ilya Vidrin and Jessi Stegall
- PARA.MAR Dance Theatre
- Baye & Asa
- Sierra Armstrong
- Brianna Mims
- Simone Stevens
- Darvensky Louis
- Johnathon Hart
- Joya Jackson
- Darian Kane
- Mthuthuzeli November
- Genevieve Penn Nabity

== 2021 ==
"25 to Watch" for 2021:

- Keerati Jinakunwiphat
- Laura Morton
- Aaron Samuel Davis
- Vincenzo Di Primo
- Bianca Scudamore
- Amanda Morgan
- Gaby Diaz
- Rohan Bhargava
- Raianna Brown
- Leonardo Sandoval
- Boston Dance Theater
- Sorah Yang
- Project Home
- Rebecca Margolick
- Rhodnie Désir
- Paula Comitre
- Christine Flores
- Khoudia Touré
- DeMarco Sleeper
- Oona Doherty
- Kennedy Brown
- Melanie Greene and J. Bouey
- Yesenia Ayala
- Nia-Amina Minor
- Maria Coelho

== 2020 ==
"25 to Watch" for 2020:

- Gabrielle Hamilton
- LED
- Maya Taylor
- Luke Hickey
- Annie Morgan
- Ashley Yergens
- Abdiel Figueroa Reyes
- Jay Carlon
- Hannah Garner
- Joseph Sissens
- Luis Beltran
- Joyce Edwards
- Zenon Zubyk
- Julie Crothers
- Lizzie Tripp
- Tatiana Desardouin
- Tommie Kesten
- Zimmi Coker
- Mira Nadon
- Khalia Campbell
- Maya Man
- Kara Chan
- Tobias Praetorius
- Airi Igarashi
- Oluwadamilare "Dare" Ayorinde

== 2019 ==
"25 to Watch" for 2019:

- Evan Ruggiero
- Siphesihle November
- Sophie Miklosovic
- Micaela Taylor
- Aran Bell
- Nic Gareiss
- Chisako Oga
- Maria Khoreva
- Roman Mejia
- Benjamin Freemantle
- Pioneer Winter Collective
- Wubkje Kuindersma
- Adeene Denton
- Tanya Chianese
- Jessica He
- Joshua Culbreath
- Jasmine Harper
- Sydney Dolan
- Cristina Hall
- Shamar Wayne Watt
- Paul Morland
- Easton Payne
- Hadar Ahuvia
- Matty Davis
- Stephanie Troyak

== 2018 ==
"25 to Watch" for 2018:

- Eduardo Guerrero
- Angelo Greco
- Alanna Morris-Van Tassel
- Erica Lall
- Alston Macgill
- Raven Barkley
- Leal Zielińska
- Kelsey McCowan & Caley Carr
- Annie Arnoult
- slowdanger
- Cesar Corrales
- May Nagahisa
- Connie Shiau
- MK Abadoo
- Sam Pinkleton
- Daina Ashbee
- Mackenzie Richter
- Marcelino Sambé
- Maine Kawashima
- Yeman Brown
- Kate Ladenheim
- Jacob Jonas
- Kolton Krouse
- Jeroboam Bozeman
- Alice Klock

== 2017 ==
"25 to Watch" for 2017:

- Unity Phelan
- Shimon Ito
- Amanda DeVenuta
- Jeffery Duffy
- Chun Wai Chan
- Paige Fraser
- Parris Goebel
- Elise Cowin
- Kayla Collymore
- Elizabeth Wallace
- Omari Mizrahi
- Jess LeProtto
- Karissa Royster
- Reed Tankersley
- Chitra Vairavan
- Mario Bermudez Gil
- Zhiyao Zhang
- Marc Crousillat
- Martha Nichols
- Sirui Liu
- Sarah Lapointe
- Meg Foley
- Ching Ching Wong
- Charlotte Edmonds
- Margarita Shrainer

== 2016 ==
"25 to Watch" for 2016:

- Jovani Furlan
- Cora Cliburn
- Kaleen Miller
- Francesco Gabriele Frola
- Miriam Miller
- Renata Shakirova
- Sterling Baca
- Katarzyna Skarpetowska
- Alex Sanchez
- Jim Nowakowski
- Shahar Dori
- Myles Thatcher
- Janelle Figgins
- Caitlin Cucchiara
- Jacquelin Harris
- Litebulb
- Caitlin Trainor
- Norbert De La Cruz III
- Tamisha Guy
- Léonore Baulac
- Kiara Flder
- MADBOOTS DANCE
- Hiroki Ichinose
- Michelle Veintimilla
- Nayara Lopes

== 2015 ==
"25 to Watch" for 2015:

- Emilie Leriche
- Andrew Bartee
- Silas Farley
- Jaclyn Walsh
- Alyssa Mann
- Kate Wallich
- Tale Dolven
- Chyrstyn Fentroy
- Shiori Kase
- Osnel Delgado
- Joshua L. Peugh
- Visceral Dance Chicago
- Ana Turazashvili
- Skylar Campbell
- François Alu
- Stephanie Williams
- Danica Paulos
- Indya Childs
- Ida Praetorius
- Ryan P Casey
- Robyn Mineko Williams
- Stuart Singer
- Jay Armstrong Johnson
- Danielle Agami

== 2014 ==
"25 to Watch" for 2014:

- Sep Hye Han
- The Nexus Project
- Ryan Steelee
- Heath Gill
- Danielle Hammer
- Tomomi Morimoto
- Megan Zimny Kaftira
- Javier Ninja
- Demi Remick
- Laura Gutierrez
- Travis Walker
- Christy Funsch
- Da' Von Doane
- Chelsea Adomaitis
- Dylan Gutierrez
- Melissa Toogood
- Jennifer Lauren
- Nic Lincoln
- Kristina Kretova
- Indiana Woodward
- Yoshiaki Nakano
- Demetia Hopkins
- Calvin Royal III
- Mary Ann Bradley
- Derek Dunn

== 2013 ==
"25 to Watch" for 2013:

- Emily Kikta
- Johnny McMillan
- Michael Montgomery
- Frederick (Pete) Leo Walker II
- Olga Smirnova
- Kayla Rowser
- Victor Alexander
- Rashaun Mitchell and Silas Riener
- Cassandra Trenary
- Claire Calvert
- Juel D. Lane
- Alan Obuzor
- Melinda Sullivan
- Nozomi Iijima
- Monica Cervantes
- Ida Saki
- Jonathan Royse Windham
- Amanda Cochrane
- BODYTRAFFIC
- Leta Biasucci
- Ballet BC
- Bryan Strimpel
- Gregory Haney
- The Playground
- Frances Chiaverini

== 2012 ==
"25 to Watch" for 2012:

- Ana Lopez
- Caleb Teicher
- Keenan Kampa
- Yonah Acosta
- August Wilson Center Dance Ensemble
- Kleber Rebello
- Courtney D. Jones
- Anna Tikhomirova
- Micah Moch
- tEEth
- Courtney Muscroft
- Danielle Rowe
- Tzveta Kassabova
- Marlon Taylor-Wiles
- Brooklyn Mack
- Katherine Williams
- Lil Buck
- Carrie Hanson
- Price Suddarth
- Beth Gill
- Zack Tang
- Rachel Van Buskirk
- Taylor Stanley
- Eun Jung Choi
- Gustavo Ramírez Sansano

== 2011 ==
"25 to Watch" for 2011:

- Jerome Tisserand
- Roberto Cisneros
- Isaac Akiba
- Renan Cerdeiro
- Leann Underwood
- Whitney Huell
- Julianne Kepley
- Brittany Pollack
- Melissa Hamilton
- Allison Miller
- Adam Hougland
- Olivier Wevers
- Robert Dekkers
- Yannick Lebrun
- Ryoji Sasamoto
- Ahmed Khemis
- Nikki Zialcita
- Troy Ogilvie
- Emily Schoen
- Jonathan Fredrickson
- Huang Yi
- luciana achugar
- Alexandria "Brinae Ali" Bradley
- Teddy Forance
- Nick Kenkel

== 2010 ==
"25 to Watch" for 2010:

- Robert Fairchild
- Julia Rhoads
- Adrienne Benz
- Maeghan McHale
- Lloyd Knight
- Isaac Hernández
- Sheryl Murakami
- Company C Contemporary Ballet
- Irina Tsikurishvili
- Claudia Rahardjanoto
- Ekaterina Krysanova
- Nelly van Bommel
- Iyar Elezra
- Alex Wong
- Jessika Muns
- Pearlann Porter
- Aparna Ramaswamy
- William Wingfield
- Rumpus Room
- Emily Proctor
- Caine Keenan
- Eric Tamm
- Sean Dorsey
- Judith Sanchez Ruiz
- Whitney Jensen

== 2009 ==
"25 to Watch" for 2009:

- Ballet Nouveau Colorado
- Melissa Thomas
- Leslie Kraus (of Kate Weare Company)
- Sarah Reynolds
- Edwin Aparicio
- Manuelito Biag
- Rachel Piskin
- Kyle Abraham
- Sonya Tayeh
- Ricardo Zayas
- Francisco Graciano
- Kiesha Lalama-White
- Andrea Miller / Gallim Dance
- Jessica Tong
- Sarah Reich
- Christopher Vo
- Megan Quiroz
- Kara Wilkes
- Seth Stewart
- Marideth Wanat
- Jessica Collado
- Lux Boreal
- Ginger Smith
- Eric Underwood
- Rachel Foster

== 2008 ==
"25 to Watch" for 2008:

- Sarawanee Tanatanit
- Kinodance Company
- Cedar Lake Contemporary Ballet
- Dawn Dipple
- Lorraine Chapman
- Kendrick Jones
- Tyler Angle
- Natalie Cortez
- Exhale Dance Tribe
- Mathew Janczewski and Arena Dances
- Michela Marino Lerman
- Diana Albrecht
- Charles O. Anderson and Dance Theatre X
- Carolyn Rose Ramsay
- Penny Saunders
- Ekaterina Kondaurova
- Sharna Fabiano
- Kumiko Tsuji
- Celestina
- Noah Racey
- Mara Vinson
- Ivan Vasiliev
- Chase Johnsey
- Faye Driscoll
- Shinichi Iova-Koga

== 2007 ==
"25 to Watch" for 2007:

- Dawn Fay
- Meisha Bosma
- Columbus Movement Movement (cm2)
- Natalia Osipova
- Kenta Shimizu
- Grease on Reality TV
- Attack Theatre
- Webdance (dance videos on the internet)
- Tiit Helimets
- Vivian Nixon
- Ephrat Asherie
- Nelida Tirado
- Holly Johnston
- Zane Booker
- Peng-Yu Chen
- Peggy Dolkas
- The Jacqueline Kennedy Onassis School at ABT
- Chris Elam: Misnomer Dance Theater
- Helen Pickett
- Sean Patrick Mahoney
- Lauri Stallings
- Rulan Tangen
- Max Pollak
- Jamar Roberts
- Melody Herrera

== 2006 ==
"25 to Watch" for 2006:

- "Cricket" (James P. Colter)
- Anouk van Dijk
- Caitlin Valentine
- Kurt Douglas
- Tania Isaac
- Aesha Ash
- Ma Cong
- Navarrete x Kajiyama Dance Theater
- Edwaard Liang
- Ballet Pacifica
- Josie Walsh
- Carla Körbes
- Lisa Benson
- Dance Camera West Film Festival
- Hee Seo
- Mariko Kida
- Leticia Oliveira
- Jonah Bokaer
- Isaac Spencer
- Misa Kuranaga
- Miguel Gutierrez
- Yevgenia Obraztsova
- Amar Ramasar
- This Woman's Work
- Kazu Kumagai

== 2005 ==
"25 to Watch" for 2005:

- Fang-Yi Sheu
- Danny Tidwell
- Avichai Scher
- Uri Sands
- Szabolcs Varga
- Maria Gillespie
- Nancy Lemenager
- Nutnaree Pipit-Suksan
- Yoon-Jeong Jin
- Fin Walker
- Mark Dendy
- Mikhail Ilyin
- Brian Reeder
- Scott Wells
- Amy Seiwert
- Natalia Magnicaballi
- Kristi Boone
- William Cannon
- Teresa Reichlen
- Nejla Y. Yatkin
- Erik Kaiel
- Domingo Rubio
- Kristen Foote
- Kathi Martuza
- Motaz Kabbani

== 2004 ==
"25 to Watch" for 2004:

- George Piper Dances
- Noémie Lafrance
- Benjamin Levy
- Dominic Walsh Dance Theater
- Stella Abrera
- David Hallberg
- Verb Ballets
- Cathy Marston
- Matjash Mrozewski
- Nicolas Blanc
- Viengsay Valdes
- Revealing the Emotional Body (works by New York choreographers Aviva Geismar, Fiona Marcotty, Mollie O'Brien, and RoseAnne Spradlin)
- Emily Patterson
- Janice Garrett
- Seth Orza
- Peter Boal and Company
- Jason Samuels-Smith
- Margie Gillis
- Erick Montes
- Bradon McDonald
- Paulette Beauchamp
- Train Wreck Dance Company
- Vincent Mantsoe
- Larry Keigwin
- Christopher Stowell

== 2003 ==
"25 to Watch" for 2003:

- Bahiyah Sayyed-Gaines
- Jerry Mitchell
- Tamieca McCloud
- Taryn Kaschock
- Veronika Part
- Christopher Hampson
- Jamie Farquhar
- Johannes Wieland
- The Foundry's
- Sduduzo Ka-Mbili
- Misty Copeland
- Diane Coburn Bruning
- Narrative Ballets (as a rising genre; choreographers Paul Vasterling, Trey McIntyre, Todd Bolender)
- Justin Jones and Chris Yon
- Les Ballets Jazz de Montreal
- Daisuke Takeuchi
- Henri Oguike
- Ruben Martin
- Carrie Imler
- CityDance Ensemble
- Irina Golub
- Jose Mateo
- Alexandra Ansanelli
- Amanda Miller
- Guillaume Cote

== 2002 ==
"25 to Watch" for 2002:

- Akram Khan
- Mariellen Olson
- Andrian Fadeyev
- Genevieve Guerard
- Thaddeus Davis
- Melissa Barak
- Sonya Delwaide
- Maia Wilkins
- David Shimotakahara
- Roxane Butterfly
- Gillian Murphy
- Jorden Morris
- Philadelphia (as an up-and-coming city for dance)
- Wade Robson
- Anita Sun Pacylowski
- Tamar Rogoff
- Sean Steward
- Chica Mori
- Cleo Mack
- Sarah Hughes
- Tony Powell
- Alison Roper
- Ashley Canterna
- Nicholas Leichter
- Williamsburg (as an artistic community)

== 2001 ==
"25 to Watch" for 2001:

- Xiao Nan Yu
- Calvin Kitten
- Shawn Bowen
- Michael Moschen
- 3 point juncture (choreographers Yanira Castro, Tiffany Mills, and Pam Tanowitz)
- Yasuko Yokoshi and Gonnie Heggen
- T.J. Espinoza
- The Young Hoofers (Traci Mann)
- Kaori Nakamura
- Adam Hendrickson
- Daniel Ulbricht
- Marcelo Gomes
- Daniel Marshall
- Richard Move
- Retail Dance (choreographer Kim Shipp)
- Ashley Bouder
- Paule Turner
- Wayne McGregor
- Caroline Rocher
- Li Chiao-Ping
- Bill "Crutchmaster" Shannon
- Kyra Nichols
- Dancewear's Junction: Fashion, Function (towards more stylish dance clothes)
- Paul S. Abrahamson
- Miami City Ballet
