= Natalia Magnicaballi =

- Born: 1976 or 1977 (age 49–50); Buenos Aires, Argentina
- Occupations: Prima Ballerina, Principal Dancer, Artist Coach, Ballet Instructor, Ballet Dancer
- Career
- Former groups: Suzanne Farrell Ballet; Ballet Arizona
- Website: NataliaMagnicaballi.com

Natalia Magnicaballi was a principal ballet dancer with the Suzanne Farrell Ballet and Ballet Arizona.

== Early life and education ==
Magnicaballi was born in Buenos Aires, Argentina where she began her ballet training at the age of seven under the tutelage of Mercedes Serrano and Wasil Tupin. At the age of nine she was accepted to study at the Instituto Superior de Arte of the Teatro Colón, where she later graduated with the best qualifications.

== Career ==
She became a principal dancer at the age of 19 with Julio Bocca's Ballet Argentino under the direction of Lidia Segni. In Europe she joined the Italian company Aterballetto under Mauro Bigonzetti's direction. Magnicaballi is a principal dancer with the Suzanne Farrell Ballet since 1999 and Ballet Arizona since 2002.

Her classical repertoire included Odette/Odile in Swan Lake, Kitri/Mercedes in Don Quixote, Swanilda in Coppélia, The Sugar Plum Fairy in The Nutcracker, Titania in Midsummer Night's Dream, Juliet in Romeo & Juliet and the title roles in Raymonda (Act. III), Paquita, La Sylphide and Giselle.

Magnicaballi's Balanchine repertoire included the lead roles in: Tzigane, Don Quixote, Duo Concertante, La Sonnambula, Divertimento No 15, Apollo, Slaughter on Tenth Avenue, Agon, “Rubies” and “Diamonds” from Jewels, Allegro Brillante, Serenade, Bugaku, Ballade, Meditation, Four Temperaments, Who Cares?, Liebeslieder Walzer, Episodes, La valse, Stravinsky Violin Concerto and Robbins’ Afternoon of a Faun.

Her contemporary repertoire included works by renowned choreographers like: Jiri Kylian, Roland Petit, Mauro Bigonzetti, Dwight Roden, Christopher Wheeldon, Ib Andersen, Oscar Araiz, Alberto Mendez, Mauricio Wainrot, Ana María Stekelman, José Antonio Ruiz, Gustavo Mollajoli, Julio Lopez y Vittorio Biagi.

She toured and performed in the main houses and arena theatres around five continents including the Paris Opera Garnier and the Mariinsky Theatre and danced in outdoor performances in front of more than 100,000 people in Buenos Aires. She was named one of "25 to Watch" by Dance Magazine in 2005 and named the “Best Dancer” of the State of Arizona by The Arizona Republic.

She retired from Ballet Arizona in May 2018. Suzanne Farrell Ballet closed in 2017.
