= List of Oregon Ballet Theatre performers =

This list of Oregon Ballet Theatre performers comprises dancers who have performed as members of the Oregon Ballet Theatre (OBT); the years in parentheses indicate when the dancers joined OBT.

== 2011-2012 season ==
As of February 2012, the dance company includes:

=== Principal dancers ===
- Brett Bauer (2010-)
- Xuan Cheng (2011-)
- Chauncey Parsons (2008-)
- Alison Roper (1996-2014)
- Haiyan Wu (2011-)
- Yang Zou (2011-)

=== Soloists ===
- Candace Bouchard (2003-)
- Ansa Deguchi (2003-)
- Ye Li (2011-)
- Julia Rowe (2011-)
- Brian Simcoe (2005-)
- Lucas Threefoot (2006-)
- Javier Ubell(2007-)

=== Company artists ===
- Eva Burton (2010-)
- Martina Chavez (2007-)
- Ashley Dawn (2010-)
- Adam Hartley (2011-)
- Makino Hayashi (2010-)
- Olga Krochik (2006-)
- Michael Linsmeier (2011-)
- Kate Oderkirk (2011-)
- Olivia Ornelas (2011-)
- Grace Shibley (2006-)

== Former dancers ==
Former dancers with the Oregon Ballet Theatre include:

=== Former principal dancers ===
- Gavin Larsen (2003-2010)
- Yuka Iino (2003-2013)
- Kathi Martuza (2003-2012)
- Anne Mueller (1996-2011),
  [Interim Artistic Director (2013-)]
- Artur Sultanov (2003-2012)
- Ronnie Underwood (2005-2010)

=== Former soloists ===
- Brennan Boyer (2005-2011)
- Adrian Fry (2006-2010)
- Steven Houser (2004-2011)

=== Former company artists ===
- Scott Bebell (2010-2011)
- Leta Biasucci (2008-2011)
- Michael Breeden (2011-2012)
- Andrea Cooper (2006-2011)
- Christopher Costantini (2012-2014)
- Mia Leimkuhler (2003-2011)
- Neil Marshall (2011-2012)
- Matthew Pippin (2007-2010)
- Christian Squires (2008-2011)
- Brent Slack-Wolfe (2010-2012)
- Raychel Weiner (2008-2010)
