= Jewels (ballet) =

1967 three-act ballet by George Balanchine

Jewels is a three-act ballet created for the New York City Ballet by co-founder and founding choreographer George Balanchine. It premièred on Thursday, 13 April 1967 at the New York State Theater, with sets designed by Peter Harvey and lighting by Ronald Bates.

Jewels has been called the first full-length abstract ballet. It has three related movements: Emeralds, Rubies, and Diamonds (usually separated by intermissions). It can also be seen as three separate ballets, linked by their jewel-colored costumes. Balanchine commented: "The ballet had nothing to do with jewels. The dancers are just dressed like jewels." Each of the three acts features the music of a different composer: Emeralds is set to the music of Gabriel Fauré, Rubies to the music of Igor Stravinsky and Diamonds to music by Pyotr Ilyich Tchaikovsky.

In 1976, Balanchine expanded Emeralds by adding a pas de deux and a closing pas de sept.

== Costumes ==
The costumes were created by Balanchine's long-time collaborator Barbara Karinska, who created a distinct look for each different act: romantic, calf-length tulle skirts for Emeralds, fabric that flared at the hips of both men and women in Rubies, and the flat, classical tutu of the Imperial Russian Ballet for Diamonds. The costumes were such finely crafted pieces of art in their own right that some of them have been exhibited in museums and in theatre lobbies. Even Claude Arpels of Van Cleef & Arpels, who suggested the idea of a ballet based on gems to the choreographer, was impressed with her attention to finding the finest trim that would accurately represent the true glitter of genuine gemstones. Additionally, Karinska's painstaking work is credited with making the costumes last despite the sweat and strain of dancing in them. Her designs, needlework and choice in fabrics made them both durable and danceable, illustrating that the bodies inside the costumes were deserving of her utmost respect. When questioned about her attention to her almost extravagant detail she replied, "I sew for girls and boys who make my costumes dance; their bodies deserve my clothes."

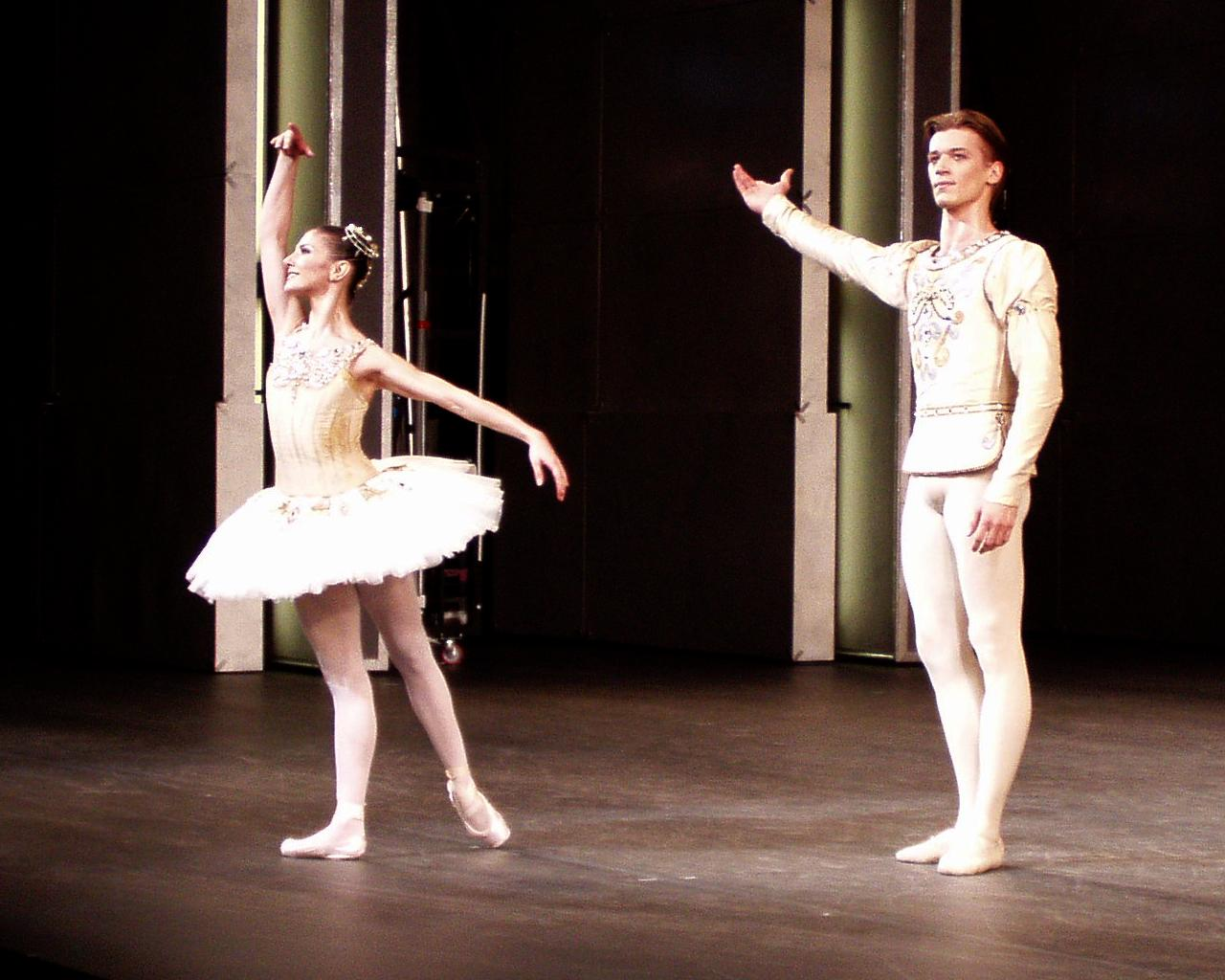
Rupert Pennefather and Alina Cojocaru in the Diamonds suite from the opening night of the revival of George Balanchine's Jewels performed by The Royal Ballet, Friday, November 23, 2007

== Music ==
=== Emeralds ===
- extracts from Gabriel Fauré's Pelléas et Mélisande (1898) and Shylock (1889).
  - average length 31 mins.

=== Rubies ===
- Capriccio for Piano and Orchestra (1929) by Igor Stravinsky.
  - average length 19 mins.

=== Diamonds ===
- Movements 2, 3, 4 and 5 from Symphony No. 3 in D major (1875) by Pyotr Ilyich Tchaikovsky
  - average length 31 mins.

== Casts ==
=== Original ===
At the premiere in Spring 1967, Mimi Paul danced the parts of Sicilienne variation and the Nocturne ("walking") pas de deux in Emeralds. Paul later went on to coach other dancers in the part, including Sara Mearns.

Emeralds

- Violette Verdy
- Mimi Paul
- Sara Leland
- Suki Schorer
- 10 additional women
- Conrad Ludlow
- Francisco Moncion
- John Prinz

Rubies

- Patricia McBride
- Patricia Neary
- Edward Villella

- 8 additional women
- 4 additional men

Diamonds

- Suzanne Farrell
- Jacques d'Amboise

- 4 demi-soloist couples

- 12 additional women
- 12 additional men

== Stagings (other than NYCB) ==
- 1974 Paris Opera Ballet (Note: Garnier)
- 1977 Dutch National Ballet
- 1980 Les Grands Ballets Canadiens
- 1980 Zurich Ballet (Note: Ballett des Opernhauses Zurich)
- 1981 Chicago City Ballet (Note: closed)
- 1982 Ballett der Deutschen Staatsoper (Note: East Berlin)
- 1982 Los Angeles Ballet
- 1985 Ballet de l'Opera du Rhin (Note: Strasbourg, France)
- 1985 Royal Danish Ballet
- 1986 Boston Ballet
- 1986 Pennsylvania Ballet
- 1986 Ballet de l'Opera du Rhin
- 1986 Dutch National Ballet
- 1987 Ballet of Flanders (Note: Koninklijk Ballet Van Vlaanderen/Royal Flemish Ballet)
- 1987 The Chautauqua Institution (Note: New York)
- 1987 San Francisco Ballet
- 1987 Texas Ballet (Note: formerly Fort Worth Dallas Ballet)
- 1988 Ballet du Nord (Note: France)
- 1988 Pacific Northwest Ballet
- 1988 PACT Ballet (Note: Performing Arts Council of the Transvaal—Johannesburg, South Africa)
- 1988 Boston Ballet
- 1988 Royal Danish Ballet
- 1989 Louisville Ballet
- 1989 Royal Ballet, London
- 1990 Ballet de San Juan
- 1990 Les Ballets de Monte-Carlo
- 1990 Ballet du Nord
- 1990 Ballett der Deutschen Staatsoper (Note: Berlin)
- 1990 PACT Ballet
- 1990 Paris Opera Ballet
- 1991 Ballet Chicago
- 1991 Pacific Northwest Ballet
- 1991 San Francisco Ballet
- 1991 Texas Ballet
- 1992 Ballett der Deutschen Oper
- 1992 Miami City Ballet
- 1992 Miami City Ballet
- 1992 Pennsylvania Ballet
- 1993 Finnish National Ballet
- 1993 Sacramento Ballet
- 1993 Ballet du Nord
- 1994 La Scala (Note: Corpo do Ballo del Teatro alla Scala, Milan, Italy)
- 1994 Pittsburgh Ballet Theatre
- 1994 Louisville Ballet
- 1994 Miami City Ballet
- 1994 Miami City Ballet
- 1994 PACT Ballet
- 1994 Texas Ballet
- 1995 American Repertory Ballet
- 1995 Kansas City Ballet
- 1995 Miami City Ballet
- 1995 Pacific Northwest Ballet
- 1996 Asami Maki Ballet (Note: Japan)
- 1996 Cincinnati Ballet
- 1996 Colorado Ballet
- 1996 North Carolina Dance Theatre
- 1996 Miami City Ballet
- 1996 Paris Opera Ballet
- 1996 Pennsylvania Ballet
- 1996 Texas Ballet
- 1997 Ballet Arizona
- 1997 Milwaukee Ballet
- 1997 Dutch National Ballet
- 1997 Miami City Ballet
- 1997 Miami City Ballet
- 1997 Pittsburgh Ballet Theatre
- 1997 Pittsburgh Ballet Theatre
- 1997 Pittsburgh Ballet Theatre
- 1997 San Francisco Ballet
- 1997 Texas Ballet
- 1998 Alberta Ballet
- 1998 Hartford Ballet
- 1998 San Diego Ballet
- 1998 Singapore Dance Theatre
- 1998 PACT Ballet
- 1998 Texas Ballet
- 1999 Ballet Austin
- 1999 Carolina Ballet
- 1999 Mariinsky Ballet
- 1999 Cincinnati Ballet
- 1999 Paris Opera Ballet
- 1999 Pennsylvania Ballet
- 1999 Royal Danish Ballet
- 1999 Sacramento Ballet
- 2000 National Ballet of Canada
- 2000 Royal Winnipeg Ballet
- 2000 Dutch National Ballet
- 2000 Paris Opera Ballet
- 2000 Pittsburgh Ballet Theatre
- 2001 Ballet National de Marseille
- 2001 Ballet NY
- 2002 Ballet du Capitole de Toulouse
- 2002 Kirov Ballet (Note: John F. Kennedy Center for the Performing Arts) (Note: Metropolitan Opera Association)
- 2002 Paris Opera Ballet
- 2002 San Francisco Ballet
- 2002 San Francisco Ballet
- 2002 San Francisco Ballet
- 2002 San Francisco Ballet
- 2002 Texas Ballet
- 2003 BalletMet (Note: Columbus, Ohio)
- 2003 Oregon Ballet Theatre
- 2003 Washington Ballet
- 2003 Cincinnati Ballet
- 2003 Milwaukee Ballet
- 2003 National Ballet of Canada
- 2003 Paris Opera Ballet
- 2003 Zurich Ballet
- 2004 Cape Town City Ballet
- 2004 Boston Ballet
- 2004 Colorado Ballet
- 2004 Finnish National Ballet
- 2004 La Scala
- 2004 Louisville Ballet
- 2004 Paris Opera Ballet
- 2004 Sacramento Ballet
- 2005 Scottish National Ballet
- 2005 Suzanne Farrell Ballet
- 2005 Teatro Colón
- 2005 Pacific Northwest Ballet
- 2006 The National Ballet of Canada
- 2006 Chamberlain Ballet
- 2006 Hamburg Ballet
- 2006 Alberta Ballet
- 2006 City Ballet of San Diego
- 2006 Dutch National Ballet
- 2006 Kirov Ballet
- 2006 Pacific Northwest Ballet
- 2006 San Francisco Ballet
- 2007 Festival Ballet (Note: Rubies)
- 2007 Ballet Arizona
- 2007 Los Angeles Ballet
- 2007 Paris Opera Ballet
- 2007 Royal Ballet, London
- 2008 Charleston Ballet Theatre
- 2008 Hong Kong Ballet
- 2008 Nevada Ballet Theatre
- 2008 Los Angeles Ballet
- 2008 National Ballet of Canada
- 2008 Paris Opera Ballet
- 2008 Royal Ballet, London
- 2008 Suzanne Farrell Ballet (Note: Diamonds)
- 2009 Scottish National Ballet
- 2011 Ballet Dortmund
- 2011 Semperoper Ballett
- 2011 La Scala
- 2011 Royal Ballet, London
- 2012 Ballet West, Utah
- 2012 Bolshoi Ballet, Moscow
- 2012 The University of Arizona
- 2013 Royal Ballet, London
- 2014 Oklahoma City Ballet
- 2014 La Scala
- 2014 Boston Ballet
- 2014 Pacific Northwest Ballet
- 2015 Suzanne Farrell Ballet (Note: Emeralds)
- 2015 Het Nationale Ballet, Amsterdam
- 2016 The Sarasota Ballet
- 2017 Royal Ballet, London
- 2017 Lincoln Center Festival (Paris Opera Ballet, New York City Ballet, and Bolshoi Ballet)
- 2018 Bayerisches Staatsballett (Bavarian State Ballet)
- 2018 Ballet West, Utah
- 2018 Pennsylvania Ballet, Philadelphia
- 2019–2020 Wiener Staatsoper, Vienna
- 2022 Miami City Ballet
- 2022 Royal Danish Ballet
- 2023 Staatsoper, München
- 2023 The Australian Ballet, Sydney & Melbourne
- 2024 Colorado Ballet
- 2024 The National Ballet of Canada
- 2024 The Norwegian National Ballet
- 2025 Het Nationale Ballet, Amsterdam
- 2025 Wiener Staatsoper, Vienna
- 2025 Pacific Northwest Ballet
- 2026 Oregon Ballet Theatre
- 2026 Carolina Ballet

== Quotes ==
"It is open to doubt whether even George Balanchine has ever created a work in which the inspiration was so sustained, the invention so imaginative or the concept so magnificent as in the three-act ballet that had its world première at the New York State Theater last night." Clive Barnes

"In 1967, the three-part ballet called 'Jewels' was made, and it is still unsurpassed as a Balanchine primer, incorporating in a single evening every important article of faith to which this choreographer subscribed and a burst of heresy, too, to remind us that he willingly reversed himself on occasion." Arlene Croce

"An instant masterpiece" Anna Kisselgoff

"Next year, George Balanchine's pure-dance triptych 'Jewels' will have its 50th anniversary. It remains a perfect introduction to ballet: Few full-length story ballets are as satisfying as this storyless one...." Alastair Macaulay

== Awards ==
At the 2008 Laurence Olivier Awards, the Royal Ballet won two Laurence Olivier Awards for their company premiere of Jewels at the Royal Opera House, Covent Garden, featuring new scenic designs by Jean-Marc Puissant, original costume designs by Barbara Karinska, and lighting by Jennifer Tipton. This was the first performance of the full-length ballet by the company, picking up the awards for Best New Dance Production and Outstanding Achievement in Dance. The Olivier Awards are the highest honour in professional British theatre and are equivalent to Broadway's Tony Awards.

== Recordings ==
=== DVD ===
- Balanchine – Jewels by the Paris Opera Ballet (2000). With Aurelie Dupont, Alessio Carbone, Marie-Agnès Gillot, Agnes Letestu, Jean-Guillaume Bart, Clairemarie Osta and Kader Belarbi.
- Choreography by Balanchine by the New York City Ballet (1979). With Suzanne Farrell and Merrill Ashley.
- Jewels by the Mariinsky Ballet (2011). With Irina Golub, Uliana Lopatkina, Igor Zelensky, Andrian Fadeyev, Zhanna Ayupova

=== Other ===
In light of the impact of the COVID-19 pandemic on the performing arts, New York City Ballet released recordings of Rubies and Diamond. Rubies featured Megan Fairchild, Gonzalo Garcia and Mira Nadon, and was the latter's debut. Diamond starred Sara Mearns and Russell Janzen. Both Rubies and Diamond are recorded in 2019. The Royal Danish Ballet released a video of Emerald, featuring Amy Watson, Jonathan Chmelensky, Susanne Grinder and Marcin Kupinski.

== In Other Works ==
The second volume of The Case Files of Jeweler Richard features a case that revolves around a possibly haunted performance of the ballet. The chapter ends with the characters having watched it themselves and discussing reactions to it.

== Bibliography ==
- Playbill, NYCB, Wednesday, January 2, 2008
- Playbill, NYCB, Saturday, May 31, 2008
- Playbill, NYCB, Saturday, June 7, 2008
- Repertory Week, NYCB, Winter season, 2008 repertory, week 1
- Dance: Appraising Balanchine 'Jewels'; New Work Seen Again at State Theater NY Times, Monday, April 17, 1967, by Clive Barnes
- Dance; The Season Grew Rosier Sunday NY Times, April 23, 1967, by Clive Barnes
- Sunday NY Times, April 30, 1967, by Richard F. Shepard
- NY Times, Saturday, July 8, 1967, by Don McDonagh
