= Andrea Miller =

Andrea Miller may refer to:

- Andrea Miller (publisher), founder and CEO of media company Tango
- Andrea Miller (athlete) (born 1982), New Zealand hurdler and weightlifter
- Andrea Miller (dancer), American dancer
- Andrea Lewis Miller, American academic administrator
