= Onzia =

Onzia is a surname. Notable people with the surname include:

- Koen Onzia (born 1961), Belgian ballet dancer and dance teacher
- Lenie Onzia (born 1989), Belgian footballer
