= Alison Roper =

American professional ballet dancer (born 1974)

- Born: 1974 (age 51–52); Portland, Maine
- Occupation: Major Gifts Officer for Oregon Ballet Theatre
- Career
- Current group: Oregon Ballet Theatre

Alison Roper is an American professional ballet dancer who performed as a principal dancer with the Oregon Ballet Theatre.

Born in Portland, Maine, she trained with the Portland School of Ballet, the Boston Ballet School, and the Oregon Ballet Theatre School. She also attended Hampshire College for one year.

Roper joined Oregon Ballet Theatre as an apprentice at the age of 22 in 1996 and was promoted into the corps in 1997. She was ranked principal dancer in 2007, the year when OBT ranked its dancers for the first time. Her repertoire includes ballets by George Balanchine, Christopher Wheeldon, Jerome Robbins, Frederick Ashton, Kent Stowell, Peter Martins, Paul Taylor, and Bebe Miller. She has also originated roles in works by choreographers such as James Kudelka, Trey McIntyre, former OBT artistic director James Canfield, and current artist director Christopher Stowell.

In 2002, Roper was named one of "25 to Watch" by Dance Magazine. She spent the summers of 2005 through 2007 dancing with the Trey McIntyre Project, where she has since served as ballet mistress and repetiteur. She also performed with Morphoses: The Wheeldon Company in 2010.

Roper is married to Michael Mazzola, and they have a son named John Alan. She was a ballet mistress for Oregon Ballet Theatre School until she retired in the summer of 2018
