= Velicu =

Velicu is a surname. Notable people with the surname include:

- Dumitru Velicu (1930–1997), Romanian equestrian
- Francesca Velicu (born 1997 or 1998), Romanian ballet dancer
- Marian Velicu (1977–2024), Romanian boxer
