= Wonderbound =

Contemporary ballet company

General information
- Name: Wonderbound
- Year founded: 1992; 34 years ago (as Ballet Nouveau Colorado); 2012; 14 years ago (as Wonderbound)
- Principal venue: 2535 East 40th Avenue Denver, CO
- Website: wonderbound.com

Artistic staff
- Artistic director: Garrett Ammon

Wonderbound (formerly Ballet Nouveau Colorado) is a contemporary ballet company based in Denver, Colorado. It is the second largest ballet company in the state.

== History ==
=== Ballet Nouveau Colorado ===
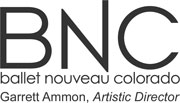
Ballet Nouveau Logo

Ballet Nouveau Colorado was founded in 1992 as a non-profit student performing company and school, providing outreach performances for elementary schools in Adams County and Denver's North Metro area. In 2002 BNC transitioned to maintaining a full-time contemporary ballet company. Later in 2002 BNC was honored by the Colorado State House of Representatives with CO House Resolution #02-1009 "for its commitment to bringing arts to the metropolitan region and for providing a wonderful educational haven to individuals who are interested in dance". By 2005 BNC had grown into the second largest ballet company in the State of Colorado. At the start of their 2007–2008 season BNC hired husband/wife team Garrett Ammon and Dawn Fay to take over the artistic direction of the company, made a significant adjustment to their marketing campaign and established a widespread presence on the internet including profiles on Facebook and MySpace as well as video postings on YouTube. The school and offices were based in Broomfield.

In December 2009 BNC's Board of Directors made the decision to dismiss Lissy Garrison from her position as executive director, the longest holder of this position till that time. In 1995 Garrison joined BNC as a consultant to the Board of Directors, served as president of the board for two years and became Executive Director in 1999. BNC never disclosed the circumstances surrounding the firing of Garrison. However, since her departure "Ballet Nouveau has changed its administrative structure. Instead of the artistic director being subordinate to the executive director as before, both now report directly to the board and are considered peers."

In the summer of 2010, Garrison's position was filled by Shari Ammon Mills, the sister of the Artistic Director, Garrett Ammon. On January 12, 2011, BNC appointed Christin Crampton Day, a former Colorado Ballet board member and public relations professional to replace Ammon Mills.

In 2012 Directors Ammon and Fay made a commitment to all live music collaborations with artists across Denver. This has resulted in unparalleled productions performed at theaters throughout the Denver metro area.

The company is proud of a partnership with the Performing Arts Complex at Pinnacle Charter School in North Denver. This theater became their home theater in 2007. They currently maintain two staff members at this location who work to manage events at the theater along with an internship and theater program for students of the charter school. They also perform regularly at the PACE Center in Parker, the Newman Center in Denver, in Boettcher Auditorium with the Colorado Symphony and on the Elaine Wolf Theater stage in collaboration with the MACC JCC.

=== Wonderbound ===
In 2012, with assistance from a grant from the Bonfils Stanton Foundation, the company rebranded as Wonderbound including a new logo and spinning The School of BNC off into an independent agency known as the Colorado Conservatory of Dance.

Along with the branding change, Wonderbound moved to their new rehearsal studio space in the heart of Denver, Colorado. One full production a year and four smaller events take place in the studio. The ten Wonderbound dance artists work five days a week, eight hours a day and all rehearsals are free and open to the public.

== Funding ==
Nouveau At Night 2007 - Bottles of Beaujolais Nouveau

Wonderbound is a non-profit 501(c)(3) arts organization and as such is supported by donations, grants, and ticket sales. Wonderbound is also supported in part by the Scientific and Cultural Facilities District of Adams, Broomfield, and Jefferson Counties and by the Bonfils Stanton Foundation. Wonderbound earns 30 percent of its revenues from ticket sales. Wonderbound also partners with local communities and businesses to assist in fundraising and applies for and is the recipient of several grants every year.

In 2012, Bonfils Stanton Foundation awarded Wonderbound (then Ballet Nouveau Colorado) with a three-year $75,000 grant to enable them to complete their move to Denver. This was a turning point in the company's lifespan. In 2013, Wonderbound was awarded a $250,000 ArtPlace America award for Creative Placemaking due to their unique space in Denver

== The Company ==
Dancers Strathmeyer, Franklin ('07-'11), Guerra ('05-'10), King, Joyner ('06-'11), Meng, and Watson ('07-'11) at Nouveau at Night 2007

When BNC was founded in 1992 it hired professional dancers only on an "as-needed" basis. In 2002 BNC began to perform professionally maintaining a full-time professional company for the duration of its 25-week session, with only five dancers the first year.

Currently, Wonderbound offers full-time employment to 10 professional dance artists, each with a contemporary ballet background. Employment includes full medical benefits. For most dancers employment at Wonderbound is their only job, however some supplement their income through teaching.

=== Artistic Directors ===
==== Ammon and Fay ====
Dawn Fay

Following Robert Mills' departure BNC recruited Ballet Memphis principal dancers and married couple Garrett Ammon and Dawn Fay. Ammon, winner of the Individual Artist Fellowship for choreography in 2007 from the Tennessee Arts Commission stepped into the role of artistic director and his wife, named one of Dance Magazine's "25 to Watch" for 2007, took on the newly created position of associate artistic director. The new artistic team's first season with BNC took on the theme "Experience the Evolution" and premiered Ammon's "Love of My Life", a ballet choreographed to Queen music, at BNC's annual showcase. The new show was later featured at the fundraiser, Nouveau at Night. Ammon went on to reinvent BNC's Valentine's Day show, "Moulin Rouge", which had originally been presented two years earlier as a one act set in a Toulouse-Lautrec-esque Parisienne cafe choreographed by former artistic director, Robert Mills. Ammon's "Moulin Rouge", a full-length show, was a love story inspired by the 1894 Gothic horror novel Trilby, by George du Maurier and featured the hypnotist character Svengali.

Now in their tenth season of artistic leadership Ammon and Fay have created over 40 ballets together collaborating with artists across Denver.

=== Contemporary Ballet ===
Wonderbound, as a contemporary ballet company presents performances featuring all live music with modern highlights, collaborations with poets, visual artists, chefs and even illusionists.

==== Ballet & Popular Music ====
At the beginning of BNC's 2007–2008 season the then new artistic director, Garrett Ammon premiered his ballet "Love of My Life", a performance choreographed to the music of Queen. Before joining BNC, Ammon had choreographed a work titled, "Mediate" set to INXS music. On October 31, 2008, BNC premiered its second show of the 2008–2009 season, "Garrett Ammon's Rock Ballets". Accompanied by "Mediate" and "Love of My Life" was the world premiere of "An Occasional Dream", a ballet set to the songs of David Bowie. According to Ammon, "Unlike traditional ballets that tell a story, movements in these ballets follow the inspiration of the music".

The 2009–2010 season of BNC featured "POP", a ballet that blends pop music and ballet in the style of Rock Ballets. Ammon was joined by 2008 choreography competition finalist, Alex Ketley and 2009 choreography competition winner, Joshua Blake Carter in creating contemporary works for the season's opener. "POP" consisted of four pieces, three premieres and one revival. Carter's piece, "Nothing is forever, darling" utilized the music of Rufus Wainwright while Ketley's "Kill the Anthem" was a blend of indie rock and electronic featuring music from Clap Your Hands Say Yeah, Test Icicles, The Knife, and MGMT. Ammon's two pieces included the world premiere of "Bang Bang" a piece choreographed entirely to Nancy Sinatra's music and "and tomorrow came" a piece that originally premiered on April 4, 2008, at BNC and features music by the indie folk artist Joanna Newsom.

In 2016, Rock Ballets made a triumphant return to sold-out audiences featuring the music of Queen and David Bowie played live by a supergroup made up of Denver's Chimney Choir and Ian Cooke Band, and included a world premiere ballet "Unbroken Sky" featuring a hybrid mix of music by the two bands and choreographed by Wonderbound artist Sarah Tallman.

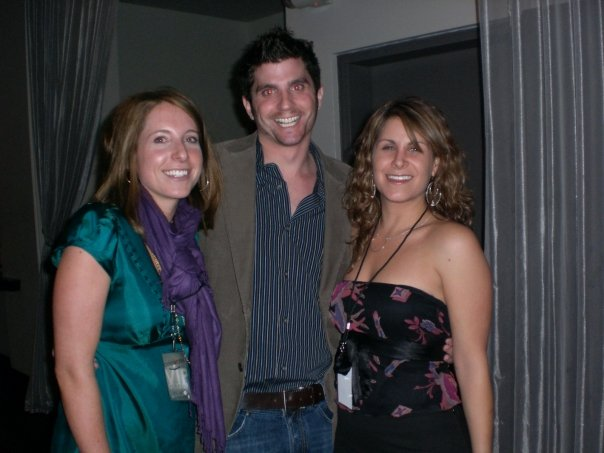
Kairee Sawyer Tormoehlen, Mikey Goldenberg, and Lori Miller of Alice 105.9 at the 25 to Watch party

=== 25 To Watch ===

BNC's professional company was featured at the top of Dance Magazine's "25 TO WATCH: WHO WILL SHINE IN '09" list in the magazine's January 2009 issue. The "25 to Watch" feature opened with a two-page spread listing the 25 companies, dancers, and choreographers to make the list and an article on BNC superimposed over a photo taken by Garret Ammon of BNC dancer, Megan Coatney. One of only two dance companies listed in the 25, the article highlighted the company's 21st Century Choreography Competition, Garret Ammon's Rock Ballets, and BNC's collaboration with Colorado's Lighthouse Writers' Workshop on the February 2009 performance, "Love", featuring new choreography from Ammon, Ma Cong (winner of the 2008 choreography competition), and Canada-based choreographer Mark Godden.

== Outreach ==
Wonderbound offers educational outreach programs providing free arts programming to 20,000 residents each year. They develop a year-long partnership with local elementary schools to provide dance education that supports the schools' curricular goals as well as free performances to students. Wonderbound also provides over 1,000 free tickets each season a diverse group of low-income, senior and at-risk individuals.

=== Year-long Elementary School Partnerships ===
The various elements of the program are designed to give students multiple dance and movement experiences. These include:

- Two interactive lecture/demonstrations in their own facility
- An on-site performance for the entire school that will reinforce concepts from the periods of time discussed in the history presentation
- Two in-depth residencies designed to enhance and support the school's specific curricular priorities
- Two performances where students are bussed to a theatre

Ongoing experiences with Ballet Nouveau Colorado professional artists and teachers encourage students to think more critically about the art they see, be more willing to participate in artistic activities, and learn through non-traditional modalities.
