= Zack Tang =

American professional dancer (born 1988)

Zachary Tang
- Born: Zachary Alexander Tang; June 29, 1988 (age 37); Harris County, Webster, Texas, United States
- Occupation(s): Dancer, Choreographer, Teacher
- Career
- Current group: RUBBERBANDance Group
- Former groups: Alonzo King LINES Ballet

Zachary Alexander Tang is an American professional dancer who performed with RUBBERBAND.

Born in Webster, Texas, Tang is a 2007 graduate of Houston's High School for the Performing and Visual Arts. He then attended the Juilliard School in New York City, where he earned a Bachelor of Fine Arts degree in 2011.

Tang joined the San Francisco based Alonzo King LINES Ballet in 2011. He was named one of "25 to Watch" by Dance Magazine in 2012.
