= Béjart Ballet =

Swiss ballet company

Béjart Ballet Lausanne

General information
- Name: Béjart Ballet Lausanne
- Year founded: 1987
- Founder: Maurice Béjart
- Website: www.bejart.ch/en/

Senior staff
- Executive director: Jean Ellgass

Artistic staff
- Artistic director: Gil Roman 2007–2021
- Ballet master: Julio Arozarena
- Resident choreographers: Maurice Béjart, Gil Roman

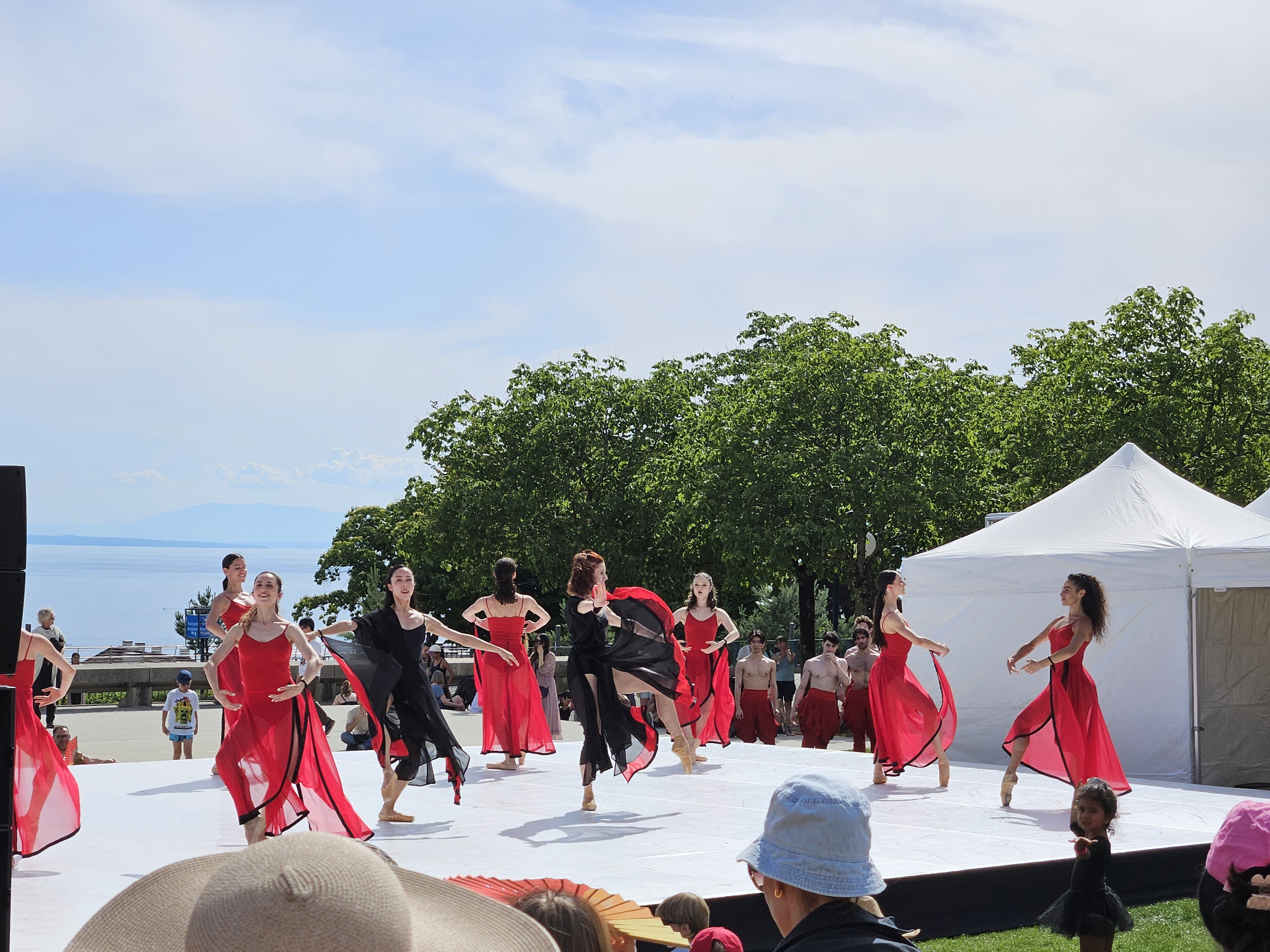
Béjart Ballet Lausanne, outdoor show "Ballet dans la ville" (Lausanne, 2026).

The Béjart Ballet Lausanne is a Swiss ballet company. It is based in the city of Lausanne and performs worldwide.

The Béjart Ballet Lausanne was founded in 1987. It was established by Maurice Béjart, a well-known choreographer who had previously founded and managed the Ballet of the 20th Century in Brussels, Belgium. Since the death of the founder in 2007, Gil Roman, dancer and choreographer was the artistic director till November 2021.

Béjart Ballet Lausanne is one of the very few companies able to fill vast spaces such as the NHK Hall of Tokyo, the Kremlin State Palace of Moscow, Odeon of Herodes Atticus in Athens, the Palais des congrès de Paris, Forest National in Brussels or the Patinoire of Malley-Lausanne.

Since 2007 till 2021, with his search and work for contemporary creation Gil Roman to maintains and develops the repertoire of the Béjart Ballet Lausanne. The work of Maurice Béjart is at the heart of this repertoire, with emblematic choreographies, as The Rite of Spring, Boléro, The Ninth Symphony or Ballet for Life but Gil Roman also wants to present the variety of this repertoire, with Piaf or The Magic Flute for example. Choreographer for 20 years, the artistic director also nourished the repertoire with his own creations. Choreographers like Alonzo King, Tony Fabre, Christophe Garcia, Giorgio Madia, Yuka Oishi or Julio Arozarena also contributed to the creative development of the Béjart Ballet Lausanne.

== Notable dancers ==
Notable past and current dancers at Béjart Ballet include:

- Aesha Ash
- Céline Cassone
- Giorgio Madia
- Leroy Mokgatle
- Koen Onzia
- Anna Plisetskaya
- Daniel Sarabia
- Johannes Wieland

== See also ==
- Prix de Lausanne
