= Kathi Martuza =

American ballet dancer

- Born: Kathleen Martuza; 1979 or 1980 (age 46–47); Boston, Massachusetts
- Occupation: Ballet dancer
- Career
- Current group: Oregon Ballet Theatre

Kathi Martuza is an American former professional ballet dancer who was a principal dancer with the Oregon Ballet Theatre. She previously danced with the San Francisco Ballet for six years and is also known as Kathleen Martuza.

== Early life and education ==
Born in Boston, Martuza started her ballet training at the age of 12 at the Lexington School of Ballet in Massachusetts. After moving to Maryland with her family, she continued with Maryland Youth Ballet in Bethesda. She spent two summers with the Houston Ballet Academy and one summer at the American Ballet Theatre School. While a senior in high school, she took a master class with Betsy Erickson of the San Francisco Ballet and turned down an apprenticeship with the company in order to complete high school in Maryland.

== Career ==
Martuza joined the San Francisco Ballet at the age of 17 in 1997. She was a member of SFB's corps de ballet (as Kathleen Martuza) until 2003.

Martuza joined Oregon Ballet Theatre in 2003 and was ranked principal dancer in 2007, the year when OBT ranked its dancers for the first time. She has had roles created for her by choreographers such as Mark Morris, James Kudelka, Christopher Stowell, Julia Adam, and Yuri Possokhov.

In 2005, Martuza was named one of "25 to Watch" by Dance Magazine. She was also featured on the cover October/November 2007 issue of Pointe magazine. Martuza started teaching ballet at Da Vinci Arts Middle School in Portland, Oregon, in September 2013, and is currently teaching there now.

== Personal life ==
In June 2003, Martuza married Kester Cotton, whom she met while both were dancing with the San Francisco Ballet. Her husband, who also danced with OBT from 2003 through 2006, is now a Doctor of Physical Therapy and a consulting staff member at Oregon Ballet Theatre School. Martuza and Cotton have a son, Roy, born October 2011.
