= Whitney Jensen =

American ballet dancer (born 1992)

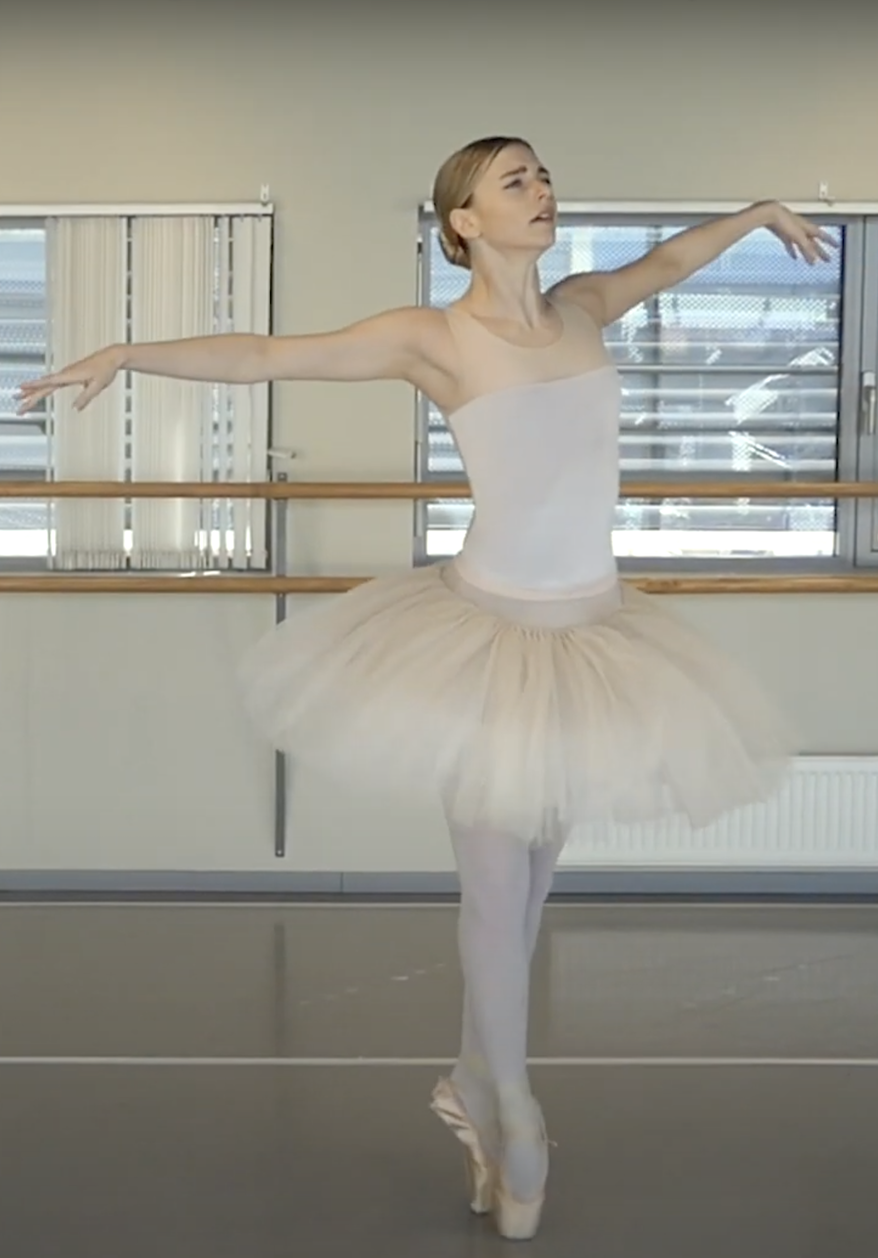
- Whitney Jensen dances for Swans for Relief (2020)
- Born: May 4, 1992 (age 34); Sandy, Utah, U.S.
- Occupation: Ballet dancer
- Years active: 2009-present
- Career
- Current group: Norwegian National Ballet
- Former groups: Boston Ballet

Whitney Jensen (born May 4, 1992) is an American ballet dancer who is currently a principal dancer with the Norwegian National Ballet in Oslo, and was previously a principal with the Boston Ballet.

== Early life and education ==
Jensen was born in Sandy, Utah, and raised in Park City. Her mother was a professional dancer and later a teacher, and her two sisters are Broadway dancers. She started dancing at age 6, in ballet, jazz, tap and hip hop, and focused on ballet two years later. At age 11, when competing at the Youth America Grand Prix, she met Valentina Kozlova, a former Bolshoi Ballet principal, then began travelling between Utah and New York to train with Kozlova. At age 13, Jensen moved to New York, to train with Kozlova privately while completing her school work online.

== Career ==
At ages 11 and 12, she performed in the Radio City Christmas Spectacular as Clara.

In 2008, Jensen won the special distinction prize at the junior division of the Varna International Ballet Competition in Bulgaria. She was the first American to win this award. She then danced with the Hungarian National Ballet as the Sugar Plum Fairy in The Nutcracker. In 2009, she was listed as one of Dance Magazine's "25 to Watch". That year, at age 17, she joined the Boston Ballet. She was promoted to second soloist months later, then to soloist in 2011. In 2014, at age 22, she was promoted to principal dancer, making her one of the youngest principals in the company's history. She was cast in contemporary works more often.

In 2015, Jensen left the Boston Ballet. She later said of her departure, "I loved the company and the people there. I felt it was time for me to take a breather and reflect on what I wanted and how I can progress in my own way—and not measure roles or promotions as success." She said she took a six-month hiatus, but continued to practice during that time. She then contacted Norwegian National Ballet's director Ingrid Lorentzen, who offered her a contract, and relocated to Oslo in February 2016. She is currently a principal at NNB, where her repertoire includes full-length classics and works by George Balanchine, Jerome Robbins, Jiří Kylián, William Forsythe and Alexander Ekman.

In 2020, Jensen danced The Swan in Misty Copeland's fundraiser, Swans for Relief, a response to the impact of the 2019–20 coronavirus pandemic on the dance community, with funds going to participating dancers' companies and other related relief funds.

== Personal life ==
Jensen studied at the Northeastern University through a special program for Boston Ballet dancers.

Her father is attorney Mitch Jensen and her mother, Lausanne, directed Dance Corp Esprit. Her two sisters, Sarah Jayne Jensen and Bryn Dowling, are Broadway veterans. In addition, she also has a brother, Walker.
