= Maia Wilkins =

American ballerina

Maia Wilkins is an American ballerina. She was a principal dancer for the Joffrey Ballet from 1991 until 2008. She was the principal of Sacramento Ballet School and is currently the associate director of Ballet at Northern California Dance Conservatory. She used to teach ballet and re-stages Joffrey and Arpino works for the Arpino Foundation.

== Early life ==
Wilkins was born at home in Truckee, California and had her primary pre-professional training with Maggie Banks (former Principal with American Ballet Theatre) in Reno, Nevada. Wilkins moved to New York when she was 15 to continue her professional training at the Joffrey Ballet School. Wilkins joined the Joffrey Ballet in 1991.

== Career ==
After joining the Joffrey Ballet, Wilkins became a leading dancer (Joffrey is officially an unranked company). She went on to dance the lead in many of Joffrey and Arpino's works. She has appeared in both Save the Last Dance and The Company. The Los Angeles Times praised her dancing in a performance of Kettentanz in 1997. The New York Times called her dancing as Caroline in Jardin aux Lilas in 2002 "a superbly articulated performance." As the Sugar Plum Fairy in a 2006 performance of the Nutcracker, the Washington Post described her as "the requisite Sugar Plum Fairy package and then some -- she was delicate, classically pure and never dropped her smile, even when whipping off an array of turns with gyroscopic certainty."

Wilkins was in many of Arpino's Pas de Duex, including Sea Shadow, Light Rain and Secret Places. Wilkins was awarded two Ruth Page Awards for Artistic Excellence and interpretation. Wilkins was named one of the 25 to watch by Dance Magazine in 2002. She appeared on the cover of Dance Magazine twice, once for the Joffrey Ballet and the second time as an American Ballerina. In 2008, Wilkins retired from the Joffrey Ballet after her contract was not renewed in favor of recruiting younger dancers.
