= Sduduzo Ka-Mbili =

Sduduzo Ka-Mbili aka Nunu - son of a Sangoma (much revered traditional healer amidst Bantu-languaged folks of southern Africa) father and a Christian mother - was born 1975 in Engonyameni, a rural area of Durban, South Africa [S.A.]. In 1989, he first attended a Shell Corporation sponsored Dance and Drama Program at the University of Natal where he first learnt about professional performing. Sduduzo joined Phenduka Dance Theatre where he received contemporary dance training from Cape Town's Alfred Hinkel.

As a performer in S.A., Sduduzo worked in Mbongeni Ngema's film Sarafina! starring Whoopi Goldberg, the musical Poison by David Kramer and Taliep Petersen, Soweto Dance Theatre directed by Jackie Semela, and Free Flight Dance Company under the direction of Adele Blank and Christopher Kindo.

In 1997, Sduduzo was one of three recipients granted full scholarships to train at the Alvin Ailey American Dance Center in New York City [NYC]. During his training in NYC, he was given an opportunity to create for Alvin Ailey Repertory Ensemble a dance - Izinhlungu Zami / Who Knows My Sorrow? - which later was performed by Sduduzo, as well as by Repertory Ensemble dancers.

In 1999, he toured the USA with Donald Byrd's The Harlem Nutcracker before establishing Juxtapower - a song and dance production representative of South African culture - which eventually developed into a touring production that travelled extensively throughout the USA.

In 2003, Dance/Arts critic-and-journalist Chris Dohse nominated Sduduzo to be one of Dance Magazine's 25 to Watch and described him as a one-man celebration of South African dance and music whose performance electrifies with his passion for movement and rhythm; and that the work he makes for his ensemble Juxtapower overflows with fierce dancing, humor and generosity of spirit.

Sduduzo's work as choreographer, teacher and dancer has been reviewed by The New York Times, The Washington Post, The Village Voice and Rolling Stone magazine.

He has also shared the same stage with Alicia Keys, Bono, Gwen Stefani, Sheryl Crow, Jay Z, David Bowie, Talib Kweli and many more. During 2008, he was invited by Russell Simmons' Diamond Empowerment Fund, Hearst Magazines, and A Diamond Is Forever-De Beers Group to be featured at their exclusive December 1 Empowerment For Africa dinner in recognition of World AIDS Day which was attended by the likes of Russell and Run Simmons, and Gayle King of O, The Oprah Magazine.

Sduduzo's production together with The Lion King's cast also paid tribute to the legendary film maker and photographer Gordon Parks just prior to his March 2006 passing.

Sduduzo travelled extensively throughout the European Union regions, performing and teaching about his history and culture. In June 2008, he was invited to headline a United Nations Africa Day event attended by dignitaries from all over the world. Also during 2008, he was featured on the NBC-TV show Superstars of Dance as a representative of South Africa.

Sduduzo has overseen productions in New York and created shows for colleges, schools, and special events across America. While studying in college, he was introduced to Radio Broadcasting which changed his life and which led to him becoming a radio-talk-show host and producer of No Questions Asked / Izigqi Zezizwe on New York's WBAI-FM radio station.

Sduduzo is also a founding member of the ANC-US Interim Branch in New York which is a social movement representing the rights and interests of South Africans residing abroad. He holds a Bachelor of Science degree from Empire State College in NYC and is a Masters Candidate for a Social-Public Policy degree at SUNY.

Sduduzo has written his first novel - ENIGOR and the Crystal Children - that was set for release during July 2012.
