= Tango (American magazine) =

2000s lifestyle magazine

- Categories: Lifestyle
- Frequency: Quarterly
- Circulation: 250,000
- Founder: Andrea Miller
- First issue: February 2005
- Final issue: November 2007
- Company: Tango Media
- Country: US
- Website: yourtango.com

Tango magazine was a national lifestyle magazine for women based in New York City targeting ages 25–44, and focusing on love and relationships. First published in February 2005, the magazine was published by Tango Media, a privately held company owned by Andrea Miller.

Within one year Tango doubled its circulation to 200,000, was honored as “Best New Product of the Year” by the Stevie Awards for Women Entrepreneurs, was selected as one of the top new launches of 2005 by Amazon.com, and signed a deal with Passion Parties, reaching six million women via 10,000 consultants. The 2007 rate base was 250,000, though it is unknown how much of this was paid and how much simply verified (i.e., free). Tango was published on a quarterly basis until the print magazine folded in 2007.

Featured stars from hit shows on the cover included The West Wing's Kristin Chenoweth, Desperate Housewives' James Denton and Doug Savant with former Melrose Place co-star and wife Laura Leighton, Cold Case’s Kathryn Morris, Law & Order’s Angie Harmon, and Law & Order: SVU’s Christopher Meloni. Other celebrities that have appeared on Tango's cover are professional football player Jason Sehorn, musician Harry Connick, Jr. with model wife Jill Goodacre, Jada Pinkett Smith, and Alicia Silverstone on the Summer 2007 issue.

As a result of a partnership with Warner Bros., Tango promoted exclusive features and contests for relationship films such as In the Land of Women and License to Wed.

== YourTango ==
YourTango.com (known as YourTango) is the online version of the magazine launched in February 2009, with editorial staff and contributors.

YourTango is aimed at women who are coming of age romantically, seeking understanding of issues they care about, and striving for a greater sense of belonging. YourTango has provided content for news magazine Time, and lifestyle magazines Glamour and SELF. It is a content-sharing provider for Yahoo!.
