= Irina Golub =

Russian ballet dancer (born 1980)

- Born: 13 November 1980 (age 45); Leningrad, Russian SFSR, Soviet Union
- Occupation: ballet dancer
- Career
- Former groups: Mariinsky Ballet

External images
- Photo 1
- Photo 2

Irina Ivanovna Golub (Russian: Ирина Ивановна Голуб; born 13 November 1980 in Leningrad) is a Russian ballerina, formerly with the Mariinsky Ballet, once known as the Kirov Ballet.

Born in what was then Leningrad, and a graduate of the Vaganova Academy, Ms. Golub joined the Mariinsky in 1998 at the age of eighteen. Known for her great beauty and acclaimed for her dancing by critics, she has been hailed in the Mariinsky production of George Balanchine's Jewels, in which she danced Rubies. She has also appeared in the title role of Prokofiev's Cinderella and as Juliet in the same composer's Romeo and Juliet. In 2001, she first danced the role of Masha (Clara) in Mikhail Chemiakin's controversial production of Tchaikovsky's The Nutcracker. Golub has also danced the role of Masha in a recent revival of the more traditional 1934 Vasili Vainonen version of the ballet.

She was named one of "25 to Watch" in 2003 by Dance Magazine.

in 2007, she danced two small roles in a Mariinsky production of Swan Lake with choreography by Konstantin Sergeyev.

In February 2010, Ms. Golub began appearing as the Ballerina in the Mariinsky Ballet's new revival of Igor Stravinsky's Petrushka.

She has recently been part of a ten-member ensemble cast in choreographer Benjamin Millepied's ballet, Without, which uses the music of Frédéric Chopin.

On July 29, 2011, she made her debut in Herman von Løvenskjold's La Sylphide.

Her noted performance in Balanchine's Jewels can be seen in an October 2011 DVD release of the Mariinsky Ballet's production. On DVD she can also be seen as Masha in the Chemiakin Nutcracker and in her two roles in Swan Lake.

In June 2012, Ms. Golub appeared as Hermia in the premiere of the Mariinsky Ballet production of George Balanchine's A Midsummer Night's Dream, a ballet based on Shakespeare's play with music by Felix Mendelssohn.

She has also starred as Carmen in the Mariinsky's production of the Carmen Suite, featuring the music of Georges Bizet as adapted and re-orchestrated by Rodion Shchedrin.

== Personal life ==
In October 2012, Ms. Golub married actor and performance artist Andrey Kislitsin. He has appeared in two films, Drink Tea Outside, and Yolki (or Six Degrees of Celebration), a smash hit in its native country, Russia, but yet to be shown in the U.S. The couple tour with the Cirque du Soleil, of which Kislitsin is a member.

In August 2013, the couple gave birth to their first child, a son.
