= Giorgio Madia =

Italian choreographer and stage director (born 1965)

Giorgio Madia (born 29 July 1965) is an Italian choreographer and stage director active in the fields of opera, ballet, operetta, musical and event.

== Artistic career ==
=== Stage career ===
Giorgio Madia was born in Milan and trained as a dancer from 1976 to 1984 at the ballet school of Teatro alla Scala in Milan. He passed his diploma in 1984. Subsequently, he got his first engagement at the ballet company of La Scala. A role was created for him in the production Le mariage du ciel et de l'enfer, choreographed by Roland Petit.

From 1985 to 1988, Madia was engaged by Maurice Béjart to join his company Ballet du XXe siècle in Brussels, and since 1987 as soloist also with the Béjart Ballet Lausanne, where the company had moved. In 1988 Madia settled to the United States to follow further engagements as soloist dancer with Pennsylvania Ballet and Milwaukee Ballet (1988–1990), San Francisco Ballet (1990–1992) and again at Pennsylvania Ballet (1992–1993), this time as principal dancer. During these years he danced leading roles of the classical repertoire, as well as many neoclassical and contemporary solo parts in works by George Balanchine, Robert Taylor, William Forsythe, Merce Cunningham, and Richard Tanner among others.

From 1988 to 1991 Giorgio Madia was engaged by Rudolf Nureyev to join him on his world farewell tour Nureyev and Friends. In this gala program Madia performed José Limón's choreography The Moor's Pavane and Béjart's Le Chant du Compagnon Errant with Nureyev himself. In 1993 Giorgio Madia returned to Europe and joined the Italian ballet company Aterballetto as principal dancer, from 1995 to 1997 he was engaged at Zurich Ballet.

=== Teacher and Ballet Director ===
In 1997 Giorgio Madia's finished his career as an active dancer. He took responsibility as ballet master, teacher and ballet director: He worked as teacher and ballet master at Balletto di Toscana in Florence (1997-1999), ballet master and assistant to the choreographer under the direction of Richard Wherlock at the BerlinBallett at the Komische Oper Berlin (2000-2001), first ballet master at Basel Ballett (2001). For one season he took the responsibility as ballet director and chief choreographer at the Grand Theatre in Łódź (2000/2001). From 2003 to 2005, Madia was appointed ballet director of the Wiener Volksoper.

=== Choreography and Stage Direction ===
For the ballet company at the Wiener Volksoper Giorgio Madia created two full-length ballets: Nudo (in March 2004) mainly based on music by Johann Sebastian Bach, and Alice (January 2005) based on motifs by Lewis Carroll with music by Nino Rota. The latter he reworked in 2007 for Staatsballett Berlin under the title Alice's Wonderland He also worked out the choreographies for the operetta productions of the Wiener Volksoper during that time. Over the years he collaborated several times with director Helmuth Lohner. His staging of the operetta The Merry Widow at Zurich Opera 1997, to which Madia had contributed the choreography, was revived in 2004.

In 2002 Madia was appointed chief choreographer of the Open Air Operetta Festival Seefestspiele Mörbisch near Vienna and filled this function until 2012. He also took over the position as stage director for the 2003 season's new production of the operetta Giuditta. Since 2005, Giorgio Madia is working freelance as stage director and choreographer.

Commissions took him several times to Staatsballett Berlin, to the Kammeroper Wien, Bühne Baden, State Theatre Cottbus, Opera Krakowska, Opera Wrocławska, Grand Theatre Łódź, and to Italy, where he did creations for the companies of Balletto di Milano and Balletto di Roma. Furthermore, he was commissioned to do the choreographies for the opening ceremony of the Vienna Opera Ball in 2005, 2008, 2009 and 2010. For the opening ceremony of the charity event Life Ball in front of the City Hall in Vienna he created choreographies in 2006, 2007, 2010 and 2011, in 2006, 2007, 2013 and 2015 he also directed it. In 2015 and 2016 he conceived and directed the Parieté-Gala, an inclusion theatre event in Berlin, uniting handicapped and non-handicapped artists.

Alongside the classics of the ballet repertoire ‒ Sleeping Beauty, The Nutcracker, Swan Lake, Romeo and Juliet and La fille mal gardée ‒ are full-length dance works based on individual concepts: Nudo, Alice's Wonderland, Cinderella, OZ – The Wonderful Wizard Chopin imaginaire, Pinocchio, Don Juan based on Christoph Willibald Gluck's ballet music), Vienna Waltz Night as a tribute to Johann Strauss, or the dance comedy Harlequin, which plays with the tradition of the Italian Commedia dell'arte. His work in the field of musical theatre direction include Jacques Offenbach's comic opera Tales of Hoffmann, the musical Ain’t Misbehavin`, a double bill of two baroque operas La Guirlande | Zéphyre by Jean-Philippe Rameau, the operetta Saison in Salzburg, Giuditta for the Seefestspiele Mörbisch, the two short operas Le pauvre matelot | Venus in Africa, Gluck's Orpheus and Eurydice, Bizet's Carmen or the musicals Fiddler on the Roof, Little Shop Of Horrors and La Cage Aux Folles.

His ballet production of Sleeping Beauty in 2006 for the Grand Theatre in Łódź was awarded the Polish Golden Mask for the best production of the season 2005/2006. The ballet production of Cinderella, also for the Grand Theatre in Łódź was awarded the Golden Mask in the categories of ‘best director’, ‘best set’ and ‘best costumes’ in the season 2006/2007. It was revived for the Opera Krakowska in 2009 and for Balletto di Milano in 2011. His first opera direction, Jacques Offenbach's Tales of Hoffmann in the Grand Theatre in Łódź, in the season 2007/2008 also won the Golden Mask in the category ‘best direction’. As 'choreographer of the year' he was honored with the prize "Italia che danza" in 2011. For the 'best light design' in his Cinderella production he was awarded with the Italian “Premio Anita Bucchi”.

== Works (overview) ==
=== Stage Direction ===
- "Giuditta" (Mörbisch Festival 2003)
- "Ain’t Misbehavin '" (Kammeroper Wien 2006)
- "Les Contes d'Hoffmann" (Grand Theatre Łodz 2007)
- "La Guirlande | Zéphyre" (Kammeroper Wien 2008)
- "Season in Salzburg" (Bühne Baden 2008)
- "New Year's Gala" (Grand Theatre Łodz 2010)
- "Le pauvre matelot | Venus in Africa" (Kammeroper Wien 2011)
- "Fiddler on the Roof" (State Theatre Cottbus 2012)
- „Orphée et Eurydice“ (Opera Krakowska 2013)
- „The Little Shop Of Horrors“ (Staatsoperette Dresden 2014)
- „La Cage Aux Folles“ (Oper Leipzig | Musikalische Komödie 2015)
- „Carmen“ (Theater Vanemuine | Estonia 2015)
- "Faust" (Salzburg Festival 2016, Co-Staging and Choreography, Director: Reinhard von der Thannen)
- „Carmen“ (Kammeroper Schloss Rheinsberg 2017)

=== Choreography and Stage Direction ===
- "Stück" (Zurich Opera House 1995)
- "Bolero" (Grand Theatre Łodz 2000)
- "Gershwin" (Grand Theatre Łodz 2001)
- "Giuseppe!" (Grand Theatre Łodz 2001)
- "Kann denn Liebe Sünde sein?" (Theater Basel 2002)
- "Nudo" (Volksoper Wien 2004)
- "Alice" (Volksoper Wien 2005)
- "Sleeping Beauty" (Grand Theatre Łodz 2006)
- "Alice's Wonderland" (Staatsballett Berlin 2007)
- "Cinderella" | Music: Rossini (Grand Theatre Łodz 2007)
- "Les Demoiselles" (Theater Akzent Wien 2007)
- "The Nutcracker" (Grand Theatre Łodz 2008)
- "Romeo e Giulietta" | Music: Tchaikovsky (Balletto di Milano 2009)
- "Swan Lake" (Grand Theatre Łodz 2009)
- "Chopin Imaginaire" (State Theatre Cottbus 2009)
- "Cinderella" | Music: Rossini (Opera Krakowska 2010)
- "OZ - The Wonderful Wizard" | Music: Dmitry Shostakovich (Staatsballett Berlin 2011)
- "Vienna Waltz Night" (Festival of Wiltz, Luxembourg 2011)
- "Cinderella" | Music: Rossini (Balletto di Milano 2011)
- "Harlequin" Dance Comedy (State Theatre Cottbus 2011)
- "La Fille Mal Gardée" (Opera Wroclawska 2012)
- "Il gatto del rabbino" (Balletto di Roma 2012)
- "Coppélia" (Opera Wroclawska 2013)
- "La dolce vita" (Theater Vanemuine | Estonia 2014)
- "Carnival of the Animals" (Staatsballett Berlin 2014)
- "Don Juan" (Staatsballett Berlin 2014)
- "Hänsel & Gretel" (Staatsballett Berlin 2014)
- "Swan Song" (Béjart Ballet Lausanne 2016)
- "Peter Pan" (Croatian National Theatre Zagreb 2016)
- "Don Juan" (Theater Vanemuine | Estonia 2016)
- "Pinocchio" (Baltic Opera Ballet Gdansk 2017)
- "Dangerous Liaisons" (Croatian National Theatre Zagreb 2019)
- "Sen nocy letniej" (Opera Krakowska 2019)
- "Aida" (Opera Krakowska 2025)
- "Tosca" (Teatr Wielki Łódź 2025)
- "Wiedeńska krew" (Opera Krakowska 2026)

=== Choreography ===
- "The Merry Widow" (Zurich Opera House 1997, Director: Helmuth Lohner)
- "The Gypsy Princess" (Seefestspiele Mörbisch 2002, Director: Helmuth Lohner)
- "Boccaccio" (Volksoper Wien 2003, Director: Helmuth Lohner)
- "Wiener Blut" (Volksoper Wien 2004, Director: Robert Herzl)
- "Countess Mariza" (Seefestspiele Mörbisch 2004, Director: Winfried Bauernfeind)
- "A Night in Venice" (Volksoper Wien 2004, Director: Michael Sturminger)
- "The Merry Widow" (Seefestspiele Mörbisch 2005, Director: Helmuth Lohner)
- "The Count of Luxemburg" (Seefestspiele Mörbisch 2006, Director: Dietmar Pflegerl)
- "Wiener Blut" (Seefestspiele Mörbisch 2007, Director: Maximilian Schell)
- "White Horse Inn" (Seefestspiele Mörbisch 2008, Director: Helmuth Lohner)
- "My Fair Lady" (Seefestspiele Mörbisch 2009, Director: Helmuth Lohner)
- "The Tsarevich" (Seefestspiele Mörbisch 2010, Director: Peter Lund)
- "The Gypsy Baron" (Seefestspiele Mörbisch 2011, Director: Brigitte Fassbaender)
- "Die Fledermaus" (Seefestspiele Mörbisch 2012, Director: Helmuth Lohner)
- "My Fair Lady" (Opera Cologne 2012, Director: Dietrich Hilsdorf)
- „Lend me a tenor - Otello darf nicht platzen“ (Oper Leipzig | Musikalische Komödie 2013, Director: Volker Vogel)

== Awards ==
- 2006: "Golden Mask" (Poland) for the Best production, Sleeping Beauty
- 2007: "Golden Mask" (Poland) for Best Director, Cinderella
- 2008: "Golden Mask" (Poland) for Best Director Les Contes d'Hoffmann
- 2011: "Premio Anita Bucchi" for Cinderella, Best Lighting
- 2011: "Italia che danza", Choreographer of the Year
