= Johannes Wieland =

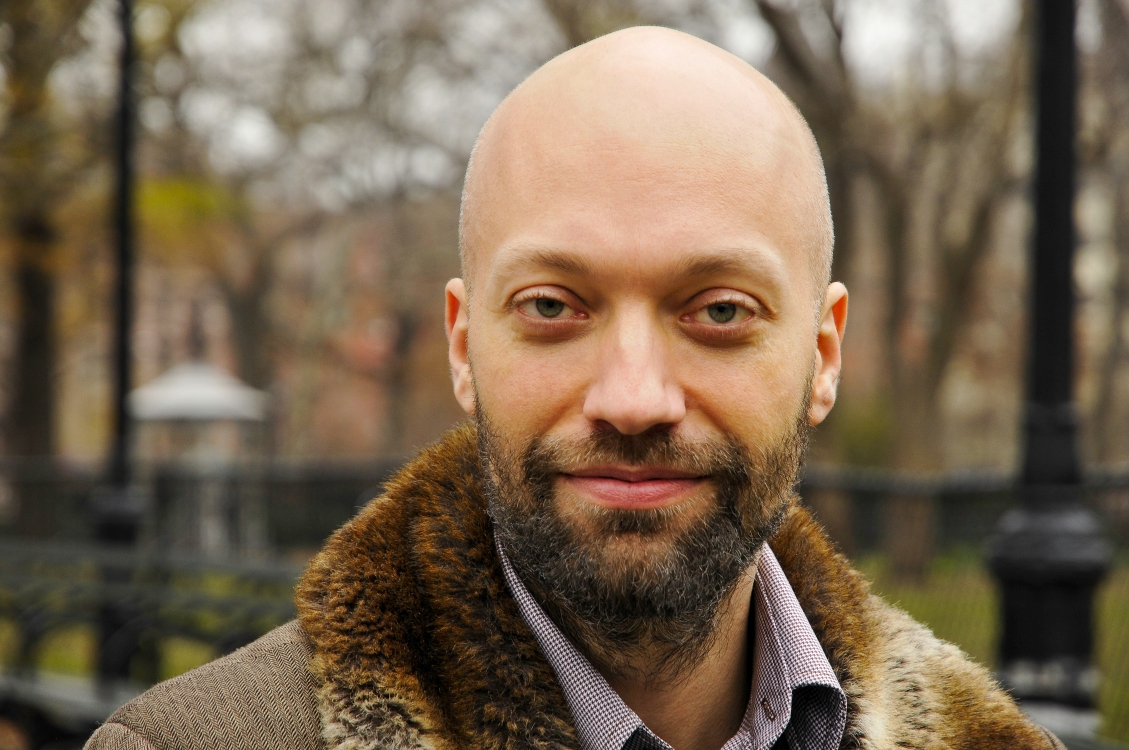
- Wieland in 2008
- Born: November 20, 1967 (age 58); Berlin, Germany
- Occupations: choreographer, teacher, dancer

Johannes Wieland (born 20 November 1967 in Berlin, Germany) is a choreographer, teacher and dancer.

== Biography ==
Johannes Wieland received his early dance training under Ellys Gregor in Berlin, the ballet academy of the Deutsche Oper Berlin, with John Neumeier at the Hamburg State Opera and the Amsterdam School of the Arts where he earned his BFA. His dance career took him back to Germany, the State Theatre of Brunswick, Germany, followed by the Berlin State Opera. Here he worked with numerous guest choreographers, among them Roland Petit and Maurice Béjart. He then joined the Béjart Ballet Lausanne as a principal dancer and also toured extensively with the company. Ready for a radical change, Wieland next moved to New York City, where he was awarded a scholarship to the NYU Tisch School of the Arts, earning his MFA in Contemporary Dance and Choreography in 2002. His company, johannes wieland, was founded that same year and debuted with his original work tomorrow at the Joyce SoHo theater. Praised as 'a spectacular exploration of relationships', by Anna Kisselgoff of The New York Times, this was one in the body of the startlingly powerful, terse strange pieces Wieland began creating for his company, prompting Dance Magazine to cite him as one of "25 to Watch" in 2003. From 2006 until 2021, Wieland was artistic director and choreographer of the resident dance company of the State Theater of Kassel in Germany. He was also associate artistic director of Paradigm in New York and is a guest choreographer and teacher in schools and companies in Europe and North America. He is a permanent resident of the United States and divides his time between New York and Germany.

== Work ==
Wieland guides his dancers to achieve 'unpredictable, improbable feats and configurations' employing his riveting movement vocabulary which exhibits his architecturally driven understanding of bodies and space.

As part of his integrated approach to performance art, Wieland has evolved a rigorous developmental process to explore various situations of causality. This intense process fosters a relationship between the performers, composers, designers and other collaborating artists and institutions involved in Wieland's works. Wieland's work also often incorporates video, text, photography, original sound scoring, set designs of an installation character. As part of his outreach initiative in Kassel, Wieland regularly holds open rehearsals and classes, pre- and post- performance talk-backs with the audience as well as inviting a roster of innovative choreographers to create pieces on his company.

== Awards, honors and grants ==
- 16th International Choreographic Competition in Hanover, Germany, semi-finalist, 2002
- 25 to Watch; Dance Magazine, 2003
- Hubbard Street Choreographic Competition Winner, Chicago, 2004
- Kurt Jooss Award, Germany, 2004
- Goethe Institut, 2004, 2005, 2006, 2018
- Harkness Foundation for Dance, 2004
- Choo-San Goh & H. Robert Magee Foundation, 2004
- Greenwall Foundation, 2004, 2005, 2006
- The Guglielmo Ebreo Competition semi-finalist, Italy, 2006
- Poseidon Services, 2006
- Trust for Mutual Understanding, 2007
- Mid Atlantic Arts Foundation, 2007, 2009
- The William J. Cooper Grant, 2009
- NYSCA, 2005, 2008, 2010, 2011
- Der Faust, German theatre prize (nomination), 2016
- Grant from the city of Kassel, Germany, 2021
- Grant from the state of Hesse, Germany, 2021

== Collaborations ==
- Staatstheater Kassel (State Theater of Kassel)
- Folkwang University of the Arts
- Berkshire Theatre Festival
- The Juilliard School
- Jacob's Pillow Dance
- Bard College
- New York University
- Ben Frost, composer
- Diane von Furstenberg, fashion designer
- Carmen de Lavallade, performer
- Espen Sommer Eide, composer
- Gus Solomons Jr., performer
- Nicole Chevalier, soprano
- Hans-Werner Henze, composer
- Os Gêmeos, graffiti artists
