= Nelida Tirado =

American flamenco dancer

- Born: 1971 (age 53–54); Bronx, New York
- Occupation: dancer
- Website: www.NelidaTirado.com

Nelida Tirado is an American flamenco dancer based in New York City.

Born in the Bronx, Tirado began her training with Ballet Hispanico of New York when she was six years old. She later joined Jose Molina Bailes Espanoles with which she toured the United States. She then joined Carlota Santana's Flamenco Vivo where she was a soloist and dance captain. Tirado was a member of the Spanish Ballet at the New York Metropolitan Opera. She received a grant from the New York Foundation for the Arts as Artist in Residence in 1997.

She has danced in Carmen at the New York Metropolitan Opera, been a featured performer in Riverdance on Broadway, and danced with the flamenco group Noche Flamenca. The "small but potent" dancer was described by a reviewer in the New York Times as dancing "as if her body were a medium for some unearthly force".

== Awards and commendations ==
Tirado was named one of "25 to Watch" by Dance Magazine in 2007. She also won a 2007 BRIO award for dance.
