= Edwin Aparicio =

Edwin Aparicio is a Salvadoran-American dancer. He is the head of the Flamenco Aparicio Dance Company, along with his husband Aleksey Kulikov. He received a cross of the Order of Civil Merit from King Felipe VI in 2016.
