= Mira Nadon =

American ballet dancer

- Born: 2001 or 2002 (age 24–25); Boston, Massachusetts, U.S.
- Education: School of American Ballet
- Occupation: ballet dancer
- Years active: 2017–present
- Dancing career
- Current group: New York City Ballet

Mira Nadon (born 2001 or 2002) is an American ballet dancer. She joined the New York City Ballet in 2018, and in 2023, she was promoted to principal dancer, as the first Asian American woman to hold this position.

== Early life and education ==
Nadon was born in Boston. Her mother, originally from India, was a lawyer, and her father is a professor of government. She has a twin brother. When she was five, her father took a position at Claremont McKenna College, and her family moved to California.

Nadon began her training at Inland Pacific Ballet Academy in Montclair. At age 12, while participating in the academy's summer intensive, she learned excerpts of several works by George Balanchine, which led to her fascination with him and the New York City Ballet (NYCB). The next two years, she attended the summer program at the School of American Ballet (SAB), NYCB's school. Then, the 14-year-old Nadon began attending the school full-time. At the end of her second year, she danced a lead role in Balanchine's Scotch Symphony at SAB's annual workshop performance.

Nadon completed high school through Professional Children's School, concurrently with her time at SAB and NYCB. After she graduated, she began studying at Fordham University.

== Career ==
Nadon became an apprentice with NYCB in November 2017, at just 16, and joined the company as a member of the corps de ballet in 2018. In 2019, at 18, she danced her first major role, as the tall girl in Balanchine's "Rubies" from Jewels. Her performance was singled out by New York Times critic Gia Kourlas, who called it the "crowning jewel" of the season and "a promise to the future." The newspaper listed her performance among "Best Dance of 2019", and named her one of "The Biggest Breakout Stars of 2019".

As a corps dancer, Nadon also danced featured roles in Balanchine's Raymonda Variations, The Nutcracker (as Dewdrop), Monumentum pro Gesualdo and Movements for Piano and Orchestra, Robbins' Glass Pieces, in Martins' The Sleeping Beauty (as Fairy of Courage), Peck's Bright and Tanowitz's Bartók Ballet. During the COVID-19 pandemic, she appeared in pixilation in a wave (Within Wires), a film made for NYCB's digital season, with choreography by Sidra Bell. She also originated a role in Bell's Suspended Animation (2021).

In January 2022, Nadon was promoted to soloist. She originated roles in Justin Peck's Partita (2022) and Copland Dance Episodes (2023), and in Keerati Jinakunwiphat's Fortuitous Ash (2023). She also danced in NYCB's first performance of Robbins' Rondo since 1980. As a soloist, she also danced featured roles in ballets such as Balanchine's The Four Temperaments, Vienna Waltzes, The Nutcracker (as Sugar Plum Fairy), Stravinsky Violin Concerto and Episodes, as well as in Martins' The Sleeping Beauty (as Lilac Fairy and Diamond), and Wheeldon's DGV: Danse à Grande Vitesse.

In February 2023, the 21-year-old Nadon was named principal dancer, becoming the first Asian American woman to hold this position at NYCB.

Nadon also performed with Preston Chamblee in vildwerk.’s 2025 program, Dancing for Our Wonderful World in Christopher Wheeldon's After the Rain. vildwerk. is a nonprofit organization that aims to increase environmental conservation awareness through dance.

In a feature article in the Times, Kourlas called Nadon "a special, once-in-a-generation kind of dancer." Marina Harss in The Hudson Review stated that Nadon is a "dancer one wants to watch in every role." Joanna Biggs in The Yale Review wrote, "Today, the body you can't miss is Mira Nadon: part of what keeps me coming back is her strange aliveness, as well as her growth as an artist.... I also notice how she's forced me to think about ballet as an art form again." About Nadon's Lincoln Center debut in Balanchine's Diamonds, Jerry Hochman wrote in CriticalDance,

Nadon was “on” from the first moments (as she usually is), and she was immediately radiant – a sense that only grew as the dance progressed. She was the embodiment of both Russian ballet and the Russian royal presence prior to the Revolution that at least part of the piece is intended to reflect, but also of NYCB royalty: of Balanchine, and of the ballerinas who danced this role with singular spiritual power, purity of technique, and nobility. Of those I’ve seen dance this role, Suzanne Farrell comes immediately to mind as one of them. Nadon made no mistakes (which is almost a given). And it wasn’t just about technique; it was the ambiance she created. Her performance was as otherworldly as one gets at NYCB, with an added sense of spirituality that made the experience almost mystical. She not only epitomized ballerina royalty; she was what she was supposed to be: a flawless gem that radiates light and promises dreams fulfilled.

== Awards and honors ==
In 2022, Nadon received the Princess Grace Award and the Clive Barnes Award for excellence in dance.
