= Francesca Velicu =

Romanian ballet dancer

- Born: May 22, 1998 (age 28); Bucharest, Romania
- Education: Choreography High School Floria Capsali; The Bolshoi Ballet Academy
- Occupation: ballet dancer
- Years active: 2015-present
- Career
- Current group: English National Ballet
- Former groups: Romanian National Ballet

Francesca Velicu is a Romanian ballet dancer. She is a Soloist at the English National Ballet. In 2018, she won the Laurence Olivier Award for Outstanding Achievement in Dance.

== Early life ==
Velicu was born in Bucharest, Romania. She trained at Choreography High School Floria Capsali in Bucharest and The Bolshoi Ballet Academy in Moscow.

== Career ==
In 2015, at age 17, Velicu joined the Romanian National Ballet, which was directed by Johan Kobborg. Kobborg cast her in soloist roles immediately. She also met Alina Cojocaru, Kobborg's partner and Velicu's idol. However, in 2016, Kobbarg and Cojocaru resigned from the company after the new leadership's actions. After that, Cojocaru suggested Velicu to audition for the English National Ballet, where Cojocaru is a lead principal dancer. After Velicu auditioned in Paris, Tamara Rojo, the company's artistic director, offered Velicu a contract to join the company as an Artist. She moved to London within a week.

In 2017, she danced The Chosen One in Pina Bausch's Le Sacre du printemps, and was praised by critics. The Guardian noted, "her performance has the power and stagecraft of an adult but the sobbing terror of a child." Later that year, she was promoted to First Artist. In 2018, at age 19, she won the Laurence Olivier Award for Outstanding Achievement in Dance for Le Sacre du printemps. She reprised the role in 2019. She had also danced Clara/Sugar Plum Fairy in The Nutcracker.

== Selected repertoire ==
- Clara/Sugar Plum Fairy, Chinese and Spanish in The Nutcracker
- Odalisque in Le Corsaire
- Pas de Trois in Swan Lake
- Princess Florine in Sleeping Beauty
- Third principal couple in No Man's Land
- The Chosen One in Le Sacre du printemps
- Kitri in Don Quixote
- The first couple in Theme and Variations
