= Lisa Benson =

New Zealand artist

Lisa Benson (born 1966) is a New Zealand artist. Her work is held in the collection of Auckland Art Gallery Toi o Tāmaki.

== Career ==
Benson studied painting and photography at the Waikato Institute of Technology, in the Media Arts centre in Hamilton, New Zealand, where she has tutored since 1999. She traveled to Melbourne Institute of Technology to complete a master's degree in 2000, under the guidance of David Thomas.

Benson works mainly with photographic processes and equipment, interested in how time and light create images.

== Notable exhibitions ==
- Drift, Vavasour Godkin gallery, Auckland, 2006. This show was the result of a trip to the South Island to create "disappearing drawings" using light-sensitive photographic paper. She captured images at Lake Grassmere, Mt John Observatory near Lake Tekapo, and Chancellor Dome on Fox Glacier.
- Composite Realities Amid Time and Space: Recent Art and Photography, Centre for Contemporary Photography, Melbourne, 2007. This group exhibition was curated by David Thomas and featured works by artists from Australia, France, Germany, New Zealand and South Korea.
- Exhibited with Nine Dragon Heads at the Sarajevo Winter Festival in 2009.
- Still, RAMP, Hamilton, 2009.
- Blinky, RAMP, Hamilton, 2012. This show presented photographic images, including a series of various neon signs that spell words capturing certain philosophical ideas. Many of the works in this show were inspired by her time in Beijing.

== Awards and residencies ==
- 2007 New Zealand Painting and Printmaking Merit Award for her work Mountain Landscape, Chancellor Dome, Fox Glacier June 2006. This award is organised by the Waikato Society of Arts Inc.
- Finalist in the Trust Waikato National Contemporary Art Award, 2008.
- Recipient of Red Gate Gallery residency in Beijing, 2009.
