= Melanie Greene =

American dancer and choreographer

Melanie Greene is an American writer, dancer, and choreographer. She is best known for being part of a dance ensemble, the skeleton architecture, which won a Bessies Award in 2017.

== Biography ==
Greene is a graduate of the University of North Carolina at Chapel Hill with a bachelor's degree in journalism and mass communication. She went on to receive her Master of Fine arts in dance and choreography at the University of North Carolina at Greensboro. Greene began writing in high school and continues to write performance reviews for The Dance Enthusiast, articles for Dance Magazine, long-form artist profiles of dancers and choreographers for Dancer's Turn, and her personal blog On the Scene with Lanie Reene.

== Dance ==
Greene has been described as a "movement-based artist."

=== Methods of Perception ===
Greene created a collection of dance works called Methods of Perception: Dance to Engage the Senses which seeks to heighten the dance performance experience by engaging all of the senses. Greene states that her work "smells like delicious pomegranates and body sweat wrapped in fuzzy naked flesh and lacy garter belts". Her work has been presented at New York Live Arts, Dixon Place, Movement Research at Judson Church, Brooklyn Arts Exchange Upstart Festival, and the Bronx Academy of Arts and Dance.

== List of Works ==
- Raw Hunny Emerge NYC 2014 Performance, June 2, 2014, LaMama Club
- Under Exposed (curated by Doug Post), November 4, 2014, Dixon Place
- Subject To Change, March 20–21, 2015, Actors Fund Arts Center
- Platform 2016: the skeleton architecture, or the future of our worlds (curated by Eva Yaa Asantewaa), October 22, 2016, Danspace
- with fists, with hands, March 31, 2017, April 1, 2017, Park Slope
- Performing Okay, February 5, 2016, New York Live Arts 2015-2016 Fresh tracks Performance
- Work Up 4.0, March 9–17, 2018, Gibney Dance: Agnes Varis Performing Arts Center
- Prepare to Consume, Compilation Dance Concert, May 6, 2016, The Bronx Academy of Arts & Dance

== Awards and Grants ==
Greene was a 2016 New York Live Arts Fresh Tracks artist, a 2015 Gibney boo-koo Space Grant recipient, and a 2016 Actors Fund Summer Push Grant artist.

As part of the ensemble of the skeleton architecture, Greene won the Outstanding Performer award at the Bessies 2017 alongside Nia Love, Maria Bauman, Paloma McGregor, and others.
