= Andrea Miller (publisher) =

American magazine publisher

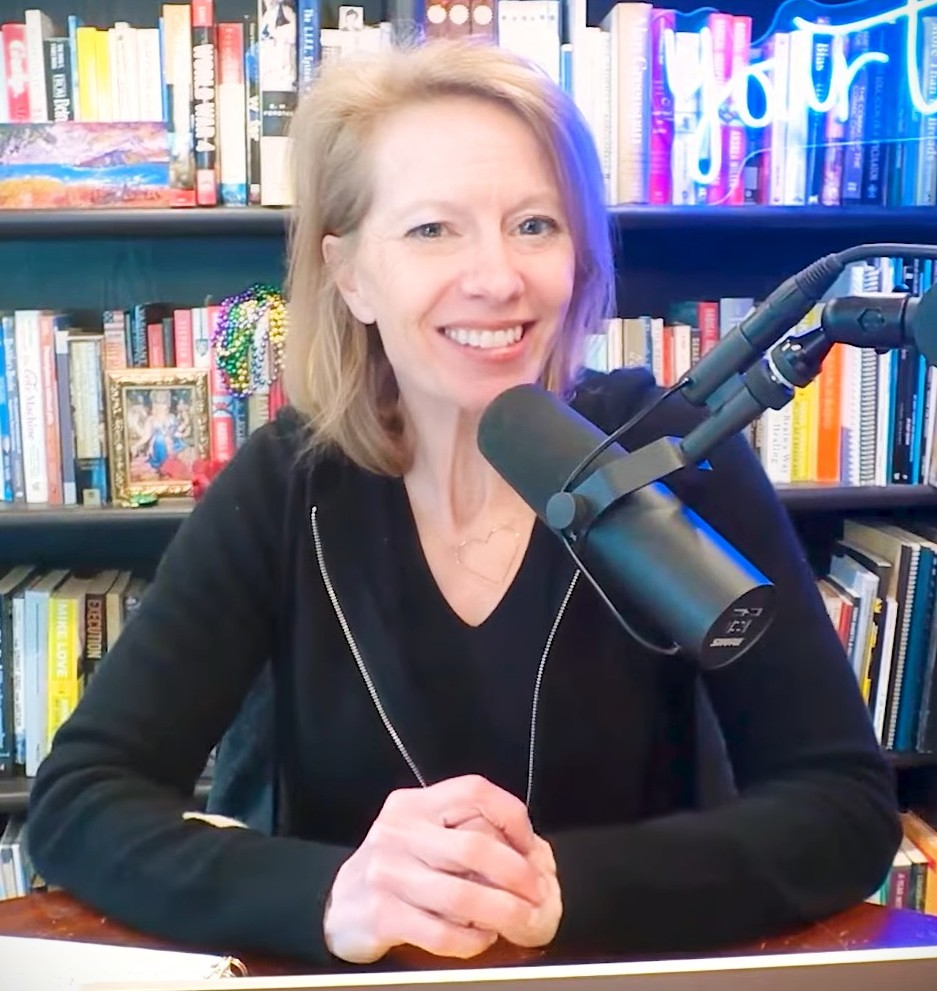
Miller in 2024

Andrea Miller was the founder and CEO of Tango, a media company focused on romantic love.

Miller is a licensed private pilot and a co-head of the New York Chapter of 85 Broads.

Miller has appeared on The Today Show, CNN, Fox News, ABC, and radio stations across the U.S., as well as in numerous national publications such as USA Today, the Los Angeles Times, and Business Week. She is a frequent panelist and guest speaker in university classes at Harvard University, Columbia University, Fordham University, The Wharton School and New York University.

Miller wrote the self-help book Radical Acceptance: The Secret to Happy, Lasting Love, published in 2017. She is the host of the podcast Open Relationships: Transforming Together.
