= Chris Elam =

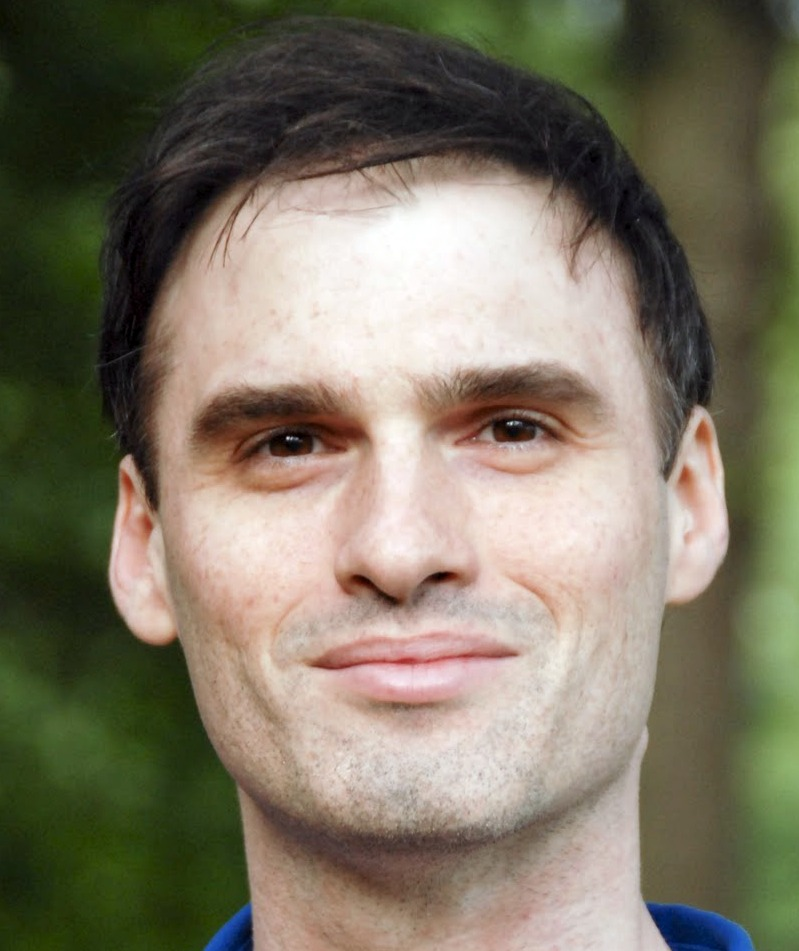
Chris Elam

Chris Elam is the founding artistic director and choreographer of Misnomer Dance Theater, a dance and innovative arts company. Through Misnomer, Elam has also founded BookAFlashMob.com; SwiftFootProductions.com, BookADanceCrew.com; LocalDJforHire.com; and GoSeeDo.org, an engagement platform for booking creative experiences.

Elam has received accolades for the originality of his choreographies - cited as "a true original" and named in the "top ten" dances of the year by The New York Times - and for his leadership in audience engagement. His artistic collaborations include pioneering projects with numerous companies and artists, including Bjork, Apple, and Sundance.

Elam founded BookAFlashMob.com, a worldwide provider of flash mobs tailored for companies, governments, agencies and individuals. BookAFlashMob.com produces over 350 flash mobs annually and has been featured widely, including on Good Morning America, ABC Nightline and CBS News.

Elam has been an invited speaker at leading conferences ranging from TEDx to FORTUNE Brainstorm: Tech, and is a guest choreographer at numerous schools and universities worldwide.

Elam graduated from Brown University and received his MFA in dance from NYU Tisch. He has been on faculty at Brown University and The State Conservatory for the Arts in Turkey, and has served as guest choreographer at eight universities. Chris Elam’s study of traditional dances informs the technical and conceptual complexity of his contemporary choreography.

In 1999 Elam spent seven months with a Topeng dance master in Indonesia, training and performing in temple ceremonies. Misnomer accompanied him to Brazil in 2001 to perform and teach. The following year, Elam taught for six months at the Conservatory in Turkey, and in 2004 he spent three months in Havana choreographing on DanzAbierta, a national dance company of Cuba. In 2005 he performed in Ireland on a European Cultural City Commission, which led to a commission in the Netherlands in 2006 with the interactive technology group Blue Noise Dept.

He creates work about human relationships from a cross-cultural and international perspective. His production "Throw People / Land Flat" was well reviewed by The New York Times; and both earned Misnomer a position as one of "25 to Watch" for 2007 in Dance Magazine and a fellowship from the Baryshnikov Dance Foundation. Elam's choreography has been performed in over 120 theatres in the US, Indonesia, Turkey, Cuba, Ireland, Brazil, France, and Ukraine.

In addition to stage choreography, Elam has conducted numerous interdisciplinary projects and collaborations. In 2005, Elam was featured by an Apple Computers "Pro" documentary with Tronic Studios detailing their collaboration using motion-capture technology to digitize human motion. In August 2007, Elam and his dancers worked closely with Björk to choreograph her newest music video, "Wanderlust". In 2008, Elam will choreograph a dance film directed by Joss Whedon (creator of Buffy the Vampire Slayer, FireFly and Serenity), in which he will also performed as the male lead. He also is currently created a new dance for the Danish Dance Theatre’s 10-dancer company for a four-week première in Copenhagen in May 2008; the piece, which will take place simultaneously on four stages and will be housed in a giant labyrinth, through which the audience had the possibility to walks.

Chris Elam is an advocate of dance and theater companies in general and has spent considerable time developing digital tools that arts groups can use to expand their on-line presence and audience outreach. As part of this initiative, Misnomer is collaborating with film directors to create online videos that transcend the fields of film and dance. Misnomer’s on-line activities were featured in an interview by Business Week Magazine and in an article in the Business Section of the New York Times. Chris Elam is often asked to speak or give workshops about the Misnomer’s choreography, film collaborations, inter-cultural collaborations, and on-line web development and to lecture, most recently at Brown University's speaker series, as a social entrepreneur in the arts.

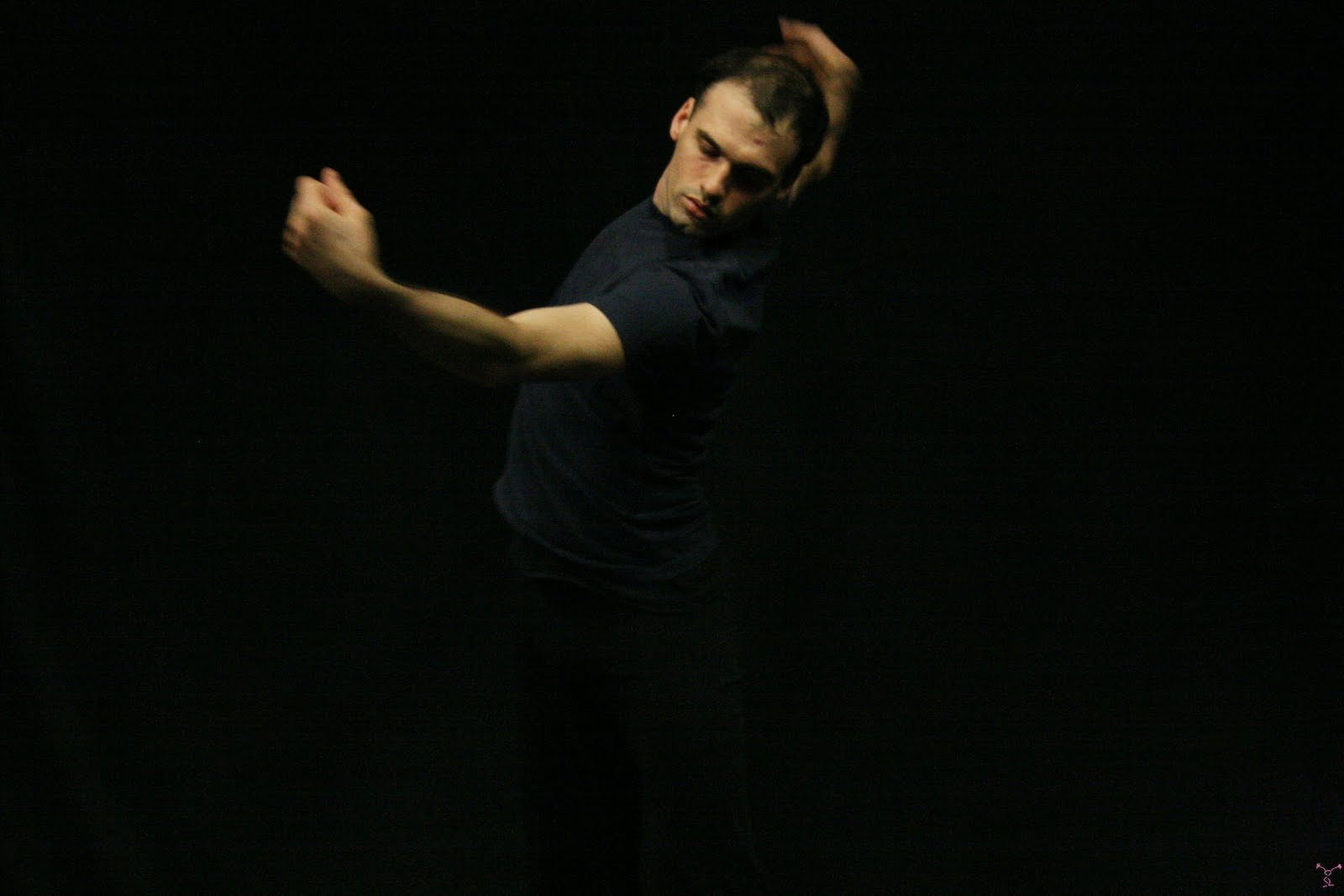
Chris Elam - Dancing

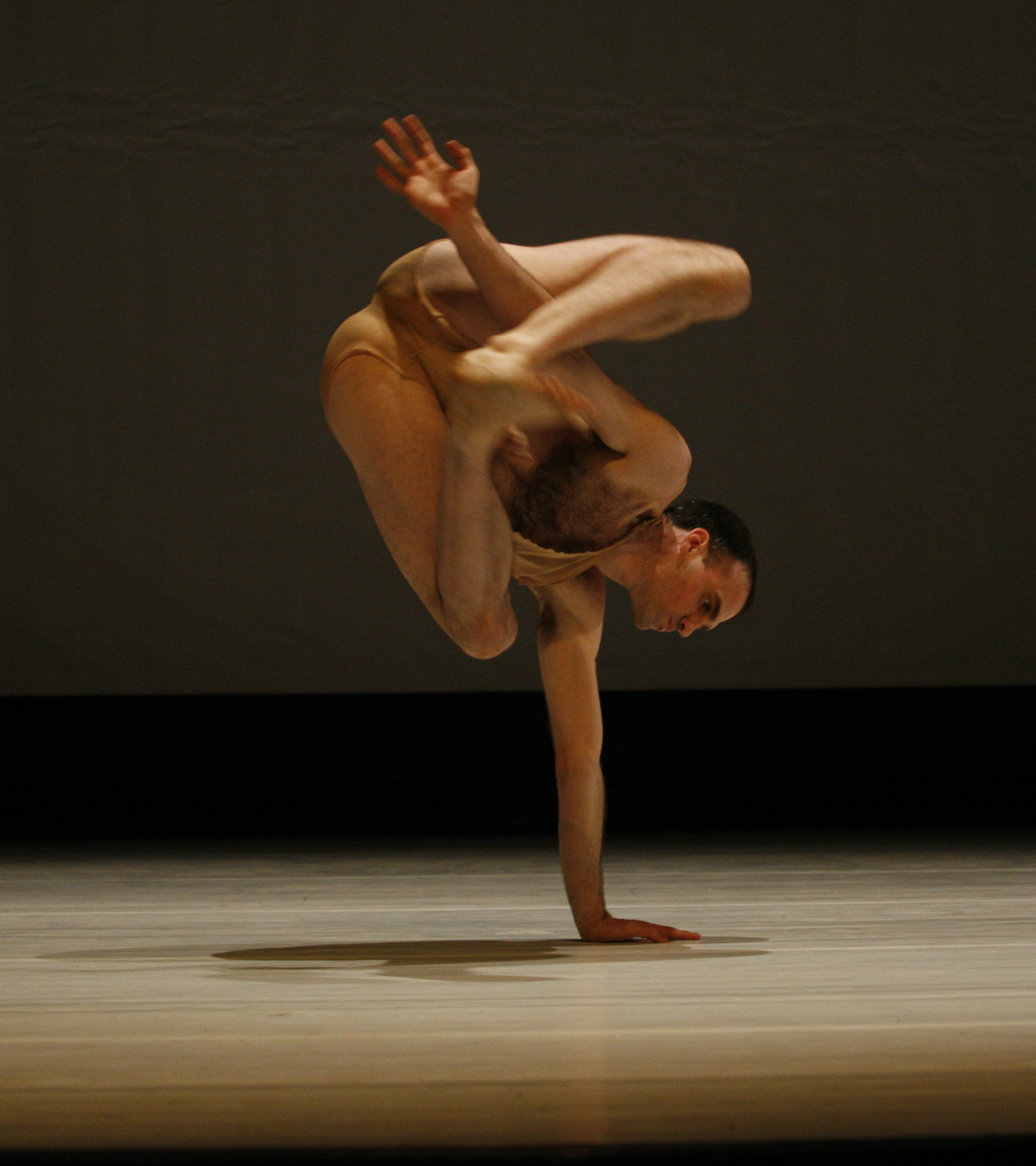
Chris Elam - Dance Photo
