= Koen Onzia =

Belgian ballet dancer and dance teacher (born 1961)

Koen Onzia (born 1961 in Geel) is a Belgian ballet dancer and dance teacher.

In 1979, he won a gold medal at the Prix de Lausanne.

Onzia was a soloist with Béjart Ballet Lausanne.
