= Misnomer Dance Theater =

American dance company

Misnomer Dance Theater is a modern dance company based in Brooklyn, New York. Founded in 1998 by artistic director and choreographer Chris Elam, the company was an early proponent of using videos and the Internet to reach a broader audience. It also experimented with motion capture technology, as well as green screen technology to engage online viewers, inviting them to superimpose themselves into rehearsals and performances.

== Critical reception ==
An early 2002 review in Back Stage described Elam's style as "sculpt[ing] himself and his company of agile dancers into improbable shapes with body parts sprouting from unexpected places and intertwining into visually striking designs". A 2008 review in The New York Times stated that Misnomer's performance of "Being Together", featuring three dances depicting ways of connecting, as "deal[ing] with the subject matter in all too earnest terms".
