= Nelly van Bommel =

French choreographer

Nelly van Bommel is a choreographer born in France to Dutch parents. She emigrated to the United States in 2002. As of 2012 she was a visiting assistant professor at SUNY Purchase and by 2020 she was Director of their Conservatory.
