= Andrea Miller (dancer) =

American dancer

Andrea Miller is an American dancer. She is the founder of Gallim Dance.
