= Ballet Arizona =

Professional dance troupe

Ballet Arizona is a professional ballet company in Phoenix, Arizona directed by Daniela Cardim. The company was created in 1986 by a merger of three smaller Arizonan dance companies that were struggling to survive. Today, the company of thirty-one dancers occupies a prominent place in American ballet. The company is also integrated into the School of Ballet Arizona.

== History ==
Allen Rosenberg, a Phoenix philanthropist and arts supporter, orchestrated in 1986 a fusion of the Phoenix Ballet, Arizona Dance Theater, and Ballet West Arizona (originally Arizona Metropolitan Ballet), all of which were in difficulties due to a lack of funding and audience. The company was originally directed by Jean-Paul Comelin, formerly with Milwaukee Ballet and Stuttgart Ballet, and New Zealand dancer Malcolm Burn. Burn left soon thereafter, and the company was guided through its early success by Comelin until 1992, when Michael Uthoff became artistic director. During the 1990s the company continued to grow, until it was beset with financial trouble in 1999. In September 2000, Ballet Arizona narrowly escaped shutting down due to severe debts, and was resurrected at the last moment by a wild funding campaign. Ib Andersen was named artistic director in May 2000, and has held that position ever since. Andersen reshaped the company and greatly expanded their repertory, adding a number of works by George Balanchine as well as pieces of his own choreography. In 2004, Kevin Myers was appointed Management Consultant to head the administrative division, and one year later the company eliminated its debt.

== Performances ==
Ballet Arizona has a wide repertory of works by well-known choreographers such as Balanchine, Christopher Wheeldon, and Twyla Tharp. Artistic Director Andersen also choreographs his own works for the company, and has reinterpreted many classical ballets including Coppélia, Romeo and Juliet, Swan Lake, and The Nutcracker. In October and November 2008, the company presented Andersen's new version of A Midsummer Night's Dream.

The company performs regularly at Phoenix Symphony Hall and the Orpheum Theatre. "Pre-Performance Chats" are offered before all performances except The Nutcracker. Each performing season is kicked off with a series of free, outdoor performances known as "Ballet Under the Stars". The company has an active volunteer organization known as the "Esprit de Corps," which provides a number of services including hosting the company's annual Nutcracker Party.

== Company ==
Ballet Arizona as of September 2021.

=== Dancers ===
- Jillian Barrell
- Alli Chester
- Juliette Jones
- Katelyn May
- Isabella Seo
- Gabriel Wright
- Demitra Bereveskos
- Rachel Gehr
- Colleen Hoopes
- Nayon Iovino
- Eastlyn Jensen
- Helio Lima
- Katherine Loxtercamp
- Kaelyn Magee
- Arianni Martin
- Atsunari Matsuyama
- Alberto Morales Perez
- Randy Pacheco
- Alberto Penalver
- Abby Phillips Maginity
- Ethan Price
- Serafin Castro
- Tiffany Chatfield
- Luis Corrales
- Sarah Diniz
- Natalie Ramirez
- Alison Remmers
- Ricardo Santos
- Sasha Vincett

== School ==
The School of Ballet Arizona is the academy affiliated with the company. The school teaches dance to over 100 students, which consist of ages 3 all the way to adulthood. The school gained its first full-time director, Kee-Juan Han, in 1993. Then, Nancy Crowley became the director from 2003 to 2010. Now, the school is directed by artistic director Ib Andersen. Students of the academy perform in an annual spring performance and The Nutcracker. The school is also involved with the Arizona School for the Arts through after-school programs and performances, and a previous home study program: Arizona Academics for Performing Arts. The school has taught a large number of students that have moved on to perform for companies such as The Ailey School and The School of American Ballet.
