= BalletMet =

Ballet Company from Ohio, USA

General information
- Name: BalletMet
- Previous names: Ballet Metropolitan, Ballet Metropolitan Columbus
- Founder: Daryl Kamer
- Website: balletmet.org

Senior staff
- Executive director: Sue Porter

Artistic staff
- Artistic director: Remi Wörtmeyer

Other
- Official school: BalletMet Academy
- Formation: 1978

BalletMet is an American ballet company and training program based in Columbus, Ohio. Located in downtown Columbus, BalletMet facilities include a black box theatre performance space, eight dance studios, administrative offices, and costume and scene shops.

BalletMet's professional company stages 60 to 70 performances each year in Columbus and on tour. In the past, the company has toured 28 U.S. states and internationally to Russia, Poland, Egypt, Spain and Canada. Remi Wortmeyer has led the company as the artistic director for the last 3 years.

BalletMet operates a dance academy that instructs about 1,500 students of all ages yearly. Classes offered include ballet, tap, modern, and Pilates. The current Academy Director is Maria Torija, a former professional dancer with Berlin State Ballet.

BalletMet developed DanceReach, a series of educational and outreach programs serving nearly 50,000 people annually. The DanceReach program offers up to 60 scholarships each year to talented youth, many from minority and under-served groups, who could not otherwise participate in dance training.

The current company came into existence in July 1978, with a $200,000 grant from the Battelle Memorial Institute Foundation. At that time it consisted of three staff and 12 dancers, and soon hired Wayne Soulant as its first artistic director. By 1997, the company had expanded to 25 dancers. The current company consists of 28 dancers and a second company of 8 dancers.

== Professional Company ==
BalletMet's main focus is an ensemble professional Company consisting of 27-28 dancers, depending on the season. BalletMet does not rank its dancers (ex. corps, demi-soloist, soloist, prima). The dancers are all members of AGMA. The repertoire is rooted in classical ballet techniques yet ranges greatly, often showcasing contemporary ballet work or postmodern influences in the same seasons as classics like The Nutcracker. This diversity of repertoire, unusual for American ballet companies, requires a strong ballet foundation and experience with other forms to perform successfully. Audience members thus enjoy a variety of artistic offerings each season.

BalletMet has an associated pre-professional company, BalletMet 2. BalletMet 2 performs with the Company in select shows throughout the season as well as in local schools. BalletMet 2 dancers are selected during Company auditions.

=== Current Dancers ===
BalletMet's current Company consists of the following dancers:

- Erica Alvarado
- Miguel Anaya
- Kira Anderson
- Narciso Alejandro Medina Arias
- TyLeigh Baughman
- Jessica Brown
- Maria Karla Iglesias Buela
- Leiland Charles
- Mila DeCola
- Francesca Dugarte
- Zachary Guthier
- Vincent Van Harris
- Sumi Ichikawa
- Arsentii Lazarev
- Miguel Wansing Lorrio
- Sophie Miklosovic
- Sophie Mossa
- Austin Powers
- Grace-Anne Powers
- Cesar Ramirez
- Andrew Rossi
- Jordan Sheppard
- Alvin Tovstogray
- David Ward
- Victoria Watford
- Claire Wessells
- Katelyn Yang
- Joan Sebastian Zamora

=== BalletMet 2 ===
*Samson Arthur
- Charlotte Blake
- Constance Cabanes
- Graydon George
- William Hanford
- Phoebe Ing
- Emma Shinn
- Alaina Warren

== Artistic Directors ==
- Wayne Soulant (1978–86)
- John McFall (1986–94)
- David Nixon (1994-2001)
- Gerard Charles (2001–2012)
- Edwaard Liang (2013–2024)
- Remi Wörtmeyer (2024-Present)
