= Christopher Stowell =

American ballet dancer and choreographer (born 1966)

- Born: 1966 (age 59–60); New York City
- Occupations: Ballet dancer; Choreographer; Artistic director; Associate Artistic Director
- Career
- Current group: Royal Winnipeg Ballet
- Former groups: National Ballet of Canada; San Francisco Ballet; Oregon Ballet Theatre

Christopher Stowell (born 1966) is an American ballet dancer and choreographer. He is currently the artistic director of the Royal Winnipeg Ballet. He was formerly the associate artistic director of the National Ballet of Canada for six years. He was previously the artistic director of the Oregon Ballet Theatre. Before that, he danced professionally with the San Francisco Ballet for sixteen years.

== Early life and education ==
Born in New York City, he is the son of Kent Stowell and Francia Russell, who were dancers with New York City Ballet. At the age of four he moved to Germany with his parents, who danced with the Bavarian State Ballet in Munich and then became the artistic directors of the Frankfurt Ballet. He moved back to the United States in 1977, when his parents became the founding artistic directors of the Pacific Northwest Ballet. Christopher trained with the Pacific Northwest Ballet School in Seattle and the School of American Ballet in New York.

== Career ==
Stowell joined the San Francisco Ballet (SFB) in 1985, where he became a principal dancer in 1990. He performed in ballets such as Romeo and Juliet, Swan Lake, The Sleeping Beauty, and Othello. Stowell appeared in most of SFB's productions of George Balanchine's ballets and danced roles created for him by choreographers such as Mark Morris, William Forsythe, James Kudelka, and SFB's artistic director Helgi Tómasson. Other venues he performed at include Lincoln Center in New York, the Kennedy Center in Washington D.C., the Bolshoi Theatre in Moscow, and the Paris Opera. He retired from the San Francisco Ballet in April 2001.

He then worked as a teacher and coach in San Francisco, New York, Europe, and Japan. He choreographed new ballets for the San Francisco Ballet, the Pacific Northwest Ballet, the Pennsylvania Ballet, and the Diablo Ballet.

Stowell joined the Oregon Ballet Theatre as artistic director in July 2003. His additions to the company's repertoire include ballets by Balanchine, Jerome Robbins, Christopher Wheeldon, Paul Taylor, Lar Lubovitch, Frederick Ashton, and Helgi Tómasson. Stowell has also commissioned works from choreographers such as Trey McIntyre, James Kudelka, Julia Adam and Kent Stowell. By the end of the 2010-2011 season, Stowell had added 50 new works, 20 of which were world premieres.

In 2004, Stowell was named one of "25 to Watch" by Dance Magazine.
