= Oregon Ballet Theatre =

Ballet company in Portland, Oregon, United States

Coordinates: 45.517051°N 122.659619°W

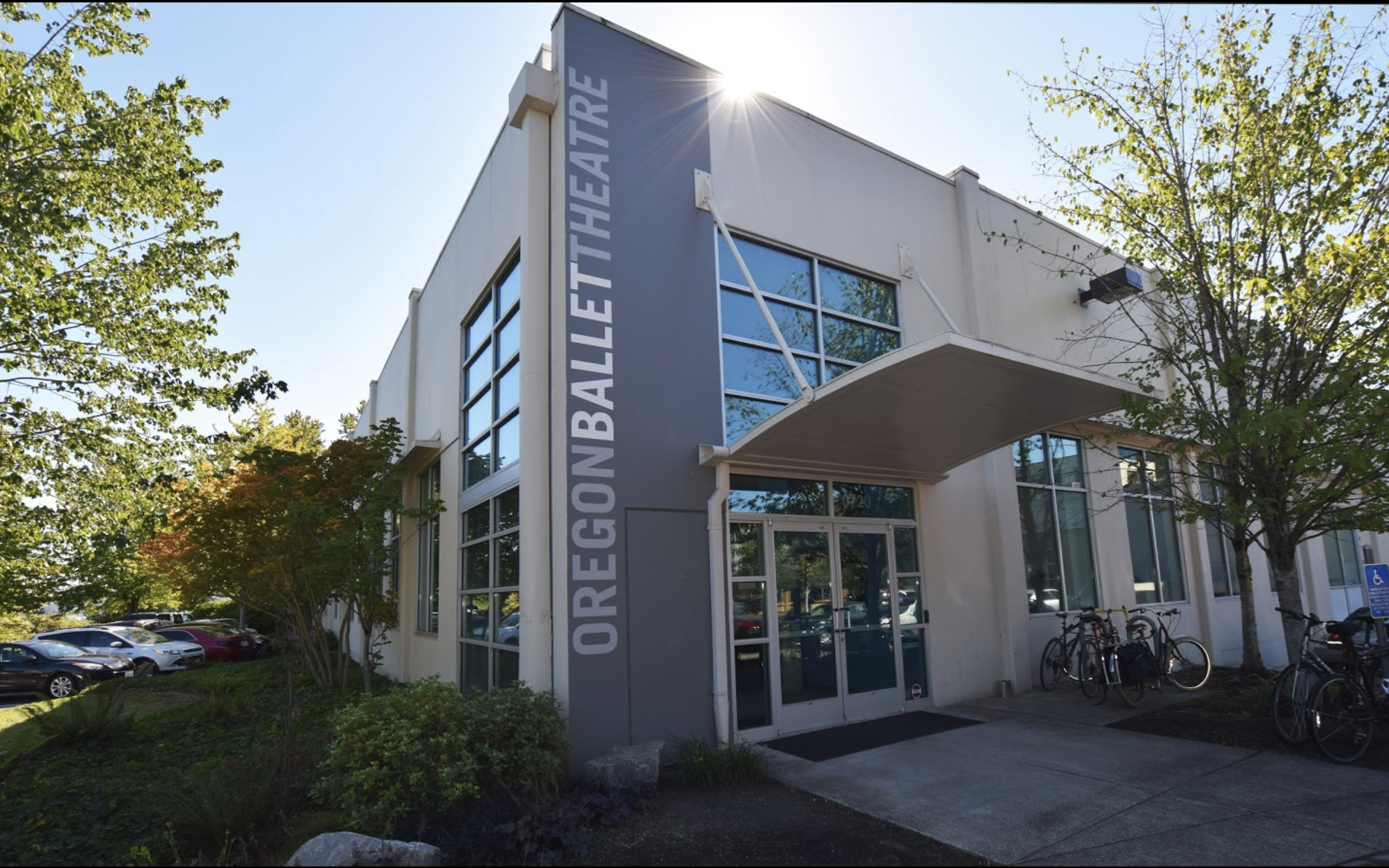
Oregon Ballet Theatre headquarters.

Oregon Ballet Theatre (OBT) is a ballet company in Portland, Oregon, United States. The company performs an annual five-program season at Portland's Centers for the Arts and conducts regional and national tours. It was featured in the October/November 2007 issue of Pointe magazine, with principal dancer Kathi Martuza on the cover.

== History ==
The company is the result of the 1989 merger of Ballet Oregon and Pacific Ballet Theater. James Canfield, a former dancer with Joffrey Ballet and principal dancer with Pacific Ballet Theater, served as Artistic Director of Oregon Ballet Theater from its inception until 2003. Under his leadership the company repertoire grew to comprise over 80 ballets, from evening-length works to contemporary pieces.

=== Stowell ===
Christopher Stowell was the artistic director from 2003 to the end of 2012. During Stowell's tenure, the company added the work of Sir Frederick Ashton, Jerome Robbins, William Forsythe, Lar Lubovitch, and Christopher Wheeldon to its repertoire. New works have been created on the company by James Kudelka, Trey McIntyre, Yuri Possokhov, Julia Adam, and Nicolo Fonte. In addition, Christopher Stowell choreographed eight new ballets with the company's dancers.

== Company ==
=== Artistic Directors ===
- Danielle Rowe (2023-Present)
- Peter Franc (Interim 2021-2023)
- Kevin Irving (2013–2021)
- Anne Mueller (Interim 2012-2013)
- Christopher Stowell (2003-2012)
- James Canfield (1989-2003)

== Production Department ==
- N. James Whitehill III, Production Manager (1992-1996)
- John McIntosh, Technical Director
- Leticia Baratta, Principal Stage Manager

== Oregon Ballet Theatre School ==
=== School Directors ===
- Katarina Svetlova (Interim) (2022-present)
- Marion Tonner (2018–2022)
- Anthony Jones (2013-2018)
- Damara Bennett (2003-2013)
- Haydee Gutierrez (1990-2003)
- Joseph Wyatt (1989)

== See also ==
- List of Oregon Ballet Theatre performers
