= Jason Ardizzone-West =

American scenic designer

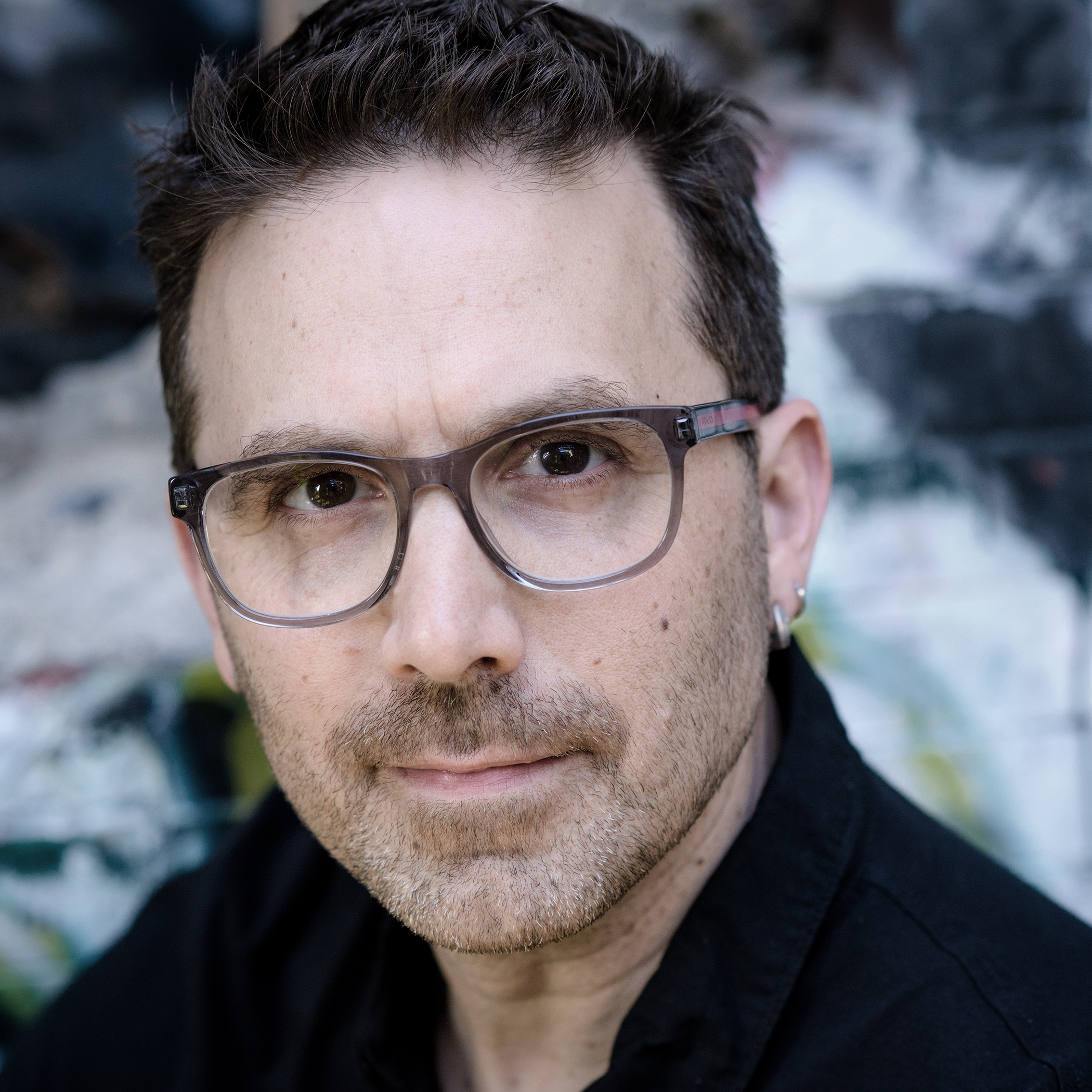
Jason Ardizzone-West

Jason Ardizzone-West is an American scenic designer, production designer, and architect. He received the 2018 Emmy Award for Outstanding Production Design for a Variety Special for Jesus Christ Superstar Live (NBC Universal).

== Personal life & education ==
Ardizzone-West grew up in Worcester, Massachusetts, where he got his start in scenic design creating sets for the former Worcester Forum Theatre Ensemble at age 15. His parents are Wendy and Richard Ardizzone, respectively the founder and associate director of a Worcester children's music education program, The Joy Of Music Program. He began designing sets professionally at Worcester Forum Theatre while attending high school at Doherty Memorial High School. He graduated from high school in 1990 and then went on to earn a Bachelor of Architecture from Cornell University, College of Architecture, Art & Planning in 1995. After completing his undergraduate degree, Jason Ardizzone-West worked for Mitchell Kurtz Architect PC.

He earned a Masters of Fine Arts from New York University Tisch School of the Arts, Department of Design for Stage and Film in 2012.

Ardizzone-West lives in Scarsdale, New York, with his wife, Jeni and two children, named Hudson and Lucca.

== Professional Work ==
Broadway

- 2025 Redwood, The Nederlander Theatre, conceived by Tina Landau & Idina Menzel, book by Tina Landau, music by Kate Diaz, directed by Tina Landau.

Off Broadway

- 2026 Blood Love, Theater 555, directed by Hunter Bird, NY Premiere
- 2026 creation stories and all the important importants, Lincoln Center Theater] directed by Tamilla Woodard, World Premiere
- 2026 We'll See, The Public Theater, directed by Richard Nelson, World Premiere
- 2025 House of McQueen, The Mansion at Hudson Yards, directed by Sam Helfrich, World Premiere
- 2025 The Wash, New Federal Theatre, directed by Awoye Timpo
- 2025 A Freeky Introduction, Atlantic Theater Company, written & performed by NSangou Njikam, directed by Dennis Allen II
- 2025 The Swamp Dwellers, Theatre for a New Audience, written by Wole Soyinka, directed by Awoye Timpo
- 2024 Syncing Ink, The Apollo's Victoria Theater, directed by [Awoye Timpo
- 2023 Monsoon Wedding, St. Ann's Warehouse, conceived & directed by Mira Niar
- 2023 shadow/land, The Public Theater, written by Erika Dickerson-Despenza, directed by Candis C. Jones
- 2023 Elyria, Atlantic Theater Company, written by Deepa Purohit, directed by Awoye Timpo
- 2022 Wedding Band, Theatre for a New Audience, written by Alice Childress, directed by Awoye Timpo
- 2021 What Happened?: The Michaels Abroad, The Hunter Theatre Project, directed by Richard Nelson
- 2020 Common, Bluebird Memories, Audible @ The Minetta Lane, directed by Awoye Timpo
- 2019 The Michaels, The Public Theater, written & directed by Richard Nelson
- 2018 Good Grief, Vineyard Theatre, written by Ngozi Anyanwu, directed by Awoye Timpo
- 2017 Illyria, The Public Theater, written & directed by Richard Nelson
- 2016 Women Of A Certain Age, The Public Theater, written & directed by Richard Nelson
- 2016 What Did You Expect?, The Public Theater, written & directed by Richard Nelson
- 2015 Hungry, The Public Theater, written & directed by Richard Nelson

Regional Theater

- 2026 Grease, The Village Theater, directed by Lisa Shriver
- 2026 Hair, Tantrum Theater, directed by Robert Barry Fleming
- 2026 Adia & Clora Snatch Joy, The Huntington Theater, directed by Awoye Timpo, world premiere
- 2025 Deceived, Bay Street Theater, directed by Sheryl Kaller
- 2025 Nobody Loves You, American Conservatory Theater (A.C.T.), directed by Pam MacKinnon
- 2025 The Grove, Huntington Theatre Company, written by Mfoniso Udofia, directed by Awoye Timpo
- 2024 Sojourners, Huntington Theatre Company, written by Mfoniso Udofia, directed by Dawn M Simmons
- 2024 The Importance of Being Earnest, Pittsburgh Public Theater & Baltimore Center Stage, written by Oscar Wilde, adapted & directed by Jenny Koons
- 2024 Redwood, La Jolla Playhouse, written & directed by Tina Landau
- 2024 I Am Delivered’t, Dallas Theater Center, written by Jonathan Norton, directed by Robert Barry Fleming
- 2023 Scrooge! The Musical, Arizona Theatre Company, directed by Mathew August
- 2023 Party People, Actor’s Theatre of Louisville, by Universes, directed by Steven Sapp
- 2023 Our Town, Syracuse Stage, directed by Bob Hupp
- 2023 K-I-S-S-I-N-G, Huntington Theatre Company, written by Lenelle Moïse, directed by Dawn M. Simmons
- 2022 From The Mississippi Delta, Westport Country Playhouse, directed by Goldie Patrick
- 2022 Grace, Ford’s Theatre, by Nolan Williams Jr & Nikkole Salter, directed by Robert Barry Fleming
- 2022 The Bluest Eye, Huntington Theatre Company, directed by Awoye Timpo
- 2020 Ordinary Days, Pittsburgh Playhouse, written by Adam Gwon, directed by Dave Solomon
- 2020 Bliss, 5th Avenue Theatre, directed by Sheryl Kaller
- 2020 School Girls, Or The African Mean Girls Play, Berkeley Repertory Theatre, directed by Awoye Timpo
- 2019 Once On This Island, Actors Theatre of Louisville & Cincinnati Playhouse, directed by Robert Barry Fleming
- 2018 Uncle Vanya, The Old Globe & Hunter Theater Project, translated & directed by Richard Nelson

Concerts / TV / Film / Tours

- 2026 XG, XG World Tour: The Core, Loudbox
- 2026 BIGBANG, XX: Cosmos World Tour, Loudbox, with Es Devlin
- 2025 Phish, Milk, New Year's Eve, Madison Square Garden, directed by Lisa Shriver
- 2025 Lady Gaga, Mayhem, Coachella, Mexico City, Rio de Janeiro, Singapore, with Es Devlin
- 2025 Lady Gaga, The Mayhem Ball, Loudbox, with Es Devlin
- 2025 HAIM, I Quit Tour, Loudbox
- 2025 John Batiste, The Big Money Tour, Loudbox
- 2025 Kali Uchis, The Tonight Show Starring Jimmy Fallon, directed by Harriet Cuddeford
- 2025 Jesus Christ Superstar, Hollywood Bowl, directed by Sergio Trujillo
- 2025 Dua Lipa, Radical Optimism Tour
- 2024 Hikaru Utada, Science Fiction Tour
- 2024 Dua Lipa, Saturday Night Live
- 2023 Phish, Gamehendge 2023, Madison Square Garden
- 2023 Usher, Rendezvous À Paris
- 2023 Pentatonix, The Most Wonderful Time of the Year Tour
- 2022-2023 Florence + The Machine, Dance Fever Tour, co-designed with Es Devlin
- 2022 Pentatonix, A Christmas Spectacular Tour
- 2022 Phish, New Years Eve 2022: 40 Years of Phish
- 2021 Amend: The Fight For America, Netflix, The Documentary Group, Overbrook Entertainment, hosted by Will Smith, directed by Kenny Leon
- 2021 Black Picture Show, Artists Space, written by Bill Gunn, directed by Awoye Timpo
- 2020 Common, Say Peace, The Tonight Show Starring Jimmy Fallon, directed by Awoye Timpo
- 2019 Blue Man Group, NETworks Presentations, directed by Jenny Koons
- 2020 Common, Bluebird Memories, Audible @ The Minetta Lane, directed by Awoye Timpo
- 2019 Dermot Kennedy, North American Tour
- 2018 Jesus Christ Superstar Live, NBC, directed by David Leveaux & Alex Rudzinski
- 2018 Lana Del Rey, LA To The Moon Tour
- 2018 Wandering City, The Brooklyn Academy of Music, written & performed by Ethel String Quartet
- 2015 Adele, Live in New York City, NBC, co-designed with Es Devlin
- 2015 Bullets Over Broadway, NETworks Presentations, directed by Susan Stroman

Dance

- 2025 The Woods, BalletCollective + Sam Fermin, choreographed by Troy Schumacher, World Premiere
- 2025 The Rite of Spring, Atlanta Ballet, choreographed by Claudia Schreier
- 2023 The Night Falls, Ballet Collective, choreographed by Troy Schumacher, written by Karen Russell, composed by Ellis Ludwig-Leone
- 2022 The Source, Miami City Ballet, choreographed by Claudia Schreier, directed by Adam Barrish

London

- 2025, The Hitchhikers Guide to the Galaxy, Riverside Studios, Myriad Entertainment, World Premiere
- 2026, Already Perfect, King's Head Theatre, directed by Dave Solomon, World Premiere
- 2026, Bliss, Edinburgh Festival Fringe, Pleasance Courtyard, direct

== Awards ==
Year	Award	Category	Work	Result
2025	Elliot Norton Awards	Outstanding Scenic Design, Large Theater	The Grove (Huntington Theater Company)	Nominated
2025	Elliot Norton Awards	Outstanding Scenic Design, Large Theater	Sojourners (Huntington Theater Company)	Nominated
2024	Lucille Lortel	Outstanding Scenic Design	shadow/land (The Public Theater)	Nominated
2018	Emmy Awards	Outstanding Production Design for a Variety Special	Jesus Christ Superstar Live (NBC)	Won
2019	Art Directors Guild Awards 2018	Excellence In Production Design Award	Jesus Christ Superstar Live (NBC)	Nominated
2022	Elliot Norton Awards	Outstanding Design	The Bluest Eye (Huntington Theatre Company)	Nominated
2022	Audelco Awards	Best Set Design	Wedding Band ( (Theatre for a New Audience)	Nominated
2023	Outer Critics Circle Awards	Outstanding Scenic Design (play or musical)	Wedding Band ( Theatre for a New Audience)	Nominated
2023	Drama Desk Awards	Outstanding Scenic Design of a Play	Wedding Band ( Theatre for a New Audience)	Nominated
2023	Elliot Norton Awards	Outstanding Scenic Design	K-I-S-S-I-N-G ( Huntington Theatre Company)	Nominated
2023	Broadway World - Washington DC Awards	Best Scenic Design	Grace ( Ford's Theatre)	Won
