= Satellite Collective =

Artist collective in New York City, USA

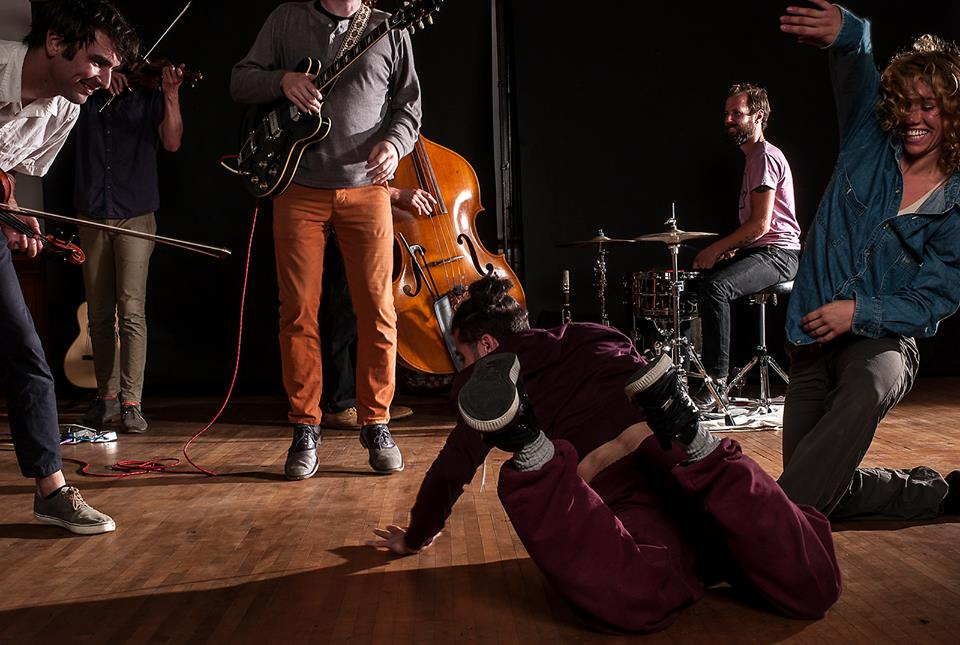
- Satellite Collective works are developed during summer residencies at the Satellite Gallery. Dancers Isaies Perez and Elena Valls work with musicians Nathan Langston, Stelth Ulvang and Nick Jaina in 2014.
- Predecessor: Satellite Gallery, Satellite Ballet
- Formation: 5 January 2010
- Founded at: New York City, NY
- Purpose: Live performances of dance, original music, spoken word, short film, multimedia, and architecture; a literature and arts magazine focused on the conversation between artists, writers and place; an international arts experiment : artists in 159 cities and 42 countries pass a message from art form to art form

Satellite Collective is a non-profit, multi-medium artist collective based in New York City and led by Kevin Draper. Functioning as an “arts incubator”, Satellite Collective generates accessible creative opportunities for artists in the performing and visual arts. Satellite Collective builds global artist coalitions to achieve innovative art exhibitions, structured by intersecting diverse mediums of art. Contributing artists of Satellite Collective are writers, poets, composers, musicians, choreographers, dancers, digital artists, photographers, and designers whose collaborative projects emerge as multimedia ballet performances, a musician ensemble, and an online periodical. Satellite Collective has received press attention from The New York Times and The New Yorker.

== Projects ==
=== Satellite Ballet ===
Satellite Ballet was founded in 2010 by Kevin Draper and Troy Schumacher after they met by chance at their apartment building in New York City and began to create an experimental ballet. Draper's surrealistic poetry served as the interpretative foundation of Schumacher's choreography, an unconventional technique that transcended the typical method of developing choreography based on a piece of music. Draper then introduced Schumacher to composer Nick Jaina, who had previously performed at Draper's art venue in Michigan. Soon after, the three artists began collaborating with other artists on the ballet project: these artists became the founding artists of the Satellite Ballet. The founding artists agreed to an egalitarian structure in which all the artists and their diverse mediums of art were equal and deserved equal representation in projects. For the first few years, the artists collaborated under the name Satellite Ballet but after Schumacher split from Satellite Ballet in 2013 to begin his own company, Satellite Collective reformed under new choreographers and performs under the name Satellite Collective.

=== Satellite Collective Performing Arts ===
Satellite Collective is a multi-medium exhibitive branch of the artist collective creating dance, literary works of poetry and librettos, musical compositions (Satellite Ensemble), digital art, film, photography, and spoken word. The collaborative process is very much present during the development of new works as artists employ technology to exchange ideas, concepts, and ideas. New dance, music, short film, multimedia, and spoken word projects are created each year by Satellite Collective, and these projects are first previewed through the Satellite Summer Residency at the Dogwood Center for Performing Arts in Fremont, Michigan; premiere performances are held in New York City – a seasonal structure established in earlier years with the Satellite Ballet. Satellite Collective has performed at Brooklyn Academy of Music and in 2014 as well as 2015, Satellite Collective was selected by the BAM/Devos Institute of Arts Management at Kennedy Center for the professional development program of Brooklyn Academy of Music.

=== Satellite Press Publishing and Transmission Magazine ===
Satellite Press is an independent publisher that promotes artistic literary publications reflective of collaborative efforts between artists and authors of prose, poetry, and visual art. Serving as the literary effort of Satellite Collective, Satellite Press publishes book length eBooks of both prose and poetry. Satellite Press publications are productions of a wide variety of collaborating artists - painters, filmmakers, sculptors, musicians, and photographers. Through unique interpretations of text, artists create artistic responses that contribute to the final publications. The Transmission Journal is an international online arts periodical dedicated to the conversation between artists and writers. Contributors to the Transmission Online Periodical include nationally reputable writers including Roy Scranton, Matt Gallagher, and Pedro Ponce.

=== Telephone International Arts Experiment ===
"Telephone" is an international arts exchange that globally joins artists. The program is curated and directed for Satellite Collective by Nathan Langston. This project operates much like the game telephone: artists of various mediums interpret the work of other artists with their own work, passing a single message from art form to art form. Telephone received international press coverage upon launch, driven by the global profile of its participating artists. W.J.T. Mitchell, speaking of the Telephone Game in the New York Times, noted that Telephone “is basically a performance of something that every artist already knows, which is that art is not made in solitude; it's made out of other art.” The New York Times indicated that although experiments in linking artists are not new, it has seldom been done at this scale.

=== Satellite Film ===
In 2012 Satellite began incorporating short film, video and stop motion animation into live performances. Satellite's first major short film, "Twin Star Event," was premiered by the Grand Rapids Art Museum (GRAM) for ArtPrize in 2014.

== Methods and processes ==
Satellite Collective produces projects by creating teams of artists who utilize collaboration directly on works with equal billing regardless of the core arts vertical in which the finished work may be categorized. This has challenged reviewers of the organization's performances, some of whom have argued that the individual art forms deserve singular focus and that the mixed form is perplexing, while others have argued that the mixed art forms are competing for attention. For instance, Creative Director Kevin Draper's projections have been called both "tacked on" and "intriguing". A typical performance of the Satellite Collective Performing Arts includes music, dance, spoken word, short film, multimedia and experimental lighting.

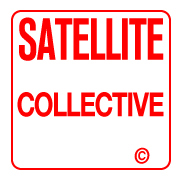
Satellite Collective Logo

== Works ==
From various sources.

Projects
Year	Title	Type	Collaborators
2017	Echo & Narcissus	immersive multi-disciplinary performance	Kevin Draper (writer) / Lora Robertson (Film Maker) / Daniel Applebaum (Director)
2016	Gran Jericho	architectural installation + short film + placemaking	Kevin Draper (architect) / Lora Robertson (film maker) / Site:Lab (collaborator)
2016	Maria's Garden	spoken word + soundscape	Kevin Draper (writer) / Nikhil Melnechuk (poet)
2016	Voicemail Message	dance + music + microtones + mobile set	Devin Alberda (choreographer) / Richie Greene (composer) / Kevin Draper (visual artist)
2016	Gran Jericho	short film + instrumental + vocal	Lora Robertson (Film Maker) / Stelth Ulvang (composer, songwriter) / Kevin Draper (writer)
2016	We Go	dance + instrumental score + mobile set	Marcus Willis (choreographer) / Aaron Severini (composer) / Kevin Draper (visual artist)
2016	View From the Ceiling	canvas/ink monoprint mobile set	Kevin Draper (visual artist) / Brandon Stirling Baker (design)
2015	A Pair of IDeal Landscapes	interdisciplinary dance + short film + original score	Lora Robertson (short film) / Richie Greene (score) / Esme Boyce (choreography) / Brandon Stirling Baker (lighting)
2015	Edie Leaves Twice	experimental short film + short film + libretto + original score	Kevin Draper (story) / Lora Robertson (stop motion animation) / Ellis Ludwig-Leone (Score)
2015	Walls	interdisciplinary dance + dance + multimedia + original score	Manuel Vignoulle (choreography) / Kevin Draper (multimedia) / Brandon Stirling Baker (lighting) / Nick Jaina, Amanda Lawrence (score)
2015	Individuate	ballet + strings + electric guitar	Devin Alberda (choreography) / Nick Jaina (score)
2015	I Can Help You	spoken word + music + soundscape	Kevin Draper, Stealth Ulvang (story) / Stealth Ulvang (lyrics) / Richie Greene, Nick Jaina (soundscape)
2015	Water	solo instrumental + multimedia imagery	David Moss (composition) / Kevin Draper (multimedia imagery)
2015	Time and Again	solo voice + multi instrument ensemble	Richie Greene (score)
2014	Emergence	dance + original score + film	Esme Boyce (choreography) / Lora Robertson (visual art) / Nick Jaina (score)
2014	Twin Star Event	short film + original score + silent libretto	Lora Robertson (short film) / Ellis Ludwig-Leone (original score)
2014	Rituals	ballet + original score + multimedia projections	Manuel Vignoulle (choreographer) / Nick Jaina (composer) / Kevin Draper (visual artist)
2014	Spoken Word	spoken word + soundscape + multimedia	Nathan Langston (poet) / Casey Kelbaugh (visual artist) / Nick Jaina (soundscape)
2013	Warehouse Under the Hudson	ballet + original score + photography + short film + multimedia projections + libretto	Troy Schumacher (choreography) / Nick Jaina, Nathan Langston, Amanda Lawrence, David Moss (original score) / Kevin Draper (librettist + multimedia projections) / Lora Robertson (photography + short film) / Brandon Stirling Baker (lighting)
2013	Thief	song cycle + multimedia projections	Kevin Draper (story + multimedia) / Nick Jaina (original score + lyrics) / Lora Robertson (multimedia)
2012	Epistasis	ballet + original score + photography + short film + multimedia projections + libretto	Troy Schumacher (choreography) / Nick Jaina, Nathan Langston, Amanda Lawrence, David Moss (original score) / Kevin Draper (librettist + multimedia projections) / Ellis Ludwig-Leone (arrangement) / Brandon Stirling Baker (lighting)
2012	Cosmonaut	song cycle + short film + silent libretto	Kevin Draper (libretto) / Lora Robertson (animation) / Nick Jaina, Paul Alcott, Nathan Langston, Amanda Lawrence (score and lyrics)
2011	Progress	ballet + original score + multimedia projections + silent libretto	Kevin Draper (libretto) / Troy Schumacher (choreography) / Kevin Draper (visual design) / Nick Jaina, Nathan Langston, Amanda Lawrence (original score)

== Official Links ==
- Official Website
