= Ellis Ludwig-Leone =

American composer and musician

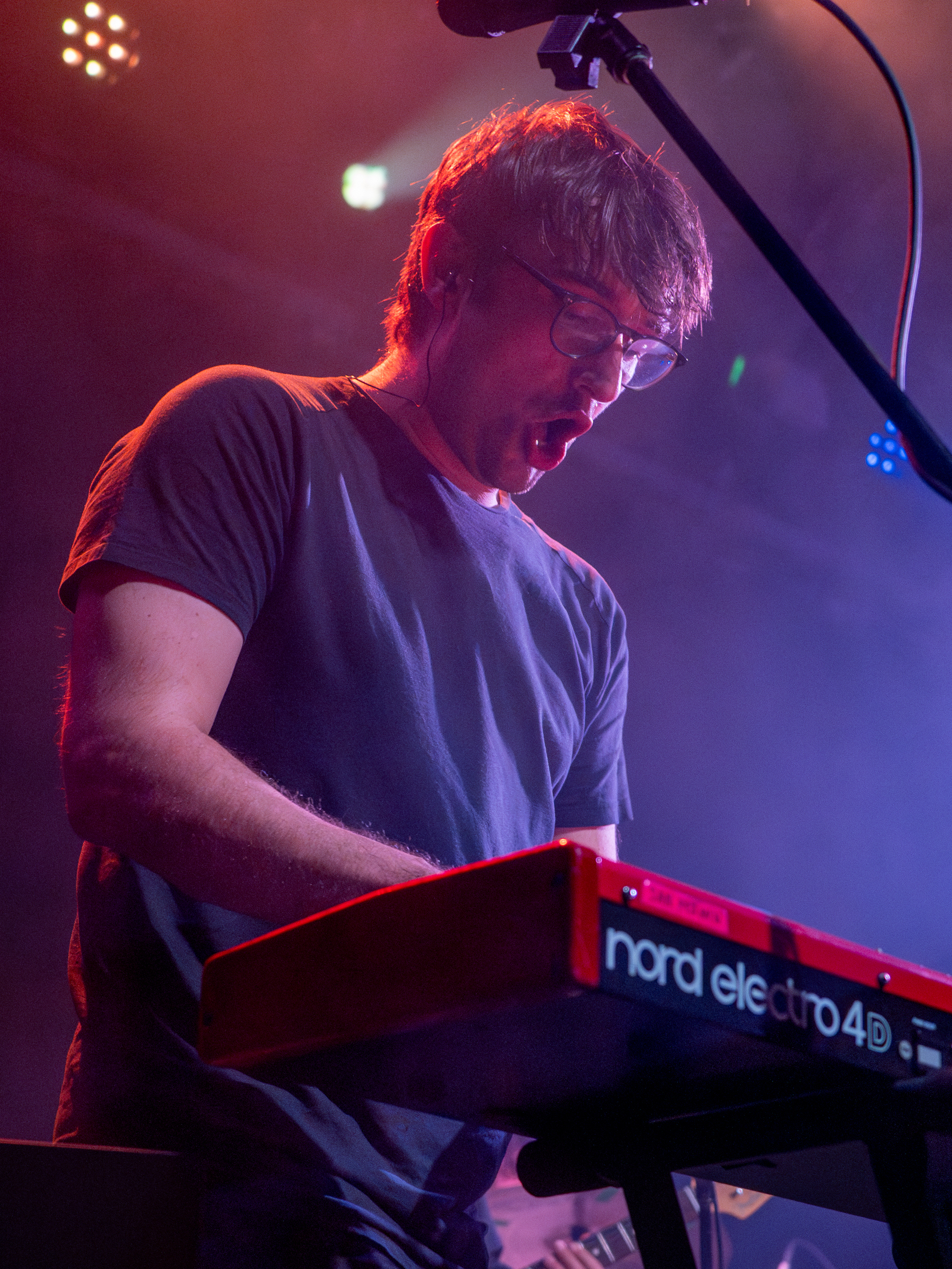
- Ludwig-Leone with San Fermin in 2025

Background information
- Born: 1989 (age 36–37); Rhode Island, U.S.
- Origin: Brooklyn, New York
- Genres: Contemporary classical; chamber pop; indie pop
- Occupations: Composer; musician
- Instruments: Piano; keyboards
- Years active: 2011–present
- Labels: Downtown Records; New Amsterdam; Sony Classical; Better Company
- Website: ellisludwigleone.com

Ellis Joseph Ludwig-Leone (born 1989) is an American composer and songwriter based in Brooklyn, New York. Since 2012, he has led the chamber pop group San Fermin with whom he has released four studio albums, most recently 2020's The Cormorant. Outside of San Fermin, he has composed for a wide variety of contemporary classical ensembles and organizations, including New York City Ballet, Indianapolis Symphony Orchestra, and Brooklyn Youth Chorus, and often works with choreographer Troy Schumacher, harpist Lavinia Meijer, Attacca Quartet, and singer-songwriter Allen Tate.

== Early life ==
Ellis Ludwig-Leone was born in Rhode Island in 1989 and was raised nearby in Berkley, Massachusetts, a rural community on Massachusetts' South Coast. His parents, who are both painters and former visual arts professors, raised him and his younger sister. Growing up, he studied classical piano and was in a string of high school rock bands. He also played competitive basketball. He met future collaborator and San Fermin-bandmate Allen Tate at a Berklee College of Music summer program when they were both fifteen years old.

Ludwig-Leone subsequently studied classical composition at Yale University, from which he received an undergraduate degree in 2011.

== Career ==
Ludwig-Leone began composing while studying at Yale, writing music for his bands and ensembles. When he was a junior, he began working as an assistant for composer Nico Muhly with whom he would an establish a lasting professional relationship. After graduating, he took part in an artistic residency at the secluded Banff Centre for Arts and Creativity in Alberta, Canada, during which he wrote most of the material that would become the record San Fermin. The album was released on Downtown Records in 2013 to critical acclaim and prompted the formation of an established eight-person band which has continuously toured since that time. As the group's songwriter and producer, Ludwig-Leone has written three other records for the group, Jackrabbit (2014), Belong (2017), and The Cormorant I & II (2020), among other releases.

Ludwig-Leone has written music for many ensembles including ACME, Colorado Music Festival Orchestra, Decoda, Fifth House Ensemble, Hotel Elefant, JACK Quartet, Metropolis Ensemble, and NOW Ensemble, and was the Composer-in-Residence for the Alabama Symphony Orchestra in their 2015 season. In addition, he has written ballets with choreographer Troy Schumacher for the New York City Ballet and BalletCollective.

In 2020, Ludwig-Leone founded the record label Better Company with Allen Tate and San Fermin manager Thomas Winkler.

Ludwig-Leone's influences include Sufjan Stevens, Miles Davis, Charles Ives, Paul Simon, Nico Muhly, Benjamin Britten, and The National.

== Compositions ==
Listed as title (year) artist – commissioner (if any).

Chamber

- Four Short Pieces for String Quartet (2011) for JACK Quartet
- Suite for Flute & Harp (2012) for Lavinia Meijer and Herman van Kogelenberg – Lavinia Meijer
- GROW (2012) for Decoda – Við Djúpið Festival
- The Impulse Wants Company (2013) for American Contemporary Music Ensemble – BalletCollective
- Dear and Blackbirds (2014) for Hotel Elefant – BalletCollective
- All That We See (2014) for Hotel Elefant – BalletCollective
- Invisible Divide (2015) for Hotel Elefant and Vanessa Upson – BalletCollective
- Until the Walls Cave In (2016) for Hotel Elefant – BalletCollective
- Simple Machine (2016) for NOW Ensemble – Ecstatic Music Festival
- Processional for a Doomed Wedding (2020) for Cecilia De Maria – Sony Classical
- Natural History (2020) for The Knights – BalletCollective
- Speech After the Removal of the Larynx (2021) for Attacca Quartet
- False We Hope (2021) for Eliza Bagg and Attacca Quartet

Orchestra

- How to Fake Your Death (2015) – Alabama Symphony Orchestra
- How to Fake Your Death (revision, 2016) – Indianapolis Symphony Orchestra
- Common Ground (2015) – New York City Ballet
- Shadowy Figures (2019) for Lavinia Meijer – Het Gelders Orkest

Choir

- Lying in a Field, Age 67 and Singing in a Chorus, Age 14 (2016) – Brooklyn Youth Chorus with Wild Up Orchestra
- Bloom and Round Dance (2017) – Manhattan Choral Ensemble
- Who What When Where Why (and a few other questions) (2018) – The Crossing
- Daphne (2020) – Brooklyn Youth Chorus
- To Look for Owls (2020) for Chamber Choir of Europe – Sony Classical

Solo

- Elaborate Monument (2011) (piano)
- Night Loops (2014) – Lavinia Meijer and Sony Classical
- Simpler Language (2016) – Lavinia Meijer
- Sanctuary (2017) for Simone Dinnerstein (piano) – Terezín Music Foundation

Songwriting

- San Fermin (2013) for San Fermin
- Jackrabbit (2015) for San Fermin
- "No Devil" (2015) for San Fermin
- "Shiver" (2016) for San Fermin and Sam Amidon; with Sam Amidon
- Belong (2017) for San Fermin
- "Asleep on the Train" (2017) for San Fermin
- The Cormorant I & II (2020) for San Fermin
- In this House (2020) for San Fermin; with various artists

Score

- The Great Work Begins - Scenes from Angels in America (2020) – Ellie Heyman, director
- Ledge (short film) (2021) – Alex Edelman, director

== Discography ==
=== San Fermin ===
- San Fermin (2013)
- Jackrabbit (2015)
- Belong (2017); co-produced with Peter Katis
- The Cormorant I & II (2020)

=== As composer ===
- Brooklyn Youth Chorus & International Contemporary Ensemble – "Lying in a Field, Age 67" and "Singing in a Chorus, Age 14" from Silent Voices (2016)
- Lavinia Meijer – "Night Loops" from (The Glass Effect (The Music of Philip Glass & Others) (2016)
- Lavinia Meijer & World Choir for Peace – "To Look for Owls" with Gereon Thesis from Peaceful Choir - New Sound of Choral Music (2020)

=== As arranger ===
- Allen Tate – Sleepwalker (2016); also producer
- Pure Bathing Culture – Hats (2020); also featured artist
- Wild Pink – A Billion Little Lights (2021)
