= San Fermin (band) =

American indie rock band

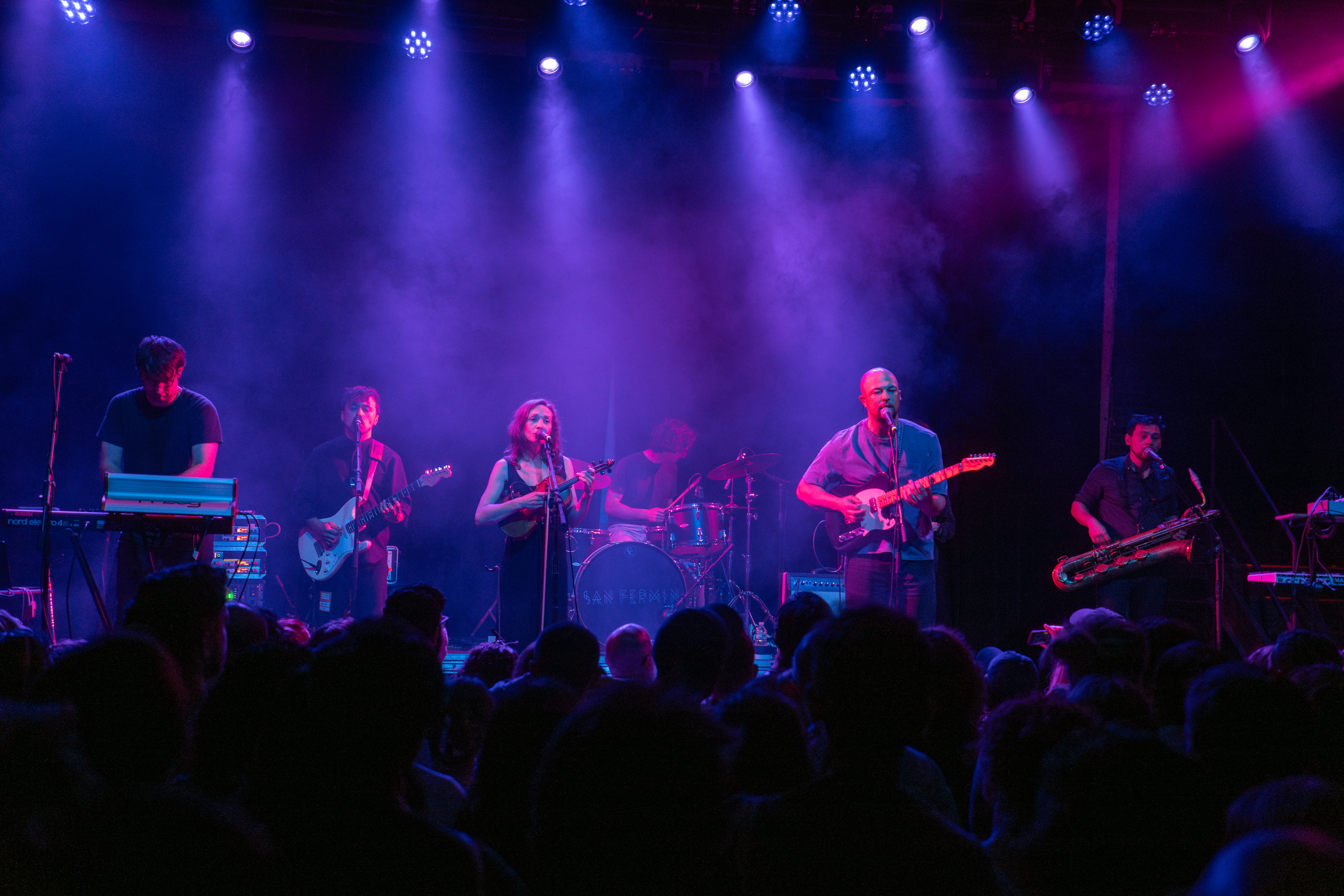
- San Fermin performing at in 2025

Background information
- Origin: Brooklyn, New York, United States
- Genres: Indie rock, chamber pop
- Years active: 2011–present
- Labels: Downtown Records, Interscope Records, Sony Masterworks, Better Company
- Members: Ellis Ludwig-Leone; Allen Tate; John Brandon; Stephen Chen; Tyler McDiarmid; Claire Wellin
- Past members: Michael Hanf; Rae Cassidy; Rebekah Durham; Charlene Kaye; Karlie Bruce
- Website: http://www.sanferminband.com

San Fermin is an American indie rock collective, led by Brooklyn-based composer and songwriter Ellis Ludwig-Leone. Known for combining indie rock, pop, and classical influences into lush compositions, they released their debut album San Fermin on Downtown Records in 2013. This was followed by the records Jackrabbit and Belong in 2015 and 2017, respectively. Their fourth album, a double album titled The Cormorant I & II, was released in full in March 2020. Their fifth studio album, Arms, was released in February 2024 and features a stripped-back sound and more personal lyrics.

San Fermin generally perform as an eight-piece group, pairing traditional rock instrumentation (electric guitar, keyboards, drums) with baritone saxophone, trumpet, and violin. The group has alternating lead vocalists, including co-founder Allen Tate and Claire Wellin.

== History ==
=== Origins ===
San Fermin took shape after Ludwig-Leone's graduation from Yale University, where he studied composition. While still in college, he assisted composer Nico Muhly, known for his work with Anohni and the Johnsons, Sufjan Stevens, and Grizzly Bear, on several film scores and operas. Despite being in several bands in high school and even some during college, Ludwig-Leone did not decide to focus on making pop music until the end of his college career: "I put on a concert with some new pieces I had written for female singers, and then we ended the night with some pop tunes from the band, for which I made these totally over-the-top arrangements. It was then I realized that I could bring these things together."

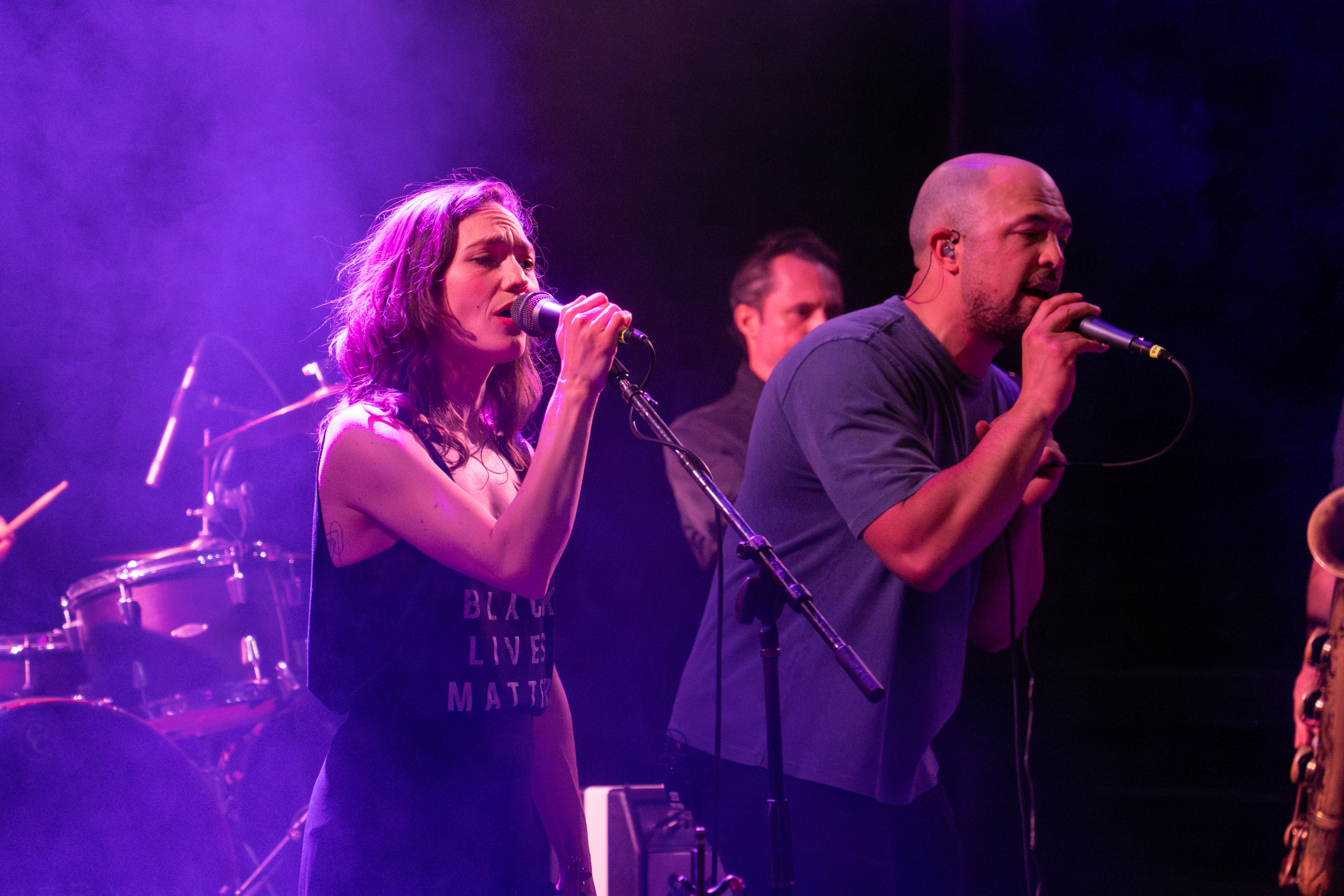
Claire Wellin and Allen Tate performing with San Fermin in 2025

=== San Fermin ===
After his graduation from Yale in 2011, Ludwig-Leone retreated to Canada's secluded Banff Centre, where he wrote what would eventually become San Fermin. He subsequently returned to New York and began recording what he intended to be a standalone project, completing the recording sessions during July 2012. It features performances by 22 musicians, including vocals from Ludwig-Leone's longtime collaborator Allen Tate, as well as Jess Wolfe and Holly Laessig of Lucius.

San Fermin released their lead single "Sonsick" on December 4, 2012, which Pitchfork gave a positive review, declaring the song "deliriously infectious." After debuting the record live in December, Ludwig-Leone received a record deal offer from Downtown Records that made him reconsider the scope of the San Fermin project. The full record was intended to be self-released in February 2013, but, after signing to Downtown Records, the release was pushed back first to June then to the September of that year.

San Fermin released their first album San Fermin on September 17, 2013, to positive reviews. NPR called the record "one of the year's most surprising, ambitious, evocative and moving records," praising Ludwig-Leone for his ability to write a collection of songs "as easy to love as they are to admire." Pitchfork also gave the album a positive review. The album reached #18 on the Billboard Top Heatseekers album chart.

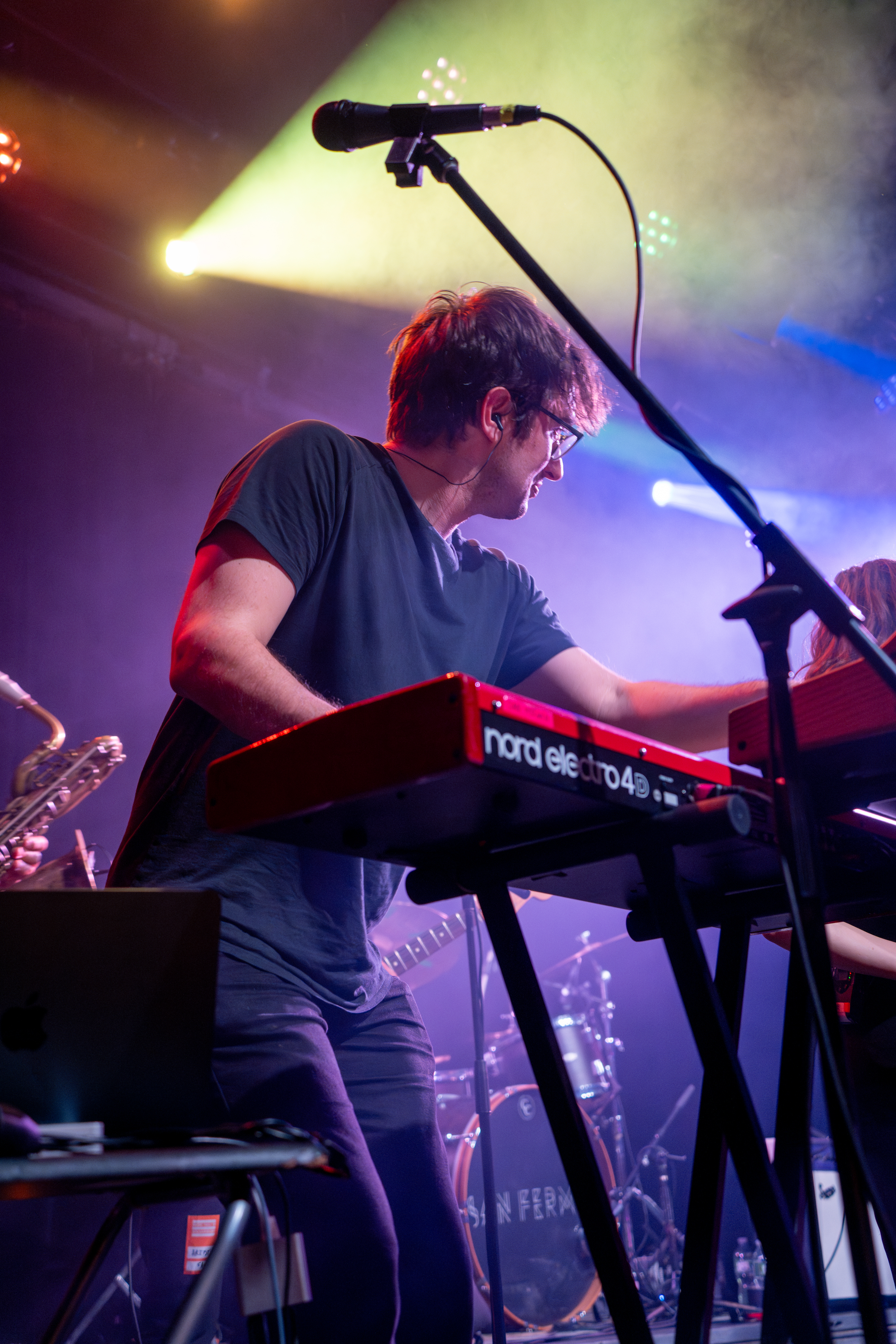
Ellis Ludwig-Leone performing with San Fermin in 2025

==== Establishing the collective ====
The first live performance of San Fermin was on December 19, 2012, at Piano's in New York City; the performance featured sixteen musicians including Ludwig-Leone. In the months following, the line-up and size of the band shifted; by Fall 2013, the collective settled as an eight-member touring group made up of both musicians who helped record San Fermin, including Tate, trumpeter John Brandon, and saxophonist Stephen Chen, as well as newly recruited members, namely vocalist Rae Cassidy, guitarist Tyler McDiarmid, percussionist Michael Hanf, and violinist Rebekah Durham. Eliza Bagg also toured as a violinist for the group during 2013.

While Cassidy's voice and style was a departure from those of the women of Lucius on the record, her interpretations of the songs have been praised by numerous critics, including Paul Krugman of The New York Times. The New Yorker recognized the musicianship of the entire eight-piece live ensemble, noting their ability to "deliver epic and emotion-laden rock, with glorious and operatic vocals, electronic break beats, horns, strings, and other flourishes."

On November 13, 2013, the eight-piece released a live EP Live At The Advent Lutheran Church NYC as a stripped-back companion to their debut album.

In April 2014, Cassidy left the band to focus on her solo career and was replaced by Charlene Kaye.

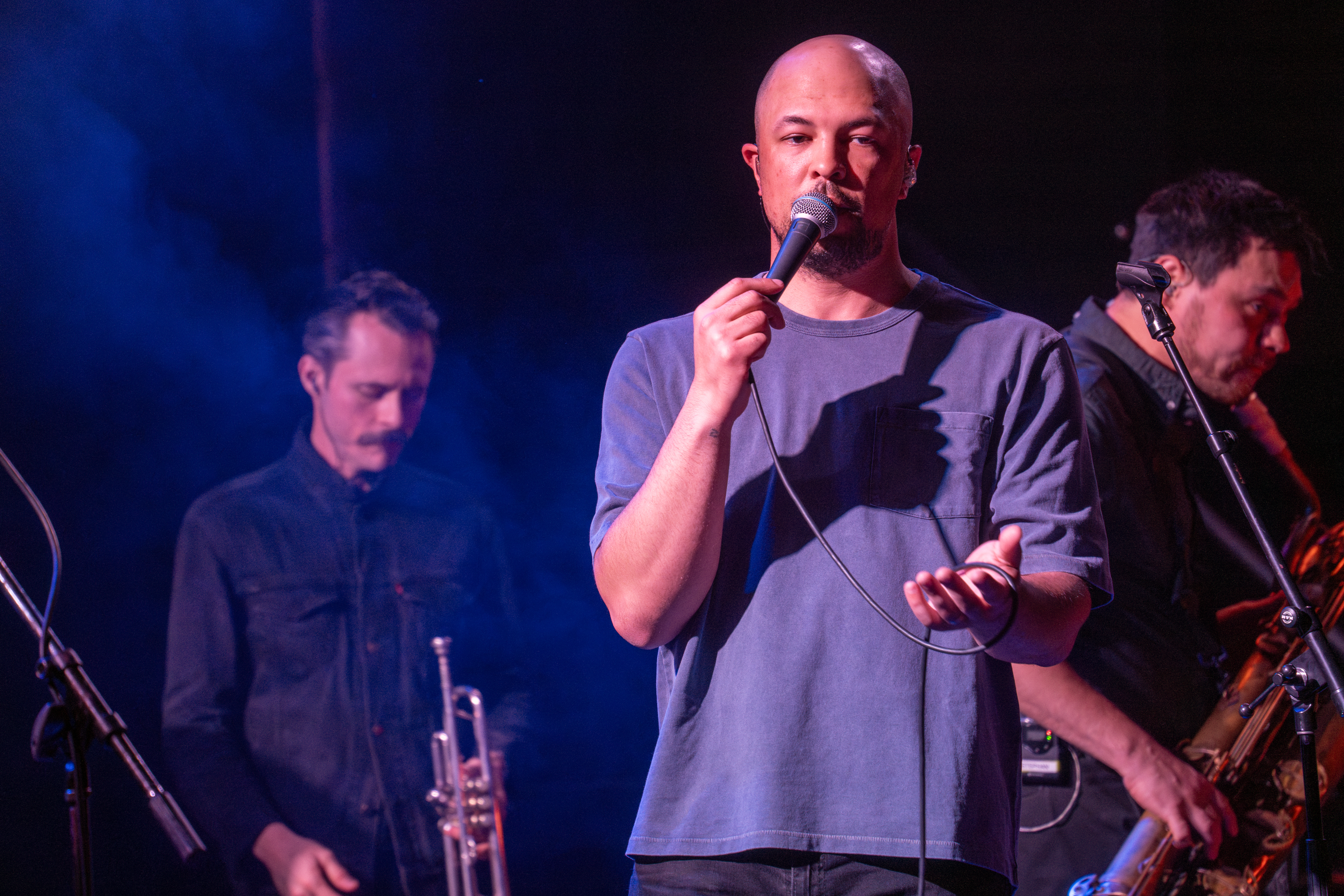
Allen Tate performing with San Fermin in 2025

=== Jackrabbit ===
Ludwig-Leone began writing his follow-up record in January and February 2013, prior to the release of the San Fermin debut record.

On December 7, 2014, the band teased their new single "Parasites" via Instagram. The next day, NPR premiered the track and announced the release of the band's second album. Jackrabbit was released on April 21, 2015, via Downtown Records and debuted at #8 on the Billboard Heatseekers Chart, and was met with critical praise from NPR and Rolling Stone. San Fermin made their national television debut on CBS This Morning on May 2, 2015, and made their late night debut on Last Call With Carson Daly on June 2, 2015.

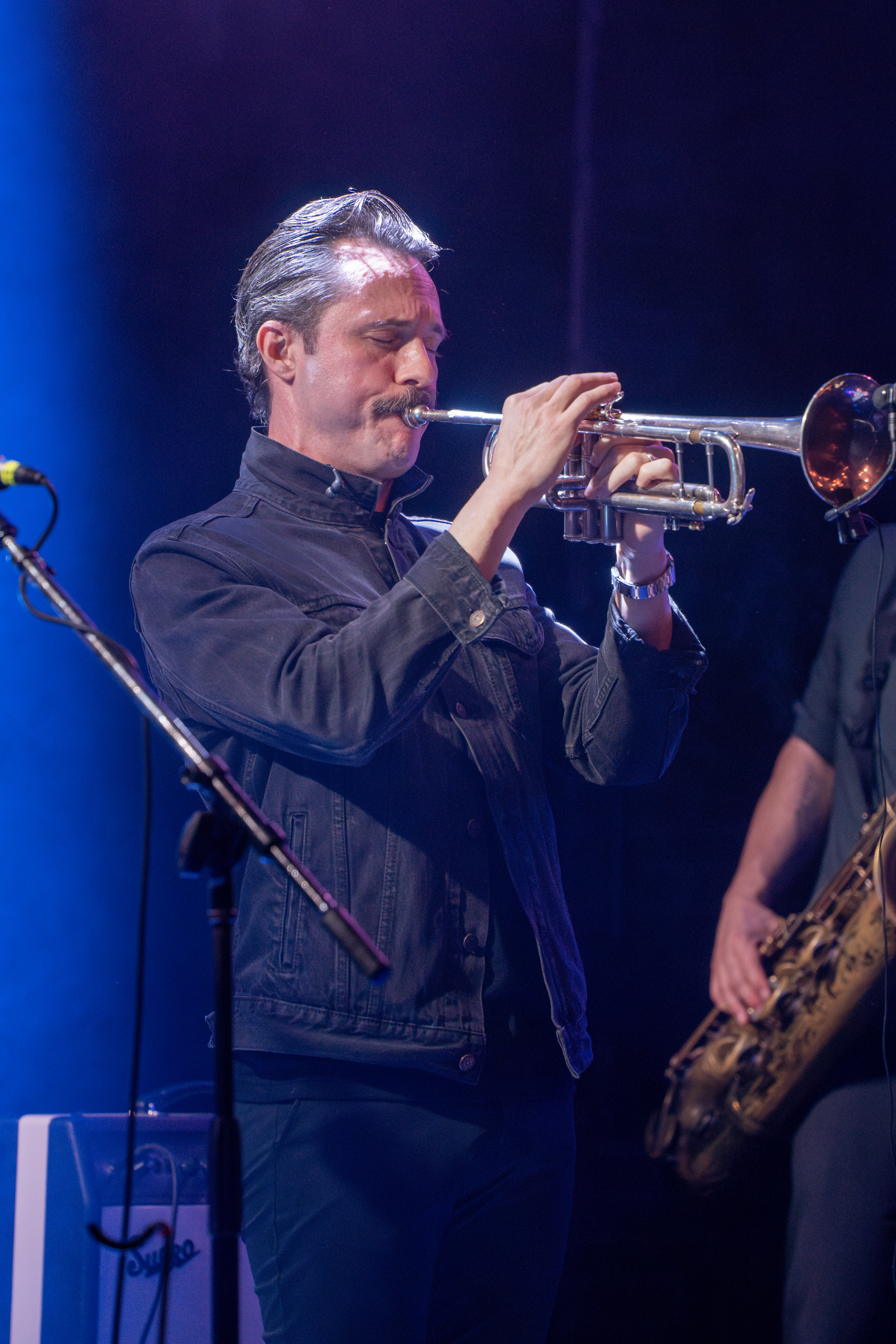
John Brandon performing with San Fermin in 2025

=== Belong and Live at the Fillmore ===
Throughout the fall of 2016, San Fermin posted pictures and short videos on their Instagram revealing that they were recording a third album, referred to as simply #LP3. On December 8, 2016, the band announced that they had finished recording and mixing LP3 and on January 5, 2017, uploaded a single called "Open" to their YouTube channel. The same day, NPR reported that their new album would be called Belong; a week later TIME debuted a second single, "Bride", and announced an album release date of April 7.

In January 2017, musician Claire Wellin joined the band, replacing Rebekah Durham as violinist and vocalist. As a band, San Fermin has performed original works by composer Mark Dancigers in collaboration with NOW Ensemble.

On April 12, 2019, it was announced via San Fermin's Instagram page that vocalist Charlene Kaye was leaving the band later that month to pursue other musical opportunities. Two weeks later, the band released their live album Live at the Fillmore, promoting the record with a special concert event which included the premiere of their "life on the road" documentary film No Promises. The record was released as a part of 2019's Record Store Day.

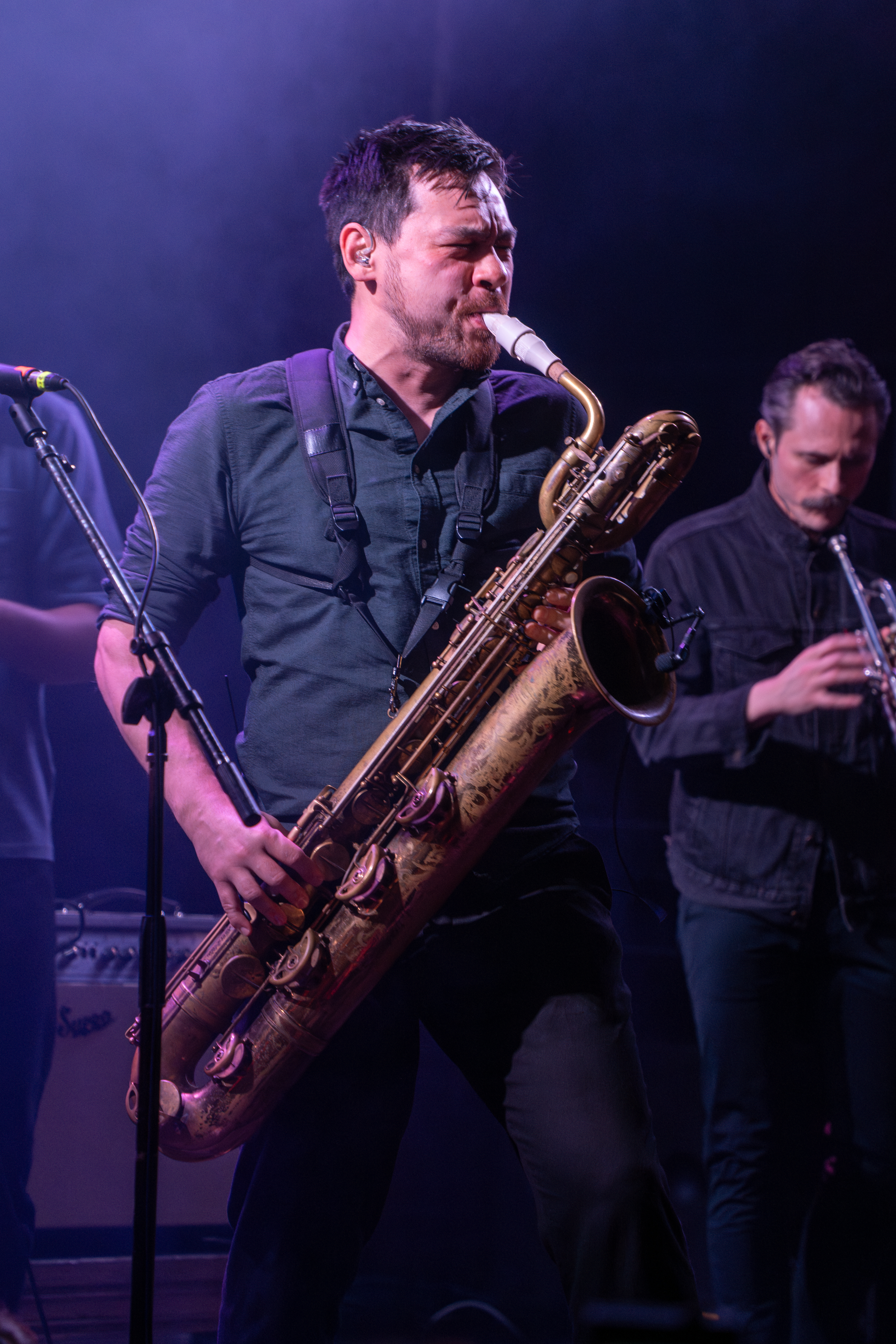
Stephen Chen performing with San Fermin in 2025

=== The Cormorant I & II ===
San Fermin's next studio project is The Cormorant. The Cormorant consists of two full-length releases which meditate on the themes of childhood, growing up, and the loss of innocence. This project, and its respective singles, are the first works of the group to be released through Ludwig-Leone's Sony Masterworks imprint Better Company.

On June 26, 2019, San Fermin released the single "The Hunger" featuring vocalist Samia and announced a North American tour for Fall 2019 to support a then untitled fourth LP. The band also indicated the addition of both new band member vocalist Karlie Bruce and guitarist and longtime touring member Aki Ishiguro to the band's official line-up.

On August 14, the band announced that their fourth studio album would be called The Cormorant I. Ludwig-Leone wrote most of the record in Iceland. Especially reminiscent of their first album, the record weaves a story between a male and female character. As on records before, vocalist Allen Tate takes on the male role, while a rotating cast of women including San Fermin's Claire Wellin and Karlie Bruce, as well as Samia and Sarah Pedinotti of Lip Talk, take on the female role. The record also features harpist Lavinia Meijer and the Attacca Quartet. With the announcement, the group also released the second of three singles, "The Living".

The group released the album, The Cormorant I, on October 4, 2019. Their third single, "Saints," and its accompanying music video were released the same day.

San Fermin released the first single for second half of The Cormorant double album, The Cormorant II, on February 27, 2020. Titled "Little Star," the single was accompanied by the announcement that the new record would be available to stream on March 27, 2020, as part of the sixteen-track The Cormorant I & II.

In December 2021, San Fermin released the collaborative EP In This House, which features Attacca Quartet, Nico Muhly, Lisel (Eliza Bagg, a former touring member), Sorcha Richardson, Thao, Wye Oak, Wild Pink, and The Districts.

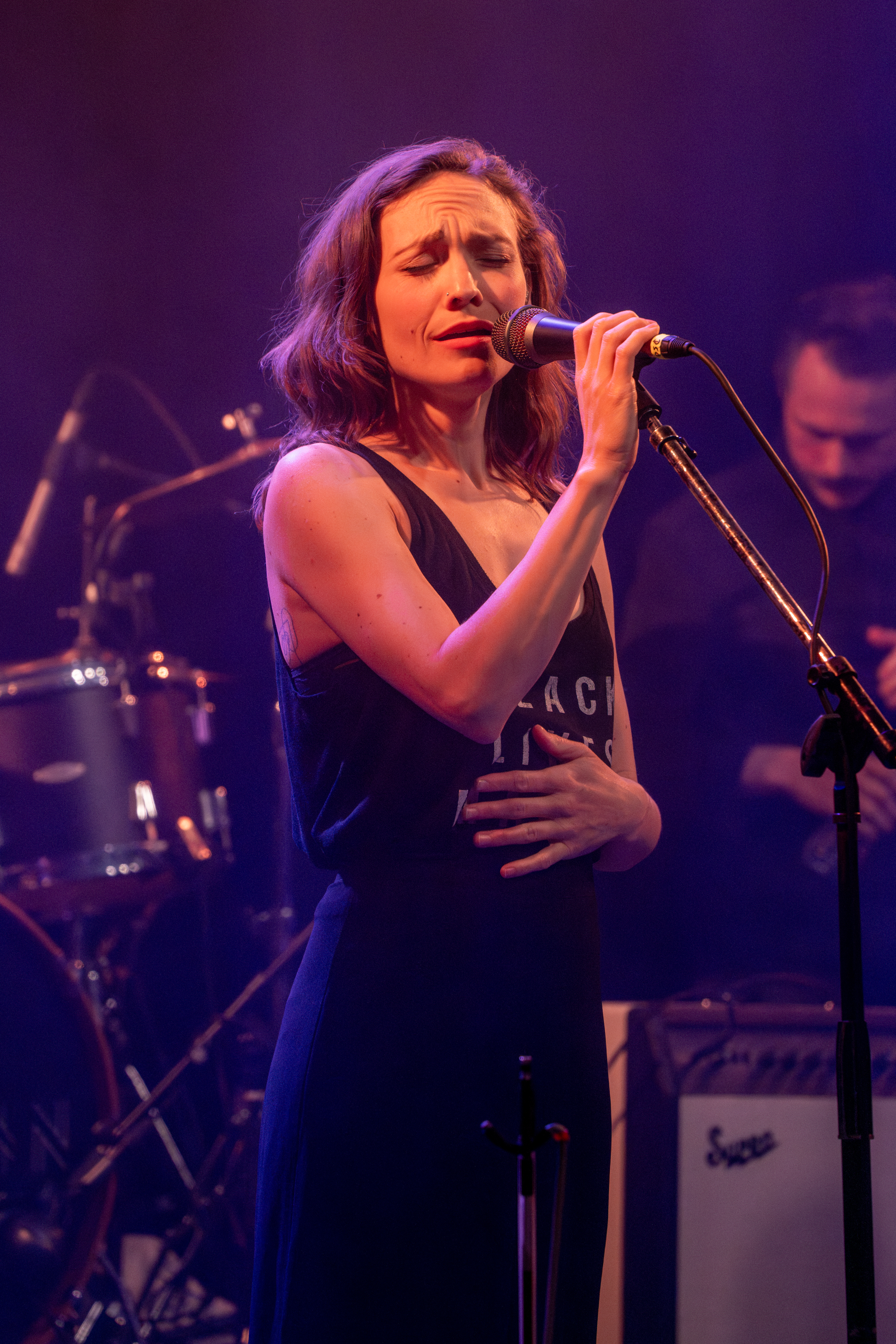
Claire Wellin performing with San Fermin in 2025

=== Your Ghost EP and Arms ===
In September 2022, San Fermin released an EP entitled Your Ghost, featuring the songs "Tired of Loving You", "Someone You Call Baby", and "Your Ghost". Less orchestral than the band's earlier efforts, Ludwig-Leone described the EP as "an experiment with a new kind of writing style". This experiment would be continued on the band's next studio album.

On September 14, 2023, San Fermin released a new single entitled "Arms" and on October 26 they announced that their fifth studio album, Arms, would be released on February 16, 2024, with a supporting tour to follow. They also revealed the album tracklist and debuted another single from the album, "Didn't Want You To". Additional singles "My Love is a Loneliness" and "Weird Environment" would follow in December and January.

Arms has a more intimate, direct sound than much of San Fermin's previous work, which Ludwig-Leone ascribed to a decision to begin with the lyrics and to write the music on the piano. The lyrics were inspired by a pair of break-ups in Ludwig-Leone's personal life, and he described the album as "the most autobiographical thing I’ve done."

A "Strings Version" of Arms featuring ADAM Quartet was released in October 2024.

The band announced a 10th anniversary tour of their album Jackrabbit via social media on November 19, 2024.

== Members ==
Current

- Ellis Ludwig-Leone – bandleader, composer, piano, keys, percussion (2011–present)
- Allen Tate – vocals, guitar (2011–present)
- Stephen Chen – saxophone (2012–present)
- John Brandon – trumpet (2012–present)
- Tyler McDiarmid – guitar, bass guitar, engineer (2012–present)
- Claire Wellin – violin, vocals (2017–present)
- Aki Ishiguro – guitar (2019–present; touring member: 2014–2019)

Former

- Michael Hanf – drums, percussion, glockenspiel, vibraphone (2012–2022)
- Eliza Bagg – violin, vocals (touring member: 2013)
- Rae Cassidy – vocals (touring member: 2013–2014)
- Rebekah Durham – violin, vocals, mandolin (2013–2017)
- Charlene Kaye – vocals, guitar (2014–2019)
- Karlie Bruce – vocals (2019–2020)

=== Timeline ===
Other Contributors

As the record San Fermin was recorded prior to establishing the band, nineteen musicians are credited as making up the ensemble, only four of whom would remain with the group. The remaining musicians included singers Holly Laessig and Jess Wolfe of Lucius, cellist Clarice Jensen, violinists Rob Moose and Caroline Shaw, and violist Nadia Sirota, among others. Other musicians who performed with San Fermin in their early shows include percussionist Molly Yeh, now host of the Food Network show Girl Meets Farm, and Icelandic composer Halldór Smárason.

On their records, San Fermin has utilized the talents of prominent contemporary classical musicians. These include, but are not limited to members of the ensemble yMusic, Roomful of Teeth contributors Estelí Gomez, Caroline Shaw, and Eliza Bagg, classical flutist Isabel Gleicher, trombonist Alan Ferber, and harpist Lavinia Meijer.

== Discography ==
=== Studio albums ===
List of studio albums with selected chart positions
Title	Album details	Peak chart positions	
Title	Album details	US Heat.	US Indie
San Fermin	Released: September 17, 2013; Label: Downtown Records; Format: CD, LP, download	18	—
Jackrabbit	Released: April 21, 2015; Label: Downtown Records; Format: CD, LP, download	8	49
Belong	Released: April 7, 2017; Label: Downtown Records/ Interscope Records; Format: CD, LP, download	21	—
The Cormorant I & II	Released: March 27, 2020; Part I released October 4, 2019; Label: Better Company/ Sony Music; Format: LP, CD (I & II only), download	—	—
Arms	Released: February 16, 2024; Label: Better Company; Format:	—	—
"—" denotes releases that did not chart or were not released in that territory.

=== EPs ===
Title	Album details
In This House	Compilation album; Released: December 10, 2021; Label: Better Company; Format: LP, digital
Your Ghost	Released: July 21, 2022; Label: Better Company; Format: Digital

Live albums

- Live From the Advent Lutheran Church NYC (2013) – Downtown Records
- Live At The Fillmore (2019) – Votiv/ San Fermin LLC

Other albums

- Sonsick Remixes EP (2013) – Downtown Records
- San Fermin (Commentary) (2013) – Downtown Records
- Arms (Strings Version) (2024) - Better Company Records

=== Singles ===
Title	Year	Album	Label(s)
"Sonsick"	2012	San Fermin	self-released
"Sonsick"	2013	San Fermin	Downtown Records
"Jackrabbit"	2015	Jackrabbit	Downtown Records
"No Devil"	2015	Non-album singles	Downtown Records
"Shiver" (with Sam Amidon)	2016	Non-album singles	Downtown Records; Universal Music Group
"Open"	2017	Belong	Downtown Records; Interscope Records
"No Promises"	2017	Belong	Downtown Records; Interscope Records
"Bride"	2017	Belong	Downtown Records; Interscope Records
"Belong"	2017	Belong	Downtown Records; Interscope Records
"Asleep on the Train"	2017	Non-album single	Downtown Records; Interscope Records
"The Hunger"	2019	The Cormorant I	Better Company; Sony Masterworks
"The Living"	2019	The Cormorant I	Better Company; Sony Masterworks
"The Hunger (Acoustic Version)"	2019	Non-album singles	Better Company; Sony Masterworks
"Run Away With Me" (Carly Rae Jepsen cover)	2019	Non-album singles	Better Company; Sony Masterworks
"Saints (Acoustic Version)"	2019	Non-album singles	Better Company; Sony Masterworks
"Little Star"	2020	The Cormorant II	Better Company; Sony Masterworks
"In This House" (with Nico Muhly & Attacca Quartet)	2020	In This House EP	Better Company
"Basement Days" (with Sorcha Ricrdson & Lisel)	2021	In This House EP	Better Company
"Dream Yourself Awake" (with Thao)	2021	In This House EP	Better Company
"Little Star (Acoustic Version)"	2022	Non-album single	Better Company
"Your Ghost"	2022	Your Ghost EP	Better Company
"Someone Call You Baby"	2022	Your Ghost EP	Better Company
"Tired of Loving You"	2022	Your Ghost EP	Better Company
"Arms"	2023	Arms	Better Company
"Didn't Want You To"	2023	Arms	Better Company
"My Love is a Loneliness"	2023	Arms	Better Company
"Weird Environment"	2024	Arms	Better Company
"Don't Speak" (No Doubt cover)	2024	Non-album singles	Better Company
"As It Was" (Harry Styles cover)	2024	Non-album singles	Better Company

=== Documentary films ===
- No Promises (2019)
