= Ulvang =

Ulvang is a surname. Notable people with the surname include:

- Stelth Ulvang, American musician
- Vegard Ulvang (born 1963), Norwegian cross-country skier
