= The Cormorant I & II =

Studio album by San Fermin
- Released: Part I: October 4, 2019; Part I & II: March 27, 2020
- Recorded: October 2018–January 2019
- Studios: Reservoir Studios, Flux Studios, Ellis' apartment
- Length: 49:03
- Labels: Better Company, Sony Music
- Producer: Ellis Ludwig-Leone

San Fermin chronology
Belong (2017)	The Cormorant I & II (2019)	Arms (2024)

The Cormorant I & II, also referred to as The Cormorant, is the fourth studio album released by American band San Fermin. The album was released in two parts, functioning as a thematic double album. The first half, The Cormorant I, was released in late 2019 and the second half was released in combination with I as The Cormorant I & II in March 2020. These were the first records to be released under the band's new imprint Better Company, in partnership with Sony Music.

This album was the first release with the group's new vocalist Karlie Bruce and saw an expanded singing role for Claire Wellin. Other contributors of note include singers Sarah Pedinotti, Samia, and longtime collaborator Eliza Bagg (Lisel), as well as harpist Lavinia Meijer and Attacca Quartet, among others.

== Production ==
Like all previous San Fermin releases, the records was written and produced by bandleader Ellis Ludwig-Leone. He wrote the record in the northwestern Icelandic town of Ísafjörður in 2018; Icelandic musician Halldór Smárason, and friend of Ludwig-Leone who played in early San Fermin shows, lives here.

Ludwig-Leone returned to Brooklyn later that year and began working with his San Fermin bandmates, namely Allen Tate, Claire Wellin, John Brandon, Stephen Chen, Michael Hanf, Tyler McDiarmid and Aki Ishiguro, to shape and record the record. During that time, they recruited a new vocalist, New York-based Australian singer-songwriter Karlie Bruce, and recorded with Sarah Pedinotti (of Lip Talk), and Samia Finnerty (of Samia).

== Track listing ==
All songs written, arranged, and produced by Ellis Ludwig-Leone.

The Cormorant I
No.	Title	Length
1.	"The Cormorant"	02:28
2.	"Cerulean Gardens"	04:37
3.	"Hickman Creek"	00:51
4.	"The Hunger"	03:45
5.	"Summer by the Void"	02:57
6.	"Saints"	03:18
7.	"The Living"	04:03
8.	"The Myth"	03:17

The Cormorant II
No.	Title	Length
9.	"Swamp Song"	03:03
10.	"Westfjords"	03:47
11.	"Do Less"	01:07
12.	"Little Star"	02:56
13.	"Berkley Bridge"	03:03
14.	"Freedom (Yeah Yeah!)"	03:52
15.	"Waterworld"	04:35
16.	"Tunnel Mt."	01:24
Total length:		49:03

== Personnel ==
Adapted from liner notes.

Musicians

- Allen Tate – vocals
- Claire Wellin – vocals, background vocals; violin (10)
- Karlie Bruce – vocals
- Sarah Pedinotti – vocals
- Samia – vocals (4)
- Eliza Bagg – background vocals
- Molly Netter – background vocals
- John Brandon – trumpet
- Stephen Chen – baritone sax, soprano sax
- Tyler McDiarmid – guitar
- Aki Ishiguro – guitar
- Ellis Ludwig-Leone – piano, keyboards, additional percussion
- Michael Hanf – drums, vibraphone, glockenspiel, additional percussion
- Isabel Gleicher – flute
- Sam Sadigursky – clarinet
- Alan Ferber – trombone
- Dave Nelson – trombone
- Lavinia Meijer – harp
- Attacca Quartet
  - Amy Schroeder – violin
  - Keiko Tokunaga – violin
  - Nathan Schram – viola
  - Andrew Yee – cello

Technical

- Tyler McDiarmid – engineer, additional mix preparation
- Mark Bengston – additional engineering
- Pat Dillet – mixing (2–3, 5, 8–13, 15–16)
- Peter Katis – mixing (1, 4, 6–7, 14)
- Carson Graham – score preparation
- Greg Calbri – mastering

Art and management

- Stephen Halker – album art, art direction, art layout
- Ellis Ludwig-Leone – art direction
- Gaby Alvarez – management, art layout
- Thomas Winkler – management
