= Allen Tate (musician) =

American singer-songwriter (born 1989)

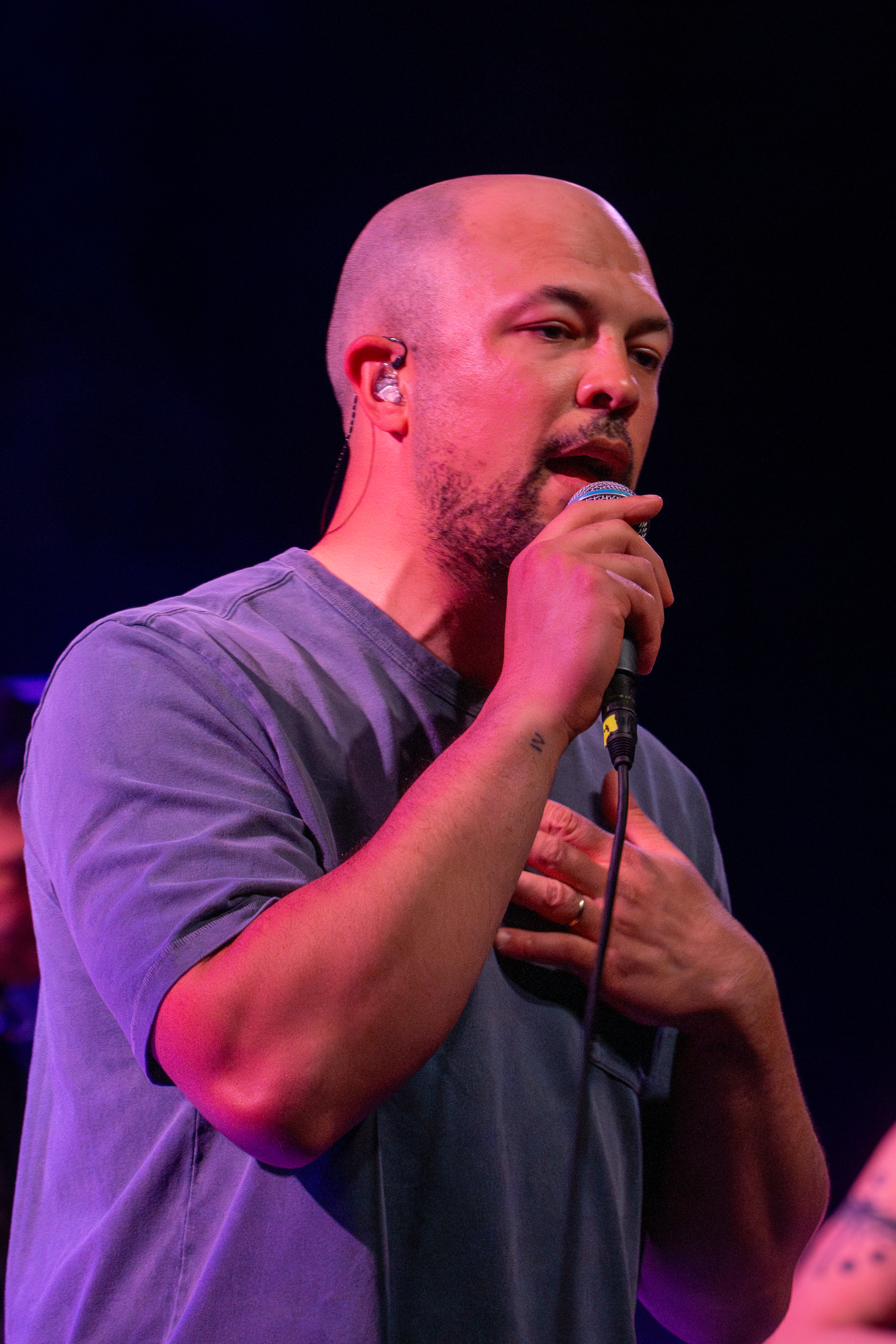
- Tate with San Fermin in 2025

Background information
- Born: June 9, 1989 (age 37); Philadelphia, Pennsylvania
- Origin: New York City
- Genre: Indie rock
- Occupations: Singer-songwriter, musician, producer
- Instruments: Vocals, guitar
- Years active: 2011–present
- Labels: Votiv Music, Sleep Well Records, Better Company Records
- Member of: San Fermin
- Spouse: Cory Stieg (m. 2021)
- Website: allentatemusic.com

Allen Tate (born June 9, 1989) is an American vocalist, record producer, and songwriter based in Brooklyn, New York. Since 2012, he has been a singer of San Fermin, the indie-rock band led by composer Ellis Ludwig-Leone. As a producer, he has collaborated with artists including San Fermin, Wild Pink, The Districts, Daisy the Great, and Hypoluxo among others. In 2020, he and Ludwig-Leone co-founded their label Better Company Records, a joint venture with The Orchard. Tate's debut solo project, Sleepwalker, co-produced by Ludwig-Leone, was released on October 28, 2016. His sophomore record In the Waves, co-produced by John Agnello, was released on May 3, 2019.

== Biography ==
=== Early life ===
Tate attended school at the Germantown Academy, a non-sectarian college prep school located in Fort Washington, Pennsylvania. Tate attended New York University where he studied philosophy, and planned to pursue a law career.

=== San Fermin ===
At age 15, Tate attended the Berklee College of Music summer program during high school, where he would meet collaborator Ellis Ludwig-Leone.

Tate and Ludwig-Leone came together to create San Fermin's self-titled debut album, with Tate serving as the lead vocalist. San Fermin arrived on September 17, 2013, with many reviews complimenting Tate's baritone-voice. Tate has since contributed to the band's follow-up projects including Jackrabbit (2014), Belong (2017), Live at the Fillmore (2019) and The Cormorant I & II (2020).

=== Solo career ===
In the fall of 2014, during a 3-week stay in Copenhagen, Tate began working on his first solo project. With Sleepwalker, the aforementioned project, Tate attempted to convey feelings of loneliness and anxiety, describing his goal as a "menacing bath: warm and enveloping, but with an element of anxiety."

For the recording of the project, Tate recruited Ludwig-Leone and other San Fermin bandmates Michael Hanf (drums) and Tyler McDiarmid (guitar) in order to work during breaks in the San Fermin tour schedule. The album was then mixed by Matty Green (TV on the Radio, Yeasayer, Wild Belle) and released on October 28, 2016. Bob Boilen of NPR Music called Tate's voice, "deep and dreamy" and commended the musical textures that Tate created on the album.

Tate released his second album In the Waves on May 3, 2019 with independent label Sleep Well Records. He released the single "When Did I Get Like This" in September 2018 to promote the new record.

== Discography ==
=== Solo work ===
Albums

- Sleepwalker (2016)
- In the Waves (2019)

Album singles

- "Being Alone" (2016)
- "Don't Choke" (2016)
- "Wrapped Up" (2016)
- "YDNF (Young Dumb Numb Fun)"
- "When Did I Get Like This" (2018)
- "Your Love Is Not Enough" (2019)
- "Something Different" (2019)

Non-album singles

- "Polly" (2017)

=== With San Fermin ===
Albums

- San Fermin (2013)
- Jackrabbit (2014)
- Belong (2017)
- Live At The Fillmore (2019)
- The Cormorant I & II (2019)
