= Garrett Byrnes =

American composer

Garrett Byrnes (born December 30, 1971) is an American composer.

Byrnes was born in Bad Kreuznach, Germany while his father was stationed at the U.S. Army Base there, and relocated to New Jersey in the United States. He studied music composition, receiving his bachelor's degree from the Boston Conservatory, his master's degree from the Peabody Institute of the Johns Hopkins University, and his doctorate from the Indiana University Jacobs School of Music.

Since embarking on his professional career, Byrnes has worked with numerous performers both in the United States and abroad. His music has been read and performed by ensembles including the Minnesota Orchestra, Orchestre National des Pays de la Loire, Indianapolis Symphony Orchestra, Contra Costa Chamber Orchestra, Chesapeake Youth Repertory Orchestra, Peabody Symphony and Concert orchestras, Indiana University New Music Ensemble, Cleveland Chamber Collective, Tarab Cello Ensemble, and Tonus Percussion Group. Byrnes' orchestral music in particular is currently gaining wider recognition. In 2004 the Indiana University New Music Ensemble premiered his Concerto for Piano and Chamber Orchestra. Later that same year his work "Red Moon" was premiered in California after receiving the Northridge Prize for orchestral composition. On December 1, 2006, conductor Osmo Vänskä lead the Minnesota Orchestra in the world premiere of "Solace". In 2008, renowned French Cellist Xavier Phillips premiered "La Chapelle d'Aiguilhe: Concerto for Cello & Orchestra" with the Orchestre National des Pays de la Loire under conductor Sascha Goetzel.

Byrnes has taught composition at Illinois Wesleyan University as adjunct assistant professor of composition, at Indiana University as associate instructor of composition, and at Ball State University as assistant professor of composition and theory. He has studied composition with Sven-David Sandström, Chen Yi, Don Freund, David Dzubay, and Larry Bell. In addition to awards from the American Music Center, National Association of Composers, ASCAP, USA International Harp Composition Competition, California State University, Northridge, Indiana University, Boston Conservatory and others, Byrnes has received fellowships from the artist retreat organizations Yaddo and the Virginia Center for the Creative Arts.

Byrnes' harp works have been recorded on the Channel Classics and Kalan Müzik recording labels. His viola works have been recorded on the Arabesque Records label.

== Major works ==
- Capriccio Improvviso (15', 2013)

Viola & Piano

Commissioned by and dedicated to Maggie Snyder through the generosity of the University of Georgia's Willson Center Grant for the Humanities

- Leeds Devil Nocturne (12', 2012)

Flute (optional piccolo) & Piano

Commissioned by the Cleveland Chamber Collective and written for Mary Kay Fink and Nicholas Underhill

- Valley of Butterflies (15', 2011)

Harp solo, 5 movements

- Capriccio Tempestoso (10', 2010)

Orchestra: 2-1-2-1; 2-2-2-1; timp, perc (1); solo harp; strings

- Devil in Moscow (15', 2009)

A Fantastical Character Suite for Viola & Harpsichord

Commissioned by Maggie Snyder and Alexandra Snyder Dunbar through the generosity of the West Virginia University Foundation

- La Chapelle d'Aiguilhe: Concerto for Cello & Orchestra (18', 2008)

Orchestra: 2-2-2-2; 2-2-0-0; timp.; solo cello; strings

Commissioned for Xavier Phillips and the Orchestre National des Pays de la Loire

- Mosaics (for wind quintet, 8', 2008)

Commissioned by the Alpha Lambda chapter of Phi Mu Alpha Sinfonia fraternity of Illinois Wesleyan University

- Villanelle (for violin and harp, 15', 2006)

Commissioned for Lavinia Meijer and Tjeerd Top.

- Solace (17’, 2005)

Orchestra: 3-3-3-3; 4-3-3-1; timp., 3 perc., pno./cel., harp, strings

- Concerto for Piano & Chamber Orchestra (15’, 2003)

Piano Solo & Chamber Orchestra: 1111; 1111; 2 perc, hp, 2111 Commissioned by the Indiana University New Music Ensemble

- Persist (13’, 2003)

For eight cellos Commissioned by Florent Renard-Payen and the Tarab Cello Ensemble

- Triptyclysm (16’, 2002)

For percussion trio Commissioned by Tonus Percussion Group

- Songs of the Sea (15’, 2001)

Tenor & Piano, 5 movements

- Visions in Twilight (8’, 2000)

Harp solo Written for Fatma Ceren Necipoğlu Available from Lyon & Healy West

- The Flames of Imbolc (12', 1999)

Orchestra: 3-3-3-3; 4-3-3-1; timp., 3 perc.; strings
