= Railbird (band) =

- Origin: Brooklyn, NY
- Genres: Experimental / Psychedelic / Pop
- Members: Sarah Pedinotti Chris Kyle; Chris Carey; James Gascoyne; Ben Davis Jeremy Gustin
- Website: www.railbirdband.com

Railbird is an American Experimental/Psychedelic Pop band from Brooklyn, New York.

== Career ==
Railbird, is the musical project of songwriter Sarah K. Pedinotti. They were featured as one of "5 Artists You Should Know About" in Relix Magazine's December 2010 - The Family Issue.

After self-releasing their debut album, No One, in March 2011, the band toured to and from South by Southwest. The album, recorded in Queens and upstate New York, took a year and a half to complete and was co-produced by Jeremy Gustin and Sarah Pedinotti. A month prior to the album's release, their song "Ashes In" off No One was featured on TVD's The Idelic Hour with Jon Sidel, as a "Hit of the Week."

In June 2011, Railbird performed on the main stage at the 4th Annual Roots Picnic with The Roots, Ariel Pink, Edward Sharpe and the Magnetic Zeroes, Little Dragon, Nas, and Esperanza Spalding.

Railbird was voted "Best Band" in July 2009, 2010, and 2011 and "Best Indie Rock Band" in 2010 by Metroland.

== Band members ==
- Sarah Pedinotti
- Chris Kyle
- Chris Carey
- James Gascoyne
- Ben Davis
- Jeremy Gustin

== Discography ==
- No One (March 2011)
