= The Nutcracker at Wethersfield =

The Nutcracker at Wethersfield is a 2025 documentary film which follows choreographer Troy Schumacher and dancers of the New York City Ballet as they perform the Nutcracker at the Wethersfield Estate in 2020 after pandemic lockdowns canceled the traditional holiday performances. It was directed by Anne Sundberg and executive produced by Amanda Seyfried.
