= Bluebird Memories =

Audio-only musical narrative by Common

Bluebird Memories: A Journey Through Lyrics and Life is an upcoming Audible Original production by Common, which was scheduled to be released in 2020. The "audio-only musical narrative" will have Common "[explore] the various writers and musicians who have inspired him". Written and directed by Awoye Timpo, scenic design by Jason Ardizzone-West, lighting design by Alan C. Edwards, associate set design by Anna Driftmier.
