= Carlos Micháns =

Dutch composer

Carlos Eduardo Micháns
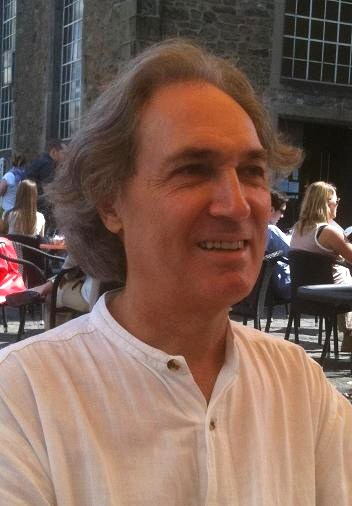
- Carlos Micháns in Wuppertal, 2009
- Born: August 18, 1950 (age 75)

Carlos Eduardo Micháns (born 18 August 1950) is a Dutch composer, writer and draughtsman of Argentine origin. He has lived in the Netherlands since 1982.

His works (from solo pieces to large compositions for choir and orchestra) are published in The Hague by Donemus. Micháns is also a writer. He has published poetry, short stories, novels and a series of essays on Argentine history. From 1995 to 2012 he was in charge of Podium Neerlandés, a program of Radio Nederland (the Dutch international broadcast) for Latin American audiences featuring recordings made in concert halls in the Netherlands.

== Biography ==
=== Early life and training ===
Michans was born in Buenos Aires into a middle-class family with Spanish, French, Swedish, English, Scottish and North American ancestry, including the Argentine-born, anglo-American composer Mildred Couper (1887-1974), a pioneer of microtonal music in the US. Micháns started taking piano and theory lessons at seven, but gave up after a few years. Aged 12, he returned to piano, and while still a teenager, he was encouraged by his piano teacher Almah Melgar to play his own compositions at the yearly students concerts held at a piano shop in downtown Buenos Aires, which led him into composing more seriously. His first lessons in composition at 17 with Roberto García Morillo were not fruitful, which Micháns attributed to his teacher; at the same time he studied harmony, counterpoint and fugue with Susana Oliveto, who became his musical mentor and a lifelong friend. In 1967 he was granted a two-year scholarship by Almah Melgar which enabled him to study organ with her husband Carlos Larrimbe, a choir conductor and organist at St. Saviour’s Church in Buenos Aires. After Larrimbe died less than a year later, Michans continued his studies of choir and orchestra conducting at the University of Buenos Aires and the Art Institute of Argentina's opera house, Teatro Colón, which he completed almost simultaneously in 1973.

=== Early career in Argentina ===
The political unrest in Argentina in the early 1970s and the return to power of the Peronist regime brought about a reorganization of the theater and the reincorporation of staff previously dismissed by the former board of directors. It also caused the resignation of Pedro Valenti Costa, the head of the Art Institute responsible for Micháns's eventual appointment as an assistant conductor. During the following years of uncertainty, Michans took up drawing and sculpting, including a couple of public exhibitions, and also enrolled briefly in the Faculty of Veterinary, which he quit after a few months. In 1976, Micháns managed to secure a monthly salary as a music teacher, later also working as a private English teacher. Although he composed and played less during this time, in 1981 his Three Pieces for Chamber Orchestra was performed by the National Symphonic Orchestra.

=== Relocation to Europe ===
After a short visit to the Netherlands in 1981, Micháns applied for a scholarship from the Dutch government which would allow him purely focus on composition. Although the scholarship came through, his plans were delayed by the outbreak of the Falkland War. He obtained his permit after Argentina's defeat and left for the Netherlands in August 1982. At the Utrecht Conservatorium, he took lessons from Hans Kox, Joep Straesser, Ton Bruynèl (electronic music) and Tristan Keuris. After obtaining his diploma in 1987, he became a Dutch citizen. He has resided in Utrecht ever since.

From 1995 to 2012 Micháns was a free-lance writer and editor for Podium Neerlandés, a classical music program of the Dutch international broadcasting station Radio Nederland for Spanish speaking, mainly Latin American audiences.

Since 2011, Micháns divides his time between the Netherlands and France, where he organises concerts and participates in other cultural activities, mainly in the northeastern region of Champagne-Ardenne. In 2019, he co-founded the Centre Culturel Arteméum in Langres (Haute-Marne), which holds exhibitions of his art collections, which cover various fields (paintings, drawings, textiles) and cultures.

== Musical works ==
Michans's catalog includes works for various instrumental combinations, from solos to major compositions for choir and orchestra. His list of chamber and choral music features a number of titles regularly performed by Dutch and international musicians and ensembles. Several of his compositions, which are published in The Netherlands by Donemus, have been released on CD. His music has been performed by musicians and ensembles including: Isabelle van Keulen (vl.), Ronald Brautigam (pn.), Severin von Eckardstein (pn.), Michael Collins (cl.), Liza Ferschtman (vl.), Tjeerd Top (vl.) Dmitry Ferschtman (vc.), Eeva Koskinen (vl.), Remy van Kesteren (harp), Arno Bornkamp (sax.), Pieter Wispelwey (vc.), Marcio Carneiro (vc.), Lavinia Meijer (hp.), Udo Reinemann (baritone), Joost Willemze (harpist, The Netherlands), Thierry Fischer (cond.), Kenneth Montgomery (cond.), Etienne Siebens (cond.), Utrecht String Quartet, Aurelia Saxophone Quartet, Koh-I-Noor Saxophone Quartet, Sirius Saxophone Quartet, Duo Imaginaire (clarinet & harp), Het Reizend Muziekgezelschap (Amsterdam Chamber Music Society), ROctet (The Netherlands) Trío Abril (The Netherlands), Rietveld Ensemble (The Netherlands), Trio Insomnio (saxophones, USA), Sarastro String Quartet (Switzerland), Aristos String Quartet (The Netherlands), Rietveld Ensemble (The Netherlands), Orquesta Sinfónica Nacional (Buenos Aires, Argentina), Rotterdam Philharmonic Orchestra, Orkest van het Oosten, Radio Kamer Filharmonie, Groot Omroepkoor (the major choir of the Dutch Broadcasting Company), NSK (Dutch Students Choir), Utrecht University Choir, Holland Symfonia and Hagen Philharmonisches Orchester (Germany).

== Literary work ==
Micháns began writing short stories and poetry in the 1970s. After his first visits to India in the early 1990s, he published limited editions of his travel stories (The Eyes of Meenakshi), legends (The Merchant of Poompuhar) and a novel (Madurai, Madurai) based on Indian traditions and religion, in order to raise money for humanitarian projects in South India in which Micháns was involved. He later wrote on other subjects, including autobiographical stories (Rogelio G.) and an essay on aspects of Argentina's history up to 1982 (It Rains Red in Buenos Aires). Among his recent works are a new series of Indian stories, animal stories, an introduction to aspects of Mongolian religious art, several poetry albums and essays on art of Africa, Ukraine and the work of American artist Saul Lishinsky (1922-2012).
