= San Fermin (album) =

Studio album by San Fermin
- Released: July 27, 2013
- Recorded: November 2011–July 2012
- Studio: East Side Sound, Dubway Studios, Sounds Like A Fire, The Banff Centre
- Length: 55:15
- Label: Downtown Records
- Producer: Ellis Ludwig-Leone

San Fermin chronology
San Fermin (2013)	Jackrabbit (2015)

San Fermin is the debut album by chamber pop collective San Fermin. It was developed, written, and produced by composer Ellis Ludwig-Leone and performed by a loose collection of New York-based musicians who performed Ludwig-Leone's composition under the name San Fermin. An official band came about after the recording of the record. San Fermin received critical acclaim from outlets including NPR and Pitchfork.

== Development ==
After graduating from Yale in 2011, Ludwig-Leone retreated to Canada's secluded Banff Centre, where he wrote what would eventually become San Fermin. He wrote most of the record between October and December 2011. He returned to New York and began recording the album, completing the recording sessions during July 2012.

Nineteen people made up San Fermin in the recording process, in addition to other musical contributors. These included Ellis Ludwig-Leone, singer Allen Tate, saxophonist Stephen Chen, and trumpeter John Brandon who would form the core San Fermin the next decade. Additionally, acclaimed contemporary classical musicians Caroline Shaw, Rob Moose, and Nadia Sirota took part in the recording process.

== Release and reception ==
Initially, Ludwig-Leone intended San Fermin to be a one-off composition project. However, after debuting the record live in December, Ludwig-Leone received a record deal offer from Downtown Records that made him reconsider the scope of the San Fermin project.

San Fermin released their lead single "Sonsick" on December 4, 2012, premiering it on the music blog Beats Per Minute. Pitchfork gave the single a positive review, declaring the song "deliriously infectious." The full record was intended to be self-released in February 2013, but, after signing to Downtown Records, the release was pushed back first to June then to the September of that year.

San Fermin released the album on September 17, 2013, to positive reviews. NPR called the record "one of the year's most surprising, ambitious, evocative and moving records," praising Ludwig-Leone for his ability to write a collection of songs "as easy to love as they are to admire." Pitchfork also gave the album a positive review. The album reached No. 18 on the Billboard Top Heatseekers album chart.

In 2013, the band also released a track-by-track album of commentary album featuring Ludwig-Leone.

== Track listing ==
All tracks produced and written by Ellis Ludwig-Leone.

San Fermin
No.	Title	Length
1.	"Renaissance!"	4:01
2.	"Crueler Kind"	4:00
3.	"Lament For V.G."	1:38
4.	"Casanova"	3:51
5.	"Sonsick"	4:13
6.	"Methuselah"	4:53
7.	"At Sea"	1:15
8.	"Torero"	3:42
9.	"At Night, True Love"	2:11
10.	"The Count"	3:53
11.	"Bar"	4:30
12.	"In Waiting"	3:15
13.	"True Love, Asleep"	2:13
14.	"Oh Darling"	2:48
15.	"In The Morning"	0:25
16.	"Daedalus (What We Have)"	5:44
17.	"Altogether Changed"	2:43
Total length:		55:15

== Personnel ==
Adapted from liner notes.

San Fermin

- Allen Tate – vocals
- Lucius (Jess Wolfe & Holly Laessig) – vocals, background vocals
- Helen McCreary – background vocals
- Gabriella Tortorello – background vocals
- Emily Misch – background vocals
- Stephen Chen – saxophone
- John Brandon – trumpet
- Jennifer Griggs – trombone
- Brian Reese – trombone
- Matthew Fried – tuba
- Rob Moose – violin
- Caroline Shaw – violin
- Nadia Sirota – viola
- Clarice Jensen – cello
- Helen Kashap – harmonium
- Ellis Ludwig-Leone – piano, keyboards
- Nathan Prillaman – guitar
- Nick Jenkins – drums

Additional musicians

- Nathan Petitpas – glockenspiel, vibraphone, bass drum
- Laura Bowler – additional vocals (10)
- Alex Goodman – additional acoustic guitar (6)
- Dan Molad – additional percussion (1)

Technical and production

- Ellis Ludwig-Leone – producer, engineer, design concept
- Dan Molad – additional production, engineer
- Eric Elterman – engineer
- Chris Camilieri – engineer
- Joe Fingerote – engineer
- Jeff Lipton – mastering engineer
- Maria Rice – assistant mastering engineer
- Stephen Halker – design concept, album art
- Thomas Winkler – management
