= Sarah Pedinotti =

American singer-songwriter

- Born: Hartford, Connecticut, United States
- Occupation(s): musician, music producer, composer, songwriter, multi-media artist
- Instrument(s): Vocals, piano, drums, bass, keys

Sarah K Pedinotti known professionally as LIP TALK is an American experimental pop producer, multi-instrumentalist, improviser, composer and songwriter based in Brooklyn, NY. She is a collaborator and player in numerous bands, including Kalbells, Hayley Williams, The Secret Machines, Okkervil River, Cuddle Magic, and Railbird.

Pedinotti is one of seven in a family of artists. She began writing, singing and playing piano at an early age influenced by an eclectic assortment of music. Her father, David Pedinotti, is also a musician who plays guitar, blues harmonica, and banjo.

In the summer of 1996, her parents started a restaurant in Saratoga Springs called One Caroline Street Bistro. Sarah began singing there when she was twelve, sitting in with the nightly featured artists. Over the years she has performed with many artists including members of The Wynton Marsalis Lincoln Center Jazz Orchestra; Marcus Printup, Eric Lewis and Ali Jackson. She was taken under the wing of Lee Shaw (a student of Oscar Peterson), who taught her musical theory and history from a first hand perspective.

== Credits and Collaborations ==
Full list of additional credits/collaborations showing year, album, artist, and credit

Year	Album	Artist	Credit
2023	Multitudes	Feist	Vocals, Percussion, Field Recording Samples, Engineering
2023	Karpeh	Cautious Clay	Vocals
2022	Nothing Special	Will Sheff	Vocals
2021	Max Heart	Kalbells	Bass, Vocals, Synthesizer, Percussion, Beat Production
2021	Laughing & Eating Cake	LIP TALK	Primary Artist, Producer
2021	Blurry The Explorer	Blurry The Explorer	Composer, Featured Artist, Vocals
2020	Awake in The Brain Chamber	The Secret Machines	Vocals, Keyboards, Group Member
2020	A Dream In the Dark: Two Decades Of Okkervil River (Live)	Okkervil River	Drum Machine, Fender Rhodes, Guitar (Acoustic), Keyboards, Mellotron, Synthesizer, Vocals
2020	Bath	Cuddle Magic	Composer
2019	The Cormorant I & II	San Fermin	Vocals
2019	D A Y S	LIP TALK	Primary Artist, Producer
2018	In the Rainbow Rain	Okkervil River	Group Member, ARP Synthesizer, Keyboard Computer, Mellotron, Moog Synthesizer, Oberheim Synthesizer, Organ (Hammond), Piano, Roland Synthesizer, Synthesizer, Wurlitzer, Vocals
2017	Ashes/Axis	Cuddle Magic	Composer
2015	Bones	Son Lux	Vocals
2014	Madman	Sean Rowe	Piano, Vocals
2012	The Salesman and The Shark	Sean Rowe	Organ, Piano, Vocals
