= BalletCollective =

US non-profit arts collective

- Formation: 5 January 2010
- Founder: Troy Schumacher
- Founded at: New York City, New York
- Website: balletcollective.com

BalletCollective is a New York–based non-profit arts collective that connects artists, composers, and choreographers to create new, ballet-based works. Founded in 2010 by choreographer Troy Schumacher, BalletCollective has been presented by the Metropolitan Museum of Art, Joyce Theater, NYU Skirball Center, Guggenheim Works & Process, Guggenheim Bilbao.

The Night Falls was one of The New York Times "Best Dance Performances of 2023".

== Contributing artists ==
- Troy Schumacher, Choreographer
- Gabrielle Lamb, Choreographer
- Augusta Read Thomas, Composer
- Alex Somers, Composer
- Judd Greenstein, Composer
- Paul Moravec, Composer
- Ellis Ludwig-Leone, Composer
- Caleb Burhans, Composer
- Julianna Barwick, Composer
- Olafur Eliasson, Artist
- Zaria Forman, Source Artist
- Cynthia Zarin, Source Artist
- George Steinmetz, Source Artist
- Ken Liu, Source Artist
- Trevor Paglen, Source Artist
