= Stelth Ulvang =

American singer-songwriter and multi-instrumentalist

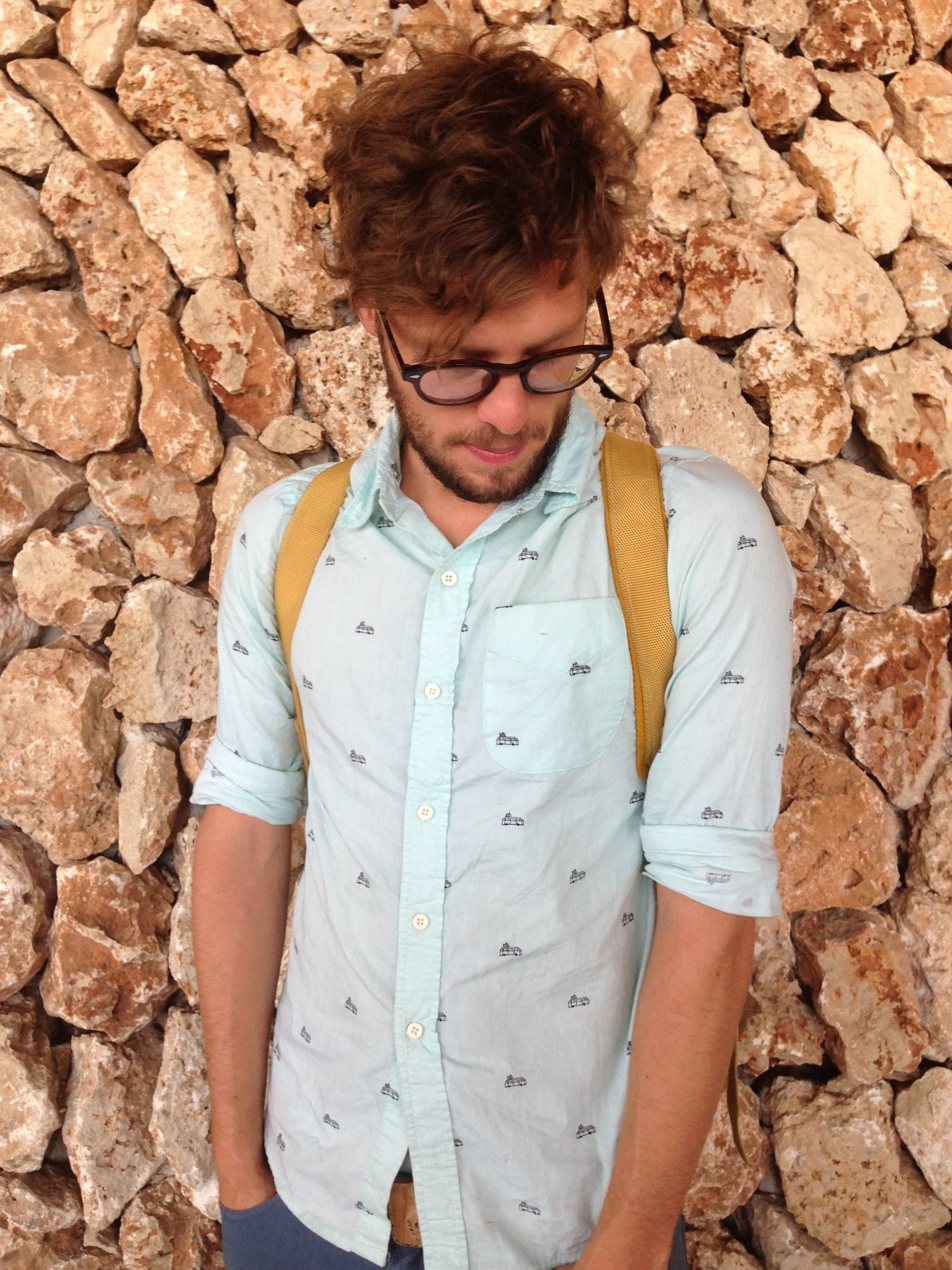
- Ulvang in 2019

Background information
- Born: Fort Collins, Colorado, United States
- Genres: Indie folk; folk rock; indie rock; folk punk; americana; country-folk; alt-country
- Occupations: Musician; singer-songwriter
- Instruments: Piano; keyboard; guitar; accordion; percussion
- Years active: 2009–present
- Formerly of: The Dovekins
- Website: www.stelthulvang.com

Stelth Ulvang is an American musician, singer-songwriter and multi-instrumentalist, best known as a touring member of the folk rock band The Lumineers. He is also the co-founder of the Front Range-based band The Dovekins. In February 2015, Ulvang released his debut album, And, as Always; the Infinite Cosmos. He released three more albums (one LP and two EPs) in 2018.

== Career ==
While working at a coffee shop on Laurel Street in Fort Collins, Ulvang developed an interest in music and decided to become a musician. Being an avid traveler, he used to busk to cover his expenses and has acquired a reputation for performing barefoot on stage.

=== 2009-2011: The Dovekins ===
In 2009, while sailing from Hawaii to Seattle with singer-songwriter Griff Snyder on Robin Lee Graham's The Return of Dove, Ulvang came up with the idea of forming the band The Dovekins. The band's lineup included five members, all rooted in Denver's folk punk scene. The Dovekins generally played mountain-town folk and indie rock style-music. The group released two studio albums, Assemble the Aviary and (A)live, in 2010. After touring regularly, The Dovekins disbanded following a final show in Austin in October 2011. The band has reunited on a few occasions since then, including at the 2018 Treefort festival in Boise.

=== 2011-present: The Lumineers ===
Ulvang came in touch with The Lumineers in 2009, when the latter, seeking advice on self-booking Colorado shows, interacted with him through Myspace. Ulvang joined the band as a touring member in 2011. The Lumineers joined The Dovekins for their first Denver gig. Initially, Ulvang was slated to play bass guitar for The Lumineers, but he later switched to piano. He has assisted in the composition of various songs by The Lumineers, including "Stubborn Love". With The Lumineers, Ulvang has opened for U2 and Tom Petty and the Heartbreakers.

=== 2012-present: Solo career ===
Ulvang started to compose his own music in 2012. He has since released two full-length albums and two EPs. His full-length debut album, And, as Always; the Infinite Cosmos, was released in February 2015. In February 2018, Ulvang released two EPs, Greetings From Perpetual Summer and Take Time, as well as a full-length album entitled American Boredom. TED.com described And, as Always; the Infinite Cosmos as "a balancing act of heavy truths, humour and observation". Ulvang told the Colorado Public Radio that American Boredom is more politically themed than his other albums, which are mostly focused on environmental issues.

In live performances, Ulvang is accompanied by collaborator and drummer Max Barcelow and by multi-instrumentalist Dorota Szuta.

== Musicianship ==
Ulvang's major influences include Paul Simon, Fleetwood Mac, Jason Molina, Weezer, Elton John, Nina Simone, Jonathan Richman, Pavement, Leonard Cohen, Joan Baez, Dave Van Ronk, Tom Waits, Jerry Lee Lewis, Neil Young and Bob Dylan. Among genres, he has been specifically influenced by garage rock. Known for his ability to play a variety of instruments, Ulvang states that he plays more than 18. He mainly plays guitar, piano and mandolin. His favourite gear consists of Collings mandolin, Korg SV1 keyboard and Martin guitars.

In a review of Ulvang's 2017 performance at Café Roux, Tecla Ciolfi wrote: "Ulvang’s impeccably eccentric and charming charisma effortlessly infatuated the audience before him. The artist’s peculiar foot-stomping and incredibly animated antics amongst his powerful, minimally-layered sound was a treat for anyone, familiar or not". Reviewing Ulvang's short-notice performance at the Enmore Theatre in Sydney, The AU review author Carine Nilma wrote: "For a very short-notice stint filling in, Ulvang managed to literally win over the entire room after playing for about half an hour". Folk/rock musician Paul De Haven described Ulvang's American Boredom as the best album of 2018 from the Denver music scene. In a review of a concert by The Lumineers, Lexington Herald-Leader writer Walter Tunis called Ulvang the "MVP of the show" and labeled him "resourceful" for his ability to rapidly change instruments during performances. Ulvang has been praised for his adeptness at playing keyboard and has been seen playing it with his feet on multiple occasions.

== Personal life ==
Ulvang was born in Fort Collins and lived in Loveland. As of 2022, he is married to musician Dorota Szuta, with whom he plays in the band Heavy Gus.

== Discography ==
=== Solo discography ===
Year	Album	Label	Format
2015	And, as Always; the Infinite Cosmos	Self-released	LP, Digital
2018	Greetings from Perpetual Summer	Self-released	CD, Digital
2018	Take Time	Self-released	CD, Digital
2018	American Boredom	Self-released	LP, CD

=== The Dovekins ===
Year	Artist	Album	Co-written with
2010	The Dovekins	"Assemble the Aviary"	Blake Stepan, Laura Goldhamer, Nate Wheeler, Max Barcelow
2010	The Dovekins	"(A)live"	Blake Stepan, Laura Goldhamer, Nate Wheeler, Max Barcelow
