= Troy Schumacher =

American NYCB choreographer

- Born: September 27, 1986 (age 40); Atlanta, GA
- Occupations: Choreographer, Dancer, Artistic Director, Movement Director
- Years active: 2005-Present
- Dancing career
- Current group: New York City Ballet, Founder and Artistic Director of BalletCollective
- Dances: Selected: The Impulse Wants Company (2013), Clearing Dawn (2014), All That We See (2014), Common Ground (2015), Invisible Divide (2015)
- Website: troyschumacher.com

Troy Schumacher is an American choreographer, dancer, and director based in New York City. He is a soloist in the New York City Ballet and has choreographed for the company since 2014; before being promoted to soloist, he danced in NYCB's corps de ballet starting in 2005. He is the founder of Balletcollective, an arts collective that has created new ballet-based works since its inception in 2010. His work has been presented by New York City Ballet, Martha Graham Dance Company, The Metropolitan Museum of Art, Lincoln Center's Mostly Mozart Festival, Performa, Danspace Project, Guggenheim Works & Process, the Joyce Theater, and NYU Skirball Center. In addition to live performances, Schumacher has choreographed numerous fashion and commercial shoots, including works for Sony PlayStation, Capezio featuring Maddie Ziegler, HP, Aritzia, CR Fashion Book, Tom Ford, and The New York Times. He has been dubbed a “visionary artist” by T Magazine and is “one of his generation’s most acclaimed choreographers”

== Choreography and Direction ==
Schumacher has choreographed over 35 ballets. His athletic aesthetic draws upon the artists he collaborates with to produce fresh, unexpected results. During his career, he has collaborated with a wide range of internationally acclaimed artists such as Jeff Koons, Zaria Forman, Doug Fitch, David Salle, and Sergio Mora Diaz, fashion designers Thom Browne, Marques'Almeida, and Jonathan Saunders, composers Ellis Ludwig-Leone, Augusta Read Thomas, Julianna Barwick, Judd Greenstein, Mark Dancigers, Nick Jaina, Alex Somers, writers Karen Rusell, Ken Liu, and Cynthia Zarin, architects James Ramsey and Carlos Arnaiz, and photographers Paul Maffi, Dafy Hagai, Bon Duke, Marcelo Gomes, Mona Kuhn, Emiliano Granado, Ike Edeani, Meyrem Bulucek, and Samantha Casolari. He has choreographed and directed hundreds of dancers from New York City Ballet, American Ballet Theatre, Miami City Ballet, Martha Graham Dance Company, the School of American Ballet, Terminus Modern Ballet Theatre, and the Juilliard School, among others.

While dancing full-time with City Ballet, in 2010 Schumacher founded Balletcollective, a non-profit arts collective. "BalletCollective connects artists, composers, thought leaders and choreographers to create new ballet-based works. Through its collaborative process, BalletCollective expands the boundaries of artistic disciplines in a way that resonates with a wide audience.

Each BalletCollective project takes as its source a contemporary work of art in any medium chosen or commissioned by its choreographer and composer. From this starting point, the choreographer and composer collaborate to create a work that interprets, explores, or responds to its source. The result of the collaboration is performed live. By its nature, BalletCollective consists of a rotating group of artists and collaborators, and with each new collective there are new ideas, new challenges, and, ultimately, new forms of expression emerge."

Since its founding, BalletCollective has produced eighteen ballets, each with original choreography, commissioned music, and source art, and presented ten annual seasons in New York, NY in venues such as The Joyce Theater, NYU Skirball Center and the Baryshnikov Arts Center.

== The Nutcracker at Wethersfield ==
During the Covid-19 pandemic, Schumacher choreographed, produced, and directed The Nutcracker at Wethersfield, both the first live Nutcracker and the first world premiere full length ballet to premiere in the USA. The production was called “true magic,” “remarkable,” and “dreamlike” in the New York Times The production is the subject of the 2025 documentary film The Nutcracker at Wethersfield.

== Dancing career ==
Since joining New York City Ballet in 2005, Schumacher has performed in over 70 ballets, with principal roles in a number of ballets including George Balanchine’s Midsummer Night’s Dream, Agon, Symphony in Three Movements, Mozartiana, The Nutcracker, Vienna Waltzes, Prodigal Son, Union Jack, Suite No. 3 and Stars and Stripes, Jerome Robbins’ Interplay and The Concert, and Alexei Ratmansky’s Concerto DSCH. He has originated roles in ballets by Peter Martins, Benjamin Millepied and Christopher Wheeldon. He was promoted to soloist in 2017.
