= Lavinia Meijer =

Korean Dutch harpist (born 1983)

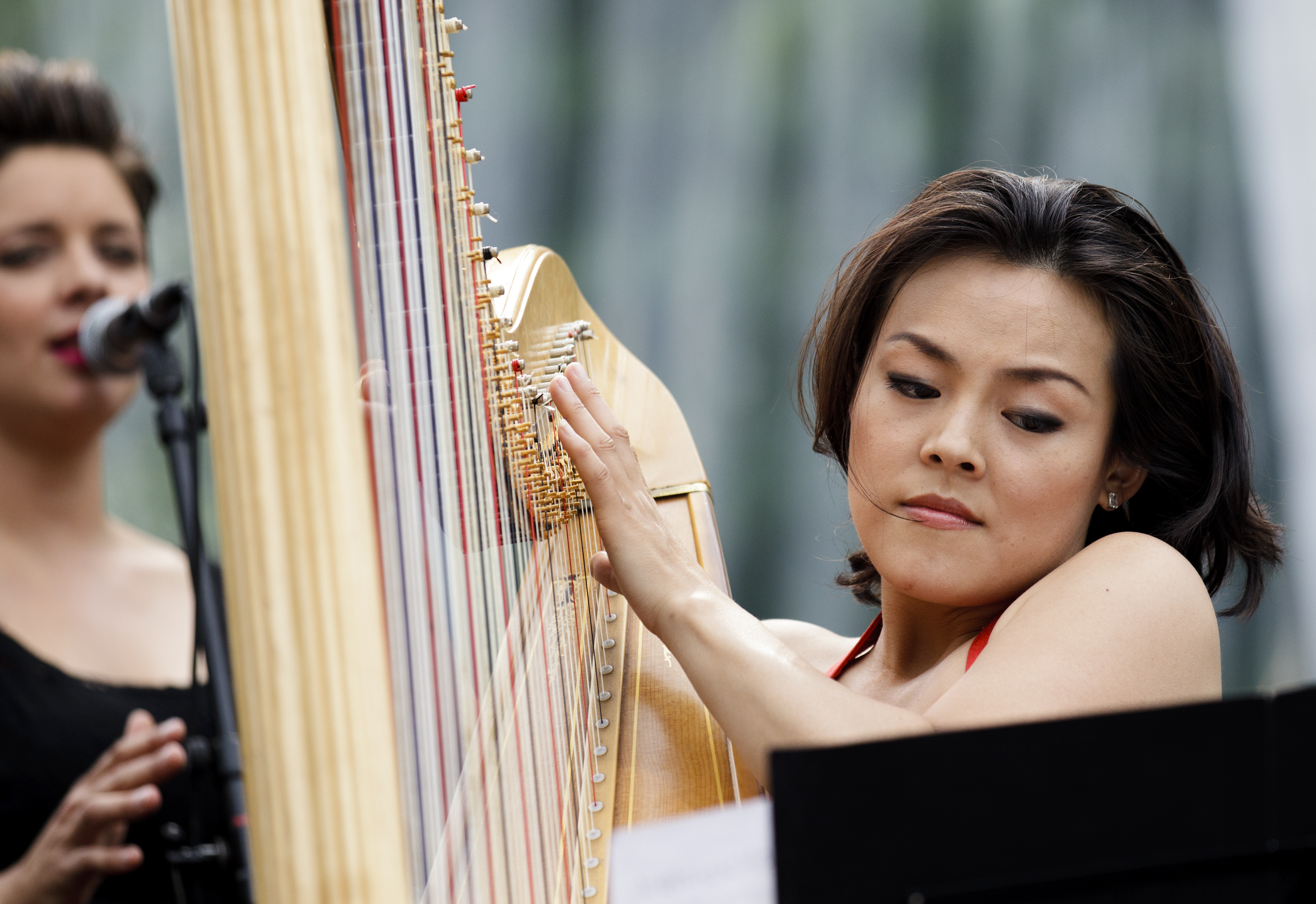
- Lavinia Meijer

Background information
- Born: February 12, 1983 (age 43); South Korea
- Genre: Classical
- Occupation: Harpist
- Instrument: Harp
- Label: Sony
- Website: laviniameijer.com

Lavinia Meijer (born February 12, 1983) is a South Korean-born Dutch harpist. Her concerts have included a solo harp evening at Carnegie Hall in New York City.

== Education ==
Born in South Korea, she was adopted (along with her brother) when she was two years old by a family in the Netherlands. Her adoptive father and mother are Dutch and Austrian, respectively. She began playing the harp when she was nine years old. When she was 11, Meijer was accepted by Erika Waardenburg to study at the Young Talent program of the Utrecht Conservatory. She graduated cum laude from the Utrecht Conservatory in 2003 and obtained a master's degree in music (also cum laude) in 2005 from the Amsterdam Conservatory.

For her master's degree Meijer studied under, among others, Jana Boušková, Isabelle Moretti, Daphne Boden, Natalia Shameyva, Emilia Moskvitina, Maria Graf, Skaila Kanga, and Susann McDonald. She also took a jazz course from the jazz harpist Park Stickney and lessons on interpretation with Theo Olof (violin), Walter van Hauwe (recorder) and Willem Brons (piano).

Besides studying the standard harp repertoire, Meijer also followed masterclasses with musicians practicing other instruments, such as Willem Brons (piano), Anner Bijlsma (cello), Theo Olof (violin), and Ton Koopman (harpsichord).

== Activities ==
Meijer has performed in Europe, Asia, and North America. She has played as a soloist with orchestras, such as the Residentie Orkest, the Radio Symphony Orchestra, the Radio Chamber Orchestra and the Israel Philharmonic Orchestra. She was invited to play during festivals such as the Grachtenfestival Amsterdam, the Schleswig-Holstein Musik Festival and a number of World Harp Congresses. Meijer is also a regular substitute for various orchestras, including the Residentie Orkest and the Koninklijk Concertgebouworkest.

As a featured soloist, Meijer also appeared on several radio programs and TV shows with renowned orchestras. She made her debut in Carnegie Hall, New York City in December 2007, where she was invited to perform an evening harp solo.

=== Special projects ===
In 2004 Meijer made a tour through the Netherlands in the series "Het Debuut" together with the Jenufa Quartet. From 2006 to 2008, she performed in the "Rising Stars" series with concerts in Cologne (Philharmonie), Amsterdam (Concertgebouw), Paris (Cité-de-la-Musique), Vienna (Wiener Musikverein), Birmingham (Symphony Hall), Athens (Concert Hall), Brussels (Paleis voor schone kunsten), Luxembourg (Philharmonie), Stockholm (Konserthus), and New York (Carnegie Hall).

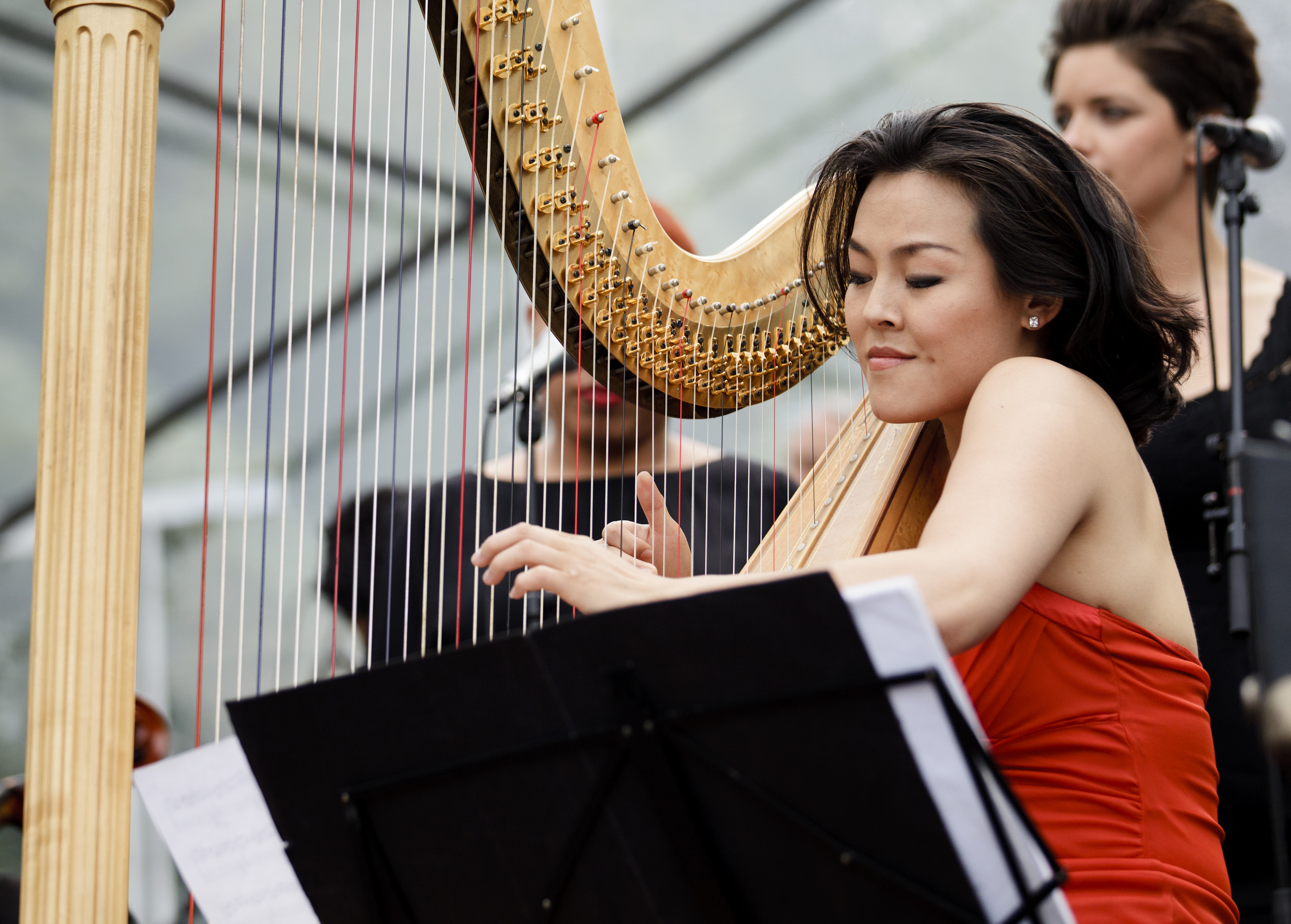
Lavinia Meijer during the Nationaal Concert of 2011 in Utrecht, The Netherlands.

A number of composers, inspired by Meijer's talents, wrote new music especially for her: in 2006, Lavinia, together with the Aurelia Saxophone Quartet, performed new transcriptions of Caplet, Debussy and Ravel, but also two world premieres from the Argentinian composer Carlos Michans and the Dutch composer Wijnand van Klaveren, both of which composed music especially for her and the Aurelia Saxophone Quartet. In 2007 Meijer and Tjeerd Top (violin), performed a world premiere from the American composer Garrett Byrnes at the Concertgebouw in Amsterdam. Furthermore, in 2007, she performed another world premiere piece composed by Carlos Michans at the Vredenburg in Utrecht, together with the Radio Chamber Philharmony conducted by Thierry Fischer.

Meijer's broad interests led her also to experiment with jazz, pop music, and modern classics: in 2012, she released an album with works from Philip Glass that she transcribed for harp and which was approved by Glass himself. The album immediately rose to the top of the Dutch rock charts and Meijer often plays these pieces during candle-lit, acoustic concerts.

In 2014, Meijer released "Passaggio", which consisted of pieces by the Italian composer/pianist Ludovico Einaudi and is critically acclaimed everywhere. This marked her first release on a major record label (Sony Classical Records) and the album immediately became number one on the iTunes Classical Charts.

== CD recordings ==
In 2004, Meijer produced a CD album entitled "1685" with works from Handel, Bach and Scarlatti, which features several self-transcribed preludes and fugues from Bach's Das Wohltemperierte Klavier.

In 2008, Meijer released a Super Audio CD album on Channel Classics Records, entitled "Divertissements" with works from French composers, including Carlos Salzedo, André Caplet and Jacques Ibert.

In 2009, Meijer released a Super Audio CD album, produced by Channel Classics Records, entitled "Visions" with works from 20th century composers, including Benjamin Britten, Paul Patterson, Garrett Byrnes, Isang Yun and Toru Takemitsu.

In 2011, Meijer released a Super Audio CD album, produced by Channel Classics Records, entitled, "Fantasies and Impromptus" with works from, among others, Louis Spohr, Gabriel Fauré, Gabriel Pierné, Camille Saint-Saëns.

In 2012, Meijer released a Super Audio CD album, produced by Channel Classics Records, entitled, "Metamorphosis / The Hours" with works from Philip Glass, transcribed for harp by Meijer, and approved by Glass. The album immediately rose to the top of the Dutch rock charts.

In 2014, Meijer released a CD album produced by Sony Classical Records entitled Passagio, consisting of pieces by the Italian composer and pianist Ludovico Einaudi. This album became number one on the iTunes Classical Charts.

In 2015, Meijer released a CD album produced by Sony Classical Records entitled Voyage, with solo pieces of Yann Tiersen, Claude Debussy and Erik Satie. On three tracks, she played together with Amsterdam Sinfonietta on works by Maurice Ravel and Claude Debussy. Later that year, a live CD album produced by Sony Classical Records entitled In Concert was released. Meijer played together with Carel Kraayenhof, a Dutch bandoneon player. The album contained work by Luis Bacalov, Enrique Granados, Carel Kraayenhof, Astor Piazzolla, Anselmo Aieta, Jorge Cardoso, Meijer herself, Pintín Castellanos, Ennio Morricone, and Mariano Mores.

== Recent albums ==
Year	Title	Label
2016	"The Glass Effect"	Sony Classical
2020	"Peaceful Choir – New Sound of Choral Music"	Sony Classical
2022	"Are You Still Somewhere?"	Sony Classical

== Prizes and recognition ==
Meijer has won numerous prizes. She won the first prize at the Prinses Christina Competition (1997), the Stichting Jong Muziek Talent Nederland (1996, 1998), the Nederlands Harp Competition (1997, 2004), and the Vriendenkrans contest from the Concertgebouw in Amsterdam (2005).

Meijer also won prizes at several large international harp competitions: the second prize at the International Harp Competition in Lausanne (1998), the third prize at the International Harp Competition in Lille (1999), the first prize at the International Harp Competition in Brussels (2000), the third prize at the International Harp Competition in Israel (2001), the second prize at the Reinl-Wettbewerb in Vienna (2002), and the third prize at the Sixth International USA Harp Competition in America (2004).

Furthermore, Meijer has won prizes for the best interpretation of Visions in Twilight from Garrett Byrnes and the harp concerto in B-flat major from Georg Friedrich Händel. In 2005, she was awarded the Cultuurprijs from Ede for her promotion of the harp as a solo instrument. This prize was presented to her by the renowned Herman Krebbers.

In 2007, Meijer was awarded the Fellowship from the Borletti-Buitoni Trust in London, as well as the MeesPierson Award at the Concertgebouw (Amsterdam) together with violinist Tjeerd Top.

In 2009, Meijer was awarded the Dutch Music Prize, the highest distinction for a classical musician in the Netherlands.

In 2012, Meijer received the Edison Award Public's Prize, for her CD Fantasies and Impromptus.

In 2013, Meijer's "Metamorphosis / The Hours" (Philip Glass) CD was awarded Gold Record and Platinum Record status for classical music in the Netherlands by The Dutch Association of Producers and Importers of image- and sound carriers.
