= Kevin Dreyer =

American lighting designer

Kevin Dreyer is an American lighting designer of dance, theatre, opera and film, Full professor of Theatre at the University of Notre Dame and resident lighting designer for the Notre Dame Shakespeare Festival. Dreyer is also a dance lighting reconstructor for the works of Gerald Arpino, Moses Pendleton and Kurt Jooss.

== Early life ==
A third-generation performer, Dreyer was born at Fort McClellan, an Army base in Anniston, Alabama. During his youth, he never lived in the same place for more than three years since his father worked as a singer, actor, teacher, and for the Quaker's American Friends Service Committee, a pacifist organization that staff community service projects. When Dreyer was about to enter the tenth grade, his father joined the drama faculty at the North Carolina School of the Arts. "We decided that if I wanted to have my own identity, I shouldn't go in for acting, so I went for design and production, thinking that if I had trouble getting a job acting, stage managing would be a good fallback," he says. "By the time I got to college, acting was no longer calling me as it had." Dreyer observed ballet classes at NCSA to get a clear sense of the process.

== Training and influence ==
Dreyer received a BFA in Stage Design and Technical Design from Carnegie-Mellon University in 1975. "I don't like sawdust, so I gravitated toward lighting. What I discovered, also, about myself is that I'm an impatient person in ways. The thought of waiting four to six weeks to see a design realized is excruciating. I am really drawn to the speed that's involved in designing lighting." He was influenced as a designer while stage managing for choreographer and lighting designer Alwin Nikolais' Nikolais Dance Theatre. "From Nikolais, Dreyer learned the importance of detail and acquired a knack for striking a human chord." "He was the first person to be entrusted with the original lighting created by Alwin Nikolais." Dreyer was also exposed to 'dance pieces that would start entirely from visual design.' "I took away the courage to experiment. Nikolais' true genius was his ability to spot the right thing in the midst of an accident. He had no preconceived rules. Anything was valid. And that's where you find the magic."

== Lighting design for the stage ==
Dreyer's lighting designs for theatre, opera, and dance have been seen throughout the U.S. and in Europe, South America, and Asia with such companies as Paris Opera Ballet, La Compañia Nacional, Opera Teresa Carreño, Ballet du Nord, Momix, ISO, DanzaHoy, American Ballet Theatre (The Green Table) and the Joffrey Ballet.

Dreyer began an association with the Joffrey after 1995 as a lighting designer and lighting director for reconstructions since the company moved to Chicago, working with them in the city, for their yearly Nutcracker Ballet since 1998 and on tours, including a recent tour to Amsterdam.

Dreyer's lighting design credits for the Joffrey include I/DNA, Ruth Ricore Per Due, and Partita for RC.

In addition to his work for the Joffrey, Dreyer has designed for the Chicago Shakespeare Festival's Short Shakespeare production of The Comedy of Errors and for Giordano Dance Chicago, including lighting for Pyrokinesis, and Impulse.

Dreyer has been called upon to reconstruct the lighting for dances produced by Joffrey Ballet and American Ballet Theatre. Don Atwood's 2005 review of Dreyer's lighting reconstruction for Kurt Jooss' The Green Table by American Ballet Theatre speaks of the attention to detail Dreyer learned from Alwin Nikolais (see training, below): "Kevin Dreyer's implementation of the Jooss/Anna Markard lighting design makes Stappas’ terrifying 'Death' ubiquitous, appearing and disappearing magically and seemingly at will, eventually capturing 'The Standard Bearer' and all else."

== Lighting design in film ==
Dreyer's lighting design is featured in Paramount Pictures’s Save the Last Dance and the Robert Altman feature, The Company.

== Recognition ==
Dreyer's lighting designs have been reviewed in The New York Times on seven separate occasions for his work with The Joffrey, MOMIX, and others since 1987. Dreyer was featured in the article "Lighting a Christmas Classic," in the magazine Stage Directions in 2004.

His design work in Venezuela was nominated for a national critic's award, and he has been heralded as a "wizard lighting designer" by Dance reviewer Deborah Jowitt in the Village Voice for his work with Momix. In 2000, Anna Kisselgoff, dance reviewer for The New York Times called his work with the Joffrey Ballet "brilliant". and acknowledged his lighting and shadow play for MOMIX's Woomen in 1987. Jowitt, in her ballet review of a Frederick Ashton Celebration in 2004, described how Dreyer's lighting enhanced the costumes: "In their gleaming unitards and elvish caps, molded by Kevin Dreyer's lights, the dancing figures inhabit a frieze in process, dreamily making and unmaking it in a timeless golden void." Joffrey Ballet co-founder/artistic director Gerald Arpino commended Dreyer for 'his ability to work with the art of the ballet itself—it's about how the lights make the most aesthetic sense for the ballet.'

== Other activities ==
Dreyer began working with the University of Notre Dame's Theatre program in 1986, and he joined the Film, Theatre and Television faculty in 1989. In addition to teaching theatre courses, he has been the Resident Lighting Designer for the Notre Dame Shakespeare Festival since its inception in 2000 and was the Producing Artistic Director in 2011.

Dreyer is a member of the United States Institute for Theatre Technology(USITT), United Scenic Artists 829 and the International Alliance of Theatre and Stage Employees (IATSE). YouTube shows Dreyer teaching for USITT's 2009 show, teaching on 'lighting various skintones','using color', 'the basics of lighting', 'how to design', and 'do lighting colors change?'.

Dreyer is the past president of South Bend Civic Theatre, serving as president in 2011. According to Andrew Hughes of the South Bend Tribune, Dreyer is also the president of the board of Morris Entertainment Inc. and president of Michiana Youth Ministries.
