= Jeanette Vondersaar =

American dancer and choreographer (born 1951)

Jeanette Vondersaar (born May 17, 1951) is an American dancer and choreographer. She is a principal dancer with the Dutch National Ballet (1977–1994) and, since 2010, as répétiteur, supervisor and stager for Kurt Jooss' anti-war ballet The Green Table.

== Early life and education ==
Vondersaar was born on May 17, 1951, in Indianapolis, the son of Albert Leroy "Lee" Vondersaar and Tatiana "Jane" Vondersaar. She is of Polish, Russian and Cherokee ancestry. Her mother, born in Poland to a Polish father and a mother of Russian descent, was a founder of Russian Heritage, a Florida-based organization that preserves, promotes and educates the public on Russian history and culture, and provides funding for related charitable causes. In 2005, Representative Gus Bilirakis awarded Tatiana Vondersaar a Congressional Medal for her patriotism and contributions to American life.

Vondersaar's father served in the Coast Guard during World War II and later worked as an engineering expert in the tool and die industry. She has three brothers and two sisters. Her older sister Margo is married to American billionaire businessman John Catsimatidis.

Vondersaar began studying ballet at age 8 through the Jordan College of Fine Arts Special Instruction Division at Butler University. Her teachers included Jack Copeland, Karl Kaufman and George Verdak. In the early 1960s, she performed in several Footlite Musicals productions, among them The King and I, South Pacific, Oklahoma, The Music Man and Carousel.

While at Butler, Vondersaar was awarded a Margaret Sear Rosenblith scholarship, which helps fund outstanding student dancers. In 1966, she accepted a scholarship to Harkness House for Ballet Arts, the school of Harkness Ballet, and moved to New York City.

== Dance career ==
Vondersaar was selected for Harkness Youth Dancers, a junior company of Harkness Ballet, in 1968. After a debut in Central Park, the company of 17 dancers toured throughout New York, New Jersey, New England, Pennsylvania, Virginia and Texas in 1969 and 1970. While with the troupe, she was photographed by Jack Robinson for an Isadora Duncan-inspired fashion feature published in Vogue (August 1969).

When Harkness Youth Dancers became the new Harkness Ballet, Vondersaar was made a featured soloist. (The first Harkness Ballet, founded in 1964 with core members from Joffrey Ballet, was dissolved in 1970 and re-established using dancers trained at Harkness House.) The company toured Europe before a 1972 U.S. debut at the Kennedy Center in Washington D.C. Vondersaar danced the world premiere of the revamped company's Firebird ballet, choreographed by Brian MacDonald, at the event. The company disbanded permanently the following year.

After a year with Zürich Opera Ballet, Vondersaar joined The Dutch National Ballet as a soloist in 1976. Her rise to principal dancer came shortly afterward.

Vondersaar took the lead in many classical ballets, including Swan Lake, The Sleeping Beauty, Cinderella, Giselle, Romeo and Juliet, Apollo, Ètudes, Theme and Variations, The Firebird, and pas de deux from Le Corsaire and Don Quixote. She also performed modern works: Martha Graham's Lamentation and Diversion of Angels, as well as pieces by the company's three resident choreographers Rudi van Dantzig's Onder Mijne Voeten (Under My Feet); Toer van Schayk's Life and Faun, and Hans van Manen's Pose and 5 Tangos.

As part of a special production in 1978, she danced three performances of Faun with Rudolf Nureyev.

An illustrated book, Cry of the Firebird, Jeanette Vondersaar, Profile of a Dancer. An Album in 5 Parts was published in 1977. It covers her career from childhood musical appearances to her position as a soloist with Dutch National Ballet.

=== Reviews ===
Vondersaar was regarded as a powerful, energetic, technically exceptional dancer with substantial dramatic gifts.

During her stint with Harkness Ballet, a New York Times critic wrote, "Jeanette Vondersaar handled the bouncy demands of the "Shakers" solo confidently, throwing off flurries of energetic gesture while moving relentlessly through the somewhat dogged rhythm of the piece.

Of her performance in Ben Stevenson's Three Preludes, another reviewer said, "Miss Vondersaar is at one moment all grace and softness, at the next, sharp and angular."

In her critique of Hans van Manen's duet Piano Variations II, New York Times critic Anna Kisselgoff described Vondersaar as "a full-bodied dramatic dancer, giving every movement its complete shape."

=== As a choreographer ===
Beginning in the 1986–87 season, Vondersaar choreographed four ballets for the Dutch National Ballet. One and One Is Three was set to piano music of Alexander Scriabin. The dance depicts a woman's split personality in relation to her partner. Po Mo d'Or was a jazzy solo work with music by the bands Inner Spirits and Star Inc. Synthese was choreographed to music by British avantgarde composer Jan Steele - Has Ras and minimalist German composer Peter Michael Hamel - Nada. MIDI-terranee was a pas de deux with music by Arthur Cune.

== Post performing ==
Vondersaar began teaching in 1980, long before she considered retiring from the stage. As an instructor and coach, she worked with Dutch National Ballet, Nederlands Dans Theater, Introdans, Scapino Ballet, The Royal Winnipeg Ballet, Finnish National Ballet, Stadtheater Bern, Aalto Ballet Theatre, Krisztina de Châtel, Israel Ballet, Ballet Arizona, Pacific Northwest Ballet, Joffrey Ballet and American Ballet Theatre, among others.

Once past her performing prime, Vondersaar continued to dance with Dutch National Ballet in character roles: Lady Capulet in Romeo and Juliet, Bathilde in Giselle, The Queen Mother in Sleeping Beauty and others. Vondersaar told a reporter, "Not everyone wants to do it, but I just thought it was a nice idea" and a way to "wind down my dancing career" while keeping touch with the company.

In 1994, she received the VSCD (Association of Theatres and Concert Halls Directors) Golden Theatre Dance Prize. On awarding the honor, the jury said, "She has remarkable technique and enormous energy. Her inner drive and sensual, temperamental presence make her a powerful female soloist." The same year, she was presented with the Alexandra Radius Prize from Friends of Dutch National Ballet.

Vondersaar was Ballet Mistress for the company from 1994 to 1996.

== The Green Table ==
Vondersaar first saw Kurt Jooss' The Green Table as a Harkness trainee in the 1960s. The Joffrey Ballet had revived the 1932 work at the height of the Vietnam War, first presenting it at Manhattan's City Center on March 9, 1967.

Vondersaar would go on to regularly dance the role of "The Partisan" in Dutch National Ballet productions. She worked briefly with Jooss himself on the ballet, but was coached primarily by his eldest daughter Anna Markhard.

In 1996, when the piece was being taped for Dutch television, Markhard gave Vondersaar the option of dancing or assisting her with the staging. Vodersaar chose the latter. For years, she assisted Marhard in preserving her father's legacy. travel With Markhard's 2010 death, Vondersaar took on the task of keeping the ballet alive.

Vondersaar says:

It's a huge honour, but also a tremendous responsibility. Because unfortunately we're seeing again today the atrocities induced by war and conflict. The Green Table gives people plenty of food for thought. The fate of refugees, people who profit from war, the futility of violence: Jooss incorporated all of that into his ballet. So it's my job to ensure the work is performed at the highest possible standard, because only then does it have the intended effect.
