= Joffrey Tower =

Building in Chicago, Illinois

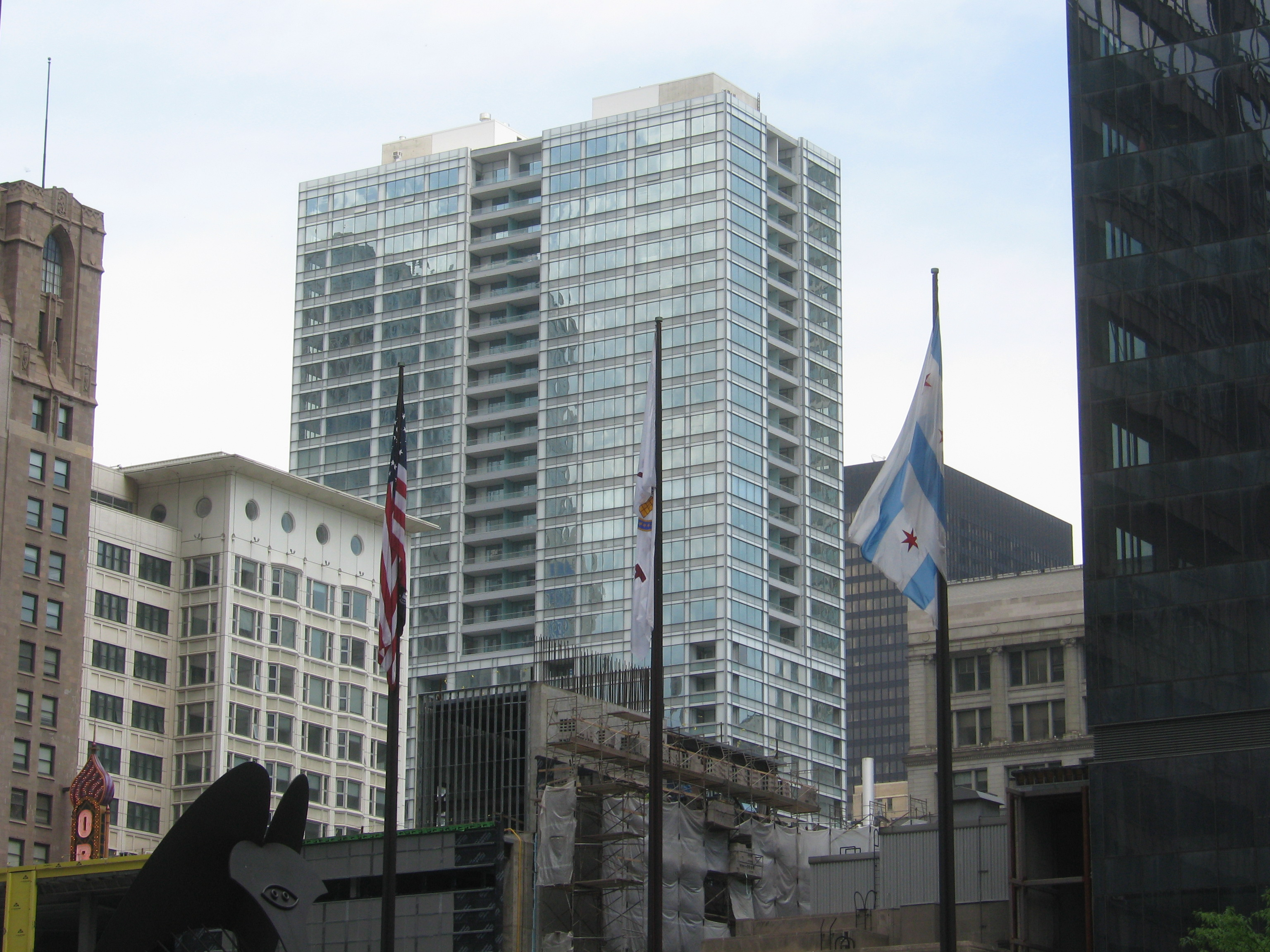
- Joffrey Tower behind Block 37 (June 2, 2008)
- Interactive map of the Joffrey Tower area

General information
- Status: Completed
- Location: 8 East Randolph Street (@ State Street); Chicago, Illinois
- Coordinates: 41.884611°N 87.627597°W
- Opening: 2008

Height
- Roof: 125 m (410 ft)

Technical details
- Floor count: 31

Design and construction
- Architect: Booth Hansen
- Developer: Smithfield Properties

The Joffrey Tower is a high-rise commercial real estate development on the northeast corner of North State Street and East Randolph Street in the Loop community area of Chicago in Cook County, Illinois, United States that is the permanent home of the Joffrey Ballet. It is located immediately south of the Chicago Theatre and directly across the street from Macy's largest Chicago (and its second largest overall) department store on State Street, within the Loop Retail Historic District. Its address had once been the site of the Chicago Masonic Temple. The placement of the Joffrey Ballet in this building appears to have involved political dealings with the Mayor of Chicago, Richard M. Daley and his brother, William M. Daley, a co-chairman of the Joffrey board of trustees. The building was scheduled for completion in December 2007, but was not finished until September 12, 2008.

== Details ==
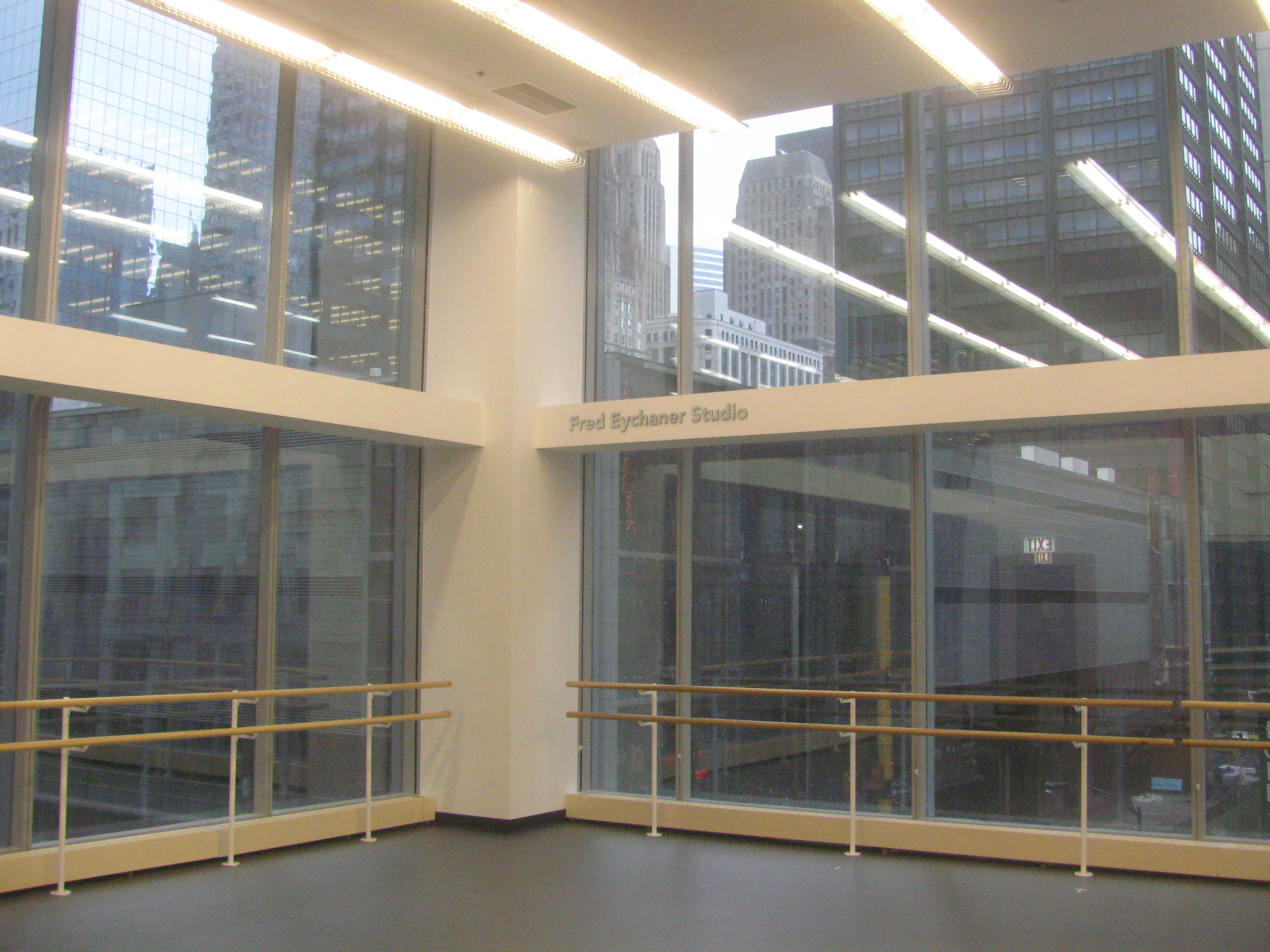
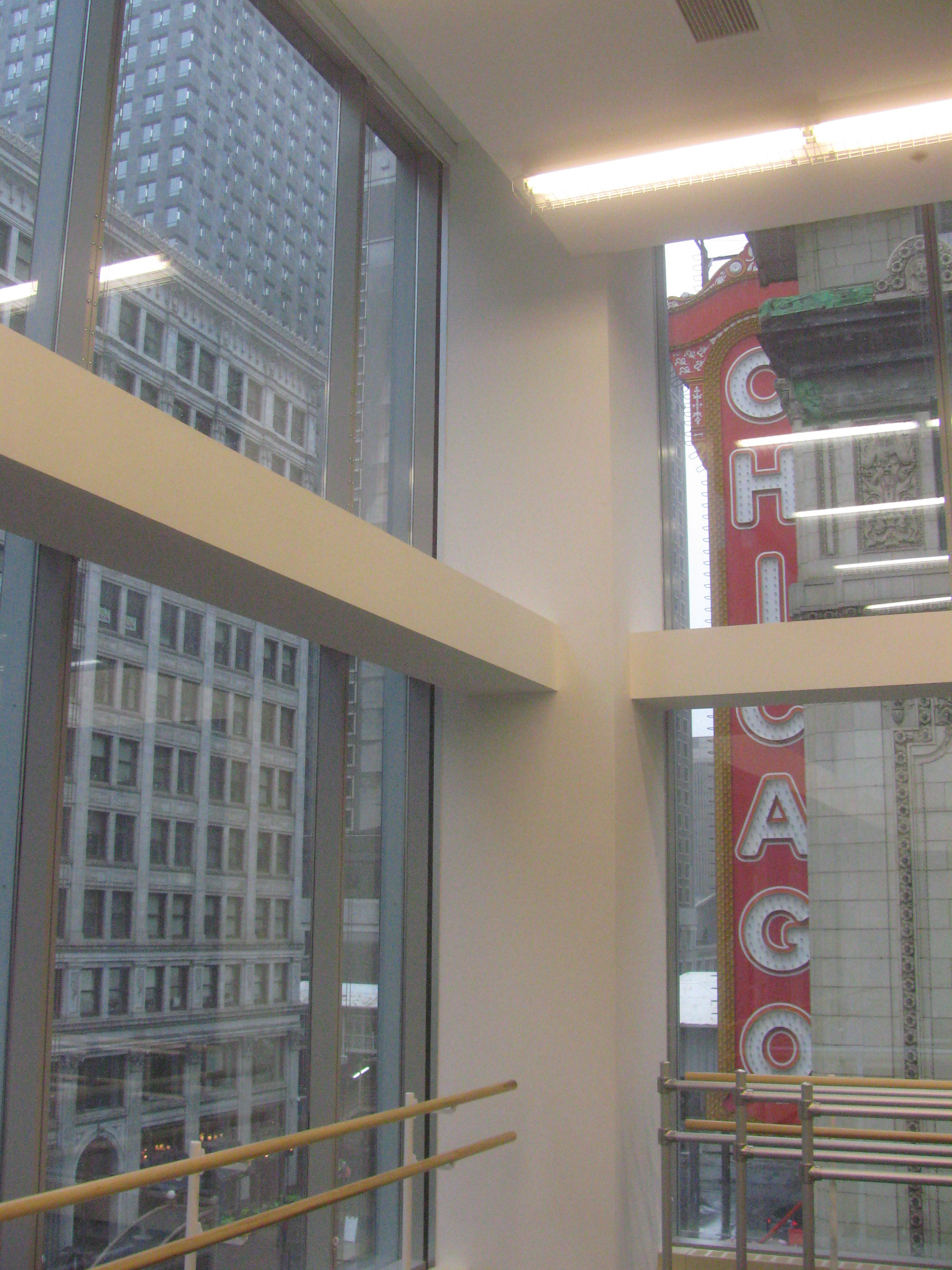
The rehearsal studios along State Street have views of Block 37 (top) and the Chicago Theatre marquee (bottom).

The building was originally named the Modern Momentum Building (nicknamed the MoMo). Like the ballet company, it has been named after Robert Joffrey, co-founder of the company. The Joffrey Ballet acquired the naming rights when it purchased 45,000 square feet (4,200 m^{2}) of space on the third and fourth floors to serve as its new permanent home. The floors include the Joffrey administrative offices plus seven state-of-the-art rehearsal studios and a black-box theatre. The building occupies the southwest quarter of the block bounded by North State Street to the West, North Wabash Street to the East, East Randolph Street to the South, and East Lake Street to the North. The Modern Momentum Project now holds the Joffrey name when the Ballet company took possession (originally anticipated in December 2007). The first two floors of the Joffrey Tower house retail tenants and floors 9 through 32 host residential condominiums. All four of the foundation floors are 14 feet (4.3 m) high. The four-story cutout above the foundation and green roof is capped by "legs" with only elevators and stairwells that compensate for the fact the building does not have the typical lower level parking spaces to improve the views by raising the units. The building's main largest rehearsal space had been named the Arpino Studio in honor of Gerald Arpino, Joffrey Ballet co-founder and artistic director emeritus.

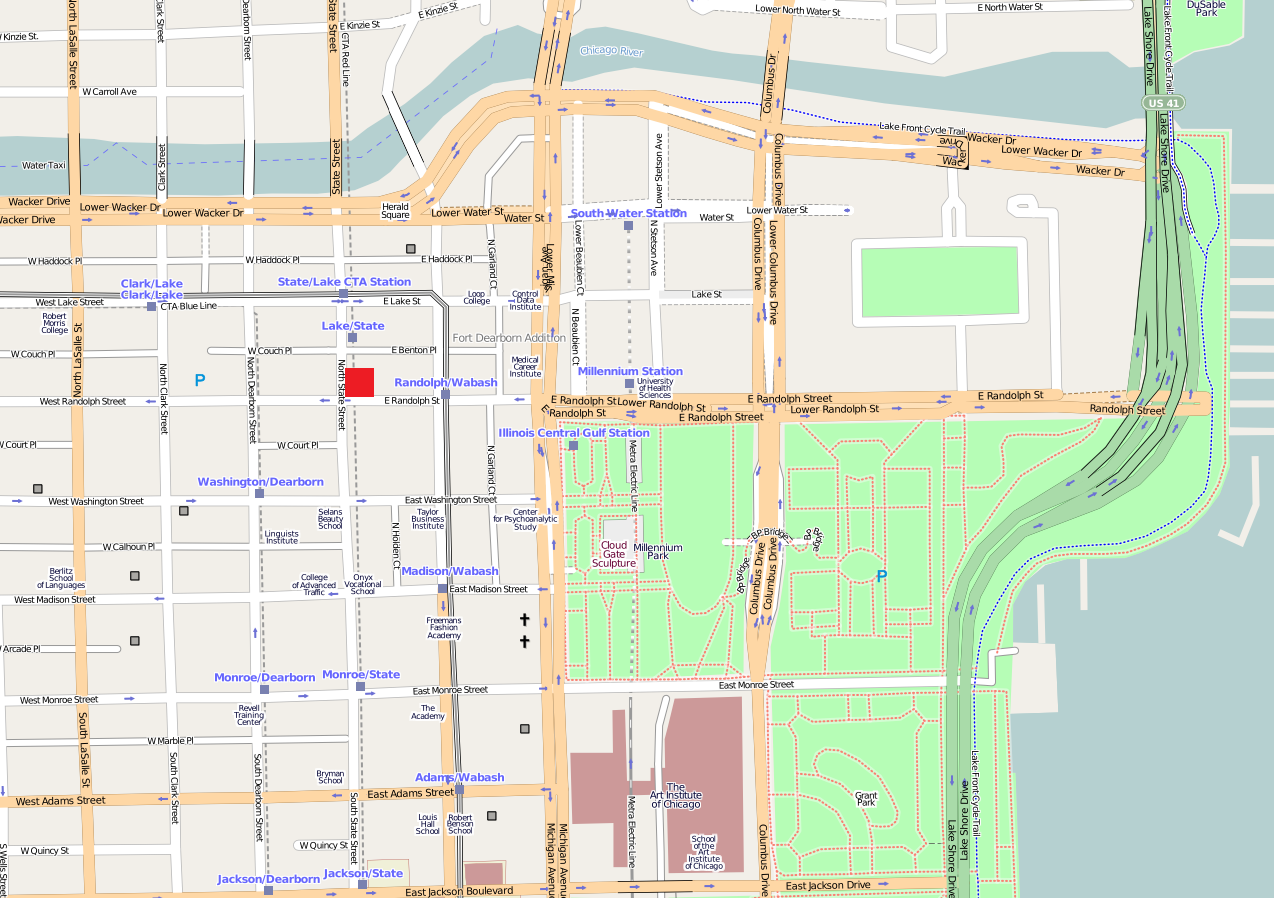
Joffrey Tower location (red square) in Chicago's Loop community area.

The building was originally scheduled for completion in December 2007 with the official renaming and company move accompanying the completion. By January 2008, the anticipated grand opening had been rescheduled to occur in the summer of 2008. The grand opening events, including performances by Shelley MacArthur and Ramsey Lewis, were sponsored by The PrivateBank, Bank of America, and the McCormick Foundation. July 2008 advertisements announced a September 12, 2008 opening night and a set of opening events from September 11 to 15.

The building was designed by Booth Hansen Architects. Construction started in 2005 and was completed for the September 2008 grand opening. The height of the structure is 409 feet (125 m) (including spires and antennae).

The September 11, 2008, free performance at the Jay Pritzker Pavilion served the dual purpose of heralding the grand opening weekend and paying tribute to the September 11 attacks victims. Other events during the grand opening weekend included a September 12 black tie gala, September 13 Tower tours, and September 15 party and fashion show. The September 15 event also included an auction for various items, including a pair of $25,000 Van Cleef and Arpels diamond earrings.

== History ==
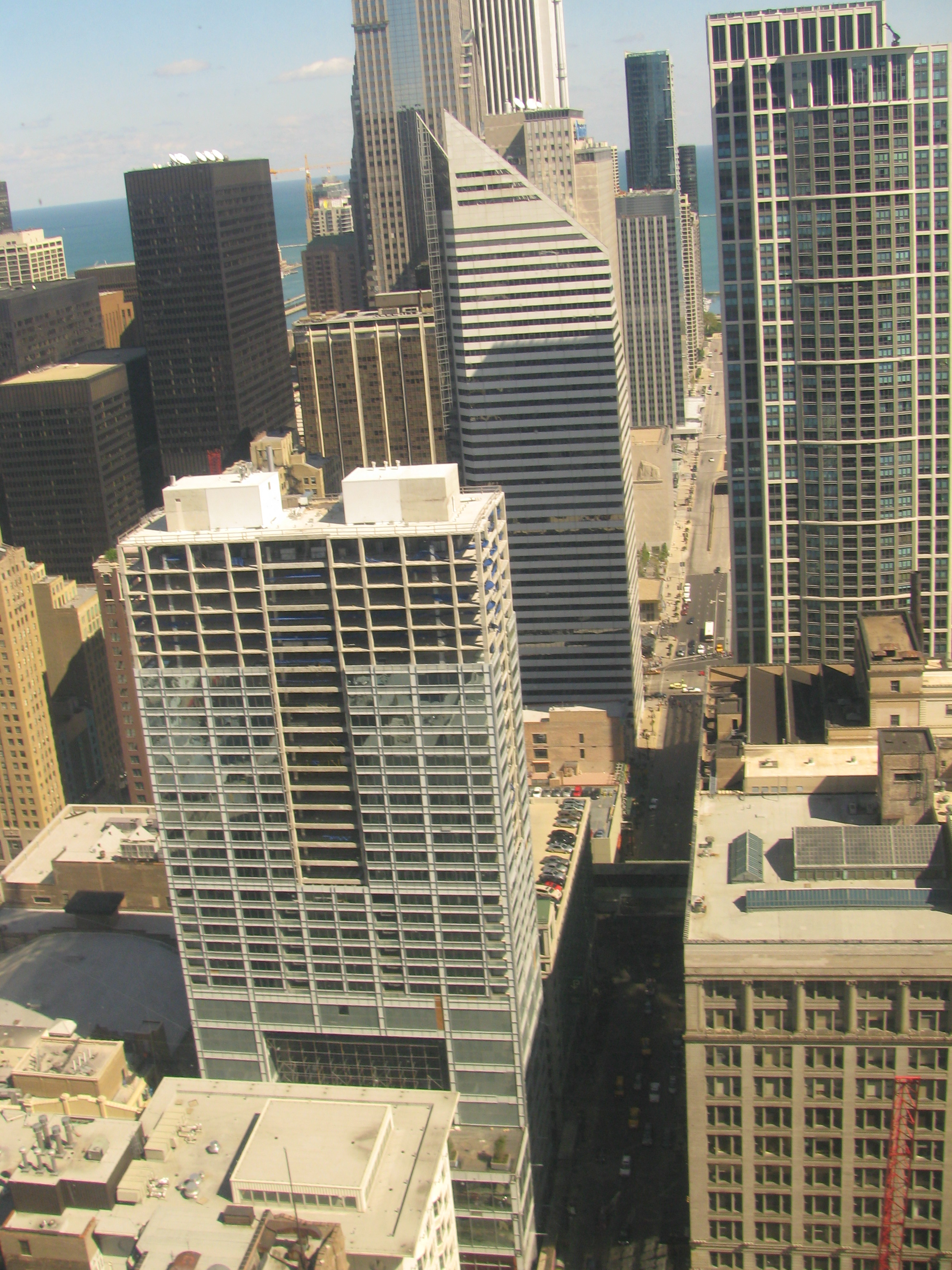
September 14, 2007 - Joffrey Tower Construction from Richard J. Daley Center Also:(South Side of Randolph Front to back Macy's Flagship at State Street, The Heritage, Millennium Park, Lake Michigan, North Side 150 North Michigan Avenue, Two Prudential Plaza, Aon Center)

The building is located on the site of the former Masonic Temple, which had once been the tallest building in Chicago. Since the demolition of the Masonic Temple, the address had housed a two-story retail building. One failed previous plan to replace the small retail building on the site was the Market Hall Tower, proposed in 2000, which was to have a two-story European style food market and 75 spacious apartments in the adjacent 26-story, 291-foot (89 m) tower. Another failed plan was the subsequent 33-story Randolph Court design.

The Daley administration has been a proponent of the Joffrey Ballet having a permanent Theatre District home in order to establish it as a major Chicago institution. However, the cost of building their own building at State and Lake was prohibitive. Supposedly, the city of Chicago held the development of this project hostage until the developer agreed to the Joffrey initiative. The delay tactic used was to delay closing long enough to cause the developer to have to file suit. William Daley, a co-chairman of the Joffrey board of trustees, is a former Cabinet member in the Clinton administration and clout-heavy brother of Chicago's former mayor, Richard M. Daley. The arts-loving mayor has revitalized the Loop in part by re-establishing a central theatre district. The Joffrey Tower is within three blocks of Cadillac Palace, Chicago, Goodman, Harris, Ford Center/Oriental, and Storefront Theatres, as well as the Chicago Cultural Center, the Tiffany-decorated former central library.

== Center Stage Campaign ==
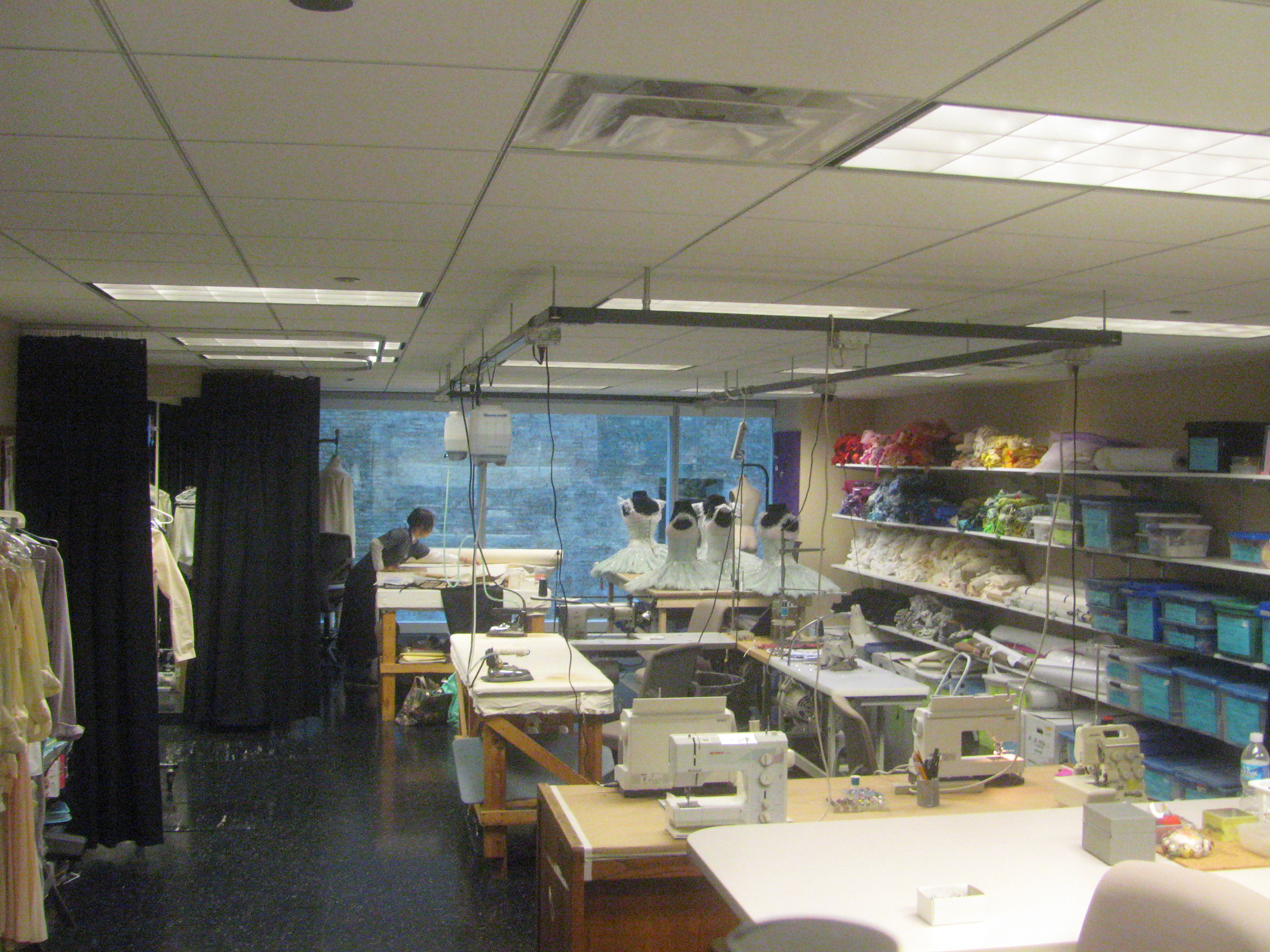
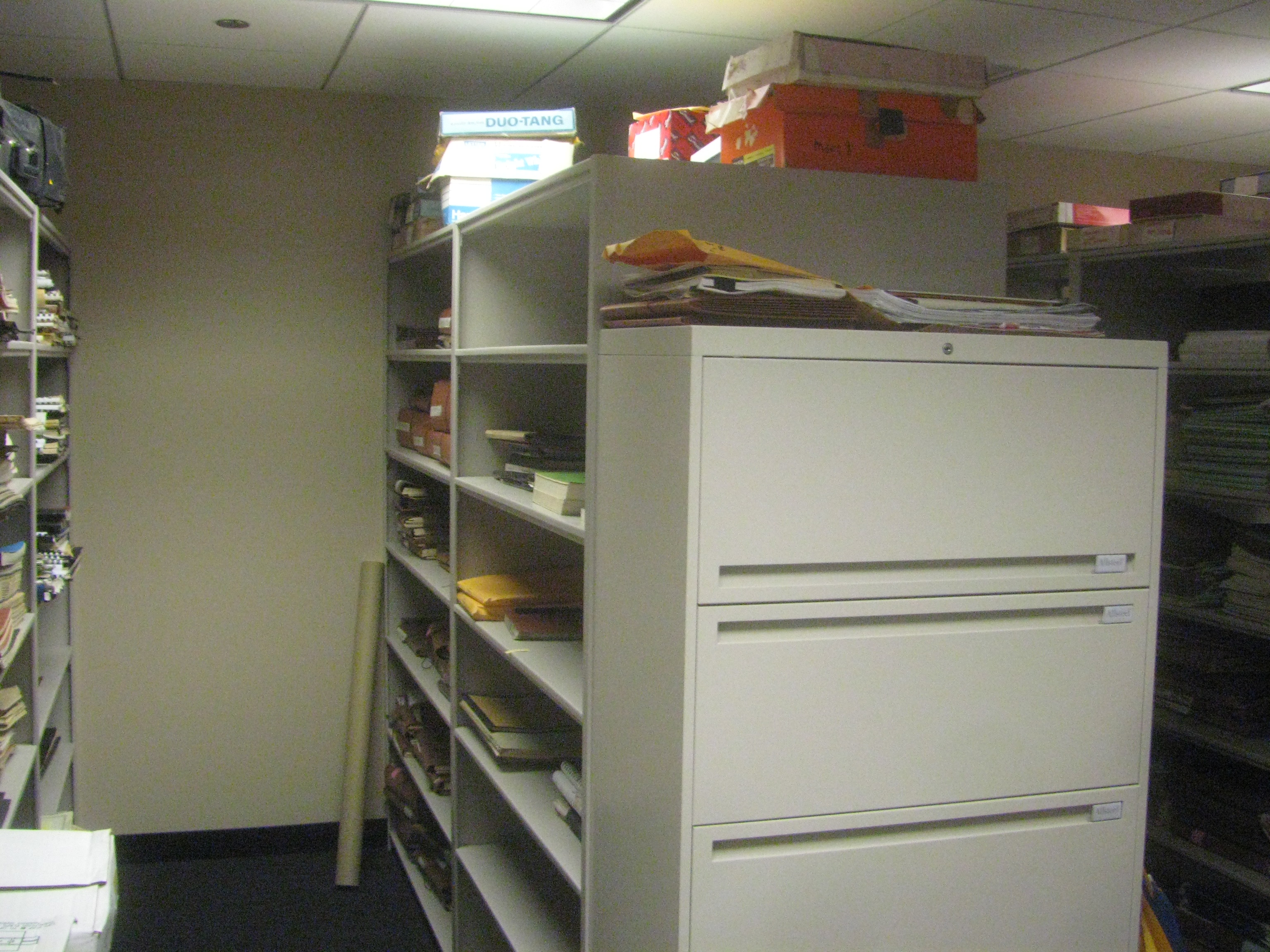
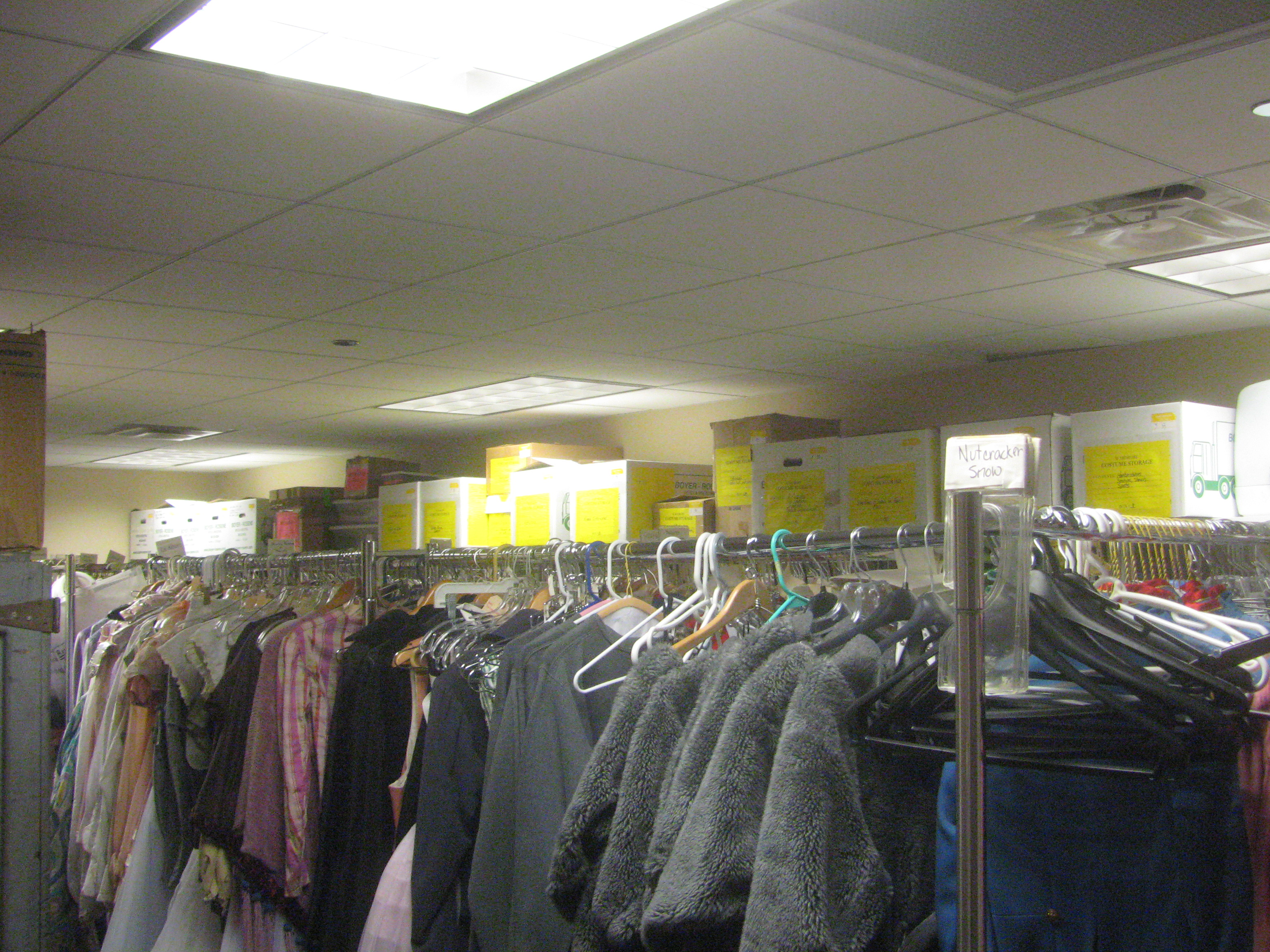
The third floor costume room, musical archives room and storage room.

The Joffrey Ballet launched its first Chicago capital campaign on March 7, 2007. As of May 2008, it has raised $30 million towards a goal of $35 million for Joffrey Tower construction costs and an endowment. When the purchase was finalized, the Joffrey had $2.5 million in reserves and the state had recently approved a $4 million grant. The construction costs alone were estimated to be $21 million. The fundraising enticements include the possibility that for $10 million a corporate donor could acquire renaming rights to the entire building and for lesser amounts they could acquire naming rights for various specific spaces. Facility details released at the hard hat preview and launch include the following:

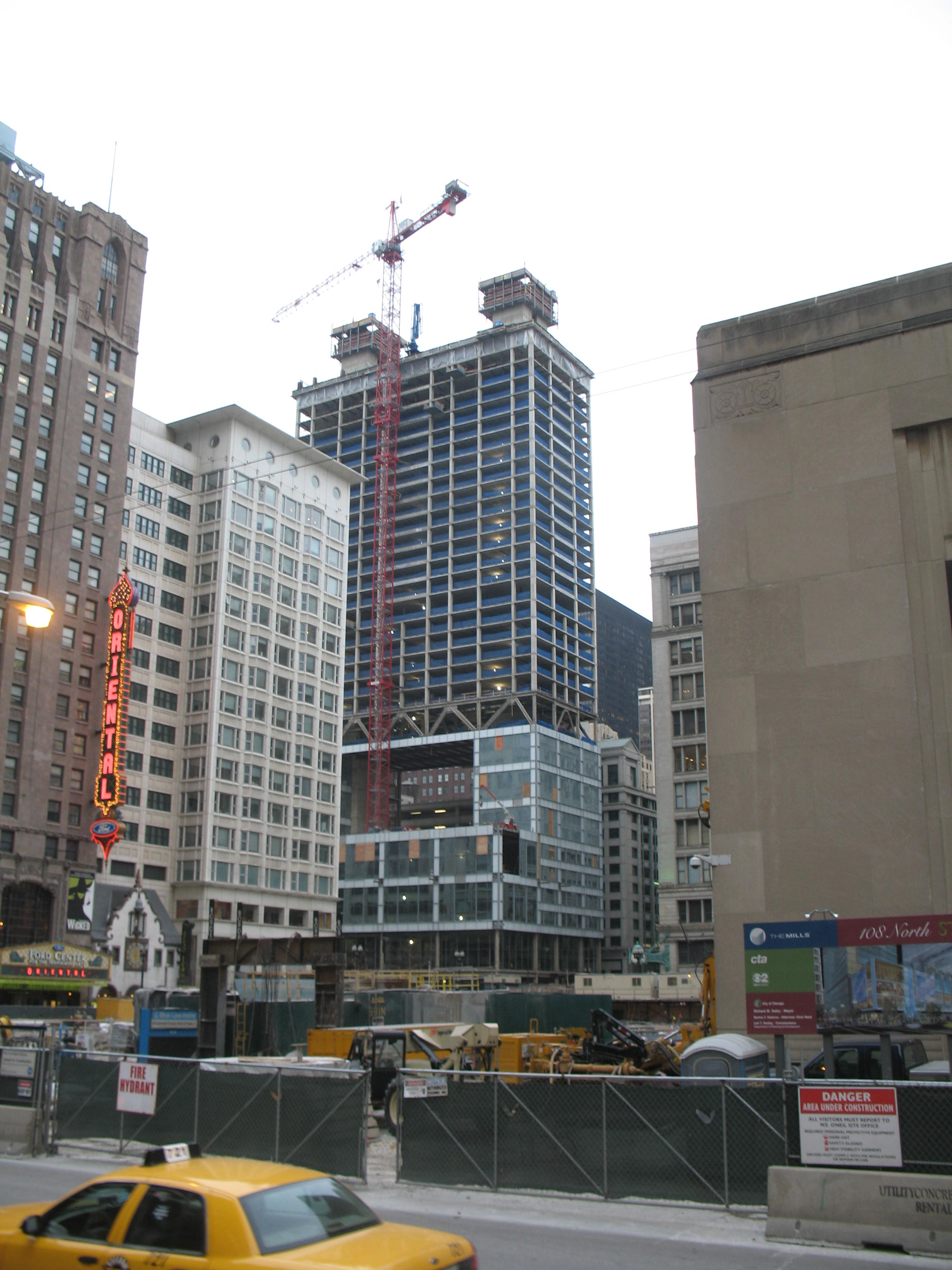
Block 37 was under construction at the same time as the Joffrey Tower.

- A dedicated entrance and elevators on Randolph Street, with a lobby box office selling tickets to company events.
- A "black box" theater space that will serve primarily as a full-company rehearsal space but, with its lighting booth and fully foldable seating for 144, also can double as an intimate showcase for open rehearsals, works-in-progress viewings and more. When unused, the studio also can be rented to visiting dance companies.
- An additional six rehearsal studios with high ceilings and no obstructions. The Joffrey could use these for classes if it starts a school here. For now they will be the site of activities related to the Joffrey's extensive outreach school programs.
- Locker rooms, dressing rooms, showers, wardrobe and laundry suites, a lounge, physical therapy areas, and artistic and executive staff offices.
- A Green roof to cover the Joffrey part of the building.

In Chicago, the administration and the performers had previously been in separate buildings. The Joffrey Ballet had rented both a 17,000-square-foot (1,600 m^{2}) rehearsal studio at 17 N. State Street, which it leased in July 2005, and administrative offices at 70 E. Lake Street. The Joffrey now has the company's creative leadership, dancers, administration, technical staff, guest artists, students, and apprentices united under one roof, creating streamlined operations and a more efficient and accomplished organization. The new space nearly doubles the current space. The planned space allows the company to rehearse and present more of its repertoire, mount additional full-length ballets, extend its apprentice program, launch additional revivals, and provide young dancers and choreographers the opportunity to train and present their new works.

== Occupancy ==
Loehmann's opened a 27,000 square feet (2,500 m^{2}) retail store on the first two floors on October 12, 2007. This location is part of the transformation of State Street to a retail and student-housing mecca, and further solidifies the revitalization of Randolph Street's theatre district. Loehmann's filed for bankruptcy November 16, 2010 and closed the State Street location January 29, 2011, after less than 4 years in operation.

Walgreens, which had occupied the property from 1926 until 2005, announced that it would take over the Loehmann's space and operate a two-level drugstore, opening in 2012. The location was developed as a two-story 27,350-square-foot (2,541 m^{2}) flagship location that was unveiled with dignitaries such as Chicago Mayor Rahm Emanuel and Illinois Governor Pat Quinn on January 12, 2012, selling a range of amenities far beyond that of a typical pharmacy. Some of the features included a cigar humidor, international newsstand, made-to-order smoothies, self-serve frozen yogurt, sushi and juice bars, a barista, over 700 fine wines, and manicure stations. The Walgreens investment was part of a business strategy to combat governmentally-induced declining pharmacy margins.

== School zoning ==
Residents of the building are zoned to Chicago Public Schools. Residents are zoned to South Loop K-8 and Phillips Academy High School.
