= Midge Mackenzie =

British writer and filmmaker (1938–2004)

Margaret Rose "Midge" MacKenzie, (6 March 1938 – 28 January 2004) was a London-born writer and filmmaker who first become known for producing Robert Joffrey's multimedia ballet Astarte with the Joffrey Ballet, and Women Talking, a documentary with interviews of Kate Millett, Betty Friedan and other leading figures in the US women's liberation movement.

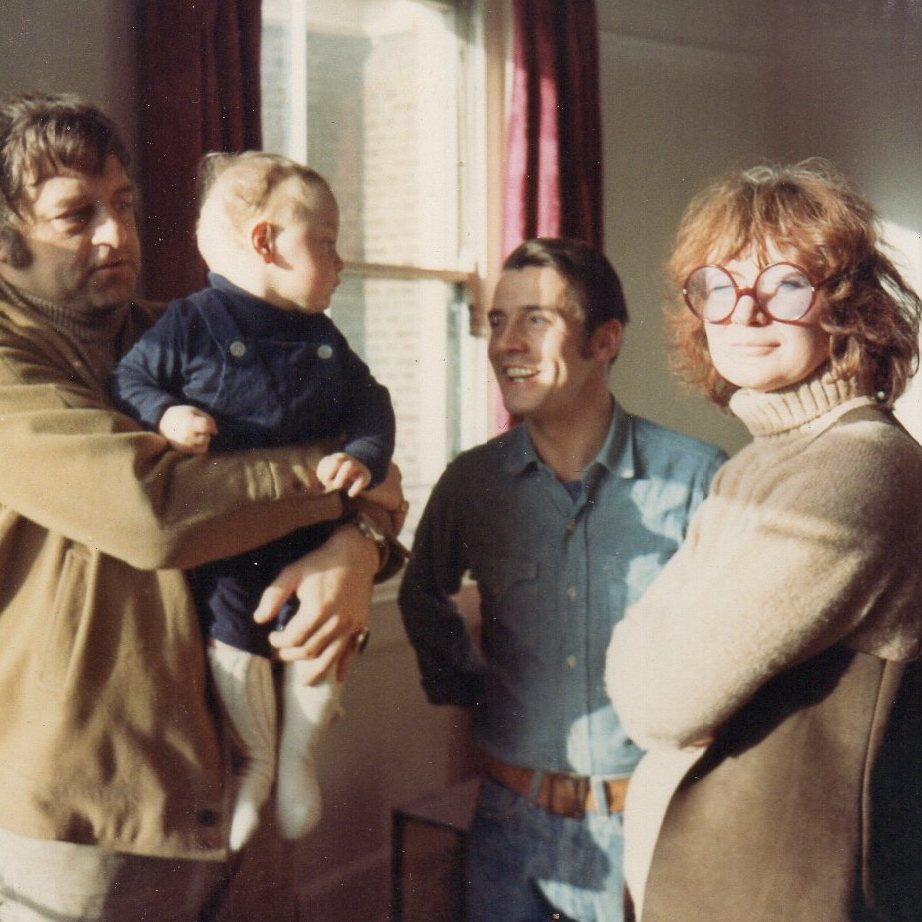
From left: Frank / Bunny / (Co-host Michael Browne) / Mackenzie in 1967

== Biography ==
After reading the work of psychoanalyst Alice Miller, MacKenzie started exploring the meaning of her childhood and from this came Prisoners of Childhood (1991), in which actors brought out themes of pain and damage from early years. She made the wonderful I Stand Here Ironing (1980) based on Tillie Olsen stories, and later a trilogy of films looking at remote communities in Ireland, Scotland and Wales. Saving Faces documented the patients whose faces had been reconstructed by surgeon Ian Hutchison, who is the chief executive of the charity Saving Faces. Hutchison recalls, "She followed us around absolutely silently and made a film that said so much."

After many years refusing her request to interview him about his World War Two documentaries, Hollywood film director John Huston finally agreed to MacKenzie interviewing him at his home in Mexico, which became John Huston War Stories, released in 1999, more than a decade after his death.

MacKenzie organised and script edited Shoulder to Shoulder (1974), a 6-part drama series for the BBC recounting the struggle of the suffragettes.

MacKenzie had a severely disabled son, Bunny, (real name Luke) by Frank Cvitanovich, born in 1967 who died, aged 11, in 1978. With Cvitanovich, she made a documentary about him called Bunny.

She died on 28 January 2004 and was buried on the eastern side of Highgate Cemetery

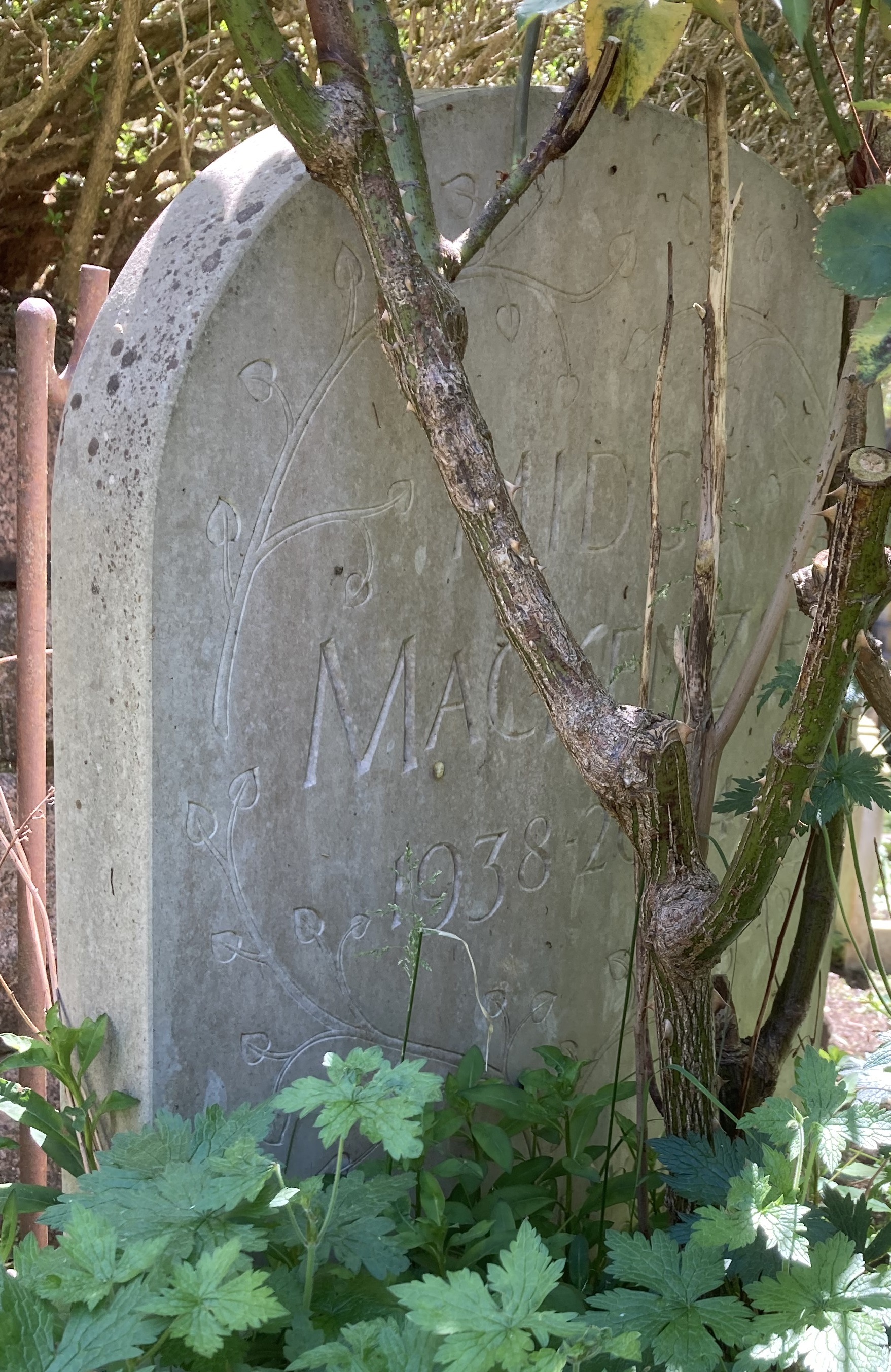
Grave of Midge MacKenzie in Highgate Cemetery
