= Astarte (ballet) =

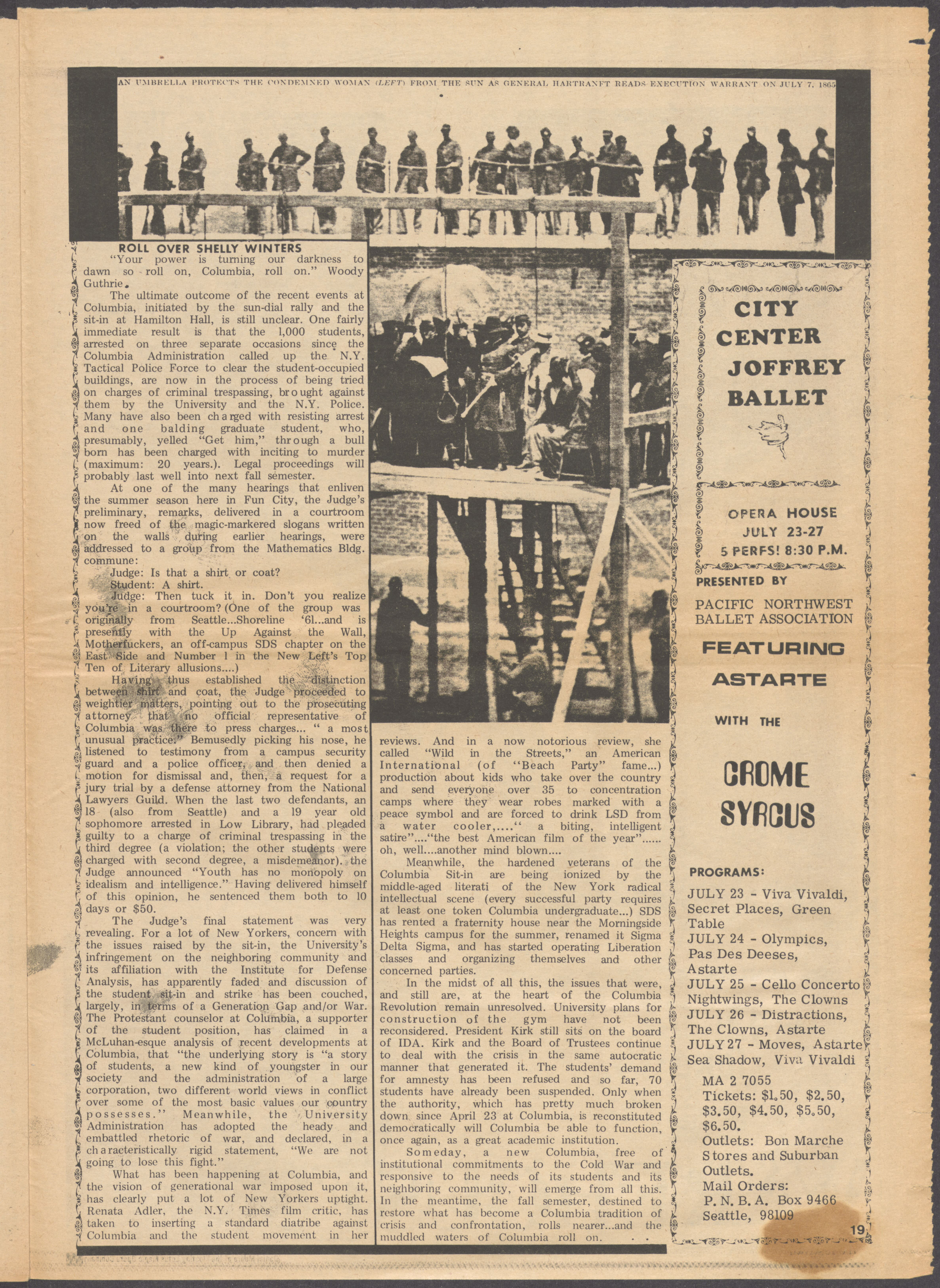
On the right, an advertisement for Astarte in Helix on Jul. 18, 1968

Astarte, choreographed by Robert Joffrey, was the first live, multi-media ballet with a specially commissioned rock music score composed and performed by Crome Syrcus. It received its world premier on September 20, 1967, and was performed by the Joffrey Ballet in New York City at the City Center Theater. It was produced by Midge Mackenzie, with sets and lighting design by Thomas Skelton, costumes by Hugh Sherrer, and film created and photographed by Gardner Compton.

Astarte made the cover of Time magazine in March 1968.
