= Sigurd Leeder =

German dancer and choreographer (1902–1981)

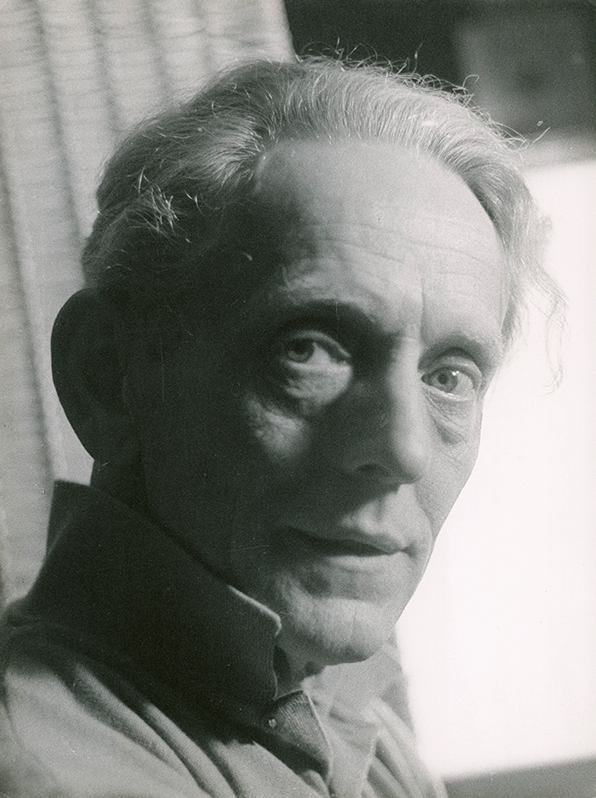

Sigurd Leeder (born Carl Eduard Wilhelm Leder; 14 August 1902 – 20 June 1981) was a German dancer, choreographer and dance education theorist.

== Life ==
He was born in Hamburg on 14 August 1902, the son of Carl Eduard Gottfried Leder, lithographer, and Martha Auguste Anna Henriette Friedrich. He died in Herisau, on 20 June 1981, aged 78. He developed a method of teaching expressive dance and contributed, with Albrecht Knust, to the development and dissemination of labanotation, which pioneered the written language of symbols to record and represent modern dance.

== Career ==
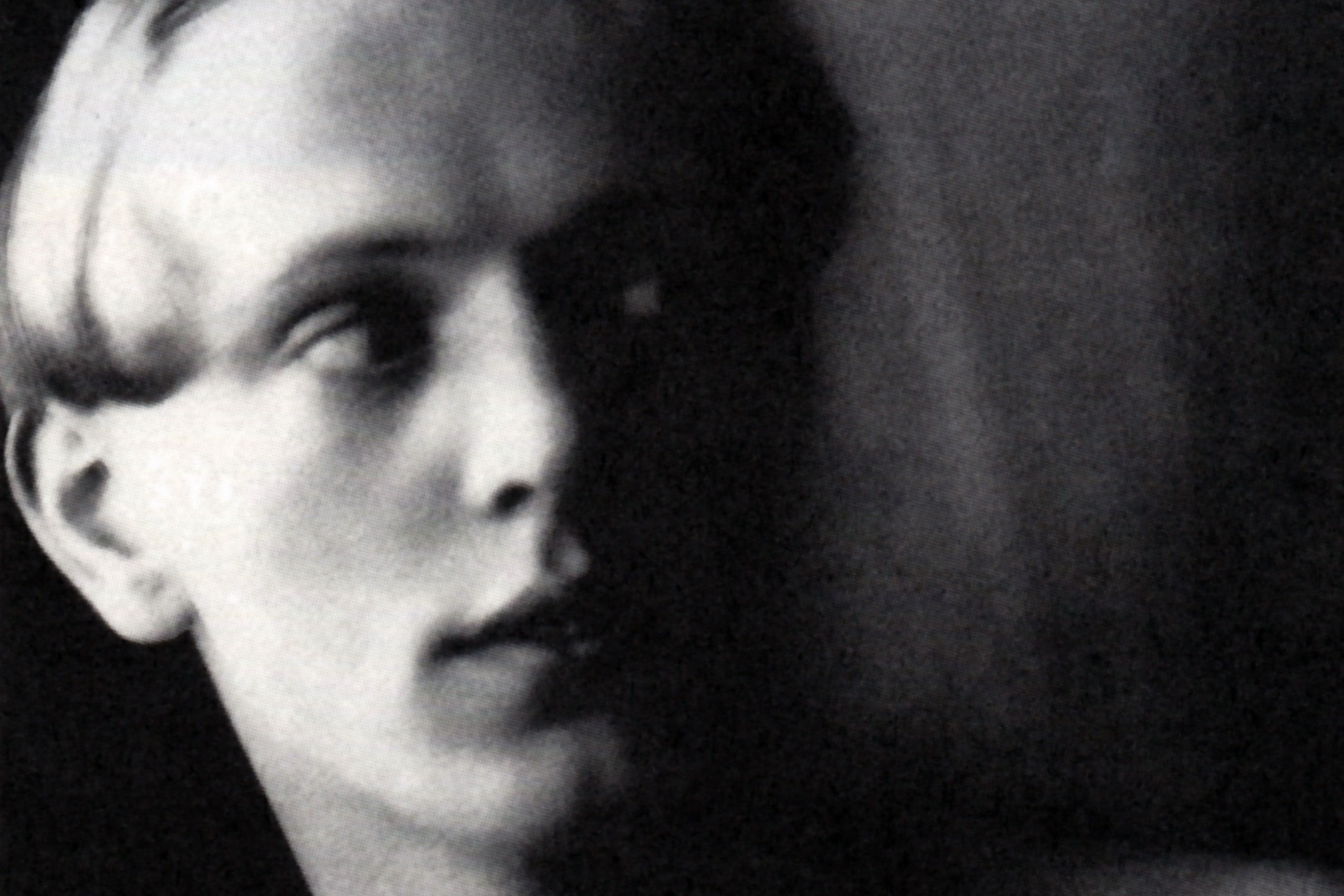

After studying graphic design in Hamburg for two and a half years, he studied dance at the artists' colony Monte Verità in Ascona with Klara Norden, a pupil of Rudolf Laban and Mary Wigman. In 1920, he devised his first solo choreography, Tanz ohne Musik, and performed it at the Curiohaus in Hamburg. He then joined Hamburger Kammerspiele under the leadership of Erich Ziegel that same year. Then, in 1923, he toured with the Munich Tanzgruppe directed by Jutta von Collande.

Two encounters shaped his future career – with Rudolf Laban in 1923, and then with Kurt Jooss in 1924. He met the latter while he was a dancer at the Stadttheater in Münster under the joint direction of Hans Niedecken-Gebhard and Rudolf Schulz-Dornburg. A close collaboration between Leeder and Jooss followed, lasting twenty-three years. In 1926, he was given a teaching and leadership commission at the Westfälische Akademie für Bewegung, Sprache und Musik in Münster. The following year, with Kurt Jooss, he founded the Neue Tanzbühne at the Münster Theater, which employed Fritz Cohen as a pianist, Aino Siimola – future wife of Jooss – as a dancer, and Hein Heckroth as stage and costume designer. He also became a professor at the newly established Folkwangschule in Essen. He traveled with Jooss to study classical dance in Paris and Vienna. Their collaborative piece Zwei Tänzer became an emblematic work.

In 1928, he participated in the II Dancers Congress in Essen, with Kurt Jooss, Dussia Bereska, Fritz Klingenberg and Rudolf Laban, where kinetography – subsequently known as Labanotation – was introduced by Laban himself. In 1933, he taught Ida Rubinstein's Persephone company in Paris, where he met Dorothy and Leonard Elmhirst, soon-to-be patrons, who invited him, Jooss and their dancers to England in early 1934, following rising Nazi oppression. This was the foundation of the Jooss-Leeder School of Dance at Dartington Hall in Devon. He developed his method of teaching based on the study of eukinetics and choreutics – which had begun in Essen – the various dynamics of movement and the coordination of spatiality in and around the body.

As a result of restrictive measures during the early part of the Second World War, he spent a few months in an internment camp, then moved to Cambridge in 1940, where he reformed the Jooss-Leeder Dance Studio with Kurt Jooss. The year 1947 marks the end of their collaboration, when he moved to London and set up his own school with the Studio Group as his own company. On 17 July, he changed his name to Sigurd Leeder. In addition to teaching in London, he regularly participated in summer courses in Switzerland, notably alongside his peers in modern dance, including Mary Wigman, Rosalia Chladek and Harald Kreutzberg.

Among his students in London at this time were Birgit Cullberg, the founder of the Ballets Cullberg in Sweden, and Grete Müller who would become his later collaborator. As a teacher, he trained not only dancers but also future teachers, such as Simone Michelle and June Kemp, who took over the direction of the London school when he left for Chile to take up an appointment to direct the University of Chile's dance department from 1959 to 1964. In 1965, he was invited by Grete Müller to take over the direction of the school which she had opened in Herisau after her training at the school in London. He taught here until his death in 1981. In 1979, he headed the International Council of Kinetography Laban (ICKL), the international congress. They dedicated themselves to the development of the signs and language of Laban notation, the transcription of choreographies and the writing of movement studies for teaching.

== Choreographies (non exhaustive list) ==
=== Dancer ===
- Tanz ohne Musik (1920)
- Tanzabend (1922)
- Maskentanz (1924)
- Nachtstück (1926)
- Zwei Tänzer (1924–1926) with Kurt Jooss
- Der grüne Tisch (1932) with Ballets Jooss
- Der grosse Stadt (1932 et 1937) with Ballets Jooss
- Die Gaukelei (1930) with Ballets Jooss
- Der gläubige Landmann (1933)
- Sailor's fancy (1943)
- Pandora (1944)

=== Choreographer ===
- Tanz ohne Musik (1920)
- Nachtstück (1926)
- Donna Clara (1937)
- Bolero, 1940 (et reprise en 1974)
- Figura Tragica (1952)
- Danse Macabre (1953)
- Tender Meeting (1955)
- Gebannte Flucht (1966)
- Von fremder Art (1970–1972)
- Die Pforte (1977)

== Bibliography ==
- Müller, Grete (2001). Sigurd Leeder, Tänzer, Pädagoge und Choreograf. Leben und Werk. Herisau: Appenzeller Medienhaus. ISBN 978-0-307-42542-3.
- Stöckemann, Patricia (2001). Etwas ganz Neues muß nun entstehen. Kurt Jooss und das Tanztheater. Munich: K. Kieser. ISBN 978-0-307-42542-3.
