= Billboards (ballet) =

- Poster for Billboards
- Music: Prince
- Productions: University of Iowa (January 1993); Dorothy Chandler Pavilion, Los Angeles (July 1993); Brooklyn Academy of Music (November 1993)

Billboards is a ballet commissioned by Gerald Arpino for the Joffrey Ballet featuring the works of Prince. The premiere was on Wednesday, January 27, 1993, at Hancher Auditorium, University of Iowa, Iowa City.

No new music was used, although Prince contributed a special extended ten-minute orchestrated version of "Thunder" from the Diamonds and Pearls album. A video of the performance was released on VHS in February 1994, and on Laserdisc format.

== Acts ==
=== I: Sometimes It Snows in April ===
Choreographed by Laura Dean.

- "Sometimes It Snows in April"
- "Trust" / "Baby I'm a Star"

=== II: Thunder ===
Choreographed by Charles Moulton.

- "Thunder"
- "Purple Rain"

=== III: Slide ===
Choreographed by Margo Sappington.

- "Computer Blue"
- "I Wanna Melt with U"
- "The Beautiful Ones"
- "Release It" (by The Time)/ "Computer Blue" (Reprise)

=== IV: Willing & Able ===
Choreographed by Peter Pucci.

- "For You"
- "The Question of U"
- "It"
- "Willing and Able" / "Gett Off"
