= Bill Barbini =

American musician

William Barbini is an American violin player. He graduated from the Juilliard School in 1970.

He began his career as a member of the New York Philharmonic orchestra and served as concertmaster for the Joffrey Ballet. During his time in New York he could often be heard in chamber music ensembles, and giving recitals as a soloist with the Norwalk Festival Orchestra.

Barbini became concertmaster of the Sacramento Symphony in 1983 joining the faculty of the Sacramento State Music Department in 1984. He is the music director of the Chamber Music Society of Sacramento and leader of the Ariel Quartet.
