= The Company (film) =

2003 film by Robert Altman

- Theatrical release poster
- Directed by: Robert Altman
- Screenplay by: Barbara Turner
- Story by: Barbara Turner; Neve Campbell
- Produced by: Robert Altman; Joshua Astrachan; Neve Campbell; Pamela Koffler; David Levy; Christine Vachon
- Starring: Neve Campbell; Malcolm McDowell; James Franco
- Cinematography: Andrew Dunn
- Edited by: Geraldine Peroni
- Music by: Van Dyke Parks
- Production companies: CP Medien; Killer Films
- Distributed by: Sony Pictures Classics (United States); Capitol Films (Overseas)
- Release date: December 26, 2003
- Running time: 112 minutes
- Country: United States
- Language: English
- Budget: $15 million
- Box office: $6.4 million

The Company is a 2003 American drama film directed by Robert Altman with a screenplay by Barbara Turner from a story by Turner and star and co-producer Neve Campbell. The film also stars Malcolm McDowell and James Franco, and is set in the company of the Joffrey Ballet.

== Plot ==
Without focusing on a single main character, the film depicts a season of rehearsals and performances at the Joffrey Ballet. Its artistic director is the warm yet demanding former dancer Alberto Antonelli, who steadily guides the company through the rigors of training, injuries, scheduling challenges, financial difficulties, and conflicts between dancers and choreographers. As the film begins, Antonelli has his eye on a talented dancer, Loretta 'Ry' Ryan, and chooses to grant her more and more prominent roles within the Ballet's performances in spite of her lack of cohesion with some of its members (one dancer requests to be removed from a number after his relationship with Ry ends acrimoniously).

Like many of the company's less senior members, Ry needs to work a second job. Against her mother's protests, she waitresses at a trendy bar. Ry meets Josh Williams, a young chef whose slowly ascending position in a restaurant's kitchen mirrors her own journey to stardom. The two begin a happy relationship after Josh sees Ry seductively playing pool to Elvis Costello's recording of "My Funny Valentine", a song which recurs throughout the movie.

One of the central threads of the film is the Joffrey Ballet's preparations to stage a new work by Robert Desrosiers based on Hindu mythology. (The performance depicted is Blue Snake, which Desrosiers had actually choreographed in 1989 with the National Ballet of Canada). Antonelli and Desrosiers quickly pick Ry to be the featured female dancer in the work after she impresses them by dancing Lar Lubovitch's My Funny Valentine outside during a thunderstorm. The work proves difficult to stage, with another dancer suffering a career-ending injury to her Achilles tendon in rehearsals; its demands also strain Ry's personal life, at one point causing her to miss a complicated dinner made for her by Josh. In between the preparations for Blue Snake, the company stages and rehearses many other pieces, including a dance on a swing set to Julee Cruise's "The World Spins". To release tension, many of the dancers host an impromptu "roast night" dance on Christmas Eve, in which Antonelli and Desrosiers' personalities are lampooned.

Blue Snake eventually premieres at the Kennedy Center. During the performance, Ry injures her arm at the end of a solo section, forcing Desrosiers to improvise until another dancer can be fitted into her elaborate costume. The work is still a resounding success. Josh, who has been similarly injured in a kitchen accident, sneaks onto the stage during bows to congratulate Ry. They celebrate as the main curtain descends.

== Cast ==
- Neve Campbell as Loretta 'Ry' Ryan
- Malcolm McDowell as Alberto Antonelli
- James Franco as Josh Williams
- Barbara Robertson as Harriet
- William Dick as Edouard
- Susie Cusack as Susie
- Marilyn Dodds Frank as Ryan's mother
- John Lordan as Ryan's father
- Lar Lubovitch as himself
- Robert Desrosiers as himself

The part of Alberto Antonelli was reportedly inspired by the real life dancer and choreographer Gerald Arpino.

== Production ==
=== Development ===
The Company was an idea of Campbell's for a long time—she began her career as a ballet dancer, having been a student at Canada's National Ballet School. Altman was initially reluctant to direct the film, reportedly remarking, "Barbara, I read your script and I don't get it. I don't understand. I don't know what it is. I'm just the wrong guy for this." The director eventually relented, and The Company turned out to be his penultimate film. Neve Campbell and James Franco prepared for their roles as restaurant workers by training under Mickaël Blais, the chef of Marche, an upscale bistro in Chicago.

=== Dance lighting ===
Dance lighting for the Joffrey Ballet portions was composed by the dance lighting designer Kevin Dreyer.

=== Pieces in the film ===
Excerpts of the following dance pieces are included in the film:

- Alwin Nikolais's "Tensile Involvement" (opening piece, with ensemble bound by elastic)
- Gerald Arpino's "Light Rain", "Suite Saint-Saëns", and "Trinity"
- Moses Pendleton's "White Widow" (dance with the swing)
- Robert Desrosiers's "The Blue Snake"
- Arthur Saint-Leon's "La Vivandière" (excerpt from Pas de Six)
- Lar Lubovitch's "My Funny Valentine" (pas de deux; the performance in the thunderstorm)
- Laura Dean's "Creative Force" (Campbell's flashback; the excerpt for 10 dancers in red costumes)

== Reception ==
=== Box office ===
The Company was given a limited release on December 25, 2003, earning $93,776 in eleven theaters over its opening weekend. The film ultimately grossed $2,283,914 in North America and $4,117,776 in foreign markets, bringing its worldwide box office total to $6,401,690—well below its estimated $15 million budget.

=== Critical response ===
On Rotten Tomatoes the film has a 72% rating based on reviews from 131 critics. The site's consensus states: "Its deliberately unfocused narrative may frustrate some viewers, but The Company finds Altman gracefully applying his distinctive eye to the world of dance." On Metacritic it has a score of 73% based on reviews from 32 critics, indicating "generally favorable reviews".

Roger Ebert of the Chicago Sun-Times praised the film, awarding it 3 1/2 stars out of four, and positively compared Campbell's performance to Charlize Theron's in the film Monster (2003), which won the Academy Award for Best Actress. Ed Gonzalez of Slant Magazine similarly declared it the best movie of 2003. Elvis Mitchell of The New York Times called the film "enjoyably lithe and droll" and attributed a "great deal of the film's appeal" to McDowell's performance, while opining that the film "doesn't stick with you as a whole."
