= Shoulder to Shoulder =

- Title card
- Created by: Midge Mackenzie; Verity Lambert; Georgia Brown
- Directed by: Waris Hussein; Moira Armstrong
- Starring: Siân Phillips; Angela Down; Patricia Quinn; Georgia Brown; Judy Parfitt; Sheila Ballantine; Maureen Pryor
- Theme music composer: Ethel Smyth
- Opening theme: "The March of the Women"
- Composer: Stanley Myers
- Country of origin: United Kingdom
- Original language: English
- No. of episodes: 6

Production
- Producer: Verity Lambert
- Running time: 75 minutes

Original release
- Network: BBC2
- Release: 3 April – 8 May 1974

Shoulder to Shoulder is a 1974 BBC television serial relating the history of the women's suffrage movement, created by script editor Midge Mackenzie, producer Verity Lambert and actor Georgia Brown. It was broadcast on BBC2 between 3 April and 8 May 1974.

== Development ==
The drama series grew out of discussions between Mackenzie and the actress and singer Georgia Brown, who was dissatisfied at the lack of decent roles for women in TV drama. Brown enlisted the producer Verity Lambert in the project she and Mackenzie were devising to dramatise the struggle for women's suffrage, and the three women presented the idea to the BBC, which gave approval for the series. Originally they had hoped to use only female scriptwriters but this proved impracticable. Male writers were used and the three female originators of the project later said they needed to remove from their scripts a number of 'innuendoes, misconceptions and untruths' indicative of what Georgia Brown termed "the male point of view".

The series, directed by Waris Hussein and Moira Armstrong, dramatised the fight for the right to vote for British women. It covered the period from the 1890s to 1919 and followed the suffrage movement as it was influenced by the Pankhursts: Richard, Emmeline, Christabel and Sylvia, and Annie Kenney. The series was written by Douglas Livingstone, Alan Plater, Ken Taylor and Hugh Whitemore. The series was made in association with Warner Bros. Television. The designers were Susan Spence, Evan Hercules and Eileen Diss; costumes were by Joan Ellacott. Emmeline Pankhurst was played by Sian Phillips; her daughters Christabel and Sylvia by Patricia Quinn and Angela Down. Michael Gough played Emmeline's husband, Dr Richard Pankhurst. Georgia Brown played Annie Kenney, a mill worker who joined the cause and eventually became a dynamic speaker for the movement. Lady Constance Lytton, an upper class activist for women's suffrage who underwent force feeding in prison, was played by Judy Parfitt. Sally Miles played Flora Drummond; Sheila Allen, Emmeline Pethick-Lawrence. Fulton Mackay played the socialist leader Keir Hardie, Robert Hardy was Asquith and Bob Hoskins played Jack Dunn.

== Repeat broadcast ==
After an extensive period of critical neglect, Shoulder to Shoulder was rebroadcast on BBC Four in April 2024 to mark both its 50th anniversary and the 90th birthday of Phillips, as well as being added to BBC iPlayer. A retrospective conversation between Phillips, Hussein and Armstrong was also shown.

== Tie-in book ==
The book Shoulder to Shoulder documents the lives and works of some of Britain's leading suffragettes. It includes many excerpts from their speeches, diaries, letters, memoirs, other writings and various newspaper cuttings, photographs, and cartoons.

== See also ==
- Iron Jawed Angels (2004 film)
- Suffragette (2015 film)
- Suffs (2022 musical)
