= The Green Table =

1932 ballet by Kurt Joos

The Green Table is a ballet by the German choreographer Kurt Jooss. His most popular work, it depicts the futility of peace negotiations of the 1930s. It was the first work to be fully notated using kinetography Laban (Labanotation). It is in the repertoire of ballet companies worldwide, where it has been staged by Jooss himself. When he died in 1979, his daughter Anna Markard took over stagings of the work. With her death in 2010, Former Dutch National Ballet principal Jeanette Vondersaar assumed those responsibilities.

Choreography	Kurt Jooss
Music	Fritz Cohen
Design	Hein Heckroth
Libretto	Kurt Jooss
Lighting Design	Hermann Mankard
First Production	Folkwang Tanzbuhne, "Concours international de chorégraphie en souvenir de Jean Borlin," organized by the Archives Internationales de la Danse, Théâtre des Champs-Élysées, Paris, 3 July 1932
Principal Dancers	Kurt Jooss (Death), Karl Bergeest (The Profiteer), Ernst Uthoff (The Standard Bearer), Elsa Kahl (Woman), Lisa Czobel (Young Girl)
Other Productions	Jooss Ballet (new name of the Folkwang Tanzbuhne), restaged by Jooss, New York, 31 October 1933; restaged Paris, July 1946; City Center Joffrey Ballet (restaged Jooss), New York, 9 March 1967; Northern Dance Theatre (staged Anna Markard), Manchester, 30 May 1973; Oakland Ballet (restaged by daughter Anna Markard) 1984; Joffrey Ballet, 2007 with lighting reconstructed by Kevin Dreyer.

== History ==
The Green Table was created in 1932 for the "Concours international de chorégraphie" in Paris, in which Jooss had been invited to participate. The originality of the piece won him the first prize and marked an important step in his career. Choreographed between two great conflicts, the work is a sort of generic war, a set of circumstances that produce the same result no matter where or when they are played out. So Death bears the combined iconographic attributes.

In 1932, looking out through the thickening hedges of Nazism, Jooss takes a less visionary path. The Green Table is concerned neither with the individual's struggles and redemption, nor with working out a nobler fate for mankind. Jooss dramatizes the way destructive impulses are released and shows us the consequences. His moral position is unimpeachable and he drives home his lesson in a series of stark images. Each scene works a variation on the same theme, like the 41 woodcuts in Hans Holbein's The Dance of Death. The idea is that Death becomes everyone's partner, effectively seducing them into his dance on the same terms by which they lived their lives. No decisive action, change, or resolution is suggested, and in framing the "Dance of Death" with the stalemated parentheses of a diplomatic conference, Jooss seems to say none can be expected. The expressionists found the Dance of Death.

Through archetypal characters Jooss revisualizes human life as a function of a larger cosmology, an enduring and spiritual sphere where perhaps even war and death can be seen in a more comprehensible scale. Undiluted essences of natural behavior, these characters are stripped of temporality and individual preference. Today, even as we feel detached from their obvious artificiality, we recognize ourselves in them, in some epic form. People will still be able to understand them in a hundred years.

Jooss left Essen, where since 1927 he had directed the Folkwangschule's dance department and experimental dance group and, since 1930, the ballet company of the Opera as well. He founded the Ballet Jooss, a private company which toured Europe and performed his dances, including The Green Table.

In 1971, Joffrey principal dancer Christian Holder was trained by Jooss for a revival of The Green Table, and when Jooss died in 1979, the Joffrey Ballet held an impromptu performance with Holder dancing the role of "Death".

== Plot outline ==
Lasting about 30 minutes and subtitled "A dance of death in eight scenes," The Green Table is a commentary on the futility of war and the horrors it causes. It opens with a group of diplomats (the Gentlemen in Black, portrayed by the other characters in the piece, with the exception of Death) having a discussion around a rectangular table covered with a green cloth. They end up pulling guns from their pockets and shooting in the air, thus symbolizing the declaration of war.
The next six scenes portray different aspects of wartime: the separation from loved ones in The Farewells, war itself in The Battle and The Partisan, loneliness and misery in The Refugees, the emotional void and the atmosphere of forced entertainment in The Brothel and, finally, the psychologically beaten and wounded survivors in The Aftermath. The ballet then ends as it began, with the "Gentlemen in Black" around the green table.

Throughout these episodes the figure of Death is triumphant, portrayed as a skeleton moving in a forceful and robot-like way, relentlessly claiming its victims. The dance ends with a repeat of the opening scene, a device the choreographer uses to show his mistrust in the talks of the diplomats; completely indifferent to the ravages of war, they continue their hypocritical negotiations.

== Analysis ==
The inspiration for the ballet, originally conceived as a solo, was provided by the medieval Lubecker Totentanz, a sequence of pictures portraying different types of people dancing with Death. Jooss gave it a contemporary setting and added the political content, which reflected his and many artists' concerns during Germany's Weimar Republic.

He then worked closely with the designer Hein Heckroth and the composer Frederick Cohen to build the piece. Jooss, in fact, advocated a form of dance-theatre in which the choreography is dramatic and develops from a libretto (often his own). Choreographer, composer, and designer combine their efforts to produce a coherent work in which all the elements, in harmony with each other, convey the feelings and ideas more powerfully. This concept of a unified work of art, previously theorized by Richard Wagner and, in the 18th century, by Jean-Georges Noverre, was popular among German artists in the early 20th century. Examples are found in the visual arts, for instance in the work of George Grosz and the Herzfelde brothers, or in the theatre of Erwin Piscator and his dramaturgical collective.

The Green Table reflects a concern for social issues and the problems of that era (shared by many artists contemporary with Jooss) such as political corruption and militaristic policies. Its style, with its cutting irony, caricature, and boldness of language, has much in common with Expressionism, which flourished in the first decade of the 20th century. The cynical structure of the dance, for example, is a formal expression of this dry humour: the diplomats repeat their routine with total indifference to the real consequences of their decisions. The seriousness of their discussion is negated by the music that Jooss chose to accompany this scene: a playful tango. He also dressed the characters in masks, which gave them a grotesque look, and created movements that are exaggerations of naturalistic movement, such as gesticulating while talking, or nervously pacing up and down while thinking.

The costumes and props were chosen for their symbolic qualities: a flag for the hopeful soldier, a red dress coupled with a white scarf for the partisan, or the skeleton-like costume of Death. Jooss mastered the visual outlook of his compositions with skill; again the scene of the Gentlemen in Black provides an example of how the choreographer directed the audience to focus on a particular point of interest, which may be a dancer located on a higher plane than the rest of the group, or someone keeping still while everybody else is moving (or vice versa), or simply a convergence of the compositional lines.

His use of space for expressive purposes, as well as the foundation of his technique, stemmed from his formative training as Rudolf Laban's student and assistant. Together they explored the interrelation between space and the body, with its various movement qualities reflecting different mental states and feelings. Jooss integrated Laban's findings and his free-style approach to dancing with the discipline of classical ballet training. The result was a new technique that emphasizes the use of the body as an expressive whole. This technique was to be absorbed and further developed by Jooss' students, among whom were Birgit Cullberg and Pina Bausch.

The Green Table is a mature example of this technique. It uses elements of classical ballet, such as turn-out, demi-pointe, extensions, turns, arabesques, and other ballet steps. However, there is no pointe work or any other feature that could suggest virtuoso display. The gracefulness, elegance, ethereal quality, and other affectations of classical ballet are eliminated. As with the choreography of Antony Tudor, every step is used, not for its formal look, but for its intrinsic expressive value, and the meaning it conveys is often reinforced by the position of the hands: rather than the relaxed wrists of ballet, Jooss uses stretched palms, fists, reaching hands, and so on. The focus of the dancers also varies, shifting towards the centre of drama, rather than being primarily towards the audience, as in ballet.

The resulting style, called by Jooss "Essentialism," tries to capture the essence of each movement or pose, its inner motivation. Death, for instance, moves with sharp, direct, strong, and angular movements, cutting through space, advancing or pacing with clockwork regularity. In contrast is the style of the Profiteer: he has a swift and agile way of moving, his back usually curved, his cunning nature further accentuated by the indirectness of his focus and his multi-directional spatial patterns. Such elements combine to make The Green Table a truly innovative work and the depth and universality of its humanistic content give it a timeless and meaningful quality.

=== Allusions to the Danse Macabre (Dance of Death) ===
Along with other German choreographers of the early 20th Century such as Mary Wigman, Valeska Gert, and Anita Berber, choreographer Kurt Jooss explored concepts relating to death. However, unlike Wigman, Gert, and Berber, Kurt Jooss directly employs the imagery of the processions found in traditional paintings depicting this "Dance of Death" or "Danse Macabre".

As a result of the various famines, lengthy wars, and epidemics (The Black Plague) of the fourteenth century, the Dance of Death represented a collective Western (European) ideal of the inescapable nature of Death's dance with humans of any status. In many of the paintings and texts referencing the Dance of Death, the dance is depicted and referenced as some kind of linear procession - a line of people. With a personification of Death, a skeleton, in front, they lead the humans, dead, arms linked with one another, in some direction, mimicking a type of social dance.

In "The Aftermath", the last scene of Jooss' The Green Table follows six preceding scenes that illustrate war and its effects on archetypal humans/characters. After these characters - the soldiers, the loved ones, an escort, etc. - are fatally affected by the deadly effects of war, they appear and dance in a linear formation and resemble the processional nature of "The Dance of Death". In fact, Jooss referred to The Green Table as, ''Totentanz," a term that translates to "Dance of the Dead"; furthermore, the German choreographer's The Green Table took inspiration from a 15th century painted mural that employed the same visualization of humans in a processional dance with Death.

The traditional concept and subsequent depictions of "The Dance of Death" arise from historical mass deaths and were employed in order to evoke a sense of Death's inevitability, of human mortality to hunger, violence, and illness. Jooss, although he remains consistent with the themes of Death's inevitability and human mortality, expands upon the ideals already instilled in the traditional concepts of the Dance of Death in a manner that presents a lens of antiwar politics.

Following "The Farewells", "The Battle", "The Partisan", "The Refugees, and "The Brothel", the physical manifestation of the Death's foreboding figure marches on stage to initiate the final scene: "The Aftermath". As he marches on stage, he is followed by the aforementioned procession of war's victims. As Death holds a blue-stained white flag above their heads, they slowly fall to the ground as Death's choreographic timing demands. This scene solidifies The Green Table as one of the first modern political choreographic pieces when using the dramatic deaths of various types of characters - humans - to represent the inevitability of Death during war among various everyday humans while the caricatured Politicians continue their repetitive and futile deliberations.

Kurt Jooss, influenced by the Dance of Death's visual component - the procession of the dead, expanded upon the traditional ideals of Death's inevitability and human mortality to create a choreographic commentary on the detrimental effects of war. Jooss's choreography claims that in war especially, Death's inevitability and human mortality are most apparent among various (all) humans, except for the Politicians who choose to start and end the war. They remain unharmed, nonchalant of, and separate from the procession of the dead.
