= Notre Dame Shakespeare Festival =

Theatre festival at the University of Notre Dame

The Notre Dame Shakespeare Festival (formerly Summer Shakespeare) at the University of Notre Dame is an annual festival that seeks to combine professional productions of the works of William Shakespeare with community engagement and educational programs. The Notre Dame Shakespeare Festival is a part of the University of Notre Dame's Shakespeare initiative entitled "Shakespeare at Notre Dame", a program that recognizes the centrality of the study of Shakespeare in humanistic pedagogy at the university. Its fifteenth season (summer of 2014) was known as the 15/150, also celebrating the 450th birthday of William Shakespeare, and the 150th anniversary of the first full production of Shakespeare at the university in 1864 (Records indicate the first performance of Shakespeare at the University of Notre Dame took place in 1847, a collection of scenes also from Henry IV). The anniversary season consisted of the Professional Company production of Henry IV (directed by Michael Goldberg), the Young Company performance of The Merry Wives of Windsor (directed by West Hyler), and the annual ShakeScenes shows featuring actors of all ages from South Bend and the surrounding community.

== History ==
The Notre Dame Shakespeare Festival, (the professional theatre in residence at the University of Notre Dame), is a direct outgrowth of an experimental course called "Shakespeare in Performance" created in 1989 by Dr. Paul Rathburn, NDSF's founder. The premise of this course was that Shakespeare's works are both theatrical scripts and literary texts and are illuminated best through work in both the theater and in the classroom. It began in the summer of 2000 with the program's inaugural production, The Taming of the Shrew, but has since evolved to include guest artists and productions, the ShakeScenes community program, and a Young Company production produced and staffed entirely by Notre Dame and Saint Mary's students. Following the 2005 production of Henry V, Dr. Paul Rathburn retired from his role as Producing Artistic Director. The company's Artistic Director from 2006 - 2012 was Jay Paul Skelton. The current Ryan Producing Artistic Director for the Notre Dame Shakespeare Festival is Grant Mudge. The resident lighting designer for the festival since its inception has been ND Associate Professor Kevin Dreyer.

== The professional company production ==
Arguably the centerpiece of the annual festival, the professional company production consists of a professionally mounted performance of one of the plays of William Shakespeare. The production is always directed and designed by theatrical professionals, typically from either the Chicago theatre world or the university's own faculty and staff. A number of professional actors are also employed, as well as Notre Dame and Saint Mary's students and South Bend community members.

== The Young Company ==
Beginning with 2003's production, the student actors and technicians in the professional company production were given the chance to perform in a production produced entirely by them (though directed by a senior company member). The roles in the Young Company performance are necessarily larger both on and offstage - the professional company's assistant to the technical director may become the Young Company technical director, while a student playing First Soldier may have a chance to play King Richard III. Although in the past Young Company performances have taken place on the same set used for the professional company performance, 2006 saw the introduction of "green shows", performances in which Young Company members traveled to local parks in South Bend and the surrounding community.

=== Past Young Company productions ===
- Shakespeare on Love, adapted by R. John Roberts, 2003
- Shakespeare on Comedy: A Vaudeville, adapted by R. John Roberts, 2004
- Falstaff's Dream, adapted by Susan Hart, 2005 (directed by Susan Hart)
- The Brothers Menaechmus, by Plautus, translated by Richard Pryor with further adaptation by Jay Paul Skelton, 2006, (directed by Jay Paul Skelton)
- The Learned Ladies, by Molière, directed by Kevin Asselin, 2007
- The Witch, by Thomas Middleton, directed by Kevin Asselin, 2008
- The Deceived or Gl'ingannati, by Accademia degli Intronati of Siena (translation by Ken Rea), directed by Kevin Asselin, 2009
- The Taming of the Shrew, by William Shakespeare, directed by Kevin Asselin, 2010
- As You Like It, by William Shakespeare, directed by Kevin Asselin, 2011
- A Midsummer Night's Dream, by William Shakespeare, directed by Kevin Asselin, 2012
- The Comedy of Errors, by William Shakespeare, directed by Kevin Asselin, 2013

== ShakeScenes ==
ShakeScenes is NDSF's community outreach program, employing local theatre troupes and schools to perform selected scenes from Shakespeare's works. The coordinating director for ShakeScenes from its inception until 2012 was Deborah Girasek-Chudzynski of South Bend's Stanley Clark School. In 2012, the baton was passed to Christy Burgess, the Shakespeare outreach program director at Notre Dame's Robinson Community Learning Center. Participants range in age from 7 to 70, and scene directors are usually educators from local grade schools, high schools, colleges, and directors of area civic theatres. These individuals cast and direct their respective scenes as well as facilitate costumes, props, and choreography. All members of the ShakeScenes company attend acting workshops taught by local and national theatre artists.

== Production history ==
Notre Dame Shakespeare Festival productions
Season	Company	Performance title	Performance dates	Cast	Crew	Location
2000	Professional Company	The Taming of the Shrew	August 2000	* R. John Roberts: Baptista Minola * Hollis McCarthy: Katherina Beth Gervain: Bianca * Thom Van Ermen: Petruchio * Mark McCarthy: Grumio * Frederic Stone: Gremio Christopher Beely: Hortensio/Officer Todd Dvorak: Lucentio Mike Kersey: Tranio John Area: Biondello Melissa Fosse-Dunne: Curtis * Scott Stambach: Pedant/Sugarsop Jenifer Rinner: Margary/Flower Seller Chris Sinnott: Nicholas/Waiter/Townsperson Lisa Marie Fabrega: Tailor/Waiter/Courtesan Liz Cenova: Joan/Servant Jerry Kline: Vincentio Stephanie Bickle: Widow	Director: Katherine Coulson	Notre Dame, IN
2000	Guest Performances	Will and I	August 2000	Michael York		Notre Dame, IN
2001	Professional Company	Much Ado About Nothing			Director: Katherine Coulson	Notre Dame, IN
2001	Guest Performances	The Lunatic, the Lover, and the Poet (by Brian Bedford)		Brian Bedford		Notre Dame, IN
2001	Guest Performances	All the World's a Stage		Brian Bedford and Claire Bloom		Notre Dame, IN
2002	Professional Company	The Tempest	July 23–28, 2002	Molly Malone Beeler: Spirit / Nymph Thomas Conner: Adrian / Mariner / Reaper Kerry Cotter: Ship Master *Matthew Quentin Fahey: Sebastian *Roger Forbes: Prospero Beth Gervain: Ceres / Spirit Matthew Holmes: Francisco / Mariner / Reaper *Richard Edward Long: Alonso *Hollis McCarthy: Iris *Mark McCarthy: Boatswain *Kathleen J. McClaine: Ariel *Suzanne Mignanelli: Miranda *Jim Mohr: Gonzalo *Matthew Penn: Antonio Drew Rausch: Ferdinand *R. John Roberts: Stephano *Robert Rutland: Trinculo Bethany Tovey: Spirit / Nymph Kat Walsh: Juno / Spirit *Martin Yurek: Caliban	Director: Gavin Cameron-Webb	Notre Dame, IN
2002	Guest Performances	Ah, Wilderness!		Guthrie Theatre		Notre Dame, IN
2003	Professional Company	A Midsummer Night's Dream	July 23-August 2, 2003	Elizabeth Bracken: Cobweb Novella Brooks-DeVita: First Fairy *McKinley Carter: Helena Thomas A. Conner: Francis Flute Terry Dawson: Egeus Jason Denuszek: Puck Mike Dolson: Robin Starveling Christine Flint: Fairy Elizabeth Grams: Peaseblossom *Susan Hart: Titania / Hippolyta Stephen Hoeplinger: Philostrate Mike Kersey: Demetrius Anhmarie Marshall: Moth T.J. McNally: Tom Snout Liz Melly: Mustardseed *Bradley Mott: Nick Bottom *Drew Rausch: Lysander * R. John Roberts: Peter Quince Megan E. Ryan: Hermia Justin Williams: Snug *Martin Yurek: Oberon / Theseus		Notre Dame, IN
2003	Student Company	Selected Scenes				Notre Dame, IN
2003	Guest Performances	The Stuff of Dreams		Guthrie Theatre		Notre Dame, IN
2004	Professional Company	Romeo and Juliet	July 21-August 1, 2004	Kevin Asselin: Tybalt Susan Baxter: Lady Montague Kerry Cotter: Lord Montague *Jason Denuszek: Benvolio Mike Dolson: Balthasar / Friar John Mike Federico: Paris *Maureen Gallagher: Nurse Adel Hanash: Abram *Susan Hart: Lady Capulet Katharine Kertez: Dancing Lady *Elizabeth Ledo: Juliet *John Lister: Lord Capulet T.J. McNally: Sampson Greg Melton: Prince Escalus *R. John Roberts: Friar Lawrence *Matt Schwader: Romeo Meghann Tabor: Dancing Lady David Tull: Gregory Justin Williams: Peter *Martin Yurek: Mercutio		Notre Dame, IN
2004	Student Company	An Evening With Shakespeare	July 24, 2004			Notre Dame, IN
2004	Young Company	ShakeScenes	July 17 & 18, 2004	South Bend Civic Theatre Youth (directed by Dana Vagg) South Bend Civic Theatre (directed by Judy Spigle) Clay High School (directed by Michelle Walters) Trinity School @ Greenlawn (dir: John Kurdelak) Mishawaka High School (dir: Ashley Bennett) John Adams High School (dir: Kerry Cotter) Culver Academies (dir: Richard Coven) Elkhart Central High School (dir: Alison Cordell) Elkhart Civic Theatre Youth (dir: Heather O'Connor Schoenherr) Stanley Clark School (dir: Deborah Girasek-Chudzynski) Bethel College (dir: Brock Fisher)		Notre Dame, IN
2004	Student Company	Shakespeare on Comedy: A Vaudeville	July 27, 2004			Notre Dame, IN
2004	Guest Performances	Othello	February 26–29, 2004	Guthrie Theatre		Notre Dame, IN
2005	Professional Company	Henry V	August 9–28, 2005	Steve Haggard: Falstaff's Boy *Matt Schwader: King Henry V *Robert Scogin: Duke of Exeter James Dolson: Duke of Gloucester / Lord Scroop / Alexander Court Brandon McGirr: Duke of Bedford Dan Kenney: Duke of York / Gower Greg Melton: Earl of Westmoreland / Jamy / Duke of Bourbon *John Lister: Archbishop of Canterbury / Pistol *Bradley Mott: Bishop of Ely / Sir John Falstaff / Charles VI *Sean Allan Krill: Earl of Cambridge / Lewis *Kevin Asselin: Sir Thomas Grey / Charles Delabreth Kerry Cotter: Sir Thomas Erpingham / Bardolph *Martin Yurek: Fluellen Ted Manier: Macmorris / Nym Ceschino Brooks de Vita: John Bates / Monsieur Le Fer Joseph Garlock: Michael Williams / Duke of Berri Molly Topper: Baggage Boy / Isabel *Susan Hart: Mistress Quickly / Alice David Tull: Duke of Orleans Cricket Slattery: Katherine T.J. McNally: Montjoy	Director: William Brown	Notre Dame, IN
2005	Young Company	ShakeScenes	August 6 & 7, 2005	Trinity School @ Greenlawn (directed by John Kurdelak) Stanley Clark School Summer Camp (directed by Elyse Chudzynski) Stanley Clark School (Deborah Girasek-Chudzynski) LaSalle Academy Shakespeare Club (dir: Marianne West & Cathy Welsh-Payne) John Adams High School (dir: Kerry Cotter) Troupe Du Jour (dir: Michelle Walters) Bethel College (dir: Brock Fisher) John Adams High School Alumni (dir: Douglas Lavanture) The Players (dir: Dana Vagg) South Bend Civic Theatre, Shakespeare Players (dir: Dana Vagg) Elkhart Civic Theatre Youth (dir: Heather O'Connor Schoenherr & Margo Brenner) Elkhard Central High School (dir: Alison Glenn) South Bend Civic Theatre (dir: Judy Spigle)	Coordinator: Deborah Girasek-Chudzynski	Notre Dame, IN
2005	Student Company	Falstaff's Dream	August 22 & 23, 2005	*Bradley Mott: Sir John Falstaff T.J. McNally: King Henry IV / Hastings James Dolson: Prince Hal Ceschino Brooks de Vita: Westmoreland / Douglas / Lord Chief-Justice David Tull: Worchester / Prince John / Morton Brandon McGirr: Northumberland / Blunt / York Crickey Slattery: Vernon / Rumour / Mistress Quickly Joseph Garlock: Hotspur / Pistol / Colevile Molly Topper: Lady Percy / Doll Tearsheet	Director: Susan Hart	Notre Dame, IN
2006	Professional Company	The Comedy of Errors	August 15–27, 2006	Victoria Abram-Copenhaver: Nun / Messenger *Kevin Asselin: Antipholus of Syracuse Joseph Garlock: Antipholus of Ephesus / Headsman Steve Haggard: Dromio of Syracuse Conor Woods: Dromio of Ephesus / Soldier *Elizabeth Ledo: Adriana Angela Aiea Sauer: Luciana Greg Melton: Solinus / Doctor Pinch *John Lister: Egeon *Maureen Gallagher: Abbess / Old Blind Woman *La Shawn Banks: Balthasar *Matthew Brumlow: Angelo Luke Cieslewicz: First Merchant Kerry Cotter: Second Merchant *Susan Shunk: Courtesan Kevin McCarthy: Officer Daniel Boughton: Soldier / Jailor Jennifer Betancourt: Courtesette Tashi Thomas: Courtesette Andrew Roth: Eunuch	Director: William Brown	Notre Dame, IN
2006	Young Company	The Brothers Menaechmus	July 16-August 12, 2006	Tashi Thomas: Prologa Victoria Abram-Copenhaver: Peniculus Joseph Garlock: Menaechmus I Angela Aiea Sauer: Erotium Margaret Robenalt: Cylindra Patrick Vassel: Menaechmus II Conor Woods: Messenio Jennifer Betancourt: Matrona Anna Mary Brenna: Ancilla Luke Cielewicz: Senex Kevin McCarthy: Medicus Andrew Roth: Decio Jacob Imm: Dulcio Cameron Rains: Ruffiano	Director: Jay Paul Skelton	St Patrick's Park, South Bend, IN Battell Park, Mishawaka, IN Dewey Cannon Park, Three Oaks, MI McNaughton Park, Elkhart, IN DeBartolo Performing Arts Center Quad, Notre Dame, IN
