= Robert Joffrey =

American ballet dancer and choreographer

- Joffrey in 1968
- Born: Anver Bey Abdullah Jaffa Khan; December 24, 1930 or 1928; Seattle, Washington, U.S.
- Died: March 25, 1988 (aged 57); New York City, U.S.
- Occupations: Choreographer, dancer, director
- Years active: 1950–1988
- Partner: Gerald Arpino
- Career
- Current group: Joffrey Ballet
- Website: arpinofoundation.org

Robert Joffrey (December 24, 1930 – March 25, 1988) was an American dancer, teacher, producer, choreographer, and co-founder of the Joffrey Ballet, known for his highly imaginative modern ballets. He was born Anver Bey Abdullah Jaffa Khan in Seattle, Washington to a Pashtun father from Afghanistan and a mother from Italy.

== Life and work ==
Joffrey began his dance training at nine years old in Seattle as a remedy for asthma under instructor Mary Anne Wells. He later studied ballet and modern dance in New York City, and made his debut in 1949 with the French choreographer Roland Petit and his Ballet de l'Opéra National de Paris. From 1950 to 1955, he taught at the New York High School for the Performing Arts, where he staged his earliest ballets. He founded the Joffrey Ballet School in New York City in 1953, where it remains as a separate organization from The Joffrey Academy of Dance in Chicago, which is the official school of the Joffrey Ballet Company.

As one of the first choreographers to have studied both modern dance and ballet, his choreography began to create the hybrid between modern and ballet that is very common today. His choreography blends the footwork, precision, and grace of classical ballet with the floorwork, upper body dexterity, and emotion of modern dance.

In 1954, he formed his own company, which premiered Le bal masqué (The Masked Ball, 1954; music by French composer Francis Poulenc) and Pierrot Lunaire (1955; music by Austrian composer Arnold Schoenberg). Joffrey's other works include Gamelan (1962) and Astarte (1967), which was set to rock music with special lighting and motion-picture effects. The pas de deux features a man who leaves his seat in the audience to climb on stage for an erotic dance with the "tattooed love goddess".

In 1956, six dancers drove around the country in a station wagon, performing twenty-three shows in eleven states. This was the first tour of the Robert Joffrey Studio Dancers, and they soon performed in India, the Middle East, the Soviet Union, and at the White House. In 1958 he choreographed the world premiere of Robert Kurka's The Good Soldier Schweik for the New York City Opera at Lincoln Center.

The Robert Joffrey Ballet took up residence at New York City Center in 1966 replacing New York City Ballet and changing its name to the City Center Joffrey Ballet. In 1982, it moved its principal activities to Los Angeles and in 1995 to Chicago. Noted for its experimental repertoire, the company was called the Joffrey Ballet of Chicago after its move but has since returned to being called simply the Joffrey Ballet. Besides Joffrey's works its repertoire includes many works by Gerald Arpino, Joffrey's long-time co-director, romantic partner, and eventually artistic director emeritus until his 2008 death, and ballets commissioned by Joffrey from new choreographers as well as works by such established choreographers as George Balanchine, Alvin Ailey and Twyla Tharp. He prided himself on creating a dynamic and diverse repertory, bringing modern dance choreographers such as Tharp and Ailey to ballet audiences for the first time, the restaging of classic Ballets Russes ballets, and The Joffrey Ballet was the first American company to perform the work of Danish choreographer August Bournonville.

Robert Joffrey also departed from the traditional ranking system seen in most ballet companies where most dancers know the caliber of roles they will receive based on ranking. He opted instead for an ensemble group that could easily change in and out of leading roles, leading to a stronger sense of unity.

He was co-president of the International Dance Committee with Bolshoi Ballet Director Yuri Grigorovich, a member of the National Council of the Arts, a juror for Denmark's Hans Christian Andersen Dance Awards, and has won the Dance Magazine Award, the Capezio Award, and New York City's Handel Medallion.

Joffrey died in New York City of HIV/AIDS on March 25, 1988, at age 57. He is interred at the Cathedral of St. John the Divine. Initially, to protect the reputation of his company, obituaries listed the cause of death as organ failure.

Joffrey was inducted into the National Museum of Dance's Mr. & Mrs. Cornelius Vanderbilt Whitney Hall of Fame in 2000.

== See also ==
- List of dancers
