= Gerald Arpino =

American dancer and choreographer (1923–2008)

- Arpino in 1981
- Born: Genarro Peter Arpino; January 14, 1923; Staten Island, New York, U.S.
- Died: October 29, 2008 (aged 85); Chicago, Illinois, U.S.
- Occupation(s): Choreographer, dancer, director
- Years active: 1950–2007
- Partner: Robert Joffrey
- Career
- Former groups: Joffrey Ballet
- Website: arpinojoffreyfoundation.org

Gerald Arpino (January 14, 1923 – October 29, 2008) was an American dancer and choreographer. He was the co-founder of the Joffrey Ballet and succeeded Robert Joffrey as its artistic director in 1988.

== Life and career ==
Born on Staten Island, New York, Gerald Arpino studied ballet with Mary Ann Wells, while stationed with the Coast Guard in Seattle, Washington. Arpino first met Robert Joffrey at Wells's school. He studied modern dance with May O'Donnell in whose company he appeared in the 1950s.

In 1956, Arpino was a founding member of the Robert Joffrey Theatre Ballet with Robert Joffrey. He served as co-director of the company's school, the American Ballet Center, and was the leading dancer until an injury forced him to stop in 1963. By 1965 he had choreographed five works for the company, and became the Joffrey's co-director and resident choreographer. In the first twenty-five years of the company's existence, Arpino had created more than a third of all its commissioned ballets.

After the death of Robert Joffrey in 1988, Arpino became the artistic director of the Joffrey Ballet and in 1995 moved the company to Chicago. In July 2007, he was named "Artistic Director Emeritus" as a search for a successor began. Arpino suffered from prostate cancer for seven months and eventually died on October 29, 2008.

Malcolm McDowell plays a character loosely based on Arpino in the Robert Altman film The Company, which had the participation of the Joffrey Ballet.

In 2014 Arpino was inducted into the Chicago Gay and Lesbian Hall of Fame.

== Choreography for The Joffrey Ballet ==
- Partita for 4 (1961) Music by Vittorio Reiti
- Ropes (1961) Music by Charles Ives
- Sea Shadow (1961) Music by Maurice Ravel, second movement of Piano Concerto in G. Alternate music by Michael Colgrass, 1963 (due to copyright problems with Ravel).
- Incubus (1962) Music by Anton Webern
- The Palace (1963) Music by Rebekah Harkness
- Viva Vivaldi! (1965) Music by Antonio Vivaldi
- Olympics (1966) Music by Toshiro Mayuzumi
- Nightwings (1966) Music by John LaMontaine
- Arcs and Angels (1967) Music by William Laws
- Cello Concerto (1967) Music by Antonio Vivaldi
- Elegy (1967) Music by Andrzej Panufnik
- Secret Places (1968) Music by Wolfgang Amadeus Mozart
- The Clowns (1968) Music by Hershy Kay
- A Light Fantastic (1968) Music by B. Britten
- Fanfarita (1968) Music by Ruperto Chapi y Lorente
- Animus (1969) Music by Jacob Druckman
- The Poppet (1969) Music by Hans Werner Henze
- Confetti (1970) Music by Gioachino Rossini
- Solarwind (1970) Music by Jacob Druckman
- Trinity (1970) Music by Alan Raph and Lee Holdridge
- Reflections (1971) Music by Pyotr Ilyich Tchaikovsky
- Valentine (1971) Music by Jacob Druckman
- Kettentanz (1971) Music by Johann Strauss and Johann Simon Mayr
- Chabriesque (1972) Music by Emmanuel Chabrier
- Sacred Grove on Mount Tamalpais (1972) Music by Alan Raph
- Jackpot (1972) Music by Jacob Druckman
- The Relativity of Icarus (1974) Music by Gerhard Samuel
- Drums, Dreams and Banjos (1975) Music by Stephen Foster
- Orpheus Times Light (1976) Music by José Serebrier
- Touch Me (1977) Music by Rev. James Cleveland
- L'Air D'Esprit (1978) Music by Adolphe Adam
- Suite Saint-Saëns (1978) Music by Camille Saint-Saëns
- Choura (1978) Music by Riccardo Drigo
- Epode (1979) Music by Dmitri Shostakovich
- Celebration (1980) Music by Dmitri Shostakovich
- Diverdissemente (1980) Music by Giuseppe Verdi
- Light Rain (1981) Music by Douglas Adams and Russ Gauthier
- Round of Angels (1983) Music by Gustav Mahler
- Quarter Tones for Mr. B. (1983) Music by Teo Macero
- Italian Suite (1983) Music by Ermanno Wolf-Ferrari
- Jamboree (1984) Music by Teo Macero
- Birthday Variations (1986) Music by Giuseppe Verdi
- Anniversary Pas de Deux (1986) Music by Victor Herbert
- Waltz of the Flowers (The Nutcracker) (1987) Music by Pyotr Ilyich Tchaikovsky
- The Land of Snow (The Nutcracker) (1987) Music by Pyotr Ilyich Tchaikovsky
- The Pantages and the Palace Present "Two-A-Day" (1989) Music by Rebekah Harkness and E. Kaplan
- I/DNA (2003) Music by Charles Ives
- Ruth: Ricordi Per Due (2004) Music by Tomaso Albinoni
