= Kurt Jooss =

German ballet dancer and choreographer

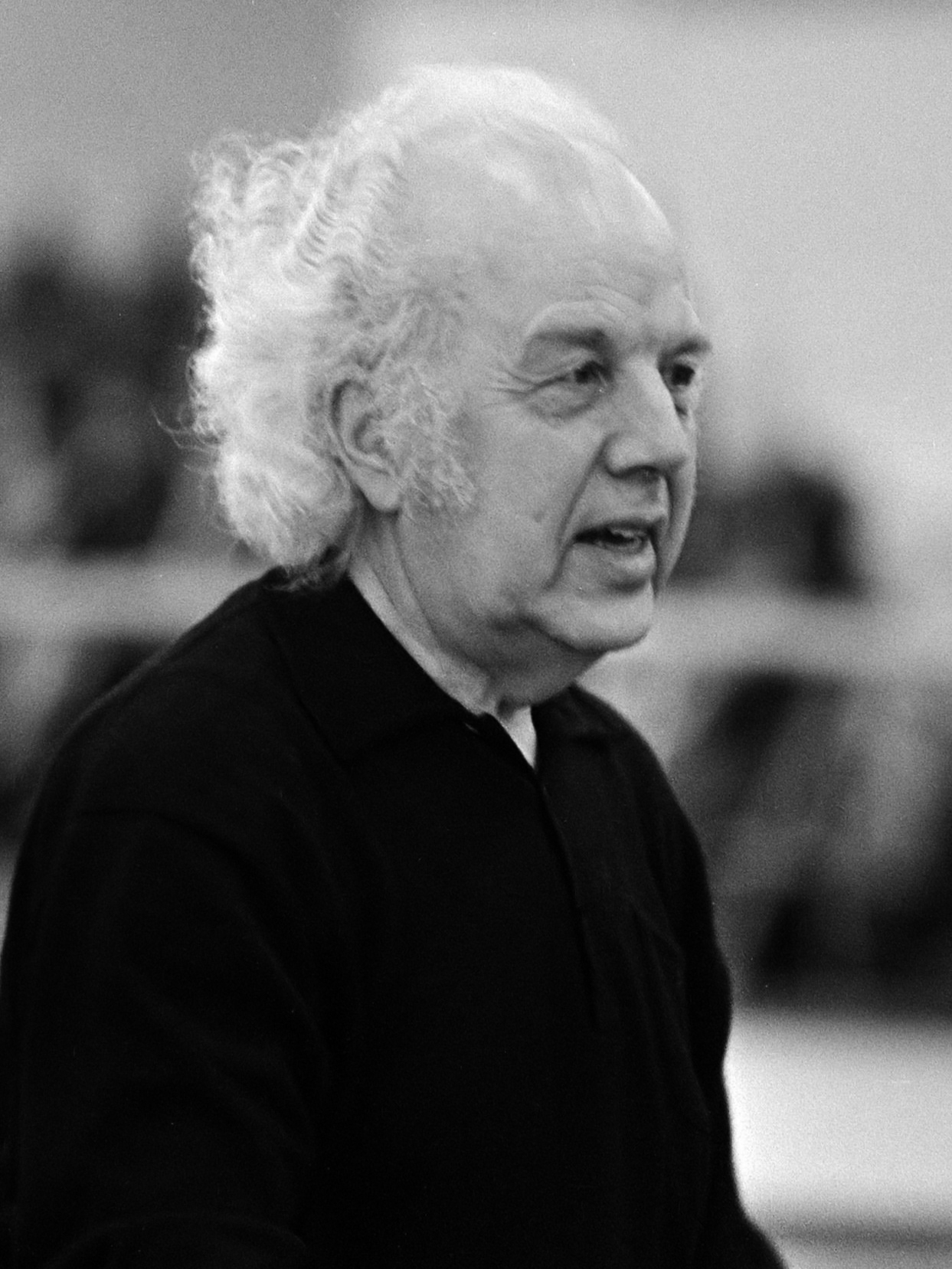
- Jooss in 1971
- Born: 12 January 1901; Wasseralfingen, Germany
- Died: 22 May 1979 (aged 78); Heilbronn, West Germany
- Occupations: Ballet dancer, choreographer
- Years active: 1920–1968
- Known for: Founding Tanztheater
- Notable work: The Green Table

Kurt Jooss (12 January 1901 – 22 May 1979) was a famous German ballet dancer and choreographer mixing classical ballet with theatre; he is also widely regarded as the founder of Tanztheater. Jooss is noted for establishing several dance companies, including most notably, the Folkwang Tanztheater, in Essen.

== Life and career ==
Jooss was born in Wasseralfingen, Germany. From an early age, he was interested in singing, drama and visual arts. He also played the piano and was a keen photographer. He began his career in the 1920s and from 1920 to 1924 studied under and danced lead roles in the choreography of Rudolf von Laban (who was a trained visual artist and developer of dance theory) and the movement named Ausdruckstanz. Jooss used narratives and modern theatre styles to make performable works of Dance Theatre, further developing the work of Laban and his system of notation. Within a year of leaving Laban, Jooss took the opportunity to establish his own dance company called, Die Neue Tanzbühne. It was here Jooss met Fritz Cohen, the Jewish composer who worked with Jooss on many of his famous pieces.

Jooss and Cohen shared the belief that choreography and musical composition should evolve together to give expression of the dramatic idea in unified style and form. In 1925 Jooss and Sigurd Leeder joined a group of artists and opened a new dance school called "Westfälische Akademie für Bewegung, Sprache und Musik". Jooss and Leeder went to Paris in 1926 to study classical ballet with Russian ballerina Lubov Egorova.

In 1927 Jooss and Leeder's work Dance of Death was criticised for being too avant-garde; this resulted in the theatre of Münster changing personnel and programs. Because of this, many of Jooss's colleagues left. The same year Jooss moved the "Westfälische Akademie" to Essen, and it became the Folkwang Schule.

Jooss disliked plotless dances and preferred themes that addressed moral issues. Naturalistic movement, large-scale unison and characterisation were used by Jooss to address political concerns of the time. His most important choreographic work, The Green Table (1932), had won first prize at an international competition for new choreography held by the Archives Internationales de la Danse in Paris in 1932. It was a strong anti-war statement, and was made a year before Adolf Hitler became the chancellor of Germany. The Green Table is considered his most popular piece.

In 1933 Jooss was forced to flee Germany when the Nazis asked him to dismiss the Jews from his company and he refused. Jooss and Leeder (and doubtless Fritz Cohen and other members of his original company) took refuge in the Netherlands before resettling in England. After touring in Europe and America, Jooss and Leeder opened a school at Dartington Hall in Devon (which became the wartime base of the Sadler's Wells ballet company). A piece he choreographed at this time was a light-hearted one (in comparison to The Green Table) named "Ball in Old Vienna (1932)".

In 1934, whilst in England Jooss added new works to his repertoire, including Pandora (1944), contained disturbing images of human disaster and tragedy, which was later interpreted by some as foretelling the dropping of the atom bombs on Japan a year later.

However, in 1940, Jooss was interned as an enemy alien by the British authorities and held in a prison camp on the Isle of Man. However, on the high-level intervention of Maynard Keynes, Jooss was released. In 1942 Jooss was working on a Sadler’s Wells opera company touring production of the Marriage of Figaro engaging William Chappell to design both sets and costumes, Chappell at that time serving as a cadet officer in the Royal Artillery.

With his company, the Jooss Ballet went on world tours until his company disintegrated in 1947.

Jooss left England in 1949 to return to Essen, Germany. Jooss continued to teach and choreograph for 19 years. One of his students from this period was the choreographer Pina Bausch.

He retired in 1968 and died in Heilbronn, West Germany, 11 years later, aged 78, from injuries sustained in an automobile accident.

Kurt Jooss works are still performed today, especially The Green Table. Anna Markard (Jooss' daughter) supervised companies that perform his works until her death, conserving authenticity of the author of Dance Theatre.
