= Joffrey Ballet =

Ballet company (founded in 1956)

The Joffrey Ballet
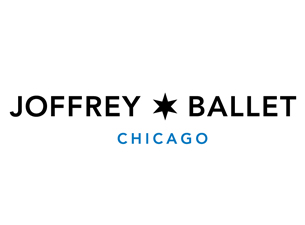

General information
- Name: The Joffrey Ballet
- Year founded: 1956; 70 years ago
- Founders: Robert Joffrey; Gerald Arpino
- Location: Joffrey Tower; 10 East Randolph Street, Chicago, IL 60601
- Website: joffrey.org

Artistic staff
- Artistic director: Ashley Wheater MBE
- Music director: Scott Speck, Chicago Philharmonic

Other
- Official school: The Joffrey Academy of Dance, Official School of The Joffrey Ballet

The Joffrey Ballet is an American dance company and training institution in Chicago, Illinois. The Joffrey regularly performs classical and contemporary ballets during its annual performance season at the Civic Opera House, including its annual presentation of The Nutcracker.

Founded in 1956 by dance pioneers Robert Joffrey and Gerald Arpino, the company has earned a reputation for boundary-breaking performances, including its 1987 presentation of Vaslav Nijinsky's The Rite of Spring, which reconstructed the original choreography from the 1913 premiere that was thought to be lost. Many choreographers have worked with the Joffrey, including Paul Taylor, Twyla Tharp, and George Balanchine.

== History ==
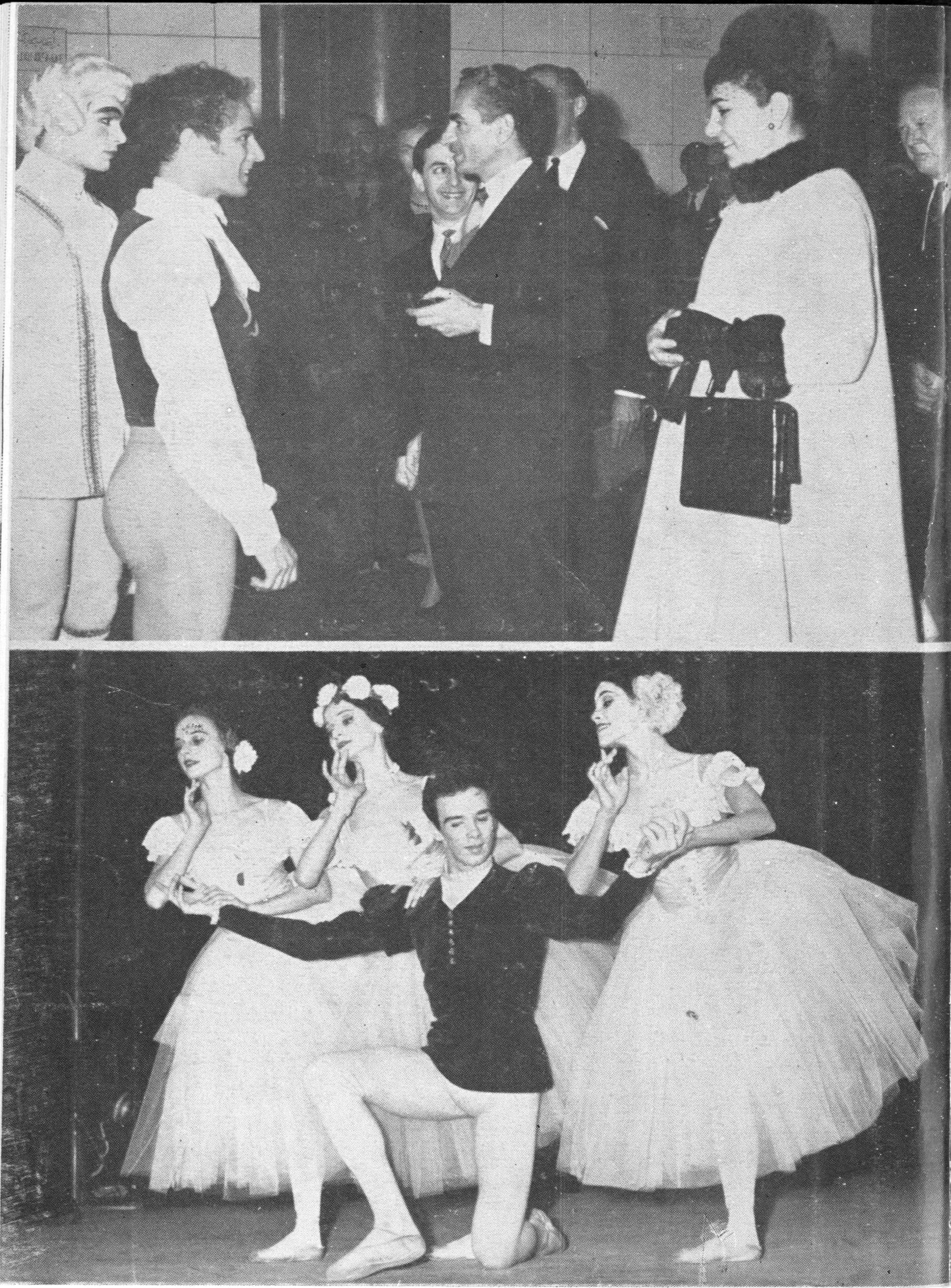
Mohammad Reza Pahlavi, Farah Diba and Joffrey Ballet dancers

From its foundation in 1956 through the mid-1960s, Joffrey's and Arpino's dance company initially toured the United States and sometimes other parts of the world (for example: the Soviet Union in 1963). The dance company gained its first permanent residency in New York City in 1966, and expanded to Los Angeles in 1982. In Los Angeles in 1987, the group premiered a reconstructed version of Igor Stravinsky's The Rite of Spring, which they performed many times in the subsequent years. The expanded ensemble ended its residency in Los Angeles in 1992, and the company moved from New York City to Chicago in 1995, where it remains to this day.

=== Early years ===
In 1956, a time during which most touring companies performed only reduced versions of ballet classics, Robert Joffrey and Gerald Arpino formed a six-dancer ensemble that toured the country in a station wagon pulling a U-Haul trailer, performing original ballets created by Joffrey. The original six dancers were Arpino, Dianne Consoer, Brunilda Ruiz, Glen Tetley, Beatrice Tompkins, and John Wilson. While Joffrey stayed in New York City to teach ballet classes and earn money to pay the dancers' salaries, Arpino led the troupe. The ensemble first performed in a major city in Chicago in 1957. The Joffrey Ballet eventually settled down in New York City, under the name the Robert Joffrey Theatre Ballet. In 1962, modern choreographer Alvin Ailey was invited to make a work for the company. Rebekah Harkness was an important early benefactor and she made international touring possible (Soviet Union, 1963), but in 1964 she and Joffrey parted ways.

=== New York residency ===
Joffrey started again, building up a new company that made its debut in 1965 as the Joffrey Ballet. Following a successful season at the New York City Center in 1966, it was invited to become City Center's resident ballet company with Joffrey as artistic director and Arpino as chief choreographer. Arpino's 1970 rock ballet Trinity was well received; Joffrey revived Kurt Jooss's The Green Table in 1967, followed by revivals of Ashton's Façade, Cranko's Pineapple Poll, Fokine's Petrushka (with Rudolf Nureyev in 1979), Nijinsky's Afternoon of a Faun, also with Nureyev, and Massine's Le Tricorne, Le Beau Danube and Parade. In 1973, Joffrey asked Twyla Tharp to create her first commissioned ballet, Deuce Coupe. The company continued as City Center Joffrey Ballet until 1977.

=== Expansion ===
From 1977, it performed as the Joffrey Ballet, with a second home established in Los Angeles from 1982 to 1992. In 1995, the company left New York City for Chicago to establish a permanent residence there.

=== Chicago residency ===
The first few years in Chicago were financially arduous for the company, nearly causing it to close several times, but audiences later became larger and younger. In 2005, the Joffrey Ballet celebrated its 10th anniversary in Chicago and in 2007 concluded a two-season-long 50th-anniversary celebration, including a "River to River" tour of free, outdoor performances across Iowa, sponsored by Hancher Auditorium at the University of Iowa.

=== Reconstructing The Rite of Spring ===
In fall 1987, the Joffrey Ballet premiered a reconstructed version of Igor Stravinsky's seminal ballet The Rite of Spring in the city of Los Angeles. The original ballet debuted in 1913 in Paris, France, and was choreographed by Vaslav Nijinsky. Dance experts Millicent Hodson and Kenneth Archer spent 18 years gathering research on the original ballet in order to properly reconstruct it. Eighty percent of the original costumes were located and reconstructed for the performance, and Hodson and Archer were able to consult with Nijinsky's rehearsal assistant Marie Rambert on the original choreography, before her death in 1982.

== Activities ==
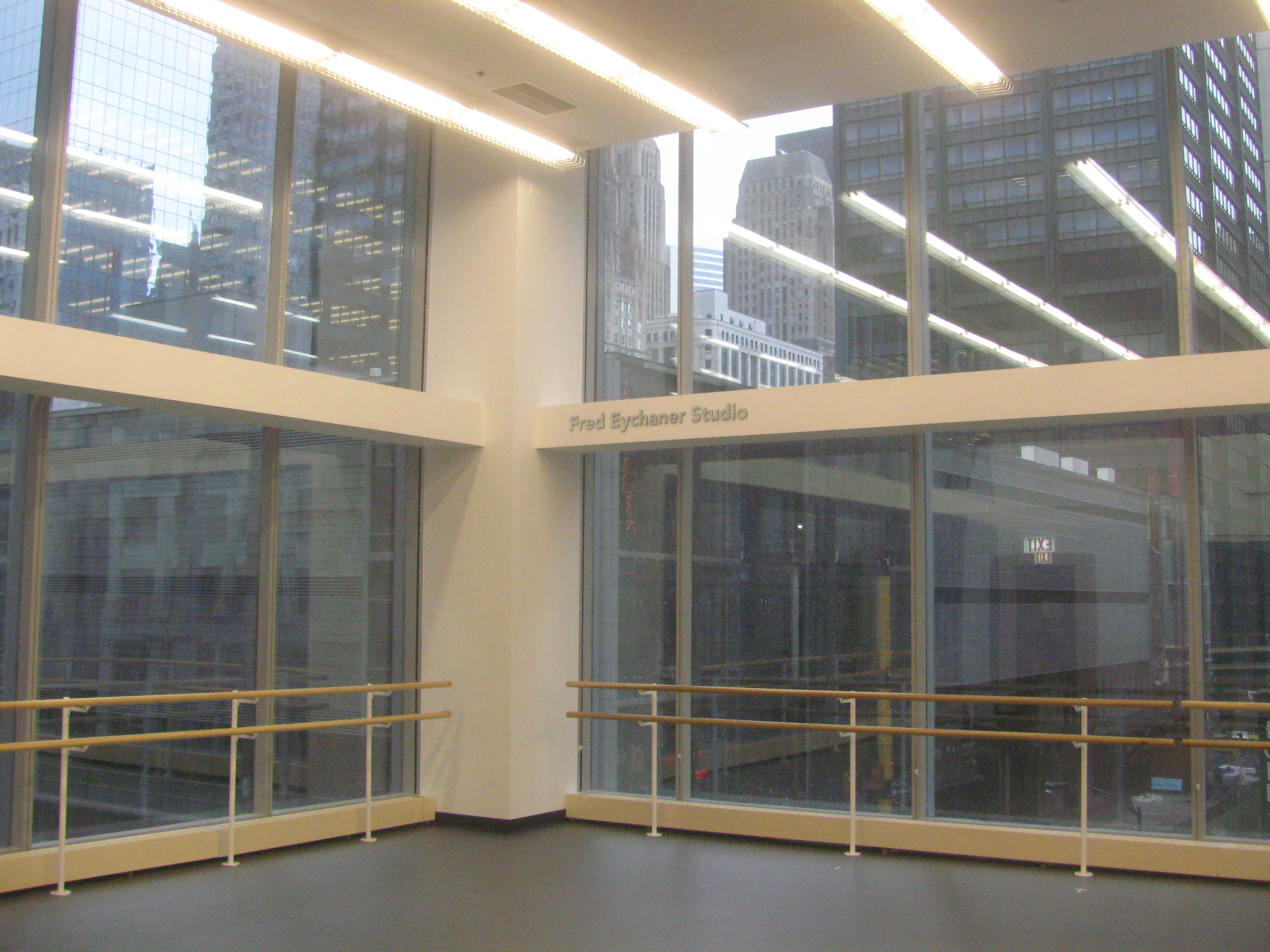
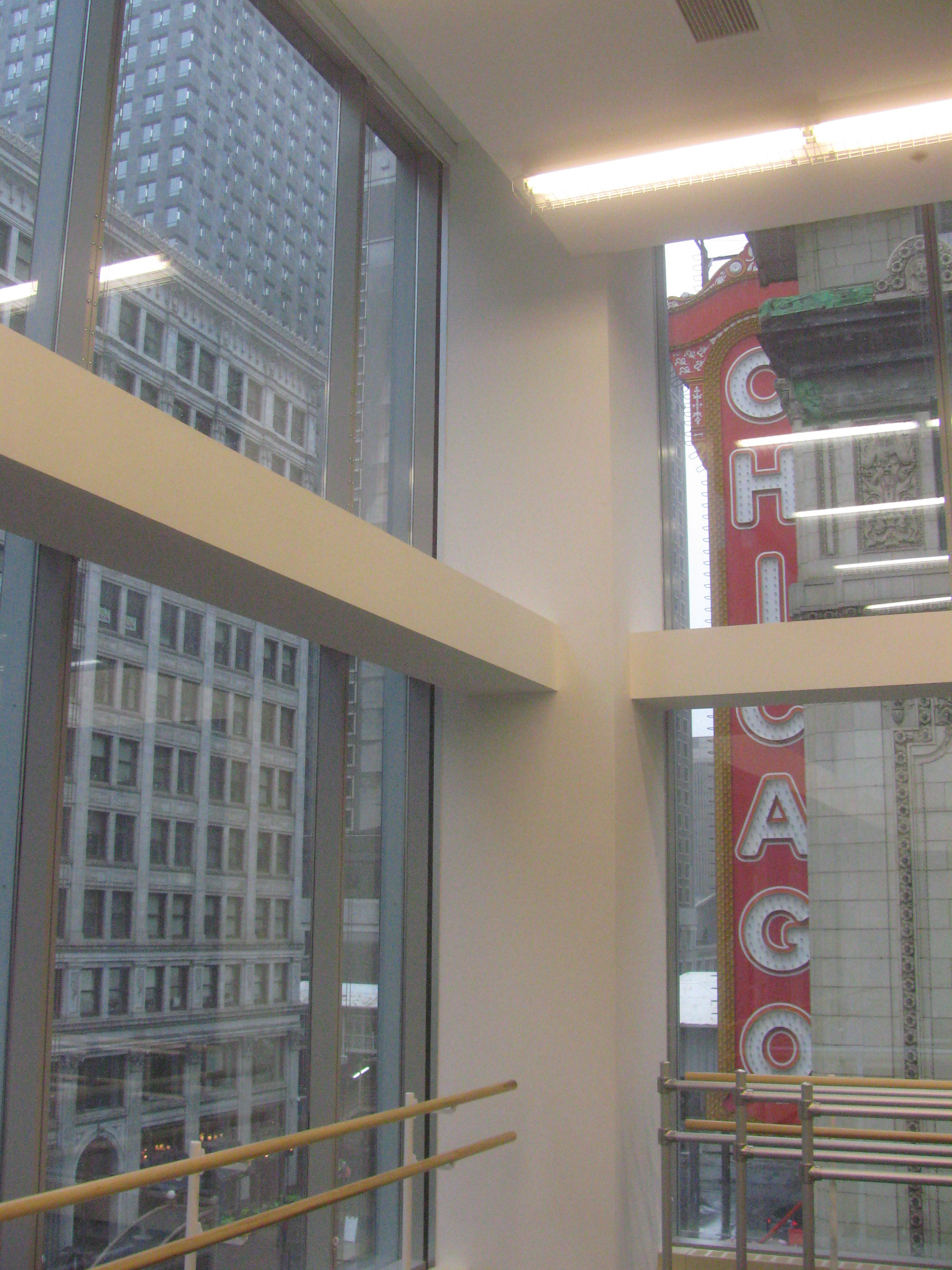
Joffrey rehearsal studios along State Street have views of Block 37 (top) and the Chicago Theatre marquee (bottom).

The company, consisting of 40 dancers, performs its regular September–May season at the Civic Opera House in Chicago, and engages in several domestic and international tours throughout the year. Its repertoire consists of both classical and contemporary pieces, as well as annual December performances of The Nutcracker, presented in conjunction with the Chicago Philharmonic. Since 2016, the company has presented the version of The Nutcracker, commissioned from choreographer Christopher Wheeldon, which is re-set at the time of the 1893 Chicago World's Fair.

In 2007, Gerald Arpino retired from day-to-day operations, becoming artistic director emeritus until his death in 2009. In October 2007, former Joffrey dancer Ashley Wheater, assistant artistic director and ballet master for San Francisco Ballet, became the third artistic director. In 2019, the Joffery presented the world premiere of an entirely new "story ballet" based on Anna Karenina. Choreographed by Yuri Possokhov, the Joffrey and The Australian Ballet also commissioned from composer Ilya Demutsky a new full-length orchestral score, the first in the Joffrey's history.

The Joffrey is located in Joffrey Tower, at 10 East Randolph Street in downtown Chicago. The company has an extensive touring schedule, an education program including the Joffrey Academy of Dance, Official School of The Joffrey Ballet [since renamed], Community Engagement program, and collaborations with other visual and performing arts organizations. In September 2024, the Joffrey Ballet received a $5 million dollar gift from the Grainger Foundation to support the education of young ballet dancers and the school, which had been founded in 2010, was renamed Grainger Academy of The Joffrey Ballet.

In 2021, the Joffrey moved from the Auditorium Theater—where it had performed since 1998—to the Civic Opera House, as part of a partnership with the Lyric Opera of Chicago.

In September of 2025, the Joffrey opened its 70th anniversary season with the U.S. premiere of Liam Scarlett’s Carmen.

== In popular culture ==
The Joffrey Ballet was the first dance company to perform at the White House at Jacqueline Kennedy’s invitation, the first to appear on American television, the first classical dance company to use multi-media, the first to create a ballet set to rock music, the first to appear on the cover of TIME magazine, and the first company to have had a major motion picture based on it, Robert Altman's penultimate film, The Company. In it, Malcolm McDowell played the ballet company's artistic director, a character based on Gerald Arpino. The film is composed of stories gathered from the dancers, choreographers, and staff of the Joffrey Ballet. Most of the roles are played by company members.

The Joffrey Ballet appeared in the motion picture Save the Last Dance (2001), when the two protagonists of the story saw the company perform Sea Shadow and Les Présages in Chicago.

In the television series Glee (2012), character Mike Chang is given a scholarship to attend the Joffrey Academy of Dance in Chicago.

In 2024, The Joffrey + Ballet in the U.S., the first retrospective exhibition of the history of the company and of Robert Joffrey, opened at the New York Public Library for the Performing Arts. In October of 2025, the exhibition moved to Wrightwood 659 in Chicago. Curated by Julia Foulkes with assistance from former Joffrey dancer Nicole Duffy, it draws on the extensive Joffrey archives, held at the library.

== See also ==
- Billboards, a Joffrey Ballet production based on the songs of Prince.
