= Ann Marie DeAngelo =

American choreographer

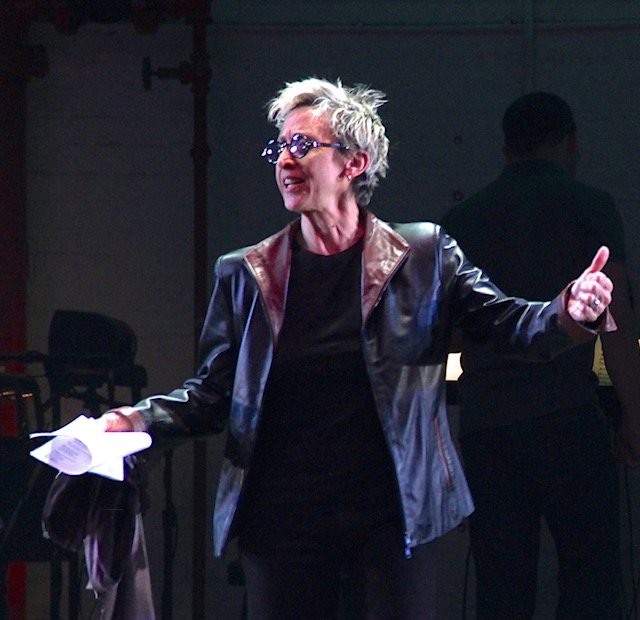
- DeAngelo at New York City Center, 2015
- Born: Pittston, Pennsylvania, U.S.
- Education: San Francisco Ballet School
- Occupations: Choreographer; consultant; director; producer; teacher
- Years active: 1970s–present
- Career
- Current group: DeAngelo Productions
- Former groups: Joffrey Ballet; Ballet Omaha; Ballet de Monterrey
- Dances: Contemporary ballet; classical ballet; multi-genre
- Website: annmariedeangelo.com

Ann Marie DeAngelo is an American choreographer, director, producer, teacher, consultant and former dancer. She was a leading ballerina with the Joffrey Ballet, where early on she was pegged by Time magazine as "one of America's most outstanding ballerinas" and where she later served as associate director at the time of the company's move to Chicago in 1995.

DeAngelo was the founding artistic director of Ballet de Monterrey, and served as artistic director of Ballet Omaha during the 1990s. She founded her own experimental troupe in the late 1980s called Ballet D'Angelo, creating several full-evening productions that toured extensively in Europe.

She is currently the director of DeAngelo Productions, an umbrella company for creating and producing dance-related projects. She continues to work internationally as a director, choreographer, and teacher.

== Early life and education ==
DeAngelo was born in Pittston, Pennsylvania, and grew up in Glendale, California. Her mother enrolled her in ballet at the age of three-and-a-half to help her overcome shyness before kindergarten. DeAngelo later trained in Burbank, California, at Roland & Reid Dance with Cecchetti specialist Frederika Mohr, and subsequently studied on a Ford Foundation scholarship at the San Francisco Ballet School with former Kirov Ballet principals Anatole Vilzak and Ludmilla Schollar.

== Career ==
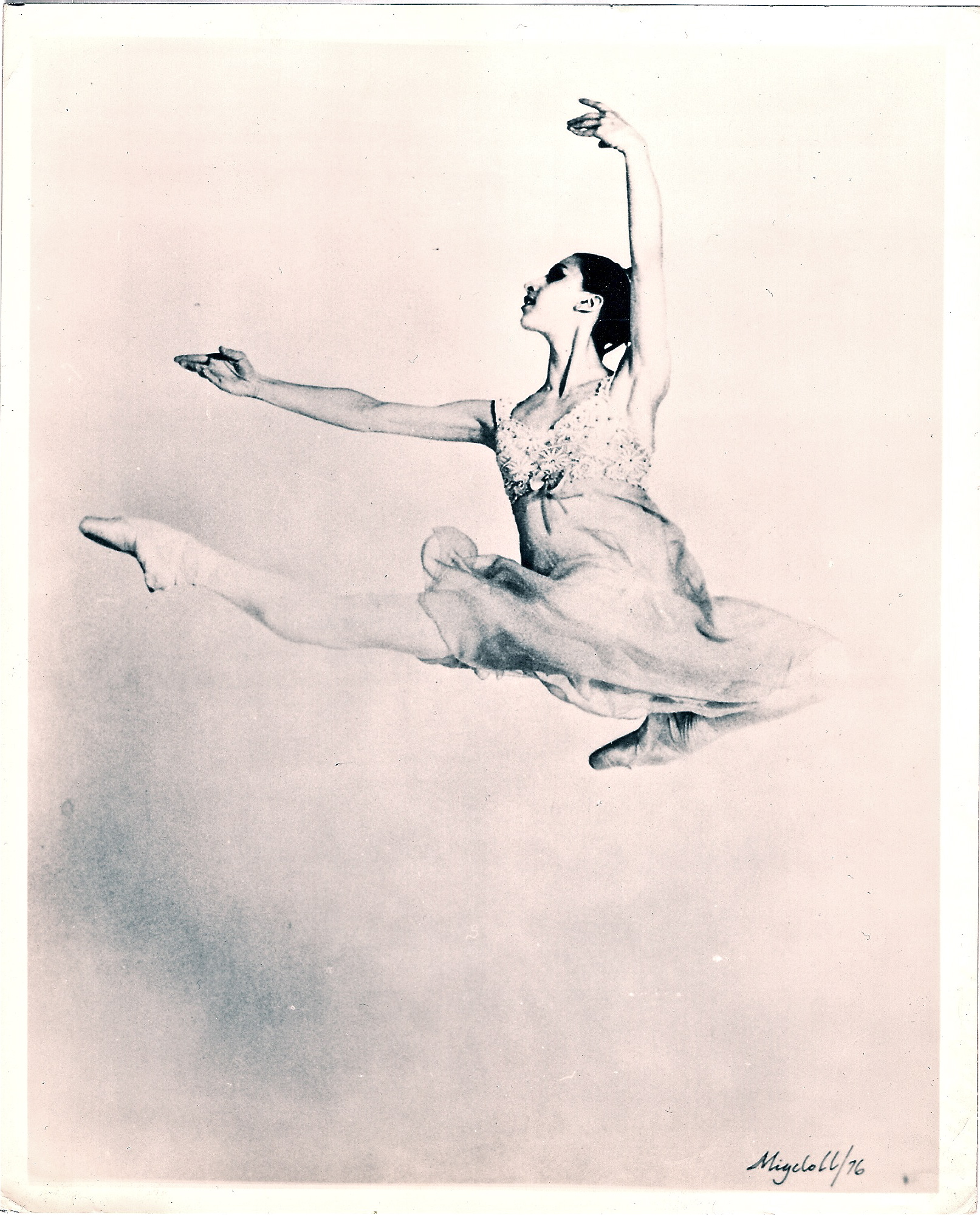
Ann Marie DeAngelo in performance, known for her virtuosic ballet technique and expressive artistry.

=== Dancing ===
Renowned for a "powerful virtuoso technique", DeAngelo was trained in Burbank, California, with Frederika Mohr in the Cecchetti method of ballet, and later with Kirov Ballet veterans Anatole Vilzak and Ludmilla Schollar at San Francisco Ballet School under a Ford Foundation scholarship. She landed her first job with the San Francisco Opera Ballet. In New York she joined Joffrey II as an apprentice before joining the Joffrey Ballet in 1973. She worked with the Joffrey for 10 years, performing in works such as Viva Vivaldi, The Taming of the Shrew by John Cranko; the Cowgirl in Agnes de Mille's Rodeo, a reconstruction of La Vivandiere by Arthur Saint-Léon; As Time Goes By, Deuce Coupe II and Cacklin' Hen by Twyla Tharp; and works by Frederick Ashton, George Balanchine, Agnes de Mille, William Forsythe, Kurt Jooss, Antony Tudor, and others. Reviewing her performance in Pas des Deesses by Robert Joffrey, New York Times critic Anna Kisselgoff wrote, "[DeAngelo] is a most spectacular dancer who never fails to dazzle.... [She] opened the ballet in a highly virtuosic solo that exploited her phenomenal technique."

DeAngelo performed the Doll in Petrushka with Rudolf Nureyev at New York State Theater (currently David H. Koch Theater). In the mid-1980s, she was a member of the Frankfurt Ballet under directorship of William Forsythe.

In 1976, she competed in the International Ballet Competition in Varna, Bulgaria, where she received a special award for technical excellence. She was the featured dancer in a TV documentary special on CBS. At the competition, she met the legendary ballerina Alicia Alonso, and was invited to perform at her International Ballet Festival in Havanna, Cuba. She later created works for the company.

Throughout her performing career, DeAngelo worked internationally as a guest artist dancing the classical ballets such as Coppelia, Giselle, Swan Lake, and Sleeping Beauty with various ballet companies including the Royal Winnipeg Ballet and Royal Ballet of Flanders and The National Ballet of Cuba; festivals including Jacob's Pillow; and independent tours such as Stars of American Ballet (dancing with Danilo Radojevic and Fernando Bujones), Stars of World Ballet in Australia, dancing with both Danilo Radojevic and Fernando Bujones in Le Corsaire, Flames of Paris and Don Quixote pas de deux; and alongside other talent including Margot Fonteyn, Peter Breuer, Wayne Eagling, Flemming Flindt, Maina Gielgud, Cynthia Gregory, Birgit Keil, Māris Liepa, Yoko Morishita, Merle Park, and David Wall; and Dance, Dance, Dance Canadian tour with Frank Augustyn.

In 1980, DeAngelo was featured in a dance film about Anna Pavlova called Pavlova: A Tribute to the Legendary Ballerina (1982).

In 1989, DeAngelo performed on Sesame Street with James "Skeeter Rabbit" Higgins in a duet created by Toni Basil called Stop Dancing.

=== Choreography ===
DeAngelo has choreographed over 60 ballets, including for opera and other dance venues. She created her first work in 1980, called La Grande Faux Pas. In 1984, she received a Jerome Robbins Foundation grant to create a piece for the Joffrey II called In Kazmidity with music by Léo Delibes (later staged for Ballet Trockadero in 1990). She soon began to explore her choreographic aesthetic of mixing dance styles and blending forms. She choreographed Autumn Baachanal for the film Pavlova: A Tribute to the Legendary Ballerina, performing with Ron Reagan Jr.

In 1990, DeAngelo created Out of Silence with music by Yanni for the National Ballet of Cuba; and also a pas de trois called Lilith featuring Lorena Feijoo. Both these works later were integrated into a piece for Ballet de Monterrey called Paradiso (1991). Hip-hop pioneer Steffan "Mr. Wiggles" Clemente was featured in that work in a leading role, the first time a street dancer had been integrated into a traditional ballet.

DeAngelo created several works for Ballet de Monterrey, including Mademoiselle de M, a 35-minute work based on Theophile's Mademoiselle de Maupin with music by Franz Liszt and Enigma; Le Papillon, to music of Jacques Offenbach; and a re-staging of The Nutcracker.

In 2003, DeAngelo collaborated with composer Conni Ellisor to bring the Bell Witch legend to life in The Bell Witch for Nashville Ballet, with an original score by Ellisor and 3-D scenic design by Gerald Marks. For this she was nominated for a Benois de la Danse Award and a segment of the ballet was performed at the Bolshoi Theatre, Moscow.

DeAngelo was a choreographer for the first National Choreographers Initiative, and for Dance Break, 2006. In 2007, DeAngelo began a work-in-development called In the Mix! The piece included ballet dancers, hip hop and tap dance artists, Cirque du Soleil veterans, gymnastics, and cheerleading in a cross-genre exploration of movement in many forms. This show was later in development as America Dances, a variety show of dance, eventually produced as part of Capezio's 130th anniversary celebration.

In 2010, DeAngelo choreographed The Promise, a new musical created for the Shanghai Expo 2010. DeAngelo returned to Beijing, China in 2017 choreographing for another new musical based on Kublai Khan called Xanadu. Later the title was changed to Dream Dances when it as recreated in Lanqi a province of Xilinhot in Inner Mongolia.

DeAngelo's choreography was seen at City Center in New York, and the Bolshoi Theater in Moscow (May 2013).

DeAngelo has presented choreography from 2002 to 2015 as part of her multigenre dance-extravaganza productions that she also produced and directed at City Center in New York City, and in 2018 The Cobbler & the Ballerina at the Smith Center for the Performing Arts in Las Vegas, Nevada.

She has taught choreography through the perspective of focus at University of California, Irvine, University of California, Santa Barbara and Hotchkiss School (2017, 2018)

=== Artistic director ===
Ballet D'Angelo – under DeAngelo's direction, Ballet D'Angelo toured extensively in Europe and Cuba from 1984 to 1988. Works included Zeitgiest I and II, The Last of the Best, and Gypsie Band.

Ballet de Monterrey – as founding artistic director of Ballet de Monterrey, DeAngelo worked with mentor Alicia Alonso who allowed her to use several Cuban dancers, teachers and ballet masters. DeAngelo also used American dancers and imported unique talent such as US Olympic team rhythmic gymnast Charlene Edwards and Mr. Wiggles − introducing a cross-pollination of work to Mexico. DeAngelo created a classical yet innovative "company of the Americas". She received the Margot Fonteyn Award for special artistic achievement for her contributions.

Ballet Omaha – during her season as artistic director of Ballet Omaha she produced works by George Balanchine, Ann Carlson, Lew Christensen, Laura Dean, Charles Moulton, and others.

Joffrey Ballet of Chicago – in 1995 as associate artistic director, DeAngelo created a vision for the Joffrey's relocation from New York, and along with Artistic Director Gerald Arpino, a successful vision for its artistic future. Arpino created an evening called "Legends" spotlighting female choreographers choreography about iconic female legend singers. Choreographers included DeAngelo, Laura Dean, Joanna Haigood, Ann Reinking, and Margo Sappington.

In the 2000s, DeAngelo was co-artistic director of the Hamptons Dance Festival with Cynthia Gregory.

=== Director, producer, and other work ===
DeAngelo has created and staged many special shows and events, including Shall We Dance, a dance tribute to composer Richard Rodgers as part of the Rodgers Centenary celebration in 2002.

Since 2002, DeAngelo has staged the annual gala for Career Transition For Dancers. Those shows include: Dancing on Air, That's Entertainment, One World, Dance Rocks!, America Dances!, 25th Anniversary, and A Halloween Thriller, and Jump for Joy in 2012, Broadway & Beyond in 2013, New York, New York in 2014, 30th Anniversary Celebration in 2015. In 2010, she commissioned Marvin Hamlisch to write a new song called "I'm Really Dancing" with lyrics by Rupert Holmes for that year's gala. Through her "amalgamations of dance" evenings, DeAngelo has presented and commissioned over 200 works from various dance companies and choreographers across different disciplines. She has worked with theater artists and Tony Award winners such as Paula Abdul, Debbie Allen, Michael Douglas, Christine Ebersole, Robert Fairchild, Catherine Zeta-Jones, James Earl Jones, Sutton Foster, Savion Glover, Jane Krakowski, Angela Lansbury, Liza Minnelli, Bebe Neuwirth, Billy Porter, Ann Reinking, Chita Rivera, Kelly Ripa, Tommy Tune, Ben Vereen, and Karen Ziemba, as well as producer Nigel Lythgoe.

In 2001, she created and directed The Variety Show – Jugglin' Styles which premiered at the Annenberg Center in Philadelphia.

In 2009, she was director of the show Thank You, Gregory – A Tribute to Legends of Tap that opened at the Annenberg Center for the Performing Arts in Philadelphia, featuring Maurice Hines and Jason Samuels Smith. In the same year, she also directed Ghettomade, a work created by Mr. Wiggles that premiered at Sadlers Wells in London. Currently the show is expanding to include Rock Steady Crew.

In 2012, she conceived, produced, and directed the 125th anniversary gala for Capezio at City Center in New York City in 2012.

In 2016, Career Transition for Dancers merged with the Actors Fund and is a part of Bebe Neuwirth's Dancers Resource; however, DeAngelo continued to produce and direct fundraisers in 2016 and 2017.

She returned to produce and direct the Capezio 130th anniversary show in 2018, and the Capezio Awards. Awardees included Debbie Allen, Michelle Dorrance, David Parsons, Wendy Whelan, and Mr. Wiggles, who performed on the evening celebration along with others including Bessie Award winner Ephrat Asherie, Contemporary West Dance Theatre, DNA, Nevada Ballet Theatre, Parsons Dance, and SYTYCD winner Lex Ishimoto. Host was Nigel Lythgoe, and Savion Glover was a presenter.

She has taught for numerous dance companies and universities, as well as workshops to non-dancers called "Bringing Performance to Life" at resorts and spas. She has taught personalities such as Bette Midler.

== Choreography ==
- 2018 The Cobbler & The Ballerina, Capezio 130th Anniversary, Las Vegas
- 2017 Code Vivaldi, Hotchkiss School; Dream City, Beijing, China
- 2017 Dream City (Kublai Kahn), LanQi, Inner Mongolia
- 2016 The Cello Song, Rosie's Theater Kids, New York City
- 2015 American Dance Collage, City Center, New York City
- 2014 Guy.., National Choreography Initiative gala
- 2013 Last Time I Cry, Bolshoi Theatre, Moscow
- 2012 The Cobbler Rap/The Cobbler & The Ballerina,(Capezio 125th Anniversary Gala)
- 2012 Blackberry Winter, American Repertory Ballet
- 2011 She Remembers?, Career Transition for Dancers (CTFD) Gala, City Center NYC
- 2010 The Promise (a musical), Shanghai Expo 2010
- 2010 I'm Really Dancing, Final CTFD Gala (new song by Marvin Hamlisch)
- 2010 The Process: Discovery & Integration, National Choreography Initiative
- 2009 A Tribute to Broadway, Ballet de Monterrey
- 2009 Ghettomade: A Journey Thru Time, Sadler's Wells Theatre, London
- 2008 La Noche, Ballet de Monterrey, Joyce Theater
- 2008 In The Mix!, Workshop, New York City
- 2007 P.E.A.C.E., Rosie's Theater Kids
- 2007 Jugglin' Styles II, (creator/contributing)
- 2007 Dance Rocks, CTFD Gala Opening number
- 2006 The Guy in the White Shirt, Marymount Manhattan College
- 2006 Dance Break NYC, (Mystical Undines; Personals)
- 2005 Paradise Re-visited, Ballet de Monterrey, Mexico
- 2004 The Guy in the White Shirt, (workshop) National Choreography Initiative
- 2004 A Glimpse2, re-created for BalletNY
- 2004 Mega 21, Goucher College
- 2003 The Bell Witch (one-act ghost story, original music), Nashville Ballet
- 2003 Walk On, starring Mr. Wiggles, Nevada Ballet Theater
- 2002 Ghost Town, Ohio Ballet
- 2002 The Empty Cup, Martine van Hamel
- 2001 A Glimpse, Oregon Ballet Theatre
- 2001 Successful Worry, Ballet Pacifica
- 2000 Nike Nana, Pittsburgh Ballet Theater
- 1999 Blackberry Winter, Ballet Pacifica (2000 Ohio Ballet, ABT II)
- 1999 Crisis, Connecticut Ballet (Zig Zag)
- 1998 Duet, Hamptons Dance Festival
- 1998 Strings, solo for Rasta Thomas
- 1998 Kali Ma, Joffrey Ballet of Chicago
- 1997 Legends, Joffrey Ballet of Chicago
- 1995 Lilith, Ballet Omaha
- 1994 MAYA (mini-opera), Ballet de Monterrey
- 1993–1991 PARAISO, Ballet de Monterrey
- 1992 Mademoiselle de Maupin, Ballet de Monterrey
- 1991 The Gift, Alicia Alonso − National Ballet of Cuba
- 1991 Don't Look Back, Martine VanHamel/Kevin McKenzie − Jacob's Pillow Dance
- 1991 La Traviata, Mexico City Opera
- 1990 The Nutcracker, Ballet de Monterrey
- 1990 Out of Silence, National Ballet of Cuba
- 1988 Concerto for Elvis, Long Beach Ballet
- 1988 Gypsie Band, Ballet D'Angelo
- 1987 What's Real, Iowa Ballet
- 1986 Zeitgeist II, Ballet D'Angelo
- 1986 The Last of the Best, Ballet D'Angelo
- 1986 Zeitgiest 1, Ballet D'Angelo
- 1984 Next Time, New Amsterdam Ballet
- 1984 In Kazmidity, Joffrey II Dancers, Les Ballets Trockadero de Monte Carlo
- 1984 Midler Medley, Ballet D'Angelo
- 1983 Stay With Me, tour with Maya Plisetskaya
- 1982 Pavlova, CBC film; Tribute to Pavlova (stage, 1982)
