= National Choreographers Initiative =

National Choreographers Initiative (NCI) is a nonprofit dance organization founded in 2004 and based in Irvine, California, that promotes the development of choreographers from all over the United States in the professional ballet world.

== History ==
NCI hosts a three-week workshop with selected professional dancers, who have auditioned from various ballet companies throughout the United States. The choreographers each produce a work in progress, which are then showcased at the Irvine Barclay Theatre. These performances are open to the public and are held every year in late July. National Choreographers Initiative was founded in 2004 by Molly Lynch. The rehearsals and dancer accommodations are hosted by the Claire Trevor School of the Arts at the University of California, Irvine campus.

Past dancers have been from companies such as: Boston Ballet, Nevada Ballet Theatre, BalletMet, Ballet Austin, Kansas City Ballet, and Hubbard Street Dance Chicago.

=== 10th anniversary celebrations ===
In honor of NCI's 10th successful season, there were two performances at the Barclay Theatre in Irvine, California. NCI highlights will feature excerpts from works from the past decade on July 13, 2013, and NCI Discovery will showcase the work done by Fernandez, McCullough, McNamee, and Zahradnicek on July 27, 2013.

- Each year four choreographers are invited to participate in the project. 20 to 55 choreographer submissions are entered annually. NCI has worked with 37 different choreographers, including 14 women.
- 15–16 professional dancers are hired from companies throughout the United States, including BalletMet, Nashville Ballet, Sacramento Ballet, Louisville Ballet, Atlanta Ballet, Richmond Ballet, and Smuin Ballet. There have been 30 companies represented by 88 dancers who have participated. The 16 are selected from a pool of 78 dancers who auditioned and/or applied.
- 22 ballets developed at NCI have gone on to be premiered or performed by other companies: including Grand Rapids Ballet, Richmond Ballet, Smuin Ballet, Nashville Ballet, Morphoses Ballet, Hong Kong Ballet, Carolina Ballet, River North Dance Chicago, and Barak Ballet.
- Two choreographers are now artistic directors of companies: Edwaard Liang – BalletMet and Melissa Barak – Barak Ballet
- Three choreographers have participated in the project twice: Ann Marie DeAngelo, Peter Pucci, and Melissa Barak
- Four University of California, Irvine dancers have participated as apprentices in the project
- Choreographers have used their work at NCI to gain other choreographic projects
- Dancers have changed company employment based on contacts made at NCI

== Dancers ==
The 2018 NCI Dancer Cast included the following people:

=== Women ===
- Jocelyn “Josie” Green – Dayton Ballet
- Ashley Hathaway – Carolina Ballet
- Tessia “Tess” Lane – California Ballet
- Elise Pekarek – Ballet Austin
- Lauren Pschirrer – Smuin Ballet
- Maggie Rupp – Sacramento Ballet
- Sarah Joan Smith – Kansas City Ballet
- Jordan Nicole Tilton – Diablo Ballet

=== Men ===
- Anthony Cannarella – Sacramento Ballet
- Oliver Greene-Cramer – Ballet Austin
- Jonathan Harris – Sacramento Ballet
- David Hochberg – Nevada Ballet Theatre
- Isaac Jones – Dayton Ballet
- Morgan Stillman – Ballet Austin
- Maté Szentes – Richmond Ballet
- Benjamin Tucker – Nevada Ballet Theatre

== Choreographers ==
Artistic Director Molly Lynch accepts choreographer applications throughout the year, and then selects four choreographers to be participate in the annual National Choreographers Initiative.

=== 2018 ===
- Kevin Jenkins
- David Justin
- Ilya Kozadayev
- Mariana Oliviera

=== 2017 ===
- Suzanne Haag
- Robert Mills
- Penny Saunders
- Christopher Stuart

=== 2016 ===
- Tom Gold
- Nicole Haskins
- Stephanie Martinez
- Ben Needham-Wood

=== 2015 ===
- Nicolas Blanc
- Norberto De La Cruz
- Jimmy Orrante
- Sarah Tallman

=== 2014 ===
- Barry Kerollis
- Gabrielle Lamb
- Philip Neal
- Garrett Smith

=== 2013 ===
- David Fernandez
- Susan McCullough
- Kitty McNamee
- Petr Zahradnicek

=== 2012 ===
- Melissa Barak
- Thang Dao
- Darrell Grand Moultrie
- Wendy Seyb

=== 2011 ===
- Brian Enos
- Heather Maloy
- Peter Pucci
- Paula Weber

=== 2010 ===
- Ann Marie DeAngelo
- Helen Heineman
- Viktor Kabaniaev
- Peter Quanz

=== 2009 ===
- Sidra Bell
- Deanna Carter
- Rick McCullough
- Olivier Wevers of Whim W'Him

=== 2008 ===
- Amy Seiwert
- Edmund Stripe
- Emery LeCrone
- Ma Cong

=== 2007 ===
- Melissa Barak
- Frank Chaves
- Edwaard Liang
- Jerry Opdenaker

=== 2006 ===
- Ron De Jesus
- Graham Lustig
- Charles Moulton
- Gina Patterson

=== 2005 ===
- Val Caniparoli
- Christopher d'Amboise
- William Soleau
- Luca Veggetti

=== 2004 ===
- Ann Marie DeAngelo
- Peter Pucci
- James Sewell and James Sewell Ballet
- Lynne Taylor-Corbett
