= Dance Place =

Arts organization in Washington, D.C.

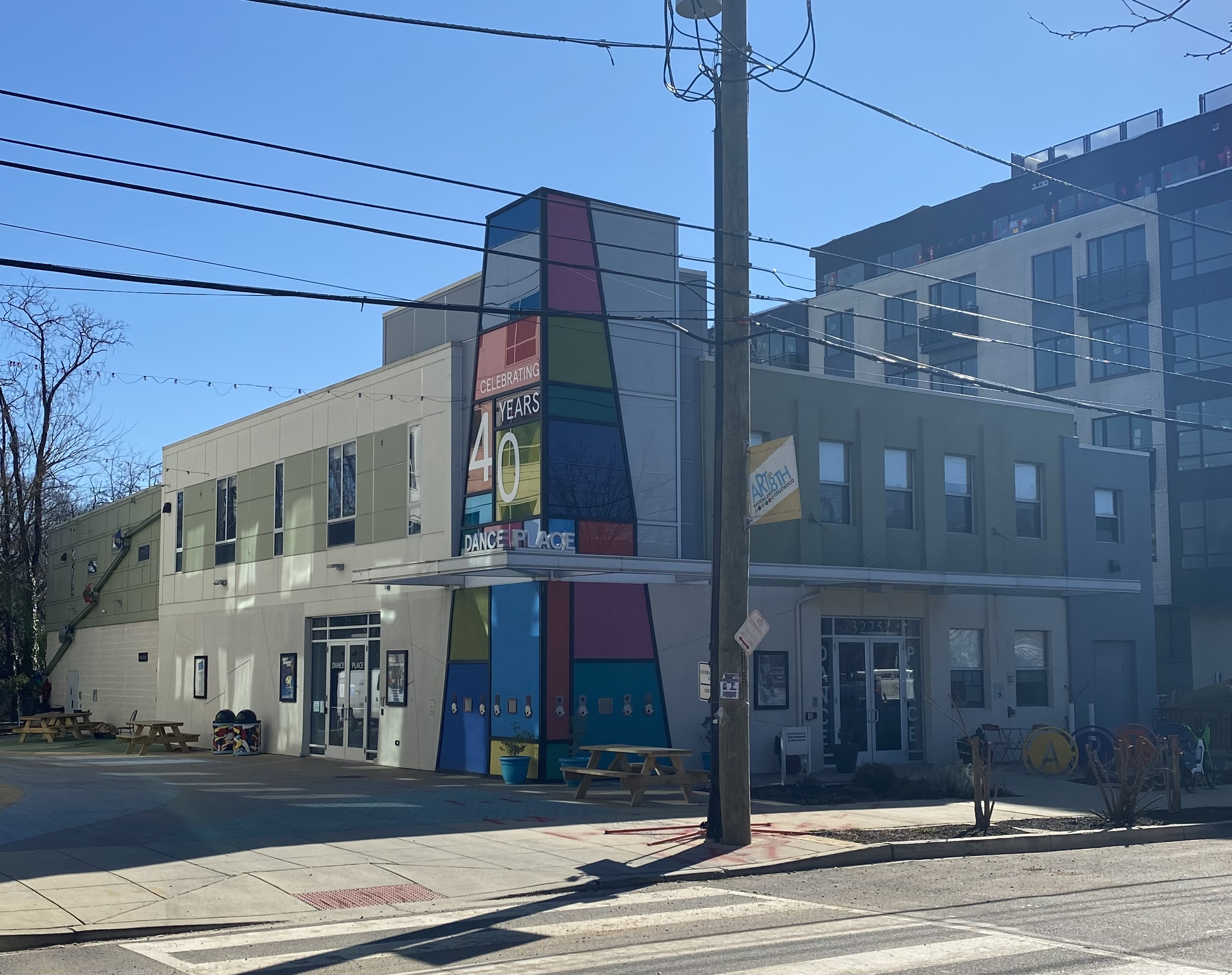
- Dance Place in 2022

- Location within Washington, D.C.
- Established: 1978
- Location: 3225 8th Street NE; Washington, D.C. 20017
- Coordinates: 38.93035°N 76.9947°W
- Type: Performance space
- Public transit access: Brookland–CUA
- Website: www.danceplace.org

Dance Place is an arts organization in the Edgewood neighborhood of Northeast Washington, D.C. The nearest metro station is Brookland/CUA on the Red Line.

== History ==
DC Wheel Productions, Inc./Dance Place was founded in 1978 as a touring educational and Performing Arts Company, which toured the public schools in the Greater DC Metropolitan area. From 1980-1985 the organization developed and operated a cultural community center called Dance Place in a rented facility located at 2424 18th Street NW, DC in the Adams Morgan neighborhood. In 1986, the organization was forced out of its Adams Morgan location due to gentrification and quadrupled rents. In order to secure the organization's future, DC Wheel purchased and renovated its permanent home located at 3225 8th Street, NE in the Edgewood neighborhood. With ownership of its own building, DC Wheel increased development of artistic and educational programs drawing many citizens and new business into its Brookland neighborhood.

In 2002, DC Wheel expanded its campus to include three rented facilities located adjacent to its main space in the Brookland Studios to serve as an additional office space, a teaching studio and a creative education center (CEC).

== Programs ==
As a "theater, school, and community resource", Dance Place's offerings include a wide variety of arts-related and community-building programs.

=== Theater ===
Dance Place's year-long performance season includes performances at their home theater in Brookland, as well as "Dance Place Around Town" performances at other Washington theaters. These performances which occur nearly every weekend of the year include

- Artist presentations both of touring companies and of local partner companies.
- Artist co-presentations mostly of local artists
- Presentations of resident companies: Carla and Company, Deborah Riley Dance Projects, and Coyaba Dance Theater.
- Festivals, presenting multiple companies, including the annual DanceAfrica DC Festival

=== School ===
Dance Place offers a variety of classes for children and adults in styles including modern, African, and hip hop. Dance Place's school is focused on training adults in modern and West African dance, and youth in creative movement. Additionally, resident company Coyaba Dance Theater runs the Coyaba Academy, an African dance training program for children.

=== Community resource ===
During the school year, Dance Place runs the Creative Education Center after school program, and over the summer Dance Place runs a Summer Camp for under-privileged youth. Dance Place also holds inreach performances in its theater for DC schools and has a Family Series of performances appropriate for children.

== Directors ==
Carla Perlo is the founder and Executive/Artistic Director of Dance Place. The Co-Director is Deborah Riley. They both worked together toward the development of Dance Place. Carla is dancer, choreographer and teacher, Ms. Perlo has had an active career for over twenty-five years. As a solo performer, artistic director of Perlo/Bloom and Company and most recently of Carla & Company, Ms. Perlo continues to teach dance and lecture at universities, colleges and community centers throughout the region including American University, George Mason University, George Washington University and Montgomery College.

== Visiting performers ==
- The Blue Man Group
- Dana Tai Soon Burgess Dance Company
- Eiko and Koma
- Philadanco
- Urban Bush Women
- Parsons Dance Company
- Tim Miller
- Rennie Harris
- PearsonWidrig DanceTheater
- Bill Shannon
- Victoria Marks
- Marc Bamuthi Joseph
- Paul Zaloom
- Elizabeth Streb
- CityDance Ensemble

== See also ==
- Theater in Washington D.C.
- List of theaters for dance
