= Zhurbin =

Zhurbin is a surname. Notable people with the surname include:

- Alexander Zhurbin (born 1945), Russian composer
- Alexander Zhurbin (born 1992), Russian tennis player
- Lev Zhurbin (born 1978), American composer and violinist
