= Orpheus and Eurydice (rock opera) =

1975 Russian rock opera by Alexander Zhurbin

Orpheus and Euridice
- Rock opera by Alexander Zhurbin
- Native title: Russian: Орфей и Эвридика (Orfey i Evridika, IPA: [ɐrˈfʲej ˈi ɪvrʲɪˈdʲikə])
- Librettist: Yuri Dimitrin
- Language: Russian
- Based on: Myth of Orpheus

Orpheus and Eurydice (Russian: Орфей и Эвридика, romanized: Orfey i Evridika, IPA: [ɐrˈfʲej ˈi ɪvrʲɪˈdʲikə]) is a 1975 rock opera album by Russian composer Alexander Zhurbin with a libretto by Yuri Dimitrin.

In 2003, the Opera was included in The Guinness Book of Records as the musical performed the greatest number of times by a single company (at the time of registration of the record, it had been performed 2350 times).

== Cast ==
The album was recorded by soviet rock band Pojuschie Gitary, and features the following performers:

- Albert Asadullin as Orpheus
- Irina Ponarovskaya as Eurydice
- Bogdan Wiwczaroski as Charon
- Olga Levitskaya as Fortune

== Track listing ==
Part 1:

1. Overture (1:37)
2. Orpheus fell in love with Eurydice... (1:09)
3. The first duet of Orpheus and Eurydice and the song of Orpheus ("When Orpheus Sings") (5:38)
4. Choir of Messengers ("It's coming, it's coming...") (1:38)
5. Farewell scene (1:25)
6. Eurydice's Aria ("The Song of the Dewdrop") (3:43)
7. Eurydice's Parting Words (0:37)
8. The First Song ("Look Around") (2:18)
9. Interlude (1:36)
10. Singers and Fortune (4:22)
11. Competition of Singers (4:26)
12. Orpheus's Performance (3:16)
13. Glorification Scene (4:34)
14. The Appearance of Fortune ("Called me, called me, my singer...") (3:05)
15. Charon's Song ("Another youngster meets spring...") (2:58)
16. Meet, Eurydice (1:06)
17. The first return of Orpheus (4:44)
18. The second song ("Forgive us, Eurydice...") (1:59)

Part 2:

1. Interlude ("Storm over the Lake") and Eurydice's song ("Orpheus, I know her by sight...") (6:00)
2. Eurydice and Charon duet (1:59)
3. Drunken Scene (4:18)
4. Aria of Fortune ("All unlucky as one...") (2:49)
5. Scene of Orpheus and Charon and Charon's song (8:32)
6. Aria of Orpheus ("I Lost Eurydice...") (3:52)
7. Parting Words of Fortune (1:39)
8. The Third Song ("Pendulum") (2:29)
9. Waiting for Orpheus (1:27)
10. Meet Eurydice (0:41)
11. Scene of the second return of Orpheus (3:13)
12. Chorus of Messengers ("It's coming, it's coming...") (2:04)
13. The Disappearance of Eurydice (1:34)
14. Finale (3:50)
