= Albert Asadullin =

Soviet-Tatar singer (born 1948)

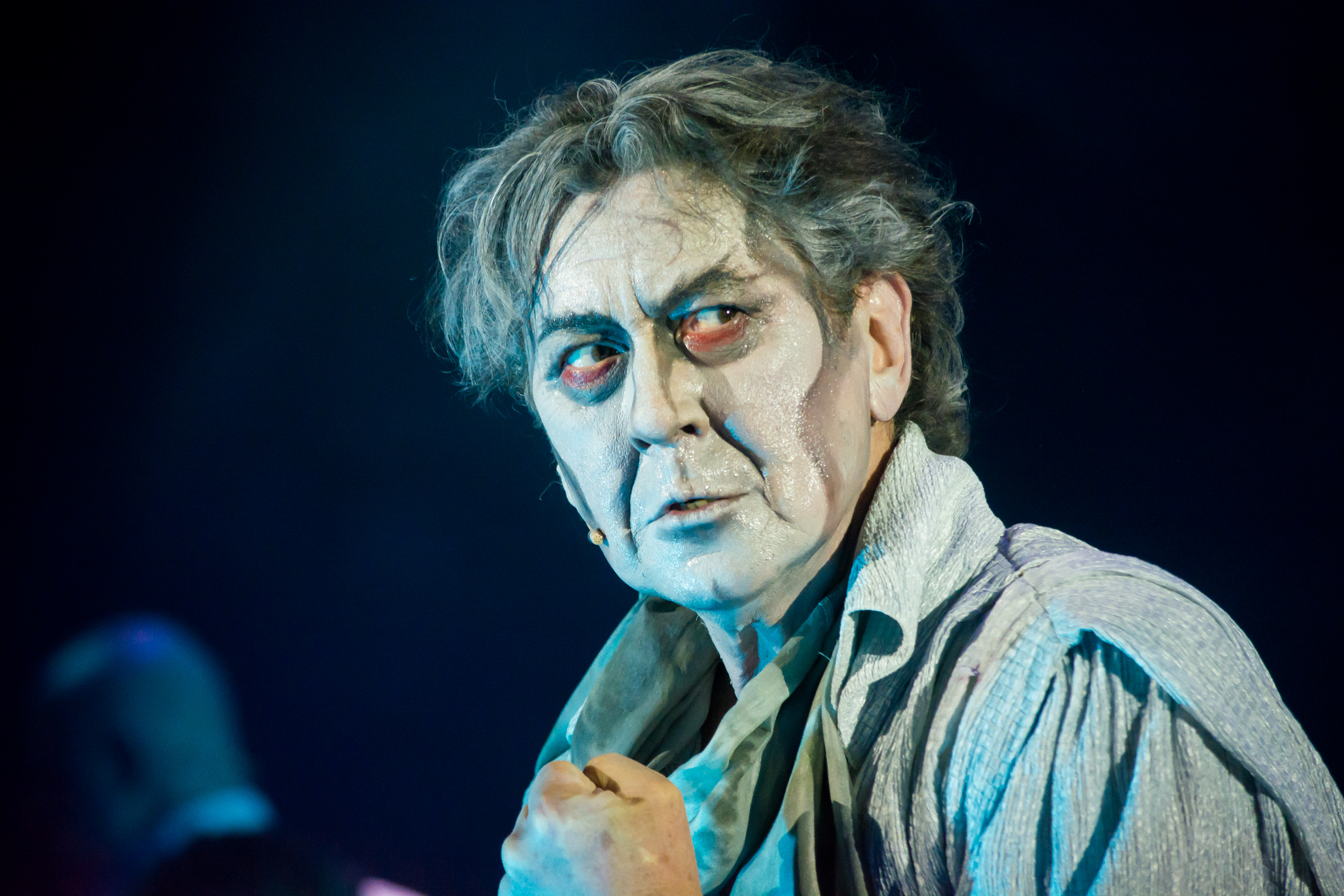

Background information
- Born: Albert Nurullovich Asadullin; September 1, 1948 (age 77); Kazan, Tatar Autonomous Soviet Socialist Republic, RSFSR, USSR
- Occupation: Singer
- Years active: 1975 — present

Albert Nurullovich Asadullin (Russian: Альберт Нуруллович Асадуллин, Tatar: Альберт Нурулла улы Әсәдуллин, romanized: Albert Nurulla ulı Əsədullin; born September 1, 1948, Kazan) is a Soviet and Russian Tatar singer, tenor altino. Honored Artist of the RSFSR (1988), People's Artist of Tatarstan (1998).

== Biography ==
He was born in Kazan in the family of an officer in retirement, a participant in the Great Patriotic War and a simple housewife. In addition to Albert, there were two older sisters in the family. One for seven years, and the other for nine years.

He studied at the Kazan Art College, then graduated from the Academy of Arts, receiving a diploma of an architect. It was in the Academy that he started singing in the amateur ensemble Ghosts. Albert Asadullin:

- It was an atmosphere all over the world: new bands, The Beatles, hippie festivals, Woodstock... The air of freedom, movement around the world. The desire to do something, to declare myself. Then we had the will of the soul and heart, the desire to simply engage in creativity.

In 1975 he decided to sing professionally. Then he received from VIA Poyushchiye Gitary an invitation to the main role in the first Soviet rock opera Orpheus and Eurydice (music by Alexander Zhurbin). His partner on the stage was Irina Ponarovskaya. Then, for five years, Asadullin with success toured in the Poyushchiye Gitary for the Soviet Union.

In 1979, Asadullin was awarded the title of laureate of the second prize at the International Competition Golden Orpheus.

In 1984, Asadullin performed his most iconic song, Doroga bez kontsa (Russian: Дорога без конца, lit. 'Endless Road').

In 2008 he voiced the main character of Ilya Maximov's animated film Little Longnose.

Currently Albert Asadullin is a soloist of the State Concert and Philharmonic Institute Petersburg-Concert and professor of the Solo Singing Department of the Institute of Music, Theater and Choreography of the Herzen University.

== Selected discography ==
- 1978 – VIA "Solntse" (EP, Melodiya С62-10957-8)
- 1980 – Orpheus and Eurydice (LP, Melodiya, C60—13833-6)
- 1981 – Ya vernus' (EP, Melodiya, С62—15849-50)
- 1987 – Vsyo eto s nami bylo (LP, Melodiya, С60—25961 006)
- 2005 – Zhemchuzhiny (CD)

== Filmography ==
Actor

- An extra day in June (1977) as Lamison
- For You (1978)
- I will tell this tale to the light now… (1981) as Ratmir

Vocal

- An extra day in June (1977)
- Leaving — go away (1978)
- The Adventures of Little Muck (1984) as Gasan
- Seven screams in the ocean (1986)
- Little Longnose (2003)
- KikoRiki (2012), "Spartakiada" episode

== Awards ==
- Honored Artist of the RSFSR (1988)
- People's Artist of the Tatarstan (1998)
