= Lev Zhurbin =

Lev 'Ljova' Zhurbin
- Lev 'Ljova' Zhurbin performing in Moscow, 2005

Background information
- Also known as: Ljova
- Born: Lev Aleksandrovich Zhurbin (Лев Александрович Журбин); August 18, 1978 (age 48)
- Origin: Moscow, Soviet Union
- Genres: Classical, folk, chamber jazz, Film Music, Gypsy, World
- Occupations: Musician, arranger, film composer, producer
- Instruments: Viola, Fadolín
- Years active: 1990–present
- Labels: Kapustnik, Sony Classical; Deutsche Grammophon, Nonesuch Records, Fat Cat
- Member of: Ljova and the Kontraband

Lev Zhurbin (born August 18, 1978, in Moscow, Soviet Union) is a composer and violist, and a champion of the fadolín.

== Biography ==
Lev Zhurbin immigrated to the United States in the year 1990. He is often credited simply as "Ljova", the diminutive of his formal name. He is the son of the composer Alexander Zhurbin and the poet/lyricist/writer Irena Ginzburg. He is the author of over 70 original compositions for classical, jazz, and folk music ensembles. He has also contributed musical scores to numerous documentaries, features, shorts and animated films.

Zhurbin received commissions from the Louisville Orchestra, the City of London Sinfonia, a string quartet for Brooklyn Rider and a commission for Yo-Yo Ma and the Silk Road Project; arrangements for the Los Angeles Philharmonic, Brooklyn Philharmonic, tenor Javier Camarena, conductor Alondra de la Parra, songwriters Natalia Lafourcade and Ricky Martin, composer/guitarist Gustavo Santaolalla, The Knights, and collaborations with choreographers Aszure Barton, Damian Woetzel, Christopher Wheeldon, Katarzyna Skarpetowska (with Parsons Dance Company), and Eduardo Vilaro (with Ballet Hispanico). In 2018, he was on the faculty of the Atelier program at Princeton University, teaching a course on collaboration with the puppeteer Basil Twist

Zhurbin released his debut solo CD, Vjola: World on Four Strings, in July 2006 on his own label, Kapustnik Records. "Mnemosyne", the debut album of his ensemble, Ljova and the Kontraband, featured Frank London, William Schimmel and other special guests. His third album, "Lost in Kino", focuses on his film music, featuring Zhurbin's cues from collaborations with films by Francis Ford Coppola, James Marsh, Robin Hessman, Josef Astor, Lev Polyakov, Roman Khrushch, Sean Gannet and Basia Winograd.

In 2012, Zhurbin released his fourth album, "Melting River", featuring music created for a dance piece by choreographer Aszure Barton. It was initially released as a download-exclusive on Bandcamp, but has since been issued on limited edition vinyl with bonus tracks.

2014 saw the release of "No Refund on Flowers", the second album by Ljova and the Kontraband, crowdfunded through a 34-second campaign on Kickstarter.

2015 and 2016 saw the releases of soundtrack albums to Zhurbin's scores for "Finding Babel" and "Datuna: Portrait of America". 2017 saw the release of "Footwork", dedicated to Zhurbin's collaborations with Parsons Dance Company and Ballet Hispanico. In 2019, he released his tenth album, "SoLò Ópus", focusing on music for the fadolín and looper effects.

During the COVID-19 pandemic, Zhurbin released a number of works for the solo fadolín through his website and social media channels. In 2022, he released two albums -- "Enter The Fadolín" (focusing on solo music for the fadolín, including music by J.S. Bach and Alexander Zhurbin, and a second collection of film scores, "Lost in Kino 2". He is presently performing and developing new repertoire with Trio Fadolín, a new chamber group featuring the violin, fadolín, and cello.

Zhurbin is married to Inna Barmash, an attorney and musician.

== Selected compositions ==
Orchestral and Soloists

- 2019 Cellostatus
- 2017 "Pulse"
- 2016 Current
- 2016 Elegy
- 2015 Throw The Book

Vocal Chamber Music

- 2013 The First Rite
- 2010 Niña Dance
- 2005 By the Campfire

Instrumental Chamber Music

- 2018 Meditation on Kol Nidrei
- 2017 Clarinet Quintet: The Refugee
- 2016 Rockaway Baby
- 2015 An Appalachian Wind
- 2014 Gi-gue-ly
- 2013 Lullaby & Memory
- 2013 Click
- 2012 String Quartet: Culai
- 2011 Everywhere is Falling Everywhere
- 2005-2008 The Vjola Suite
- 2000 Sicilienne

Music for Solo Instruments

- 2020 Voices (for piano and historical recordings), an expansion of Sirota
- 2012 Greenway (for violin)
- 2011 Sirota (for piano and cantorial recording)

Music for Dance

- 2017 Do You Like Me Now?
- 2016 Atlas Kid (co-composed with Mikael Karlsson)
- 2015 Almah
- 2014 Emin
- 2013 Hogar
- 2013 Budget Bulgar (Memphis Hora)
- 2012 Awáa (co-composed with Curtis Macdonald)
- 2009 Tales of Offenbach
- 2009 Busk
- 2004 White

== Filmography ==
Feature Film Scores

- 1999 Serpent's Breath
- 2003 Daddy
- 2006 Mother
- 2009 Black Lamb
- 2020 Alberto and the Concrete Jungle

Documentary Film Scores

- 2005 The Team
- 2007 Three Soldiers
- 2009 Alienadas
- 2010 My Perestroika
- 2011 Lost Bohemia
- 2015 Datuna: Portrait of America
- 2015 Finding Babel
- 2019 Big Lies
- 2025 Searching for Satyrus
- 2026 An Instrumental Start: A Model for the Nation

Short Film Scores

- 2003 Gardening Tips for Housewives
- 2003 Red Wagon
- 2003 The Playground
- 2005 Dinner at Marvin's
- 2007 Dear Lemon Lima
- 2007 Transience
- 2008 New People in Six Days
- 2008 Cupcake
- 2008 Only Love
- 2009 The One That I Want
- 2009 The Heart of Battle
- 2009 Spleen
- 2009 American Hero
- 2010 Dottie's Thanksgiving Pickle
- 2011 Fantastic Plastic
- 2012 For The Love of Nothing
- 2012 The Visitors
- 2013 Penny Dreadful
- 2014 6-Minute Mom
- 2014 America 1979
- 2015 Grace
- 2016 How You Look At It
- 2017 Do You Like Me Now?
- 2022 Before Dawn, Kabul Time

== Discography ==
- Vjola: World on Four Strings, 2006 Kapustnik Records
- "Mnemosyne", featuring Frank London and William Schimmel
- "Lost in Kino", (film music)
- "Melting River" 2012
- "No Refund on Flowers" 2014
- "Finding Babel" 2015
- "Datuna: Portrait of America" 2016
- "Footwork" 2017
- "SoLò Ópus" 2019
- "Enter The Fadolín" 2022
- "Lost in Kino 2" 2022
