= Vladimir Angelov =

Bulgarian-American Choreographer

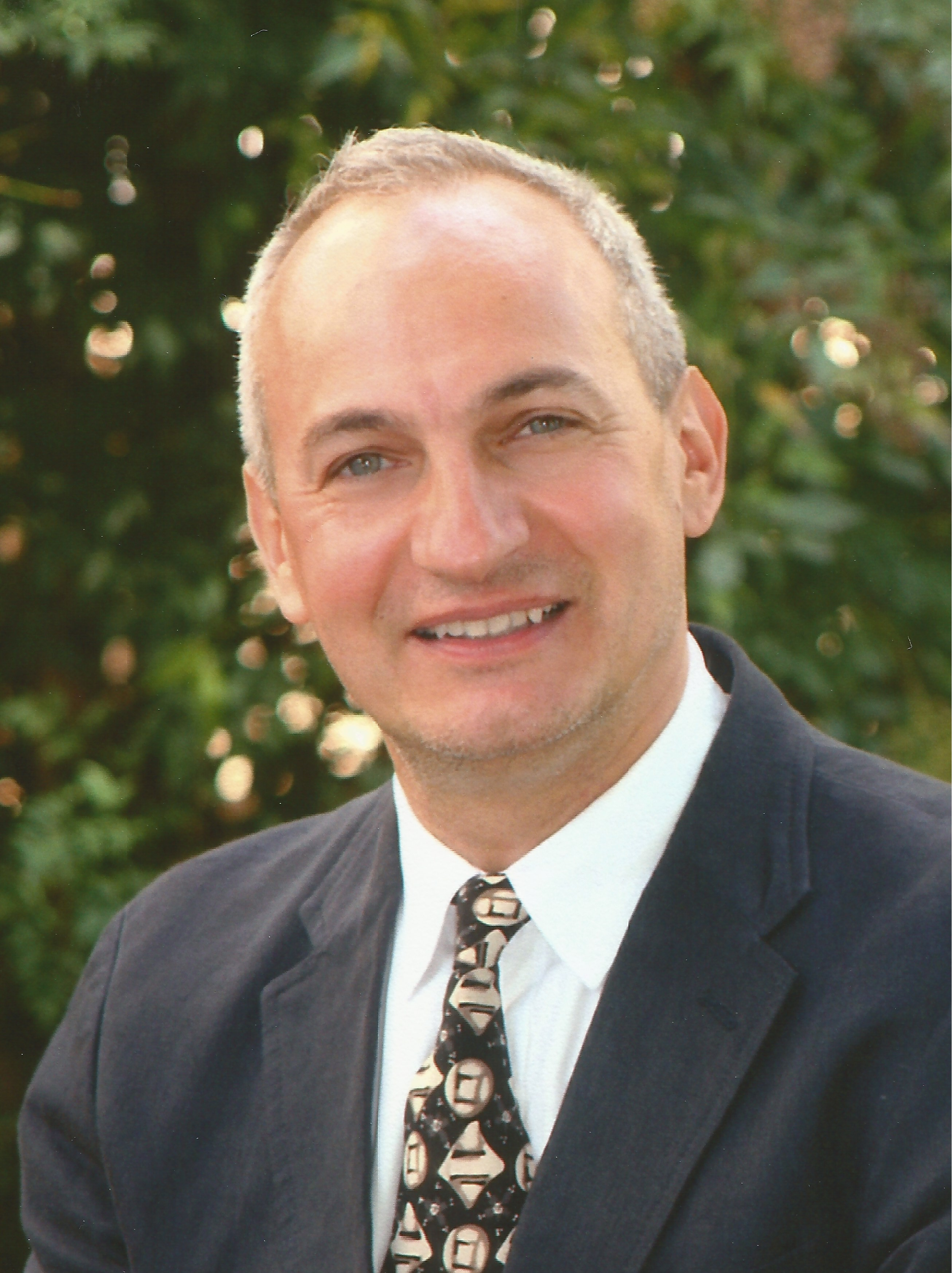
- Headshot of Vladimir Angelov, 2016
- Born: May 3, 1966 (age 60); Bulgaria
- Education: University of Sofia; American University
- Occupations: Choreographer, author, executive director
- Years active: 1986–present
- Organization: Dance ICONS Inc.
- Known for: Washington National Opera
- Website: https://danceicons.org/

Vladimir Angelov (born May 3, 1966) is a Bulgarian–American choreographer, author, and the executive director of Dance ICONS, Inc. He lives in Washington, D.C.

== Early life and career ==
Vladimir Angelov graduated from the National Choreographic School in Sofia, Bulgaria, in 1986. He first danced full-time for the national contemporary ballet company Ballet Arabesque in Sofia while studying philosophy at the University of Sofia. Angelov immigrated first to Austria and then to the US in the early 1990s. In 1996, Angelov completed his master's degree in dance and choreography at American University in Washington, D.C., under professor Dr. Naima Prevots while being directly influenced by many American groundbreaking choreographers such as Twyla Tharp, Mark Morris, Ron Brown, Dianne McIntyre, Doug Varone, Debbie Allen, and many others.

Angelov has choreographed at the Washington National Opera at the Kennedy Center in Washington, D.C., under the artistic direction of Plácido Domingo. He also choreographed for diverse musical, theater, film, and television productions. He has also frequently choreographed for the City Dance Ensemble in Washington, D.C.

Angelov has created original ballets for companies such as Arizona Ballet, Atlanta Ballet, CityDance, Indianapolis Ballet, Richmond Ballet, San Francisco Ballet, and Washington Ballet in the United States. Internationally, he has choreographed for Alberta Ballet, National Ballet of Finland, National Ballet of Mexico, Ballet Manila, Tokyo City Ballet, Mariinsky Ballet in St. Petersburg, among others. One of his frequent collaborators is Rasta Thomas, for whom he created many solo works.

== Dance ICONS ==
In 2015, Angelov founded the International Consortium for Advancement in Choreography, Inc, known as Dance ICONS (International Choreographers’ Organization and Networking Services). The organization is a global association for choreographers based in Washington, DC, USA. Since the inception of the organization, he has served as the Executive Director. Part of his work as the Executive Director of Dance ICONS includes leading a Choreographic Institute that provides professional development to emerging and early-career choreographers. The Institute is hosted in partnership with the Atlas Performing Arts Center. In his work for Dance ICONS, Angelov has interviewed and hosted Choreographic Talks with prominent choreographers and artists, such as Wendy Whelan, Brian Brooks, Ronald K. Brown, Rennie Harris, and Annabelle Lopez Ochoa, among others.

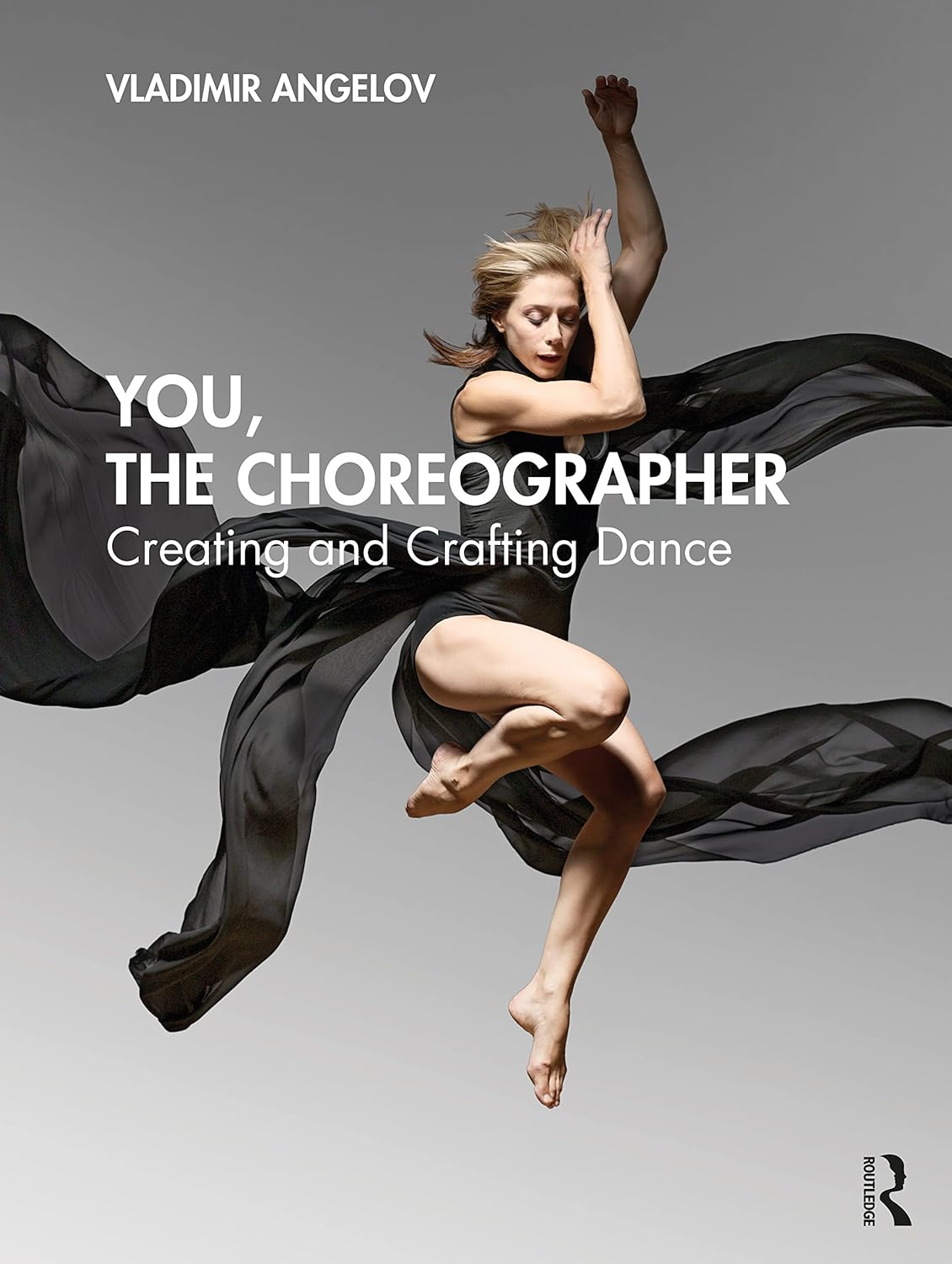
You, the Choreographer cover

== Publications ==
Between 1994 and 2008, Angelov wrote and published more than 30 articles, features, reports, performance reviews, and philosophical essays about dance in several European dance magazines, including Ballet Journal (Munich, Germany), Ballet/Tanz (Berlin, Germany), and TanzAffiche (Vienna, Austria).

In 2023, Angelov published a new book on choreography and the artistic practices of dance making, YOU, THE CHOREOGRAPHER, Creating and Crafting Dance, through Routledge/Taylor & Francis Group. The book synthesizes histories, theories, philosophies, and creative practices across diverse genres of concert dance choreography. The book is designed for choreographers at every stage of creative development, as well as readers who seek to refine their artistic sensibility.

"You, the Choreographer: Creating and Crafting Dance is a book to accompany you, the choreographer, on a creative lifetime! Systematically organized, it’s a book for good days and also for the bad days, to keep on hand to dip into when inspiration doesn’t sync with the company’s rehearsal schedule. Angelov’s book is encyclopedic in its knowledge and an indispensable guide for choreographers and those fascinated by the creation of dance." (Maggie Foyer, SeeingDance)

== Lecturing and Teaching ==
Angelov’s credits as an academic educator include regular guest teaching of advanced courses in classical ballet technique at George Washington University, as well as graduate seminars in choreographic composition at the American University in Washington, DC.

As the leader of Dance ICONS, Inc., he has conducted book presentations, lectures, masterclasses, and panel discussions at the Kennedy Center, the Delegation of the European Union, the National Gallery of Art, the Atlas Performing Arts Center, American Ballet Theatre’s Jacqueline Kennedy Onassis School, the school of the Alvin Ailey American Dance Theater, the school of the Martha Graham Dance Company, the Jacob's Pillow Dance Festival, the Philadelphia Ballet, the National Dance Education Organization, and the American College Dance Association.

Internationally, he has developed, led, and conducted intensive courses, masterclasses and professional development seminars for emerging choreographers for organizations such as HELIOS.EU at the Center for Contemporary Art, Varna International Ballet Competition and Festival, Sara-Nora-Prima Summer Academy, Beijing Dance Academy, Hong Kong Academy for the Performing Arts, Teatri Riflessi Contemporary Visions Festival in Sicily, and the National Academy of Dance in Rome, Jazzart Dance Theater at Cape Town’s Artscape Opera House, Royal Swedish Ballet, and the Royal Ballet School at Covent Garden.

== Choreographed works ==
- Nostalgia (April 1997); Rasta Thomas
- Unfolding (April 1999); Adrienne Canterna and Rasta Thomas
- Bumblebee (1999); Rasta Thomas, Bad Boys of Ballet
- Martyr (2000); Rasta Thomas, Bad Boys of Ballet
- Impetous (2000); San Francisco Ballet
- Last Horizon (2001); Mariinsky Ballet
- Prism (January 2001); CityDance
- Jinari (September 2001); CityDance
- Suite Dreams (2001); Alberta Ballet
- Deep Surface (2001); CityDance
- Bouncing Light (2002); Richmond Ballet
- SuitCase (September 2022); CityDance
- Interzone (September 2003); Indianapolis Ballet
- AXIOM (October 2003); CityDance
- tink tank (April 2004); Washington Ballet
- Torso (May 2005); Tokyo City Ballet
- Troubles in Paradise (2011) National Ballet of Mexico
- Framework (November, 2012); Dance Ethos
- CacoPhony (2017); Stara Zagora State Opera
