= Gitary =

Gitary may refer to:

- Czerwone Gitary
- Poyushchiye Gitary
