= Richmond Ballet =

Non-profit organization in the USA

Richmond Ballet, State Ballet of Virginia

General information
- Name: Richmond Ballet, State Ballet of Virginia
- Year founded: 1957
- Location: Richmond, Virginia, U.S.
- Website: www.richmondballet.com

Artistic staff
- Artistic Director: Ma Cong

Other
- Official school: School of the Richmond Ballet

Richmond Ballet is an American ballet company and 501(c)(3) organization, located in Richmond, Virginia. It was named the State Ballet of Virginia in 1990 by then Governor Douglas Wilder.

== Founding ==
In 1957, the Ballet Impromptu, founded by Robert C. Watkins Jr., Marjorie Fay Underhill, and Donna Comstock Forrest, became Richmond's first ballet company. Later, the Ballet Impromptu became the Richmond Ballet.

Richmond Ballet existed for more than twenty years as a small, civic company until 1975, when School of Richmond Ballet was created. In 1980, Stoner Winslett became the founding artistic director Richmond Ballet and developed a professional company of dancers. In 1984, Richmond Ballet became the first professional ballet company in Virginia and was designated the State Ballet of Virginia in 1990, by then Governor Wilder. Richmond Ballet's educational outreach program, Minds In Motion, was founded in 1993. It features a movement curriculum that is taught to 4th-graders across Richmond. In 2000, Richmond Ballet moved into a renovated facility in downtown Richmond.

Upon Stoner Winslett's retirement on July 1, 2024, internationally-renowned choreographer Ma Cong was named Artistic Director.

== Performances ==
In a 2011 New York Times article on American productions of Tchaikovsky's The Nutcracker, dance critic Alastair Macaulay singled out the Richmond Ballet production as one of the best in the country. The company debuted in New York City in 2005 with performances at the Joyce Theater. In October 2013, during the company's 30th season, the Ballet premiered the contemporary work "Phoenix Rising", choreographed by Philip Neal, a former student of School of Richmond Ballet and dancer for 23 years with New York City Ballet. Richmond Ballet returned to The Joyce Theater in April 2007 as part of a tribute to American master choreographer John Butler, and again in 2010.

In 2012, Richmond Ballet made its international debut when they traveled to London where they performed in the Linbury Theatre at the Royal Opera House. In 2015, Richmond Ballet embarked on a tour of China. While in China, they performed at the "Meet in Beijing" Arts Festival at the National Centre for the Performing Arts. They also performed in the cities of Jinan, Dezhou, and Shanghai. The Ballet toured to Wolf Trap National Park for the Performing Arts in August 2023.

In a typical season, Richmond Ballet presents repertory productions and story ballets, including Stoner Winslett's The Nutcracker to Richmond audiences. They currently perform their Studio Series productions at their Studio Theatre in downtown Richmond and their mainstage productions at Dominion Energy Center.

== Commissioned works ==
Richmond Ballet has commissioned many ballets from choreographers, including:

- ...as an old shirt, Todd Rosenlieb (2008)
- Always, at the Edge of Never, Colin Connor (2010)
- Ancient Airs & Dances, Stoner Winslett (1986)
- Astormix, Philip Neal (2001)
- Attention, Please, Val Caniparoli (1999)
- At the Edge of Thira, Chris Burnside (1997)
- Avalon, Stoner Winslett (1995)
- Between the Lines, Alan Hineline (2004)
- Bouncing Light, Vladimir Angelov (2002)
- Bow Out, Val Caniparoli (1995)
- Chasing Cello, William Soleau (2013)
- Cinderella, Malcolm Burn (2000)
- City Life, Mark Annear (2016)
- Closing Doors, William Soleau (2002)
- Complete Trust, Malcolm Burn (1997)
- Dark Hugs Me Hard, Susan Shields (2006)
- Djangology, Val Caniparoli (1997)
- Echoing Past (Das alte Jahr), Stoner Winslett (1996)
- Ershter Vals, Ma Cong (2009/10)
- Estampie, Miriam Mahdaviani (1995)
- Faces, Malcolm Burn (2003)
- Gargoyles, Philip Neal (2012)
- The Howling Cat (Imaginary Tango), Kirk Peterson (2001)
- Hymn, William Soleau (1990)
- Inconsequentials, Agnes de Mille (1981)
- Into The Air, Colin Connor (2005)
- iNVERSION, Darrell Moultrie (2014)
- La Belle Danse, Jessica Lang (2007)
- Lift The Fallen, Ma Cong (2014)
- Lines Squared, Jessica Lang (2009)
- Luminitza, Ma Cong (2012)
- A Maiden's Hymn, Jessica Lang (2003)
- Mephisto Walz, Philip Neal (2002)
- Misa Criolla, William Soleau (2008)
- Now and Then, Mauricio Wainrot (1999)
- Nuevo Tango, William Soleau (1998)
- The Nutcracker, Stoner Winslett (1984)
- Octavo, Gina Patterson (2011)
- Orchestra, Stoner Winslett (1985)
- Other Places, Stoner Winslett (1990)
- Phoenix Rising, Philip Neal (2013)
- Realms of Amber, Edgar Zendejas (2016)
- Setting Sun, Chris Burnside (1994)
- Silence, Gina Patterson (2008/09)
- Solace, Philip Neal (2002)
- Sojourn, Stoner Winslett (1988)
- Stolen Moments, Val Caniparoli (2015)
- Streets & Legends, Colin Connor (1997)
- String Sketches, William Soleau (1996)
- Surfside, Michael John Lowe (2002)
- Swipe, Val Caniparoli (2011)
- Tandem Spaces, William Soleau (1994)
- Terra, Colin Connor (1996)
- To Familiar Spaces in Dream, Jessica Lang (2005)
- A Tribute (To Marcel Marceau & Bip), Malcolm Burn (2008/11)
- Triumph of Spring, Stoner Winslett (1988)
- Vestiges, Colin Conor (2000)
- Ciolin, Val Caniparoli (2006)
- Vortex, Kirk Peterson (1999)
- Voyages, Mauricio Wainrot (2008)

New Work Festival Pieces

- All Something and Light, Julie Job-Smithson (2009)
- Chance Favors the Prepared Mind, Todd Rosenlieb (2008)
- Diversions, James Frazier (2009)
- Dominant Curves, Sasha Janes (2013)
- The Edge Of Place, Amy Seiwert (2013)
- Eos Chasma, Melissa Barak (2014)
- Exulto, Peter Quanz (2014)
- From My Life, Nicole Haskins (2015)
- Inventory, Matthew Frain (2015)
- Lenton Rose, Rex Wheeler (2015)
- Morning Overtures, Patti D’Beck & David Leong (2008)
- Ninfee, Jacqulyn Buglisi (2009)
- Polaris, Katarzyna Skarpetowska (2015)
- Reiffe, Edgar Zendejas (2014)
- Saideira, Darrell Moultrie (2013)
- Shadows On The Inside, Gavin Stewart (2014)
- Touched, Viktor Plotnikov (2008)
- Vanish, Starrene Foster (2013)
- Y Por Ti, Eloy Barragan (2008)

== School of Richmond Ballet ==
The School of Richmond Ballet was founded in 1975. They train students aged four years old and above in ballet, with supplemental education in character dance, modern dance, and theatre dance.
