= Rasta Thomas =

American ballet dancer (born 1981)

- Born: Rasta Kuzma Ramacandra; July 18, 1981 (age 45); San Francisco, California, U.S.
- Career
- Current group: Bad Boys of Dance
- Dances: Ballet

Rasta Kuzma Ramacandra (born July 18, 1981), known professionally as Rasta Thomas, is an American dancer, choreographer, and founder of the dance company Bad Boys of Dance.

== Early life ==
Rasta Thomas was born in San Francisco, California, and raised in Riyadh, Saudi Arabia. His parents were physicians whose frequent travel, according to Thomas in a 1998 interview with The Christian Science Monitor, led him to be "more open-minded about movement and about what people have to offer."

At age two, Thomas underwent physical therapy following a leg injury sustained in a vehicle accident. He began taekwondo lessons at age three. His father later enrolled him in ballet classes as a disciplinary measure following behavioural issues.

== Career ==
At age 12, Thomas trained at the Kirov Academy of Ballet in Washington, D.C. While a student at the Kirov, he represented the Seiskaya School of Ballet at the 1996 Varna International Ballet Competition. During this time, his training and performance were sponsored by Gerald Arpino, Arthur Mitchell, and Debbie Allen.

At age 13, Thomas trained under Dawei Zhang at the Maryland Youth Ballet. In 1994, he received the Jury Prize at the Paris International Dance Competition, becoming the youngest recipient in the competition's history. In 1995, he joined Le Jeune Ballet de France and later performed as an étoile (leading dancer) at the Paris Opera Ballet.

In 1996, at age 15, Thomas was awarded the Junior Gold Medal at the International Ballet Competition in Varna, Bulgaria, while performing with a foot injury. In 1997, he joined the Hartford Ballet as a company artist.

In 1998, Thomas competed in the senior division of the USA International Ballet Competition (USAIBC) at age 17. He won the gold medal, becoming the youngest dancer to do so in that division.

Thomas moved to Los Angeles to pursue commercial work, which included a GAP ad and a performance in the 1999 Academy Awards choreographed by Debbie Allen. Thomas also conceived and directed Homage: A Tribute to Families With AIDS, a benefit performance for Self-Help Community Services and its Family Home Care program.

I'll contact the artistic director and try to sell myself to them for a particular role. Some dance companies resist because it affects morale with their established dancers ... I'm aware that it is important not to upset the balance of an existing company and not to give the impression that I am irresponsible or a drifter.

— Rasta Thomas, The Dancer Within (2008)

Thomas moved to New York City and joined the Dance Theatre of Harlem under the direction of Arthur Mitchell. in February 2001, following an introduction by choreographer Vladimir Angelov to Gerhard Rieder, Thomas performed at the Kirov Ballet's gala in St. Petersburg, dancing Angelov's Flight of the Bumblebee. In October 2001, after filming the movie Without a Word, he became the first American to join the Kirov Ballet as a permanent member.

Thomas later performed as a guest artist with the American Ballet Theatre in Lar Lubovitch's production of Othello. In 2005, he performed a solo in the U.S. debut of Lubovitch’s Elemental Brubeck. That same year, he made his Broadway debut in the lead role of Eddie in the musical Movin' Out, later joining the productions' touring company.

In 2007, Thomas founded the dance company Bad Boys of Dance (BBD), which debuted at the Jacob's Pillow Dance Festival in July of that year. Reviewing an early performance for The New York Times, Jennifer Dunning called it "the dance equivalent of a water-bomb gang," nothing Thomas's "theatrical intelligence" and describing the performers as a group of friends "with individual presences" A review in The Guardian characterised the production as having "a touch of classical class."

== Personal life ==
Thomas has one daughter from his marriage to his former dance partner, Adrienne Canterna.

== Reviews ==
- NY Times by Jennifer Dunning, July 31, 2007
- NY Times by Roslyn Sulcas, December 16, 2009
