= Katarzyna Skarpetowska =

Katarzyna Skarpetowska (born ca. 1977) is a dancer and choreographer of Polish descent. She danced with the Lar Lubovitch Dance Company from 2007 - 2014, and Parsons Dance Company. from 1999-2006. Her choreography, often set on the Parsons company, is noted for providing a more emotionally complicated contrast to Parson's work.

She performed in the Broadway musical METRO at age 15 directed by Janusz Józefowicz. Following the show's run, she attended NYC High School for the Performing Arts and then received a BFA in Dance from The Juilliard School in 1999 under artistic director Benjamin Harkarvy. After graduation, she joined Parsons Dance, performing leading roles in the company’s repertory including the iconic CAUGHT. With the Lar Lubovitch Dance Company, Katarzyna performed at many reputable venues such as New York’s City Center, The Kennedy Center and The Bolshoi Theater, and was a guest artist with The Battleworks Dance Company and Buglisi Dance Theater. Her choreography has been performed by Richmond Ballet, Alvin Ailey American Dance Theater II, Lar Lubovitch Dance Company, Parsons Dance, Buglisi Dance Theater, Houston Metropolitan Dance Company, Hubbard Street 2, among others.

She was named one of Dance Magazine's "25 to Watch" in 2016.

She lives in New York City.
