= Career Transition For Dancers =

U.S. nonprofit organization

Career Transition For Dancers was invented in 1985. It has 4,600 active dancer-clients and has helped dancers in 47 states with their transitions through mobile National Outreach Projects.

== History ==
In 1982, several foundations and unions including the National Endowment for the Arts, the AFL-CIO Labor Institute for Human Enrichment, and the Actors' Equity Association (led by Agnes de Mille) granted funding for a conference to discuss the need to assist dancers both during and at the end of their careers.

The conference took place on June 8, 1982, where leaders agreed that it was critical for dancers to begin exploring alternative careers at the beginning of their dance training and performing careers.

In 1985, the nonprofit organization Career Transition For Dancers, Inc. was established in New York City with money from Actors' Equity Association, the American Federation of Television and Radio Artists, American Guild of Musical Artists, and the Screen Actors Guild. Career Transition For Dancers is the only organization in the United States dedicated solely to the enrichment of dancers' post-performing years.

=== Caroline Newhouse ===
Caroline Newhouse (1910–2003), an artist and arts philanthropist, served on the Board of Career Transition For Dancers as Director Emerita, establishing The Caroline H. Newhouse Scholarship Fund as well as The Caroline & Theodore Newhouse Center for Dancers with an endowed gift of $1 million during her tenure. Newhouse, an artist herself, always felt a special bond with dancers, who often served as models for her artwork. "While you sculpt, you talk, and they told me how hard they have to work in order to perform," she said. Newhouse declared that "There is no time for them to do anything except dance, dance, dance. And at 29, the body doesn't react anymore as it did when you were 19." Newhouse's love for dance was also shared by her husband, Theodore Newhouse, who helped establish the Newhouse communications company. The company owns Condé-Nast Publications, which has been a long-time supporter of the organization and is currently one of the organization's annual gala underwriters, along with the Samuel I. Newhouse Foundation.

=== Cynthia Gregory ===
Prima ballerina Cynthia Gregory was the initial chairman of the board of the organization through 2015 and now serves as its chairman emeritus.

== Mission ==
The mission of Career Transition For Dancers is to enable dancers to define their career possibilities and develop the skills necessary to excel in a variety of disciplines.

== Locations ==
The organization is based in New York City, where the first office opened in 1985. A second branch opened in Los Angeles in 1995, and a third was established in Chicago in 2008. In addition, the organization maintains a national reach through annual National Outreach Projects in various cities throughout the United States. It is also an international organization in some countries.

== International affiliations ==
Career Transition For Dancers is a member of the International Organization for the Transition of Professional Dancers. Other organizations in the international organization include Dancer Transition Resource Centre (Canada), Dancers' Career Development (UK), Association Suisse Pour la Reconversion des Danseurs Professionnels (Switzerland).

== Programs ==
=== Career Counseling ===
Career counseling is offered in-person through the organization's three offices, over the internet, and by phone. These methods have provided more than 4,600 dancers in 47 states with approximately 46,000 hours of career counseling.

The organization offers one-on-one career counseling, informative Career Conversation seminars on relevant topics of interest, and focus and support groups such as the Business Group (for dancer-entrepreneurs) and the Diamond Group (for mature dancers).

National Outreach Projects provide counseling and seminars for two days in various locations throughout the nation each year. Workshops examine the key components of career transition, from defining interests and skills to understanding the emotional aspects of change. Individual career counseling sessions are also offered after the workshops. To date, the organization has toured over 30 locations around the country.

=== Grants and Scholarships ===
Career Transition For Dancers provides grants and educational scholarships that allow dancers to go back to school or start new businesses. Over $4 million has been awarded for educational scholarships towards tuition, books, and related expenses since 1985. Over $400,000 has been awarded to entrepreneurial dancers.

== Resources ==
Each of the organization's offices have a computer lab and resource center that are open to all dancers. Resource center materials include self-help manuals, college guides, a job bank, and various publications relevant to working dancers pursuing career development.

== Notable "alumni" ==
Jock Soto, former principal dancer with the New York City Ballet, received a grant from the organization to attend culinary school after retiring, and wrote a cookbook with his former dance partner, Heather Watts. He now teaches at the School of American Ballet and manages a catering events company called Lucky Basset Events.

== Merger with The Actors Fund ==
On September 21, 2015, the organization announced that it would merge with The Actors Fund of America. The former activities of the organization will thereafter be carried on as an operation of The Actors Fund.
