= Cynthia Gregory =

American former prima ballerina (born 1946)

Cynthia Kathleen Gregory (born July 8, 1946) is an American former prima ballerina.

== Career ==
Born in Los Angeles, Gregory took up dancing when she was five, with the encouragement of her parents, who hoped exercise would stem her history of childhood illnesses. A performance by Margot Fonteyn and Rudolf Nureyev had inspired young Cynthia to study ballet. By age six, she was en pointe; and at age seven, she first appeared on the cover of Dance Magazine. She would eventually go on to dance with Nureyev in a production of Romeo and Juliet, which he had originated with Fonteyn as Juliet. He has called Gregory "America's Prima ballerina assoluta."

Much of Gregory’s early training was with Carmelita Maracci. Awarded a Ford Foundation scholarship at age 14 to study with the San Francisco Ballet, she quickly rose to soloist and became shortly thereafter a principal dancer, while also dancing with the San Francisco Opera.

Living now in New York at the Rehearsal Club, Gregory joined American Ballet Theatre (ABT) in 1965. In 1967, when ABT was on tour in San Francisco, Gregory made an auspicious debut as Odette-Odile in Swan Lake. Her New York debut in that role later the same year marked her emergence as a major ballerina. The role is one in which her performance is still recognized as definitive.

Gregory’s other lead roles include classical performances in Giselle, Sleeping Beauty, Coppélia, Don Quixote, La Sylphide, as well as contemporary works including The Eternal Idol and At Midnight. At ABT alone, Gregory danced in over eighty works, including over a dozen created for her.

In 1986, Gregory was chosen to open the newly refurbished Paramount Theater in Wilkes-Barre, Pennsylvania, when it became the F.M. Kirby Center for the Performing Arts.

Gregory resigned from ABT in 1991 to pursue a more varied repertoire. She continued to perform as a permanent guest artist with Cleveland San Jose Ballet, Dances...Patrelle and Connecticut Ballet Theatre until ending her public performances in 1992.

Her career included guest performances with leading dance companies of the world, including National Ballet of Canada, Zurich Ballet, San Francisco Ballet, Vienna State Opera Ballet, Ballet Nacional de Cuba, and Stuttgart Ballet. She also appeared with Linda Ronstadt in Ronstadt’s music video of “When You Wish Upon a Star.”

Gregory presently stages classical ballets, coaches and gives master dance classes for dance companies around the world. Her choreographic works include her solo to Bach’s “Air on the G String,” as well as a two-minute rock video for Campbell's Soup. She has been featured in advertising campaigns for American Express (“Do you know me? You know my toes!”), Raytheon, and Rolex.

Gregory served as Chairman of the Board of Career Transition For Dancers (a not-for-profit organization that provides career counseling, scholarships and other vital services to dancers who, for reasons of age or injury, are making a career change) from 1991 to 2015, when Career Transition For Dancers merged with the Actors Fund of America.

Since 2008, Gregory has been a member of the board of directors of the Isadora Duncan Dance Foundation, a non-profit organization dedicated to extending the dream, dance legacy and spirit of Isadora Duncan.

In September 2010, Nevada Ballet Theatre appointed Gregory as an artistic advisor. The Cynthia Gregory Center for Coaching was established at the company's Las Vegas studios.

== Honors ==
Gregory was the recipient of the 1975 Dance Magazine Award, honoring her dedication to, and enrichment of, the art of dance. In 1978 she received the Harkness Ballet’s first annual Dance Award. She is the only two-time recipient annual awards from Dance Educators of America (1981 and 1988). In 1988, the now-defunct magazine New York Woman gave Gregory its first “Showstopper of the Year” award. The New York Public Library designated her a “Lion of the Performing Arts” in 1989. She received the lifetime-achievement Certificate of Merit from the National Arts Club in 1991. Hofstra University awarded Gregory an honorary Doctor of Humane Letters degree in 1993, and she received an honorary doctorate from State University of New York–Purchase College in 1995.

== Personal life ==
Gregory is the daughter of Konstantin (a dress manufacturer) and Marcelle Tremblay Gregory. She married Terrence S. Orr (a fellow dancer with American Ballet Theatre) in 1966; they were divorced in 1975. She married John Hemminger (a rock music manager and promoter) in 1976; he died in 1984. She married attorney Hilary B. Miller in 1985; they were divorced in 2008. Her children are a stepdaughter, Amanda Christine Miller, and a son, Lloyd Gregory Miller (died 2017).

Gregory is the author of Ballet is the Best Exercise. Her children’s book, Cynthia Gregory Dances Swan Lake, was published in October 1990.

Gregory devotes free time to interpreting her most memorable roles through pen-and-ink and watercolor drawings. Her work has been shown at the gallery at Lincoln Center, the annual art shows of Greenwich and Rowayton, Connecticut, at private art galleries, and on dance posters and CD covers.

== Sources ==
- Film Reference.com
