= PearsonWidrig DanceTheater =

Sara Pearson and Patrik Widrig's PearsonWidrig DanceTheater was formed in 1987 in New York City. Their work has been produced by the city's major dance venues including Lincoln Center, the Joyce Theater, the City Center Fall for Dance Festival, DTW, The Kitchen, Central Park SummerStage, P.S. 122, The 92nd Street Y Harkness Dance Project, and Dancing in the Streets. They have received foundation support from the NEA, NYSCA, and NPN, and the Rockefeller, Altria, Harkness, Jerome, Joyce Mertz-Gilmore, Puffin, Swiss Center and Sequoia foundations, as well as the Asian Cultural Council and Arts International. Video specials featuring their work have appeared on the national television networks of India, South Korea, Mexico and Greece.

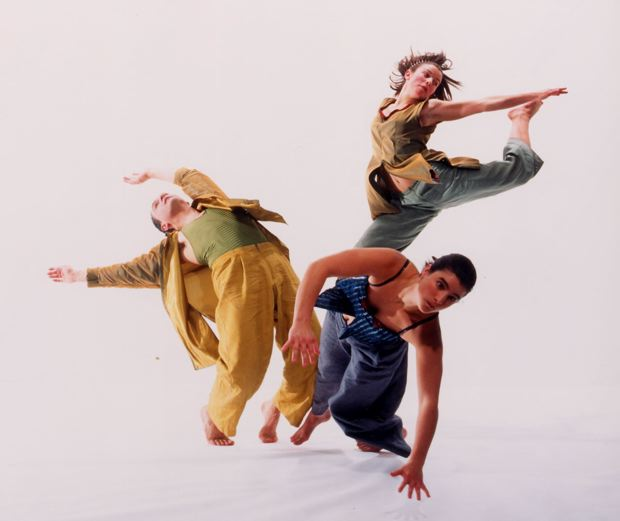
PearsonWidrig DanceTheater in "Hereafter"

Their best-known work is "Ordinary Festivals", which has been seen by over 18,000 people on three continents. The New York Times called it "most amazing! most enjoyable!" The company employs dance, text, and video to explore ideas such as the socio-political—in "Katrina, Katrina: Love Letters to New Orleans" (“Heart-wrenching and wryly comic” [The Washington Post]), the poetic—in "Thaw" (“Carries enough everyday magic for several productions”—Eva Yaa Asantewaa), and the mystical piece "The Return of Lot’s Wife" ("unfolds with the pulsating rhythm of a carefully crafted poem" [The Daily Gazette, Schenectady, New York]).

They also do site-specific projects and community dance/theater/video installations. This site work has featured rowboats in Central Park, the Great Lawn at Jacob's Pillow, the Eiun-In Buddhist temple in Kyoto, the modern architecture of I. M. Pei’s Portland Museum of Art, and Wave Hill, the bucolic estate in the Bronx. Their most recent site-adaptive work, "Paradise Pond", premiered on and around the campus pond at Bates College and involved over 100 festival dancers, community participants, and musicians. The work marks the fourth major collaboration with Obie and Bessie Award-winning composer Robert Een.

Their biggest site-adaptive work, "A Curious Invasion" at Wave Hill, featured 88 performers, 24 haystacks, 10 fans, 5 sprinklers, 4 TV/VCR’s, and 2,000 ice cubes. Elizabeth Zimmer of The Village Voice wrote, "In over a decade of watching Wave Hill events, I’ve never had such a good time. It really was perfect." The piece has also been performed at Gilsland Farm Audubon Sanctuary, Falmouth, Maine, in 1997, commissioned by the Bates Dance Festival; Wave Hill, Bronx, New York in 2001, co-commissioned by Dancing in the Streets and Wave Hill; Dartmouth College, commissioned by the Hopkins Center, Hanover, New Hampshire, in 2003.

They have also collaborated with composers on work which included music created and performed live by Robert Een, Andy Teirstein, Philip Hamilton, Carman Moore, and Carter Burwell, who created "one of the finest scores for modern dance" (Back Stage) for "The Return of Lot’s Wife".

In 2007–08, they brought "Katrina, Katrina: Love Letters to New Orleans" to Washington DC, New Orleans, Saratoga Springs, and Atlanta. They also developed a new company/concert stage work "Sayonara, Martha", and created the site-specific performance project "Paradise Pond" in celebration of the Bates Dance Festival’s 25th anniversary, with original music by Robert Een. The year included a New York performance season at the Thalia at Symphony Space, a choreographic residency with the Pacific Northwest Ballet in Seattle; and creative residencies in Switzerland, India, and upstate New York.

In August 2009, Pearson and Widrig joined the Dance faculty at the University of Maryland, College Park, where they teach choreography and performance. Their 2010 schedule included a 12-performance, 8-venue tour of "Unmoored: Love Letters to New Orleans" featuring the Pearson-Widrig Dance Theater and 12 University of Maryland dancers. In May 2011 they are teaching choreography in China at Beijing Normal University.

In 2014, PearsonWidrig DanceTheater traveled to St. Petersburg, Russia, for a two-week residency and performances at the OPEN LOOK Festival. In 2016, PearsonWidrig DanceTheater traveled to Cuba. They engaged in two weeks of cultural exchange, collaborating with the Rosario Cárdenas Dance Company and Cuban dancers and musicians on a new site-specific performance in Old Havana. They also taught free workshops open to the public, and offering a free concert of our choreography and PWDT dance artists Tzveta Kassabova, Lindsay Gilmour, Graham Brown, and apprentice Jonathan Hsu.
