= Charles Moulton (choreographer) =

American choreographer and visual artist (born 1954)

- Born: July 13, 1954 (age 72)

Charles Moulton (born July 13, 1954) is an American choreographer and visual artist who has staged dances on Mikhail Baryshnikov’s White Oak Project, The Joffrey Ballet, The Lar Lubovitch Dance Company, The Ohio Ballet, Oregon Ballet Theater, Gauthier Dance (Stuttgart), and many other companies in the US and abroad. He is a Guggenheim Award winner, a Dorothy Chandler Arts Achievement winner and a co-founding director of Performance Space 122 in downtown Manhattan. He is currently co-artistic director of Garrett + Moulton Productions, a San Francisco based performing arts organization that presents live dance and music. Moulton has received numerous awards and fellowships including three Jerome Foundation awards and three Meet The Composer/Choreographer awards. He has received support from the NEA, The New York State Arts Council, the Foundation for Contemporary Performing Arts, the Con Edison Foundation, The Beards Fund, Warner Communications, The National Arts Center of Canada, The Zellerbach Fund, and the Mary Flagler Cary Charitable Trust.

== Early career ==
Moulton began his professional career as a dancer in 1972 with Contemporary Dancers Canada in Winnipeg, Manitoba. In 1973 he moved to New York to join the Merce Cunningham Dance Company where he danced from 1973-76. Moulton created his own company in 1978, which toured nationally and internationally for ten years. He created a wide variety of works in collaboration with designers Charles Atlas and Frank Moore, and composers Dick Connette, Scott Johnson, Bill Obrecht, Steve Elson and Lenny Pickett.

A virtuoso tap dancer, Moulton studied under Charles “Cookie” Cook and Honi Coles. In 1975 he created a tap solo “300 300 300 / 1400” which was shown at the Paula Cooper Gallery and in the Public Arts International/Free Speech festival. In 1986 he created “Tapnology,” called by the New York Times “One of the Ten Best Dance Events of The Year,” in which microphones attached to his shoes transmitted signals that triggered a variety of midi sounds and noises. He toured this work extensively through the United States.

Tapnology, 1986, Darcy Chang

== Precision Ball Passing ==
Moulton is best known for his work “Precision Ball Passing,” which has been heralded as a landmark in the development of post-modern dance. Originally created for three performers in 1979, additional versions have been made for nine, 18, 25, 48, 60 and 72 performers. Precision Ball Passing has been performed around the world on a wide variety of dance companies, schools.

== Commercial choreography ==
Moulton is an active commercial choreographer. He choreographed Peter Gabriel’s “So” Tour and created a featured solo for Academy Award winner Tilda Swinton in the movie "Teknolust." He choreographed over 1000 dancers for the temple/rave scene in “The Matrix Reloaded” and an advertising campaign for Peregrine Communications. He has collaborated on two large-scale projects in China with director Daniel Flannery, “Elements”(2008) and “Illusions”(2013).

== Visual art ==
In 2000, Moulton was a fellow at the Djerassi Resident Artists Program where he became interested in making drawings. His visual art has been shown at the Pro Arts Gallery, Oakopolis Gallery, and the Terminal Gallery, all in Oakland, CA, and at the Center for Creative Photography in Tucson, AZ. His drawings served as the basis for “A Show of Hands,” created in collaboration with Janice Garrett.

Devil Eating Man, Ink on Paper, 2015

== Current work ==
Moulton lives in Oakland, CA, with his life partner and choreographic collaborator, Janice Garrett. Since 2007 they have created six full-length dance theater pieces together: Stringwreck (2008), The Illustrated Book of Invisible Stories (2009), The Experience of Flight in Dreams (2011), Angles of Enchantment (2012), A Show of Hands (2013), and The Luminous Edge (2014). Of their most recent work, “The Luminous Edge”, SF Chronicle wrote: The dance season is still very young, but it is doubtful whether we will see anything quite as exhilarating … as Garrett + Moulton Productions’ “The Luminous Edge”.
