= Poyushchiye Gitary =

Soviet rock group

Pojuschie Gitary (Russian: Поющие гитары [pɐˈjʉɕːɪɪ ɡʲɪˈtarɨ], The Singing Guitars) are a Russian band. They were the Soviet Union's first rock band to reach a phenomenal rate of success and popularity in the Soviet Union, Eastern Europe and in other countries.

The band was founded in 1966 in Petersburg by Vladimir Vasilyev - (guitar, vocal) and Evgeny Bronevitsky (vocal, bass guitar) and other pro-western Russian musicians. Initially inspired by the music of The Beatles and other bands of the 1960s the band also played in a manner not that different from Hungary's Illés and Poland's Czerwone Gitary, whose name means "Red Guitars".

In the course of their career spanning almost 60 years, Pojuschie Gitary are often nicknamed "the Soviet Beatles"

Lineup in 2023:

- Evgeny Bronevitsky - vocal, bass guitar
- Milena Vavilova - lead vocal
- Vladimir Vasilyev - guitar, vocal
- Vasily Borisov - guitar, vocal
- Valery Kocheguro - guitar, vocal
- Vladimir Savenok - keyboards, vocal
- Michael Soytu - drums

Past members included: Yuriy Antonov, Irina Ponarovskaya, Albert Asadullin and other musicians
