= Alexander Zhurbin =

Russian composer

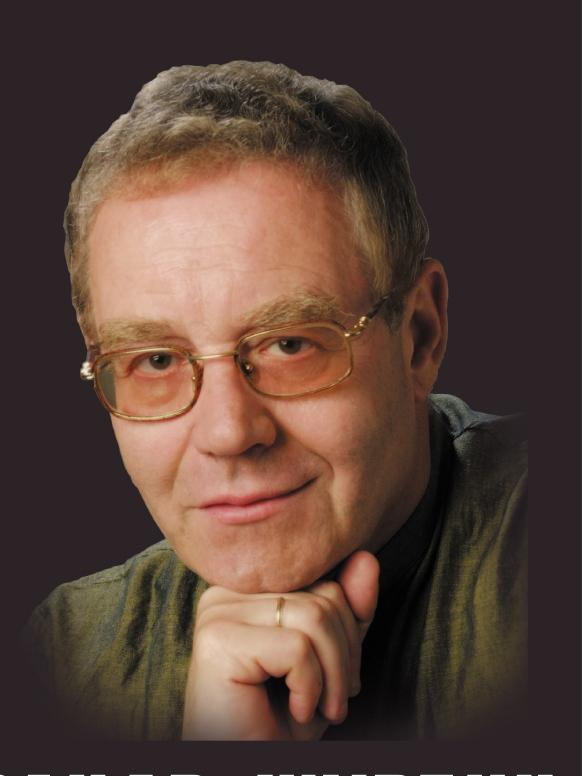

Background information
- Born: Alexander Borisovich Gandelsman (Александр Борисович Гандельсман); 7 August 1945 (age 81)
- Origin: Tashkent, Russian
- Genres: Classical, film music, Russian music
- Occupations: Musician, arranger, film composer, producer
- Instruments: Piano, vocal
- Years active: 1950–present
- Labels: AZ Records, Melodiya

Alexander Borisovich Zhurbin (Алекса́ндр Бори́сович Журби́н; born August 7, 1945, in Tashkent, Soviet Union) is a prolific Russian composer. His first success came in 1975 with a rock-opera, Orpheus and Eurydice, which had 3000 consecutive performances in the former Soviet Union, and is still being performed throughout Russia. He has composed scores for over 65 feature films and 50 musicals. He also has worked on multiple musical pieces including opera, musicals, symphonies and movie soundtracks. His songs have been performed by famous artists from Eastern Europe, such as Russian pop icon Alla Pugacheva, and Estonian singer Jaak Jola. Zhurbin is a laureate of the Ovation Award in the Living Legend category. Zhurbin is also active as writer and journalist. His reviews are published in SNOB.ru and the journal 7 Isskustv , among others.

== Biography ==
Alexander Borisovich Zhurbin was born in Middle Asian part of USSR. He graduated from Special Music School in 1963. In 1969 he graduated from Tashkent Conservatory as a cellist and Gnessin Music College as a composer. He undertook postgraduate studies as a musicologist in Leningrad, where he in 1973 completed his candidate of science dissertation on the Symphonies of Gustav Mahler.

Zhurbin's first big success came in 1975 with his rock-opera Orpheus and Eurydice. This work represented a pioneering achievement in the Soviet Union and received widespread acclaim. It achieved over two thousand consecutive performances, with more than two million copies of the associated record sold. Zhurbin was honored with numerous international awards for 'Orpheus and Eurydice', notably receiving the 'Star of the Year' accolade in Great Britain. The musical enjoyed widespread popularity across the Soviet Union, with more than 3,000 concurrent performances. It was recognized by the Guinness Book of Records as the longest-running musical featuring the original cast.

He has composed scores for over 50 feature films, including Dead Man's Letters and Perestroika. His extensive oeuvre includes eight operas and three ballets, which have been performed in premier Russian venues, including the Leningrad National Opera and the Moscow Chamber Opera. His prolific contribution to musical theatre has included more than forty musicals, all of which continue to be staged across the former Soviet Union. Some have exceeded 2,000 performances.

Zhurbin and his family have lived in New York City since 1990. He served as a composer-in-residence at the 92nd Street "Y" and a professor at Touro college. In 1992 he founded the Russian-American Theater "Wandering Stars", which became an important cultural force in the Russian-speaking community and produced nine large-scale theatrical productions, six of them with his music. His musical How It Was Done in Odessa was a critical success at the Walnut Street Theatre, Philadelphia, in 1991 and had an eight-week sold-out run with good reviews.

Among his compositions written in the USA were Cello Concerto, Violin Concerto, Symphony # 3 and 8, an opera "Good Health, Your Majesty", and a cantata "A Part of Speech", with lyrics by Joseph Brodsky, as well as songs, jingles and commercials. In 1996, an evening of Zhurbin's music was presented in Carnegie Hall (Weill Recital Hall), performed by Kristjan Järvi and the Absolute Ensemble.

Zhurbin's latest theater works are the musicals "Shalom, America" (after Sholom Asch), "Camera Obscura" (after Vladimir Nabokov), "Wandering Stars" (after Sholom Aleikhem). He has written several major theatrical works, including "Mousetrap" (a musical after Agatha Christie); Humiliated and Insulted (opera after Dostoevsky); and "The Seagull"– operetta after Anton Chekhov. All were produced in Moscow, St Petersburg and other cities. He scored the mini-series "Moscow Saga", based on the novel by Vasily Aksyonov.

In 2003, Zhurbin was awarded the Honorary Artist of the Russian Federation for his cultural work; in 2010 he received the Order of Honor.

In June of 2013, he was one of the founders of the Russian independent music companies, Gala Records Group, which was transformed into Warner Music Russia later on.

In 2015, an extended, two-and-a-half month festival of his works was presented, covering opera, musical, symphony, rock, film, and performances of his first four symphonies. It included the premiere of his Fifth Symphony "Speak, Memory!", and the premiere of his opera "Melkiy Bes" (Petty Demon), based on Sologub. A new opera by Zhurbin, "Love's Metamorphosis", was premiered in May 2017 at the Moscow Musical Theater, Nemirovich-Danchenko.

In the 2020-2021 season, a festival "Serious and Light", commemorating Zhurbin's 75th birthday, ran from September 2020 to February 2021. Works performed included the premieres of operas "Anna K." and "Happy Day", the premiere of his Sixth Symphony ("Con Programma Letterale"), and vocal and chamber music works.

In 2023, his musical "Dybbuk: Between Two Worlds" received a world premiere in Moscow at the "Estrada" Theatre to critical acclaim.

In 2024, he had secured a contract with Warner Chappell Music

In 2024, he received the Silver Medal from the Global Music Awards for his Symphony No. 5.

In 2025, he was named Honorary Professor of the Gnessine Academy, and the Tashkent Conservatory.

== Personal life ==
Zhurbin is married to the poet, translator and writer Irina Ginzburg. His son, Lev Zhurbin, is a composer and performer living in New York.

In response to claims that he is a member of the United Russia party, in an interview on Radio Liberty dated 21 November 2023, he categorically stated that he had never been a member of any political party, including United Russia.

== List of Works ==
=== Symphonic and Chamber Works ===
- Op. 1 – Quartet No. 1
- Op. 2 – "Cactus" – a folk tale for low voice and piano, text by V. Sosnora
- Op. 3 – Three Romances for medium voice & piano
- Op. 4 – "Fall of 1942" for voice and piano, text by A. Faynberg
- Op. 5 – Romance "Music" for high voice and piano, text by William Shakespeare.
- Op. 6 – Suite for piano.
- Op. 7 – Suite for flute, oboe, clarinet & bassoon.
- Op. 8 – Sonatina for viola and piano
- Op. 9 – Cantata "Russia, year 1111" for choir, soloists and orchestra, text by V. Sosnora
- Op. 10 – Song Cycle "Seven Soldier Songs" for baritone and piano.
- Op. 11 – Concertino for Oboe and String Orchestra
- Op. 12 -- "Children's Games", suite for string orchestra.
- Op. 13 – "In Memory of the Heroes", fantasy for large orchestra.
- Op. 14 – "Chorale and Allegro" for bayan
- Op. 15 – "Wooden Fair" – Romance for high voice, text by Rudolf Barinsky
- Op. 16 – Song Cycle "A Poet's Love", based on poems of R. M. Rilke, translated by T. Silman
- Op. 17 – "Improvisation and Toccata" for violin and piano
- Op. 18 – Sonata for piano
- Op. 19 – "Polyphonic Suite" for three flutes
- Op. 20 – Quartet No. 2
- Op. 21 – "Three Picasso Drawings"
- Op. 22 – "Prelude, Gavotte and Scherzo" for bayan/accordion
- Op. 23 – "Poeme" for French Horn and piano
- Op. 24 – "Polyphonic Partita" for string Quartet
- Op. 25 – "The Ratcatcher" Cantata, poems by M. Tsvetaeva
- Op. 26 – Symphony No. 1 "Sinfonia Concertante" (four movements)
- Op. 27 -- "Toccata" for bayan
- Op. 28 – Sonata for Double Bass and Piano
- Op. 29 – "Meeting with Lenin" – Symphonic-Choral Poem
- Op. 30 – Three Sonatas for Bayan
- Op. 31 – Symphony No. 2 "Sinfonia Giocosa"
- Op. 32 – Concerto for Viola and Orchestra
- Op. 33 – Songs for Children, texts by V. Suslov & M.Raykin
- Op. 34 – Song Cycle "From German Folk Poetry"
- Op. 35 – "The People's Earth" – oratorio
- Op. 36 – "Winter Songs" – six duets for mezzo-soprano and baritone, texts by Russian poets
- Op. 37 – "Fantasy and Fugue" for bayan
- Op. 38 – "Two Friends" – Poem for Orchestra and Vocalists, texts by A. Tvardovsky and R. Gamzatov
- Op. 39 – "Velimir" – four songs on poems by V. Khlebnikov
- Op. 40 – "Five Poems by Konstantin Batyushkov" – for mezzo-soprano, flute, horn and harp.
- Op. 41 – Concerto for Piano and Orchestra (3
- Op. 42 – Sonata for Cello and Piano
- Op. 43 – Piano Quintet
- Op. 44 – "Mashkerad", for choir a capella, texts by A. Sumarokov
- Op. 45 – "Marina" – seven songs, poems by M. Tsvetaeva
- Op. 46 – "Dithyrambe" for cello and chamber ensemble
- Op. 47 – "Three Muses" – suite for viola, double–bass and harpsichord
- Op. 48 – Concerto for Cello and Orchestra
- Op. 49 – Symphony No. 3 "Sinfonia Romantica"
- Op. 50 – "Part of Speech" – Cantata for Choir, poems by J. Brodsky in English & Russian
- Op. 51 – "Three Madrigals", poems by W. Shakespeare
- Op. 52 – Concerto for Violin and Orchestra
- Op. 53/1 "Musica Drammatica" for string orchestra.
- Op. 54/20 – "Musica Piccola" for string orchestra
- Op. 55/24 – "Musica polyphonica" for string orchestra
- Op. 56 – "The Poet" – song cycle, poems by M. Tsvetaeva
- Op. 57 – Symphony No. 4, "Sinfonia Tragica" / "City of The Plague" for soloists, mixed choir and large orchestra, in nine movements.
- Op. 58 – Symphony No. 5 "Sinfonia bizzarra" ("Speak, Memory!") – for large orchestra and four soloists (violin, viola, cello and piano), in fifteen movements.
- Op. 59 – "Love" – song cycle, poems by M. Tsvetaeva and O. Mandelshtam
- Op. 60 Fine Fantasy For Fadolín Solo (2020)
- Op. 61 Symphony No. 6 "Sinfonia con programma letterale" (2020)
- Op. 62 Symphony No. 7 "Sinfonia semplice"
- Op. 63 Three Muses for Fadolín Trio
- Op. 64 Symphony No. 8 "Patchwork Symphony"
- Op. 65 Three Muses for Woodwind Quartet (unperformed)
- Op. 66 Symphony No. 9 "Sinfonia Ludena"
- Op. 67 Symphony No. 10 "Divine Tragedy"
- Op. 68 Clarinet Quintet "Paris, mon amour!" (2024)
- Op. 69 "Seven Cruel Ballades" on texts by Bakhyt Kenzheev

=== Compositions for Musical Theater ===
Thea-opus 1 – “Let’s play Prince and The Pauper!” – musical for children and adults based on the novel by Mark Twain (Libretto by L. Losev with Y. Mikhailov)

Thea-opus 2 – “The Twins from Thebes” (“Someone named Heracles”) – Libretto by L. Losev with Y. Mikhailov)

Thea-opus 3 – “Orpheus & Eurydice” – rock opera based on a play by Y. Dimitrin

Thea-opus 4 – “Broken Mirror, or a New Pauper’s Opera” – opera based on themes of “Threepenny Opera” by B. Brecht. Libretto by V. Verbin

Thea-opus 5 – “Three Brothers” – a Russian comedy based on folk tales. Libretto by V. Sinakevich, V. Skvirskiy, lyrics by V. Uflyand

Thea-opus 6 – “A Cunning Girl in Love” – musical based on a play by Lope de Vega. Libretto by A. Zhurbin and M. Levshin

Thea-opus 7 –– “The Moon and the Detective” – opera based on stories by V. Lipatov. Libretto by Y. Dimitrin

Thea-opus 8 – “Zsuzsa from Budapest” – comedy based on a play by L. Zhukhovitsky, libretto by L. Zhukhovitsky and R. Rozhdestvensky, lyrics by R. Rozhdestvensky

Thea-opus 9 – “Penelope” – musical based on a play by B. Ratser and V. Konstatnitov. Libretto by B. Ratser and V. Konstatnitov.

Thea-opus 10 – “The Red Bird” – ballet for children. Libretto by M. Azov and V. Tixvinsky.

Thea-opus 11 – “Captain Fracas” (Le Captaine Fracasse)– musical based on a novel by T. Gautier, libretto by Y. Golyakov

Thea-opus 12 – “The Trap” – ballet based on “Threepenny Opera” by B. Brecht. Libretto by I. Gaft

Thea-opus 13 – “Agent 00” – musical based on a play by G. Borovik, libretto by G. Borovik

Thea-opus 14 – “Wedding in Old Age” – musical based on the play “Retro” by A. Galin, libretto by G. Fere

Thea-opus 15 – “The Frump” – musical based on a play by E. Braginsky and E. Ryazanov. Libretto by Y. Ryashentsev

Thea-opus 16 – “Impatience” – opera based on a novel by Y. Trifonov. Libretto by Y. Trifonov and O. Trifonov-Miroshnichenko

Thea-opus 17 – “Spell out the sum in words” – musical based on stories by O’Henry – Libretto by G. Sapgir and L. Khait

Thea-opus 18 – “The Marriage” – ballet based on the play by N. Gogol. Libretto by M. Bergtolz.

Thea-opus 19 – “The Drayman and the King / Sunset”) – musical on the play by Isaac Babel. Libretto by A. Eppel.

Thea-opus 20 – “Naples Story” – musical based on Lope De Vega’s “The Dog in the Manger”. Libretto by P. Gradov

Thea-opus 21 – “Fiorenza” – musical tragedy based on a novel by Thomas Mann. Libretto by P. Grushko

Thea-opus 22 – “An Unknown Love of Napoleon” – musical based on the play “The Man of Destiny” by Bernard Shaw. Libretto by G. Fere

Thea-opus 23 – “The Glass of Water”—musical based on a play by Eugène Scribe. Libretto by B. Ratser and V. Konstantinov

Thea-opus 24 – “Animal Farm” – musical based on a story by George Orwell, libretto by S. Task

Thea-opus 25 “Good Health to the Tsar!” – operetta for children based on Russian Fairy Tales. English Libretto by E. Rael

Thea-opus 26 – “The Nervous Splendor” – musical after a book by Frederic Morton. Libretto by B. Liss

Thea-opus 27 – “Shalom, America!” – musical based on the novel “Uncle Moses” by Sh. Ash. Libretto by B. Ratser

Thea-opus 28 – “The Lips (Camera Obscura)” – musical based on the novel by V. Nabokov. Libretto by V. Mishin

Thea-opus 29 – “Wandering Stars” – musical based on the novel by Sholom Aleichem. Libretto by B. Ratser

Thea-opus 30. “The Farewell Concerto” – musical poem for theater – in memoriam V. Kozin, Libretto by M. Bartenyev and E. Isaeva

Thea-opus 31 – “The Mouse Trap” – musical detective tale based on the play by Agatha Christie. Libretto by O. Ivanova and lyrics by L. Gulyakin

Thea-opus 32 – “The Insulted and Humiliated” – musical based on a novel by F. Dostoyevsky. Libretto by V. Verbin

Thea-opus 33 – “A New Teacher for Fools” – musical based on the play “Fools” by Neil Simon. Libretto by S. Task

Thea-opus 34 -- “Eight Women” – musical detective story based on a play by Robert Thomas. Libretto by E. Isaeva

Thea-opus 35 – “Learomania” – rock opera based on the play “King Lear” by Shakespeare. Libretto by V. Prokhanov

Thea-opus 36 – “The Dybbuk” – musical based on a play by S. An-Sky. Libretto by V. Starchevsky

Thea-opus 37 – “Doctor Zhivago” – musical based on the novel by B. Pasternak. Libretto by M. Bartenyev

Thea-opus 38 – “A Purely Russian Murder” – musical detective tale based on a play by V. Krasnogorov. Libretto by V. Krasnogorov

Thea-opus 39 – “Dead Souls” – musical poem based on the poem by N. Gogol. Libretto by O. Ivanova and A. Butvilovsky, with A. Zhurbin Lyrics by S. Plotov

Thea-opus 40 – “The Seagull” – musical based on a play by A. Chekhov. Libretto by V. Zhuk

Thea-opus 41 -- “French Marriage” – Libretto by G. Spektor and G. Gelovani

Thea-opus 42 – “Caesar and Cleopatra” – musical based on a play by Bernard Shaw. Libretto by Zh. Zherder with A. Zhurbin

Thea-opus 43 – “Albert & Giselle” – Libretto by Y. Ryashentsev, G. Pollidi and A. Zhurbin. Lyrics by Y. Ryashentsev

Thea-opus 44 – “The Waiting List (A Man and a Woman)” – Libretto by A. Mardan. Lyrics by A. Mardan and S. Plotov.

Thea-opus 45 – “The Petty Demon” ¬– opera based on the novel by F. Sologub and a play by V. Semenovsky. Libretto by V. Semenovsky and A. Zhurbin

Thea-opus 46 – “The Minor” – musical based on a play by D. Fonvizin. Libretto by L. Yakovlev

Thea-opus 47 – “Anna K” – opera based on the novel “Anna Karenina” by L. Tolstoy. Libretto by A. Rodionova, S. Plotov and A. Zhurbin

Thea-opus 48 – “The Nutcracker and The Mouse King” – musical on the fable by E.T.A. Hoffmann. Libretto by Zh. Zherder with A. Zhurbin

Thea-opus 49 – “The Metamorphosis of Love”. Three one-act operas: “Faithfullness”, “Adultery” and “Erotica”. Libretto by A. Levshin and A. Zhurbin based on historical themes.

Thea-opus 50 -- "Happy Day" Libretto by M. Marfin, based on Hans-Christian Andersen, premiered in Moscow in 2021

Thea-opus 51 -- "The Courtesan" Libretto by S. Plotov and V. Starchevsky

Thea-opus 52 -- "Marriage Agency"

Thea-opus 53 -- "Angelo" (after Shakespeare and Pushkin) (unfinished)

Thea-opus 54 -- "Moscow-Petushki" libretto by Sergei Plotov - work-in-development

== Literary works ==
2021 -- "The Great Tenth"

2020 -- "Backstage Secrets and other tales"

2016 -- "Of Times, Of Music and of Myself"

2014 -- "My History of Music, or a Musical Crossroads"

2011 -- "My Musical Life"

2007 -- "Sounds of Musical" (audiobook)

2006 -- "Orpheus, Eurydice, and I"

2005 -- "A Composer, writing words"

2002 -- "AlexanderZhurbin.composer"

1999 -- "How It Was Done In America -- Autobiographical Notes"

== See also ==
- Russian pop music
