= Nevada Ballet Theatre =

American regional ballet company

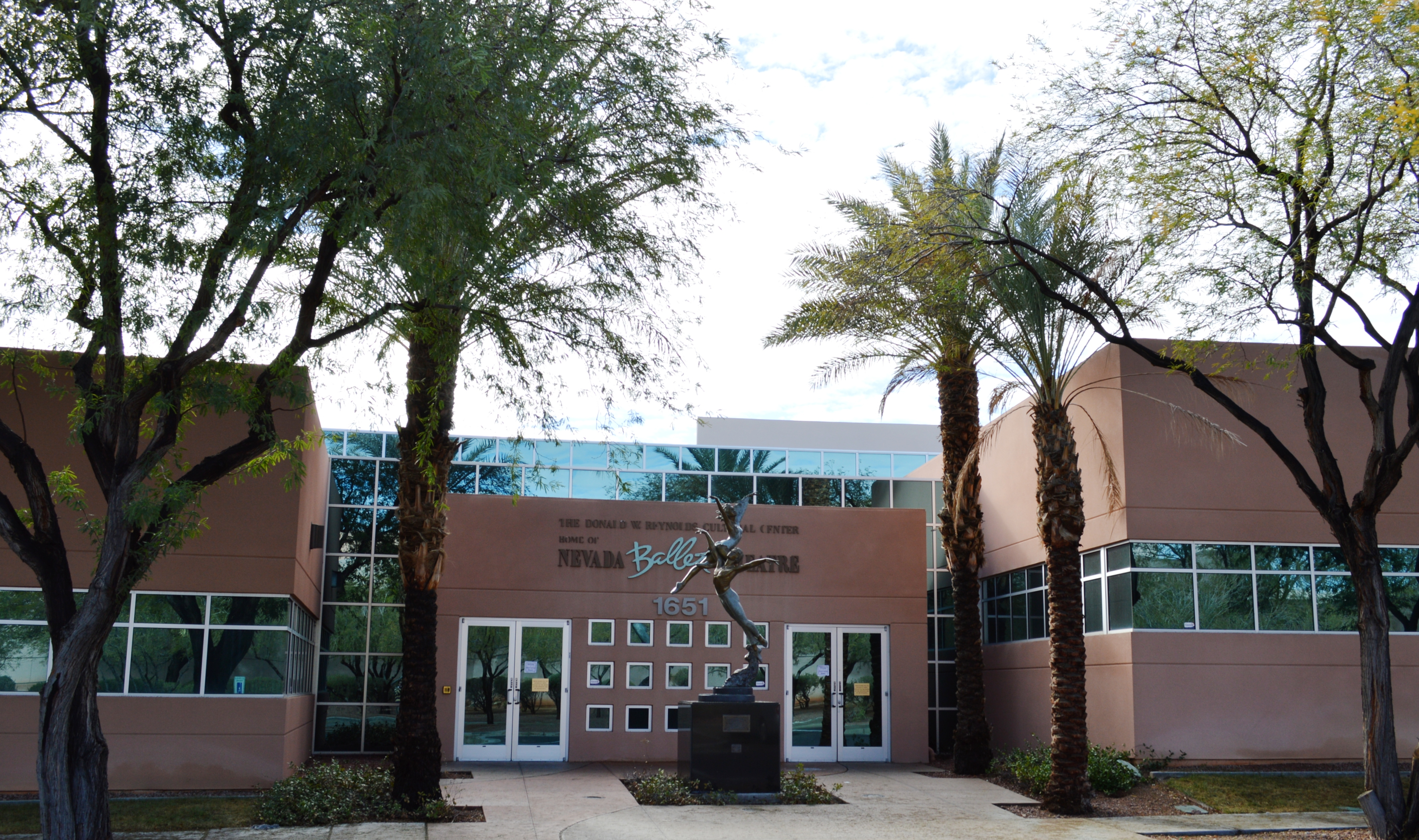
Nevada Ballet Theatre's Summerlin facility.

Nevada Ballet Theatre (NBT) is a regional ballet company located in Las Vegas, Nevada, United States. It is the Resident Ballet Company of The Smith Center for the Performing Arts and is one of the largest performing arts organizations in the state. Its professional company of dancers possesses a versatile repertoire ranging from well-known story ballets such as The Nutcracker, The Sleeping Beauty, and Swan Lake to works by George Balanchine, Twyla Tharp, Val Caniparoli, James Canfield, Thaddeus Davis and many more. The organization also operates an Academy out of its main facility in Summerlin, as well as an education & outreach program, Future Dance, that reaches over 16,000 students each year in schools throughout Southern Nevada.

== History ==
The vision of a professional ballet company based in Las Vegas was brought to life in 1972 when Vassili Sulich, then the principal dancer with the Tropicana Hotel and Casino's famed Folies Bergere, gathered a group of ballet dancers from the Las Vegas Boulevard entertainment industry and presented a series of dance concerts to an enthusiastic public at the University of Las Vegas (UNLV) Performing Arts Center's Judy Bayley Theatre. The overwhelmingly positive reception of the community, combined with the support of UNLV, was such that within two years a volunteer board, headed by founding chairman and former dancer, Nancy Houssels, was established. Soon, Mr. Sulich's volunteer dancers became Nevada Dance Theatre and during the next 25 years of his leadership, together with the pioneer spirit of co-founder Nancy Houssels, a professional ballet company emerged. In 1997, Bruce Steivel joined the company as its second artistic director, and the organization was renamed Nevada Ballet Theatre.

== The Company Today ==
Now in its 47th performance season, NBT has been under the artistic direction of Roy Kaiser since 2017. Beth Barbre is currently the Executive Director and CEO. Other artistic staff includes former prima ballerina Cynthia Gregory as NBT's artistic coach and advisor, former NBT principal dancer Clarice Geissel-Rathers as the company's Ballet Mistress, and Tara Foy, Dodie Askegard and Monika Rostomian as Company Instructors.

In addition to its residency at The Smith Center, the company also collaborates annually with Cirque Du Soleil to present, "A Choreographer's Showcase." In this one-of-a-kind program, choreographers from both organizations are chosen to create original works incorporating both Nevada Ballet Theatre dancers and Cirque performers.
