= Irina Ponarovskaya =

Russian actor and singer

Irina Ponarovskaya Ирина Понаровская
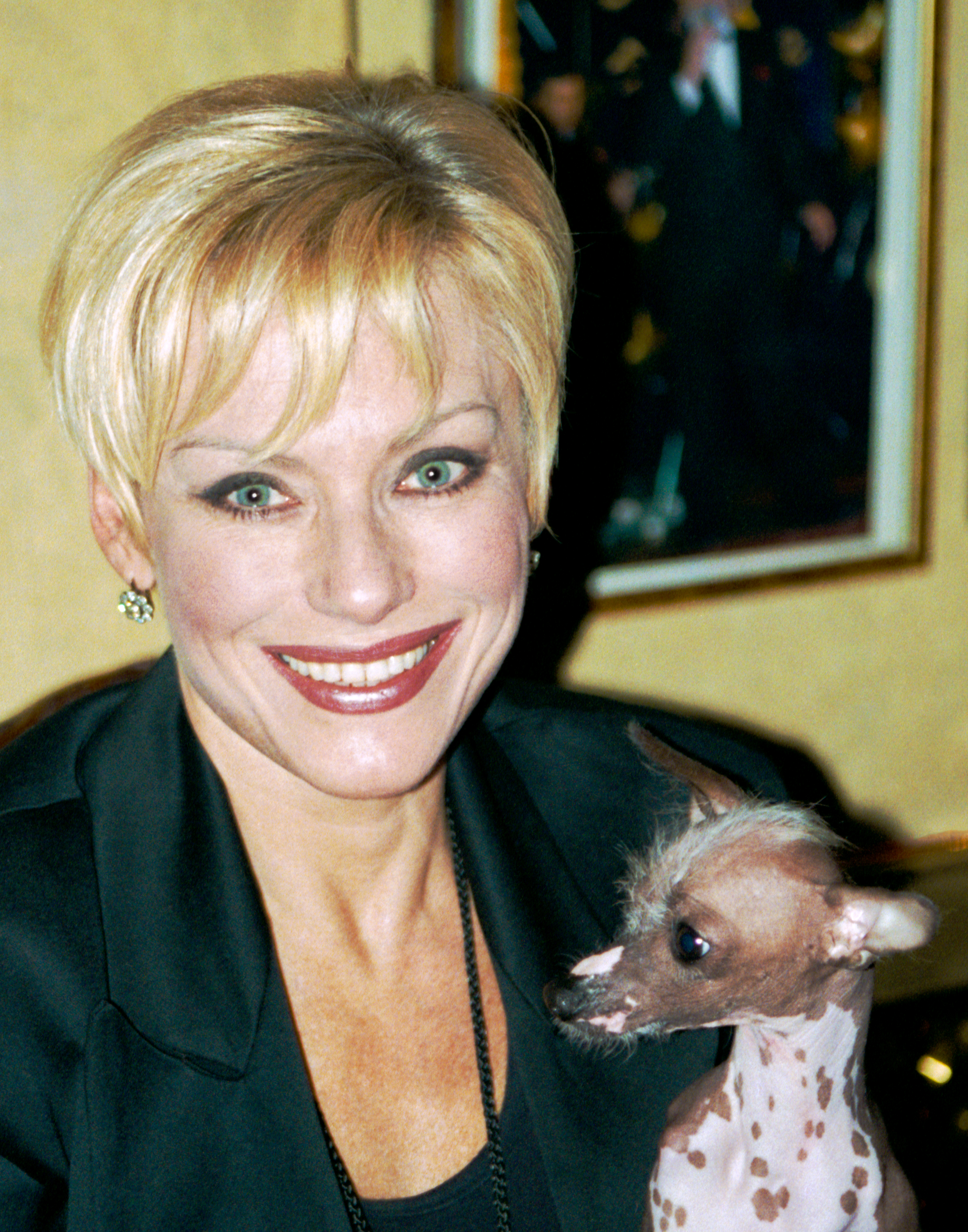
- Irina Ponarovskaya
- Born: Irina Vitalyevna Ponarovskaya; 12 March 1953 (age 73); Leningrad, RSFSR, USSR (now Saint Petersburg, Russia)
- Occupations: Singer, actress
- Years active: 1971—present
- Awards: Sopot International Song Festival (Winner,1976); Merited Artist of the Russian Federation (2019)
- Website: Irina Ponarovskaya

Irina Vitalyevna Ponarovskaya (Russian: Ирина Витальевна Понаровская; born 12 March 1953 in Leningrad) is a Soviet and Russian singer and film actress, popular in the 1980s and the 1990s.

== Biography ==
Ponarovskaya was born on 12 March 1953 in Leningrad, to Vitaliy Borisovich Ponarovsky and Nina Nikolayevna (née Arnoldi), the latter of German descent. At the age of six, she started playing the piano. She graduated from music school at the Leningrad Conservatory, where she studied harp and piano. At fifteen she started studying vocals with the well known teacher Lina Arkhangelskaya. In September 1971 she enrolled in the Conservatory and, while still a student, in 1971-1976 performed as a singer with the pop band Poyushchiye Gitary (The Singing Guitars). In 1974 she starred as Eurydice in the first Soviet rock opera film Orpheus and Eurydice. In 1976 she moved to Moscow, where for two years she sang with Oleg Lundstrem's jazz orchestra. Since 1976, she started to be cast in the Soviet movies, and in 1978 graduated the conservatory as a professional pianist.

In the 1980s she appeared in several films and various musical TV programs, including Song of the Year, Morning Mail, Little Blue Light, Around the Laughter, performing regularly at the official Militia Day concert, on 10 November. She co-hosted the children's TV show Alarm Clock. In 1988, in the central hall of the Kremlin "Russia", she held her first solo concert in Moscow, titled "From the Start".

In 1990, Ponarovskaya released her first major album That's the Way My Life Goes. The video for the title track came out in February 1993. In the early 1990s, she performed in a duet with Bogdan Titomir. In the mid-1990s, she co-hosted a TV fitness program called Irina Ponarovskaya's Fitness Class, for which she developed her own method of gymnastics and nutrition. In 1997, she held another solo concert titled The Woman is Always Right at the Russia Concert Hall. That year her eponymous second album came out.

In 2000 Ponaroskaya started the fashion line I-ra, then her own fashion house in New York. A year later she opened the image agency The Style Space (Пространство стиля). Later in 2000s Ponarovskaya started her own designer business, which went bankrupt. The compilation album Irina Ponarovskaya Sings came out in 2008. Around this time she retired from the music scene and moved to Estonia, where she spent most of the 2010s, but returned for two massive concert shows in Saint Petersburg (in 2010 and 2014) and the NTV-organized benefit in 2011.

== Recognition and awards ==
- The laureate of the two international pop competitions, "Dresden-75" (first prize), and "Sopot-76" (Grand Prix).
- Miss Chanel of the Soviet Union (1990).
- Nominal Star at the Star of Stars Square in Moscow (16 April 1997)

== Best hits ==
- "Знаю, любил" (1986, "I know, you loved")
- "Я больше не хочу" (1988, "I don't want anymore")
- "Незажжённая свеча" (1988, "Unlighted candle")
- "Рябиновые бусы" (1989, "Rowan beads")

== Filmography ==
- 1974 Wedding Krechinsky (TV Movie) as Lidochka Muromskaya (singing voice)
- 1977 I do not care as Regina Mikhailovna Korabelnikova
- 1977 Walnut Krakatuk (TV Movie) as Fairy of Time
- 1983 The Trust That Has Burst (Mini-Series) as Pseudo Sarah Bernard
- 1984 Vacation of Petrov and Vasechkin, Usual and Incredible as Inna Andreevna (singing voice)
- 1992 He will receive his as Gloria
