= CityDance =

American contemporary dance company

CityDance Ensemble
- Company type: GNO
- Industry: Dance
- Founded: 1996; 30 years ago North Bethesda, Maryland, U.S.
- Founder: Paul Emerson
- Area served: DMV area
- Key people: Alexandra Nowakowski (President & CEO); Karen Thomas (Chair)
- Website: citydance.net

CityDance is a non-profit organization based in Maryland and Washington, D.C. The organization, founded in 1996, has three divisions: CityDance Conservatory, which focuses on pre/professional dance training; CityDance Studios, which brings companies to the region's performance venues and supports emerging artists to create and present original works, and CityDance Presents, their outreach education arm. It formerly also had a dance company, CityDance Ensemble, which disbanded in 2011. CityDance is directed by Executive Director Alexandra Nowakowski. The organization's studio education division and Conservatory program is led by Lorraine Audeoud Spiegler.

== CityDance Ensemble ==
CityDance Ensemble was a contemporary repertory dance company based in Washington, D.C., and North Bethesda, Maryland. The company was founded in 1996 and disbanded in 2011, and the founder and artistic director, Paul Emerson departed.

=== Awards and recognition ===
CityDance Ensemble was described as "Washington's preeminent modern dance company." In 2003, the company was named one of Dance Magazine's "25 to Watch". FilmWORKS was awarded the 2005 Washington, D.C., Mayor's Arts Award for Innovation in the Arts in January 2006. The Washington Post praised the company in 2007, saying "finally, we have a home-grown modern dance company that can compete with the best."

=== Repertoire ===
CityDance Ensemble performed dances by choreographers from around the world. Using three signature series, the company kept both historic and cutting edge choreography on the stage throughout its concert season.

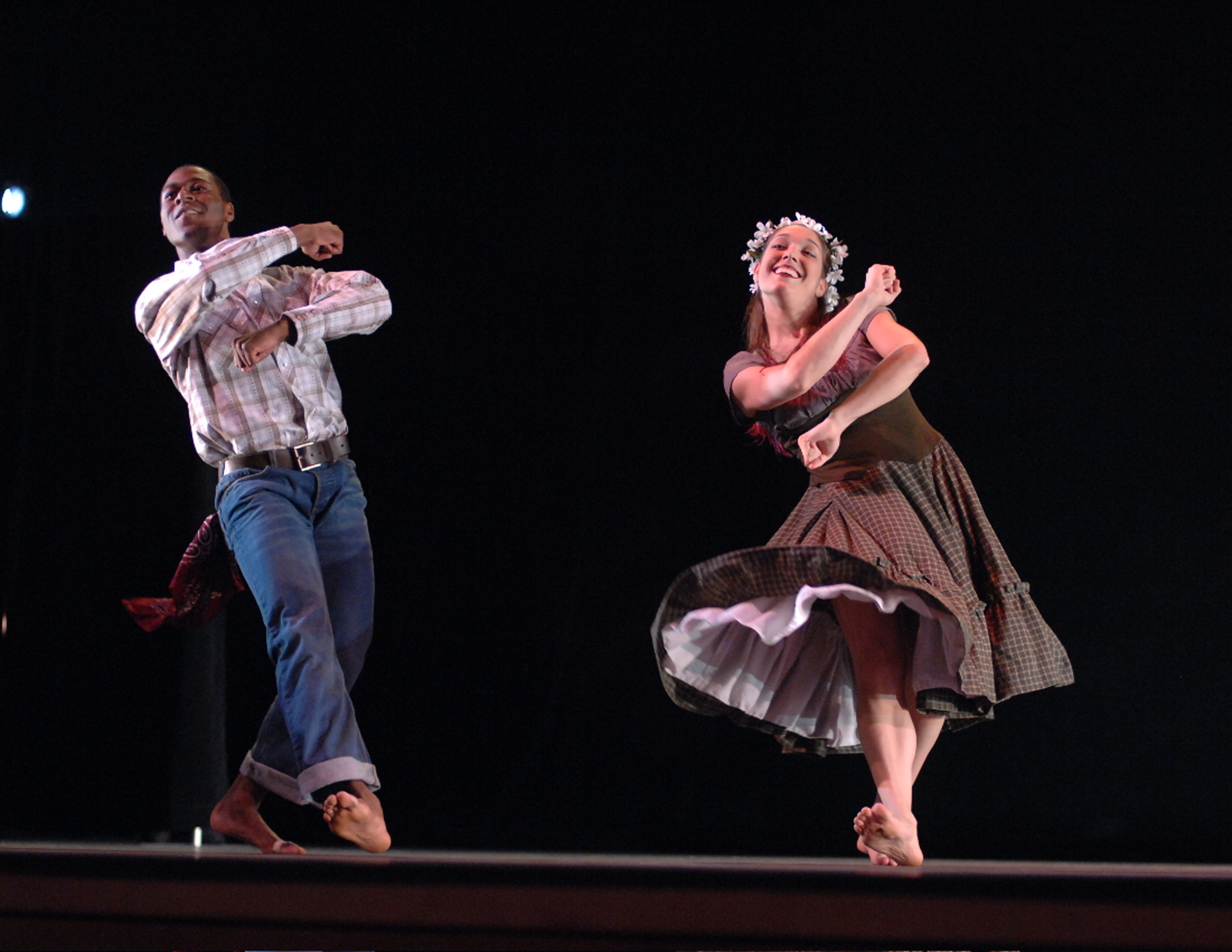
Folksay by Sophie Maslow

The Legacy Series reconstructed great and significant works of modern dance from the first 100 years of modern dance's history. In 2007 the company was awarded a prestigious "American Masterpieces: Dance" grant by the New England Foundation for the Arts to re-stage "Folksay," a dance made in 1942 by the late Sophie Maslow. Set to a score by Woody Guthrie, "Folksay" is considered among the most significant modern dances of the period. CityDance has also staged "Dust Bowl Ballads," by Maslow. "Dust Bowl Ballads" reflects upon the American Experience during the 1930s dust bowl which swept through many parts of the American Midwest, causing the dust bowl migration made famous by John Steinbeck's "Grapes of Wrath." Also in the Legacy Series canon is "Harmonica Breakdown" by Jane Dudley. A 1938 work set to the "Harmonica and Washboard Blues" by Sonny Terry and Oh Red, "Harmonica Breakdown" is 4 minute solo work.

== Education programs ==
CityDance Select

The CityDance Center at Strathmore is located in the state-of-the-art Music Center at Strathmore in suburban Maryland. CityDance is also the dance education partner at the prestigious Madeira School for girls in McLean, Virginia, directing the dance education programming at Madeira.

CityDance Community Programs was the company's education division, with year-round after-school programs for children in the Washington, D.C., area. The program had a special emphasis on at-risk students in the District of Columbia, and partners with the NBA Washington Wizards, The D.C. Commission on the Arts and Humanities, the Children and Youth Investment Trust Corporation and others.

== Partnerships ==
CityDance is in partnership with many of Washington, D.C. arts organizations, including Washington Performing Arts, the Harman Center for the Arts, home of the Shakespeare Theatre Company, the Music Center at Strathmore, the Baltimore Symphony Orchestra, and the Levine School of Music.

== Gallery ==
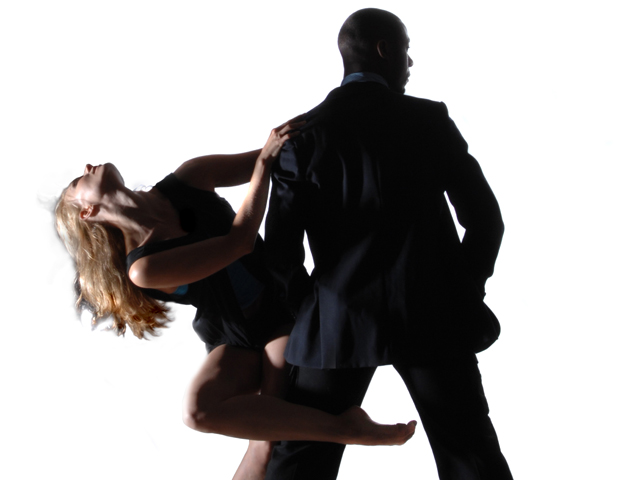

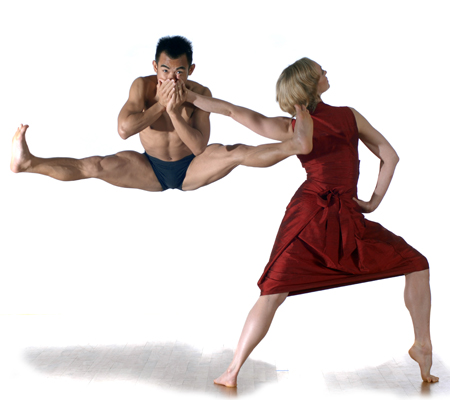

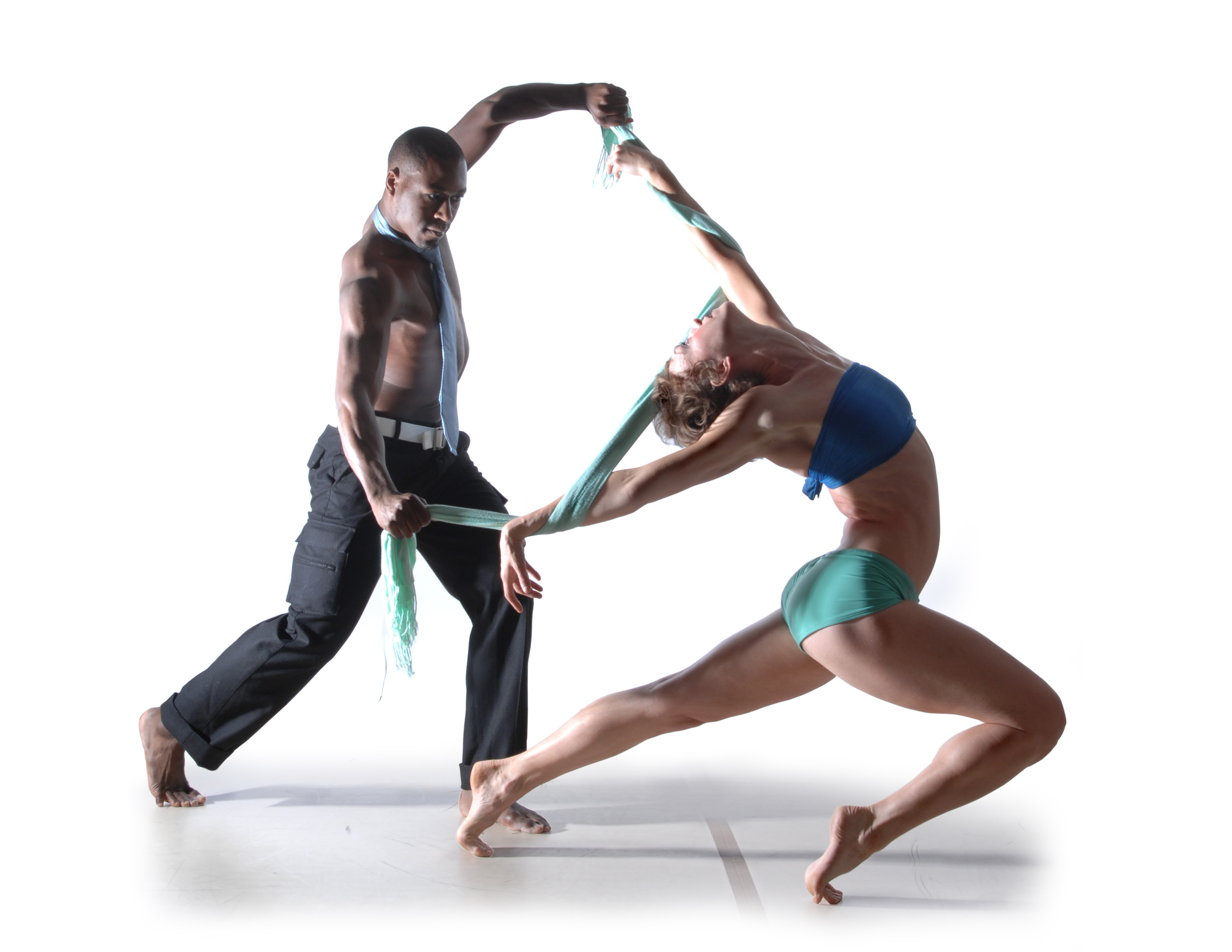

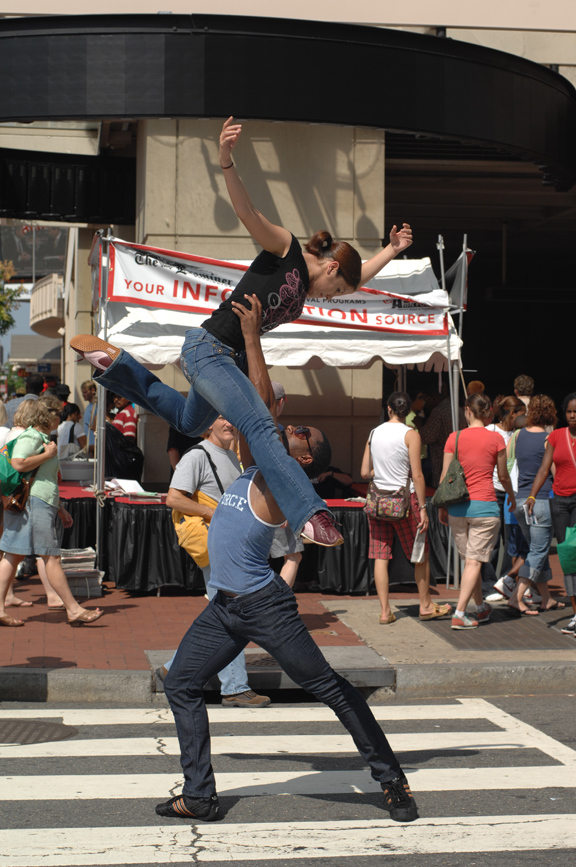
