= Parsons Dance =

American contemporary dance company

PARSONS DANCE
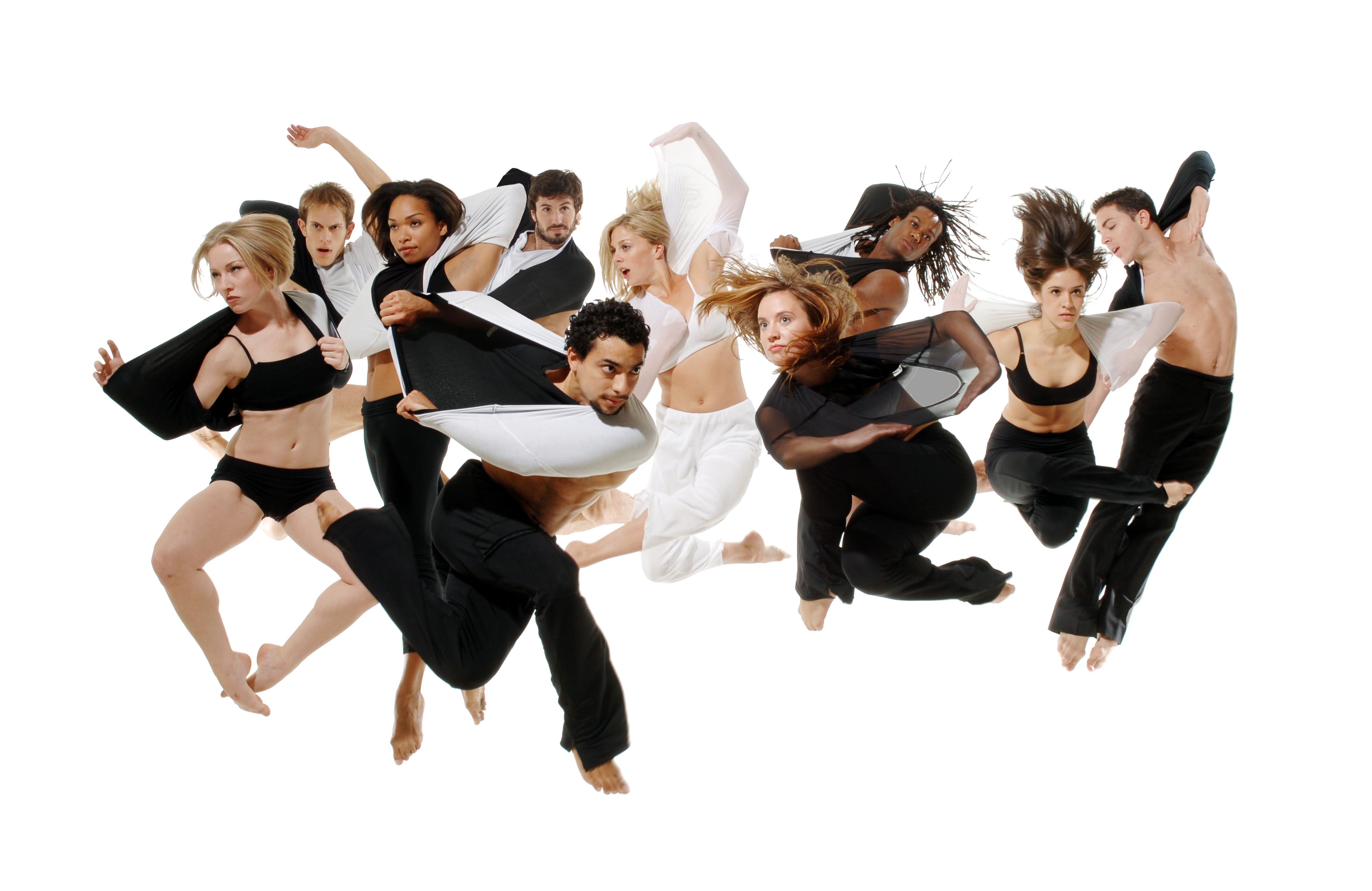
- Parsons Dancers

Background information
- Origin: New York, NY
- Genres: Dance
- Years active: 1985 – present
- Website: Dance Website

Parsons Dance is a contemporary dance company founded in 1985 by choreographer David Parsons and lighting designer Howell Binkley that tours nationally and internationally and includes an annual season in New York City, its base.

== History ==
Parsons Dance was founded on July 17, 1985, by David Parsons and Howell Binkley.

The company consists of nine full-time dancers. It maintains a repertory of more than 80 works, 20 featuring commissioned original scores by composers and musicians including Dave Matthews, Michael Gordon, Milton Nascimento, John Mackey, and Phil Woods. Parsons Dance has collaborated with many other artists, including Julie Taymor, William Ivey Long, Annie Leibovitz, Donna Karan and Alex Katz. Since its founding, the company has performed in more than 445 cities, 30 countries, and 5 continents.

In addition to performances, Parsons Dance also provides various education and outreach programs, workshops, post-show discussions, open rehearsals, studio showcases, and open company classes. In 2016, the company launched Autism-Friendly Programs, featuring sensory-friendly programs and relaxed performances.

As of 2021, Parsons is Artistic Director and Choreographer. The company performs in the Joyce Theater.

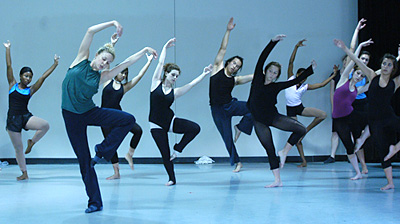
Dancer Abby Silva leads a master class at the Parsons Dance Company in May 2006.

== Notable people ==
- Robert Battle
- Roger Montoya
- Katarzyna Skarpetowska (1999-2006)
