= List of choreographers =

This is a list of choreographers:

== A ==
- Aaliyah
- Paula Abdul
- Kyle Abraham
- Alvin Ailey
- Debbie Allen
- Richard Alston
- Sir Frederick Ashton
- Fred Astaire
- Bob Avian

== B ==
- George Balanchine
- Claude Balon
- Melissa Barak
- Margaret Barr
- Mikhail Baryshnikov
- Aszure Barton
- Steve Barton
- Toni Basil
- Pina Bausch
- Jeanne Beaman
- Pierre Beauchamp
- Paul Becker
- Maurice Béjart
- Bruno Beltrão
- María Benítez
- Michael Bennett
- Busby Berkeley
- Pepsi Bethel
- Zina Bethune
- Mari Bicknell
- Mauro Bigonzetti
- Carla Blank
- Andy Blankenbuehler
- Walter Bobbie
- Jonah Bokaer
- Chrystelle Trump Bond
- Matthew Bourne
- August Bournonville
- Marc Breaux
- Chris Brown
- Trisha Brown
- Christopher Bruce
- Dana Tai Soon Burgess
- Jean Butler

== C ==
- pt:António M Cabrita
- Gloria Campobello
- Nellie Campobello
- pt:São Castro
- Jonathan Stuart Cerullo
- Kate Champion
- Sean Cheesman
- Sidi Larbi Cherkaoui
- Lucinda Childs
- Joyce Ching
- Marie Chouinard
- Paul Christiano
- Ciara
- Martha Clarke
- Jack Cole
- Flick Colby
- Gloria Contreras Roeniger
- Calico Cooper
- Sheryl Cooper
- Lucia Cormani
- Jean Coralli
- Lillian Covillo
- John Cranko
- Bill Cratty
- Birgit Cullberg
- Merce Cunningham
- Sean Curran

== D ==
- Rudi van Dantzig
- Siobhan Davies
- David Dawson
- Anne Teresa De Keersmaeker
- Yemi Akinyemi Dele
- Agnes de Mille
- Maya Deren
- Marguerite Derricks
- Prabhu Deva
- Linda Diamond
- Tyce Diorio
- Marguerite Donlon
- David Dorfman
- Ulysses Dove
- Remo D'souza
- Tabitha and Napoleon D'umo
- Isadora Duncan
- Katherine Dunham

== E ==
- Hilary Easton
- Eiko & Koma
- Mats Ek
- Alexander Ekman
- Chris Elam
- Jorma Elo
- Parker Esse
- Bill Evans

== F ==
- Garth Fagan
- Eliot Feld
- Molissa Fenley
- Raoul Auger Feuillet
- Michael Flatley
- Maureen Fleming
- Anne Fletcher
- Michel Fokine
- William Forsythe
- Simone Forti
- Bob Fosse
- Celia Franca
- Brian Friedman
- Larry Fuller
- Loie Fuller

== G ==
- Misha Gabriel
- Antonio Gades
- Eddie Garcia
- Jason Gardiner
- Sonia Gaskell
- Jodie Gates
- Kim Gavin
- Jean-Marc Généreux
- Yvonne Georgi
- Laurieann Gibson
- Christopher Gillis
- Béatrice Kombe Gnapa
- Parris Goebel
- Chachi Gonzales
- Len Goodman
- David Gordon
- Martha Graham
- Yuri Grigorovich
- Victor Gsovsky
- Richard Gutierrez

== H ==
- MC Hammer
- Christopher Hampson
- Ciara Harris
- Paul Harris
- Erick Hawkins
- Ganesh Hegde
- Robert Helpmann
- Keith Hennessy
- Heike Hennig
- Darrin Henson
- Mark Herras
- Tatsumi Hijikata
- Robert Hoffman
- Saskia Hölbling
- Boscoe Holder
- Christian Holder
- Geoffrey Holder
- Hollywood Jade
- Hanya Holm
- Lester Horton
- Derek Hough
- Christopher House
- Young Soon Hue
- Doris Humphrey

== I ==
- Nunzio Impellizzeri
- Carrie Ann Inaba
- Ana Itelman

== J ==
- Jay Jackson
- Janet Jackson
- Michael Jackson
- Richard Jackson
- Judith Jamison
- Shobana Jeyasingh
- Robert Joffrey
- Bill T. Jones
- Tamsier Joof
- Chris Judd

== K ==
- Geeta Kapoor
- Dan Karaty
- Teet Kask
- Gene Kelly
- Akram Khan
- Farah Khan
- Mudassar Khan
- Saroj Khan
- Rajeev Khinchi
- Michael Kidd
- Jamie King
- Charles Klapow
- Michael Klien
- Theodore Kosloff
- Pavlos Kourtidis
- Harry Kramer
- Jiří Kylián

== L ==
- Noemie Lafrance
- Wayne Lamb
- Tina Landon
- Noemi Lapzeon
- Josefina Lavalle
- Joe Layton
- Douglas Lee
- Ralph Lemon
- Abigail Levine
- Daniel Lewis
- Bella Lewitzky
- Edwaard Liang
- Tanja Liedtke
- José Limón
- Susanne Linke
- Gary Lloyd
- Édouard Lock
- Annabelle Lopez Ochoa
- Murray Louis
- Lar Lubovitch
- Nadine Lustre
- Gillian Lynne

== M ==
- Brian Macdonald
- Kenneth MacMillan
- Nakul Dev Mahajan
- Miriam Mahdaviani
- Russell Maliphant
- Tatiana Mamaki
- Hans van Manen
- Luigi Manzotti
- Susan Marshall
- Cathy Marston
- Léonide Massine
- William Matons
- Sabrina Matthews
- Matt Mattox
- Julianna Rose Mauriello
- Harrison McEldowney
- Gates McFadden
- Blake McGrath
- Wayne McGregor
- Trey McIntyre
- Donald McKayle
- Greta Mendez
- Vaibhavi Merchant
- Ana Mérida
- Sulamith Messerer
- Mia Michaels
- Benjamin Millepied
- Abby Lee Miller
- Daichi Miura
- Mathilde Monnier
- Mark Morris
- Graeme Murphy
- Mary Murphy

== N ==
- Daniel Nagrin
- Ohad Naharin
- Fernand Nault
- Rex Nettleford
- John Neumeier
- Bronislava Nijinska
- Vaslav Nijinsky
- Alwin Nikolais
- Malgorzata Nowacka
- Rudolf Nureyev

== O ==
- Gideon Obarzanek
- May O'Donnell
- Kazuo Ohno
- Kenny Ortega

== P ==
- Veronica Paeper
- Ruth Page
- Stephen Page
- Hermes Pan
- Dimitris Papaioannou
- Steve Paxton
- Travis Payne
- Tom Pazik
- Justin Peck
- Louis-Guillaume Pécour
- Rosie Perez
- Jules Perrot
- Michael Peters
- Marius Petipa
- Roland Petit
- Stephen Petronio
- Arlene Phillips
- Crystal Pite
- Anna Plisetskaya
- Angelin Preljocaj
- Pearl Primus

== R ==
- Yvonne Rainer
- Marie Rambert
- Pierre Rameau
- Alexei Ratmansky
- Dwight Rhoden
- Jerome Robbins
- Fatima Robinson
- Wade Robson
- Ginger Rogers
- Pedro Romeiras
- Gunhild Rosén
- David Roussève
- Jeanne Ruddy
- Henning Rübsam

== S ==
- Ruth St. Denis
- Arthur Saint-Leon
- Marie Sallé
- Ana Sanchez-Colberg
- Karine Saporta
- Margo Sappington
- Liam Scarlett
- Oskar Schlemmer
- Troy Schumacher
- Dave Scott
- Sekhar
- Adam G. Sevani
- Adam Shankman
- Robert Sher-Machherndl
- Sherrie Silver
- Rosy Simas
- Stefan Sittig
- Mary Skeaping
- Detlef Soost
- Sandip Soparrkar
- Shane Sparks
- Jody Sperling
- Morleigh Steinberg
- Garry Stewart
- Tatiana Stepanova
- Alyson Stoner
- Susan Stroman
- Raju Sundaram

== T ==
- Meryl Tankard
- John Taras
- Sonya Tayeh
- June Taylor
- Paul Taylor
- Lynne Taylor-Corbett
- Tony Testa
- Twyla Tharp
- Eddy Thomas
- Lisa Joann Thompson
- John Tiller
- Helgi Tómasson
- Bruno Tonioli
- Antony Tudor
- Tommy Tune

== U ==
- Jorma Uotinen

== V ==
- Agrippina Vaganova
- Athina Vahla
- Wim Vandekeybus
- Joselo Vega
- Kenneth von Heidecke
- Vyjayanthimala

== W ==
- Travis Wall
- Sasha Waltz
- Leigh Warren
- John Weaver
- Natalie Weir
- Stanton Welch
- Chehon Wespi-Tschopp
- Christopher Wheeldon
- Onna White
- Mary Wigman
- Suzy Willson
- Nina Winthrop
- Amy Wright
- Douglas Wright
- Peter Wright
- Rebecca Wright
- Kimberly Wyatt
- Leni Wylliams

== X–Z ==
- Dharmesh Yelande
- Nellie Yu Roung Ling
- Vladimir Mikhailovich Zakharov

== See also ==
- Dance
- List of dancers
