= Campobello =

Campobello may refer to:

- Campobello, South Carolina
- Campobello di Mazara, Sicily, Italy
- Campobello di Licata, Sicily, Italy
- Campobello Island, New Brunswick

== People with the surname ==
- Gloria Campobello (1911–1968), Mexican ballet dancer and choreographer
- Nellie Campobello (1900–1986), Mexican writer, ballet dancer and choreographer

== See also ==
- Roosevelt Campobello International Park
- Sunrise at Campobello
