= Josefina Lavalle =

Mexican ballet dancer and choreographer

- Born: January 29, 1924; Mexico City, Mexico
- Died: May 25, 2009 (aged 85); Mexico City, Mexico
- Occupations: ballet dancer, choreographer and ballet director

Josefina Lavalle (born Mexico City, January 29, 1924 – died Mexico City, May 25, 2009) was a Mexican ballet dancer, choreographer and ballet director. She established together with Guillermina Bravo the national ballet company in Mexico City in 1948

== Biography ==
Lavalle was born in Mexico City. She studied at the Escuela Nacional de Danza under Nellie and Gloria Campobello, and became a member of Waldeen's ballet of fine arts (Spanish: Ballet de Bellas Artes). Together with Anna Sokolow she discovered her talent for contemporary dance and got her first contact to José Limón, when she took part in a course of choreography for young dancers. In 1955 Carlos Chávez made her primaballerina and choreographer of the academy of Mexican dance (Spanish: Academia de la Danza Mexicana) and he discovered her really talent during the works of "Misa brevis" with the Ballet de Bellas Artes in 1961. Lavalle was director of the Academia de la Danza Mexicana from 1959 to 1969 and for a second time from 1972 to 1978.

Amongst others, Lavalle was awarded with the "José Limón" medal of the Instituto Nacional de Bellas Artes y Literatura in the Palacio de Bellas Artes on January 19, 2008.

She died in 2009.
