= List of theaters for dance =

This is a list of venues designed for the express purpose of presenting dance performances. Dance venues such as these often have particular attributes including sprung floors and steeply raked seating areas. In addition, these spaces commonly convert into rehearsal spaces or dance studios equipped with mirrors.

== Belgium ==
- La Monnaie – Brussels

== England ==
- Laban Theatre – South East London
- The King's Hall – Herne Bay, Kent; auditorium doubles as dance area with sprung floor
- The Place: Centre for Contemporary Dance – London

== France ==
- Opéra de Paris
- Opéra Bastille – Paris
- Théâtre de la Ville – Paris

== Poland ==
- Kraków Dance Theatre

== United States ==
- Ailey Citigroup Theater – New York City
- Theater at Cedar Lake Contemporary Ballet – New York City
- Cowles Center for Dance and the Performing Arts – Minneapolis, Minnesota
- Merce Cunningham Studio – New York City
- Dance Place – Washington, DC
- Dance Theater Workshop (now New York Live Arts) – New York City
- England Studio Theater – Washington, DC
- Joan W. and Irving B. Harris Theater for Music and Dance – Chicago, Illinois
- Jacob's Pillow – Becket, Massachusetts
- Joyce Theater – New York City
- New York Live Arts – New York City
- ODC Theater – San Francisco
- The Performance Garage – Philadelphia, Pennsylvania
