= Petroni =

Petroni is an Italian surname. Notable people with the surname include:

- Bruno Petroni (1941–2014), Italian footballer
- Christian Petroni (born 1984), Italian-American celebrity chef
- Doris Petroni (born 1941), Argentine choreographer, dancer, and teacher
- Girolamo Petroni (died 1591), Italian Roman Catholic bishop
- Giulio Petroni (1917–2010), Italian film director, writer and screenwriter
- Luan Peres Petroni (born 1994), Brazilian footballer
- Michael Petroni, Australian film director and screenwriter
- Pier Paolo Petroni (born 1987), Italian modern pentathlete
- Riccardo Petroni (c. 1250 – 1314), Italian cardinal
- Victor Petroni (born 1959), Canadian soccer player and manager
