= Cecilia Lugo =

Mexican dancer and choreographer

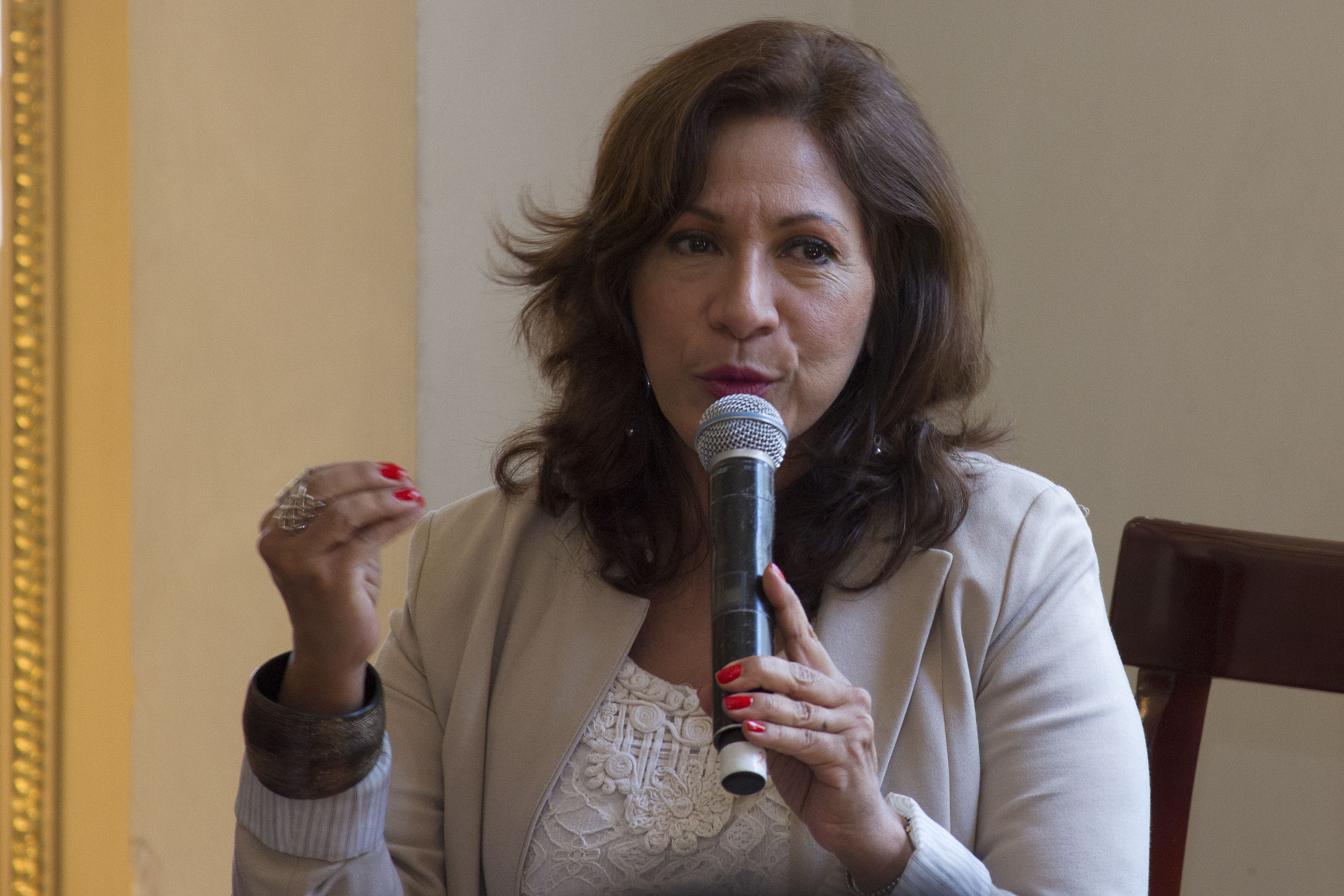
- Born: November 22, 1955 (age 70); Tampico, Mexico
- Education: National Autonomous University of Mexico
- Occupations: Dancer, choreographer
- Awards: José Limón Award

Cecilia Lugo (born November 22, 1955) is a Mexican contemporary dancer and choreographer. She has participated in groups such as INBA's National Dance Company and the Ballet Folklórico de México.

== Career ==
Cecilia Lugo earned a degree in Latin American studies from the National Autonomous University of Mexico (UNAM). Her artistic training is not only related to dance, but to other aspects of the performing arts, including courses in stage lighting and a diploma in theater pedagogy. She has participated in groups such as INBA's National Dance Company and the Ballet Folklórico de México. The creation of her choreography involves Haitian, Mexican, and Arabic music, and genres such as jazz, rock, contemporary, and mambo.

In 1986, she founded the school Contempodanza, with the goal of aiding students to achieve self-knowledge to allow greater personal growth through art.

On May 4, 2011, she received the José Limón National Contemporary Dance Award at the 25th edition of the festival of the same name.

During the cycle "Danza en el palacio: el arte del movimiento" (Dance in the Palace: The Art of Movement) held in July 2011, Cecilia Lugo celebrated 25 years of experience with the performance of En el umbral (On the Threshold; 1987) – as a tribute to Rosario Castellanos – and Memoria de soles (Memory of Suns; 2010).

"Entre viento y marea" (Between Wind and Tide) was the name of the event commemorating Contempodanza's 30th anniversary.

== Awards and recognition ==
- INBA National Choreography Award for the work Memoria de un Soliloquio, 1986
- Member of the first generation of National Fund for Culture and Arts (FONCA) fellows, 1989
- Special mention in the Oscar López contest, Barcelona, 1989
- Fine Arts Medal for Artistic Merit, 2008
- Member of the FONCA National System of Artistic Creators, 1993–1996, 1997–2000, 2003–2006, 2010–2013
- Part of the México en Escena program from the National Council for Culture and Arts (CONACULTA) and FONCA, 2004, 2007, 2009, 2011
- Contempodanza won the grand prix at the New Prague Dance Festival, July 2008
- Guillermina Bravo Award in recognition of her career, October 10, 2008
- José Limón National Contemporary Dance Award, 2011

== Works ==
- Tarde de abanicos (1987)
- Es… Pérez (1988)
- En el umbral (1989)
- La casa del sol (1990)
- Ruptura: tres personajes y el desierto (1991)
- Ave de arena (1992)
