= Cartucho =

1931 novella by Nellie Campobello

- Cover of first Spanish edition (1931); design attributed to Leopoldo Méndez
- Author: Nellie Campobello
- Original title: Cartucho: Relatos de la lucha en el Norte de México
- Translator: Doris Meyer
- Language: Spanish
- Published: 1931 (Spanish first edition) by Ediciones Integrales; 1940 (Spanish revised edition); 1988 (English translation) by the University of Texas Press
- Publication place: Mexico
- ISBN: 9780292711112 (English translation)
- OCLC: 4896987
- OCLC:(Spanish first edition)

Nellie Campobello's Cartucho: Tales of the Struggle in Northern Mexico (Cartucho: Relatos de la lucha en el Norte de México) is a semi-autobiographical short novel or novella set in the Mexican Revolution and originally published in 1931. It consists of a series of vignettes that draw on Campobello's memories of her childhood and adolescence (and the stories her mother told her) in Northern Mexico during the war. Though long overlooked, it is now celebrated, among other reasons because it is, as Mexican critic Elena Poniatowska points out, "the only real vision of the Mexican revolution written by a woman."

== Title ==
"Cartucho" means "cartridge" in Spanish, and refers to the characteristic belts of ammunition worn by Mexican revolutionary soldiers. It also, however, is the nickname of a character introduced in the book's opening vignette. As for the reasons for keeping the Spanish term in the English translation, Campobello's translator explains that "the English equivalent [. . .] has none of the Spanish rhythm and feeling."

== Plot and style ==
The critic Teresa Hurley says of Cartucho that "there is no plot" and points to the book's "unconventional narrative technique and construction." It is non-linear and fragmentary, comprising a series of fifty-six vivid but brief vignettes, "rapid sketches that have the quality of cinematic vision." These episodes are not necessarily in chronological order, and are organized in three sections: "Men of the North"; "The Executed"; and "Under Fire." Collectively, however, they provide a sense of everyday life during the revolution and tell the stories of various "Villistas" (followers of revolutionary leader Pancho Villa) from the perspective of a young girl.

The book brings together not only Campobello's own recollections and personal experience, but also stories she heard from others, above all her mother. As she puts it at one point, these were "stories saved for me, and I never forgot." Moreover, this sense of the book's enshrining a collective memory is accentuated by the inclusion of a number of corridos or popular ballads, of one of which she says: "This song belonged to all of them. They would sing it together, in a circle, with their arms around each other's shoulders." For both individuals and groups, Campobello underlines the importance of memory. As the critic Max Parra puts it, "Cartucho is a book about memory and identity, about memory and survival—individual and collective survival."

Although set in Chihuahua (more specifically, in and around Campobello's childhood hometown of Hidalgo del Parral) in 1916–1920, which was one of the bloodiest places and periods of a revolution that by this stage had degenerated into factionalized struggles between revolutionary groups, the descriptions of the atrocities committed during this time are often very poetic. Of one dead combatant, for instance, Campobello writes of "his body turning cold, the tissue of his porous flesh clutching the bullets that killed him." Max Parra notes that this poetic style incorporates many elements of Mexican oral culture and "an acute sense of rhythm and an appreciation for the materiality of language." He further argues that "at the core of Campobello's narrative poetics lies her penchant for the grotesque." Poniatowska observes that the cumulative effect is that the book's narrator describes the violence "with the delicious freshness of someone watching a great show with neither nostalgia for the past nor plans for the future."

== Publication history ==
The book was first published in 1931, and then republished in a revised and expanded edition with significant changes in 1940, and again (as part of a collected works, Mis libros) in 1960. The first edition was also the first book published by Ediciones Integrales, a publishing house founded in Xalapa, Veracruz, and "dedicated to the publication of antibourgeois, proletarian literature." This first edition came with a preface by List Arzubide, in which he "declares that with Cartucho 'we have learned to read with the eyes of the dead,' that is, from the point of view of the vanquished."

The first edition had thirty-three vignettes; the final version has almost twice that number (one is dropped, twenty-four new ones are added). Among the differences between the various versions are that one of the few women to feature as a central figure in any of the vignettes, one Nacha Ceniceros, ends up executed in the first edition, but in later versions survives to return home, disillusioned by the Revolution's outcome. Feminist critic Tabea Linhard argues that changes such as this one might be explained by the notion that Campobello "revised her novel in order to present a more acceptable, more feminine, and also more domesticated novel." Linhard further suggests that "the differences between these two versions reveal the ways in which fearless women like Nacha Ceniceros are assimilated into the Mexican literary landscape."

== Critical reception ==
On its initial publication, the book was somewhat overlooked, in part because Campobello was marginalized as a Villista at a time when most of the literature and films of the Revolution were openly against Pancho Villa. Still, Max Parra argues that critical reception was favourable among "the small world of Mexico City's intellectual community" and quotes the 1935 assessment of Berta Gamboa de Camino, who described the book as "alive and real, breathing, full of human feeling and deep pathos."

Moreover, due to its distinctive style and testimonial impact, as well as the fact that it is the only major portrayal of the Revolution written by a woman, Cartucho has increasingly been recognized as a major literary work from this era.

Many critics have noted that (as Vicky Unruh puts it), the book is "the only novel of the Mexican revolution of its generation written by a woman," one of the very few contributions by a woman to the otherwise male-dominated subgenre of the "novel of the revolution." Campobello is the only woman author discussed in Antonio Castro Leal's La novela de la Revolución mexicana (1958–1960), and the only woman author included in Gamboa de Camino's canonical Antología de la Novela de la Revolución Mexicana (for which Castro Leal also provided a foreword). As Maricruz Castro Ricalde points out, this "helped establish the idea that women either were not interested in a topic that was alien to their sensibilities or were unable to produce any texts worthy of being remembered. Aiming to counteract this impression, feminist critics have therefore been drawn to Campobello's text.

As for the book's legacy, and stressing its "testimonial features," Jane Elizabeth Lavery contends that "Nellie Campobello can be seen as the outstanding precursor of testimonial writers such as Elena Garro, Elena Poniatowska, and Ángeles Mastretta." The critic Jorge Aguilar Mora, on the other hand, argues that Juan Rulfo's renowned Pedro Páramo "would not have been possible without Nellie Campobello's Cartucho."

== Bibliography ==
- Aguilar Mora, Jorge (2000), "El Silencio de Nellie Campobello" (PDF), Revista Andina de Letras (12): 55–78.
- Campobello, Nellie (1988), Cartucho and My Mother's Hands, translated by Doris Meyer, Austin: University of Texas Press, ISBN 978-0-292-71111-2.
- Castro Ricalde, Maricruz (2015), "Women Writers in the Revolution: Regional Socialist Realism", in Rodríguez, Ileana; Szurmuk, Mónica (eds.), The Cambridge History of Latin American Women's Literature, Cambridge: Cambridge University Press, pp. 211–227, doi:10.1017/CHO9781316050859.016, ISBN 978-1-107-08532-9.
- Esplin, Emron (15 December 2020), "Teaching Cartucho and Nellie Campobellos Goal of Restoring Pancho Villa to Mexican History", in Martínez, Elizabeth Coonrod (ed.), Teaching Late-Twentieth-Century Mexicana and Chicana Writers, Modern Language Association, ISBN 978-1-60329-510-9
- Hurley, Teresa (2003), Mothers and Daughters in Post-Revolutionary Mexican Literature, Woodbridge: Tamesis, ISBN 978-1-85566-090-8.
- Lavery, Jane Elizabeth (2005), Ángeles Mastretta: Textual Multiplicity, Woodbridge: Tamesis, ISBN 978-1-85566-117-2.
- Linhard, Tabea (2005), Fearless Women in the Mexican Revolution and the Spanish Civil War, Columbia: University of Missouri Press, ISBN 978-0-8262-6498-5.
- Meyer, Doris (1988), "Translator's Note", Cartucho and My Mother's Hands, Austin: University of Texas Press, pp. 2–3, ISBN 978-0-292-71111-2.
- Parra, Max (2010), Writing Pancho Villa's Revolution: Rebels in the Literary Imagination of Mexico, Austin: University of Texas Press.
- Poniatowska, Elena (1988), "Introduction", Cartucho and My Mother's Hands, Austin: University of Texas Press, pp. vii–xiv, ISBN 978-0-292-71111-2.
- Unruh, Vicky (2009), Performing Women and Modern Literary Culture in Latin America: Intervening Acts, Austin: University of Texas Press, ISBN 978-0-292-79616-4.
