= Donlon =

Donlon may refer to:

== People ==
- Alphonsus J. Donlon (1867–1923), American Jesuit priest
- Billy Donlon (born 1977), American college basketball coach
- Chris Donlon (born 1977), Australian rules football field umpire
- Denise Donlon (born 1956), Canadian executive, television producer, television host
- Dolores Donlon (1920–2012), American model and actress
- Marguerite Donlon (born 1966), Irish dancer, choreographer and ballet director
- Mary H. Donlon (1893–1977), American lawyer and politician
- Peter Donlon (1906–1979), American rower
- Roger Donlon (1934–2024), retired United States Army officer

== Places ==
- Mary Donlon Hall, a residence hall located on Cornell North Campus
