= Pazik (surname) =

Pazik is a surname. Notable people with the surname include:

- Kristen Pazik (born 1978), American and British model
- Mike Pazik (born 1950), American baseball player
- Tom Pazik (1940–1993), American dancer
