= Pedro Alvarado =

Pedro Alvarado may refer to:

- Pedro Alvarado (miner), Mexican mining magnate and philanthropist
- Pedro de Alvarado (c. 1485–1541), Spanish conquistador and governor of Guatemala
