= Elisa Griensen =

Mexican patriot (1888 - 1972)

- Born: María Elisa Martiniana Griensen Zambrano; 2 January 1888; Hidalgo del Parral, Chihuahua
- Died: 14 November 1972 (aged 84); Ciudad Juárez, Chihuahua
- Spouse: Óscar Martínez
- Parent(s): María Lucía Zambrano; Juan Griensen

María Elisa Martiniana Griensen Zambrano, known as Elisa Griensen (2 January 1888 – 14 November 1972) was a Mexican patriot who fought against the army of the United States during the Pancho Villa Expedition.

== Biography ==
Elisa Griensen was the daughter of Juan G. Gruñesen and María Lucía Zambrano. Griensen's father was of French origin, born in Alsace around 1828. He arrived in Mexico on an unknown date through the Tampico, although it is unknown whether he arrived before or after the Second French intervention in Mexico. Her mother was originally from Chihuahua, and of Spanish origin.

Griensen was the penultimate of eight siblings. Her father died in 1891, at the age of 63, and her mother in 1892, at the age of 44, leaving their nine orphaned children when Elisa was barely four years old. Her older sister, Virginia, took care of them all.

A couple of years later, in 1894, her sister Virginia married Pedro Alvarado, a mining businessman in the region. Alvarado's mining business provided sufficient income to increase the economic comfort of the family.

== Act of heroism ==
Griensen rose to prominence during the Pancho Villa Expedition, which was intended to capture Francisco Villa in response to his attack on Columbus in New Mexico.

This expedition began in March 1916 and had up to 15,000 soldiers. A month later, on April 12, a part of the expedition arrived in Parral, Chihuahua, which was commanded by Major Frank Tompkins, who had to remain on the outskirts of the city; however, against the orders received, he entered it. General Ismael Lozano, commander of the Mexican military detachment in the city, asked him to leave.

The inhabitants of the city were in disagreement with the occupation of the American soldiers and began to gather expressing their discontent. Griensen, who at the time was 28 years old and studying in the United States, was on vacation and was among the protesters. Seeing that no one was taking any action, Griensen demanded that the city's mayor, José de la Luz Herrera, take the initiative to drive the Americans out of the city. Unsuccessful in her attempt, Griensen asked for support from the people around her, and took the national flag from a nearby school. She rallied some of the older school children to her side.

He buscado ayuda y no me han secundado; sin embargo... alguien tiene que hacer algo. (English: I have sought help and they have not supported me; however... someone has to do something)
Elisa Griensen, April 1916

Along with the children and some women, Griensen headed toward the US troops. The crowd followed her, shouting cheers of support for Villa and Mexico. During the march, she took a Mauser rifle from the armory and addressed Major Tompkins, asking him to leave. The crowd became restless, and children began to throw stones at the troops. Griensen fired the first shots with her rifle. The troops began to quickly withdraw, followed by protestors and Mexican soldiers. During the retreat, two American soldiers were killed. Several, including Tompkins, were wounded.

John J. Pershing cited this incident as one of the failures of the expedition.

=== Discrepancies and other versions ===
==== Student versions ====
Edgar Kock, a former student of Escuela Oficial 99, assured that those who started the revolt against the Tompkins troop were he and his classmates and not Elisa Griensen, as described in the official version of events. In his story Griensen would have only taken part once the troops had started to withdraw.

Three other former students of the school, Santiago Jáquez, Maximiano Fraire and Rafael Sepúlveda, have narrated their own version of the events. They agree on some events, such as the fact that Griensen was encouraging the people to rebel while driving a car, and that the population in general disagreed with the occupation. They also disagree on some facts, such as when describing whether or not Griensen carried a weapon when driving the vehicle. However, these versions coincide with that of Edgar Cock when mentioning that it was the students of the school who started the revolt against the US troops (with shouts, cheers and stones) and not Elisa Griensen.

==== Version of Frank Tompkins ====
Major Frank Tompkins, the head of the expedition in Hidalgo del Parral, recounted the experience in that city not as a demonstration of the population against the presence of his troops, but as a battle against the Mexican troops on the outskirts from the city.

Tompkins mentioned being invited by Captain Antonio Meza. He relates having talked with the commander of the military garrison, General Ismael Lozano, and agreeing to withdraw as soon as supplies were delivered. However, as he was leaving the city, he and his troops were attacked by the population, which, in his opinion, was led by a man of German appearance. He considered that attack in the main square an ambush by General Lozano with the help of the population.

He later authored a book titled Chasing Villa: The Story Behind the Story of Pershing's Expedition Into Mexíco; in it, he makes no mention of Griensen.

== Later life and death ==
Griensen married Óscar Martínez, a civil engineer who graduated from the Heroic Military Academy in 1928. They had a daughter, Delia Rosario Martínez Griensen.

In September 1972, Griensen was in the city of El Paso, Texas, when a respiratory illness turned into pneumonia. At her request, she was transferred to Ciudad Juárez, Chihuahua, where she died a few weeks later on November 14 at the age of 84.

== Bibliography ==
- Camacho Griensen, Armando (2001). Elisa Griensen y la nueva Expedición Punitiva en Parral ([1.] ed.). [Chihuahua, Chihuahua, México]: A. Camacho Griensen. ISBN 9789709294507.
- Camacho Griensen, Armando (2007). Elisa Griensen Zambrano : el heroísmo de una mujer y el villismo desafiaron al ejército estadounidense ([1.] ed.). [México, D.F.]: Gernika. ISBN 9789706370860.
- Taibo II, Paco Ignacio (2006). Pancho Villa : una biografía narrativa (1. ed.). Mexico, D.F.: Planeta. ISBN 9789703703340.

== Filmography ==
- Congreso del Estado de Chihuahua (2006). Vida Y Obra De Elisa Griensen [Life and Work of Elisa Griensen] (Documentary) (in Spanish). Mexico.
