= Guillermo Arriaga Fernández =

Mexican dancer, choreographer and composer

- Born: July 4, 1926; Mexico City, Mexico
- Died: January 3, 2014 (aged 87); Mexico City, Mexico
- Occupations: Dancer, choreographer, composer
- Years active: 1956–2014
- Awards: José Limón Award (1996)

Guillermo Arriaga Fernández (July 4, 1926 – January 3, 2014) was a Mexican dancer, choreographer and composer.

In 1996, he received the José Limón National Dance Award.

Guillermo Arriaga Fernández died from pneumonia on January 3, 2014, aged 87, in his hometown of Mexico City.

== Works Created ==
He created over three hundred short choreographies for television series, as well as more than sixty works for folkloric dance groups. He also choreographed for theater, opera, and cinema. Some of his notable works include:

- El sueño y la presencia (1951), with music by Blas Galindo.
- Balada mágica (1952), with music by Carlos Jiménez Mabarak.
- Zapata (1953), with music by José Pablo Moncayo.
- Antesala, with music by Eduardo Hernández Moncada.
- Romances y fronteras (1954).
- Cuauhtémoc (1956).
- Feria y fauno (1956).
