= Noemi Lapzeson =

Argentine dancer, choreographer, and educator

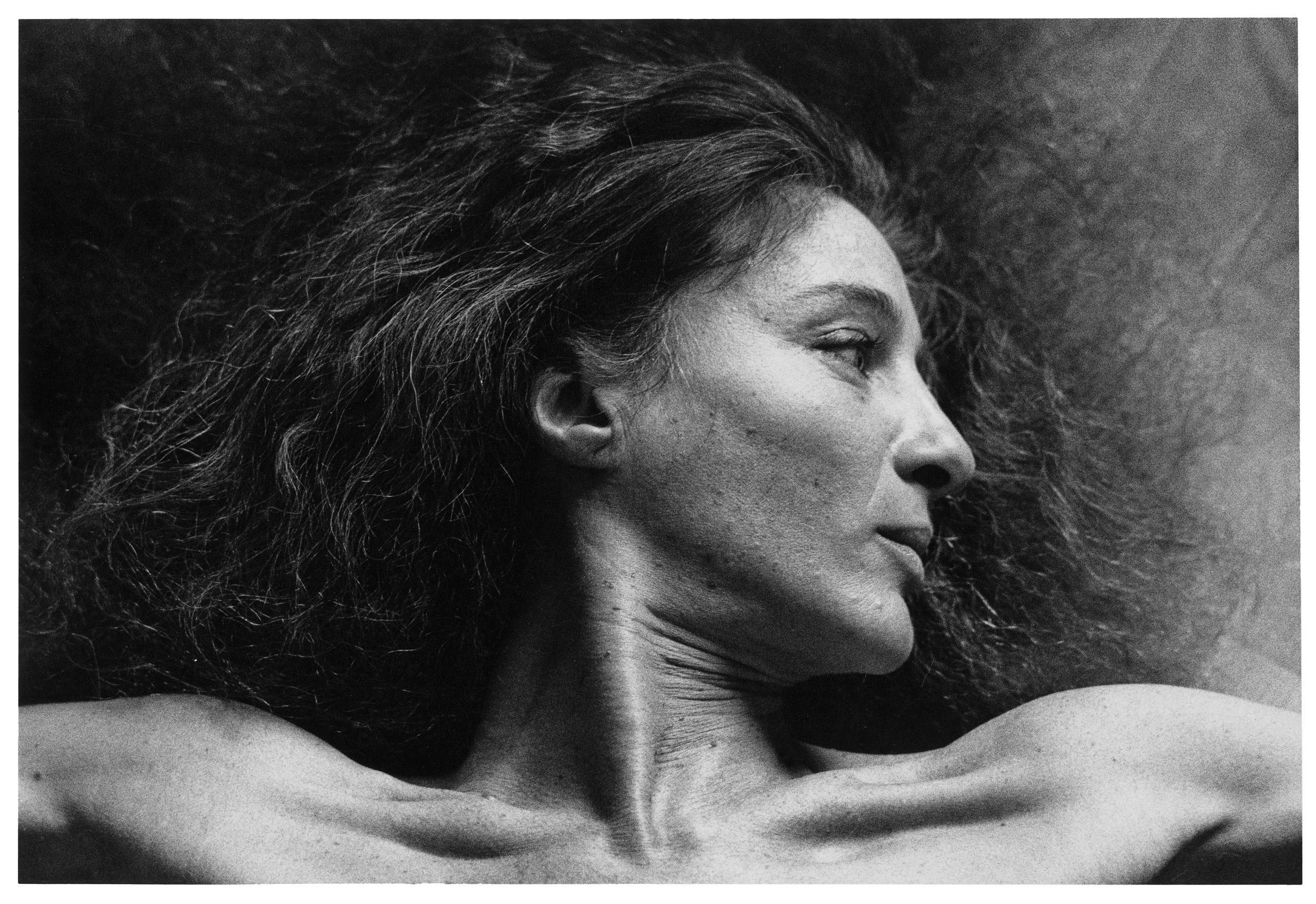
- Born: 28 June 1940; Buenos Aires, Argentina
- Died: 11 January 2018 (aged 77); Geneva, Switzerland
- Occupations: dancer, choreographer, educator

Noemi Lia Lapzeson (28 June 1940, Buenos Aires, Argentina – 11 January 2018, Geneva, Switzerland) was an Argentine dancer, choreographer and educator. She received a Guggenheim Fellowship for the field of choreography in 1999.

In 2002 Lapzeson was the first recipient of the Swiss Prize for Dance.

== Life ==
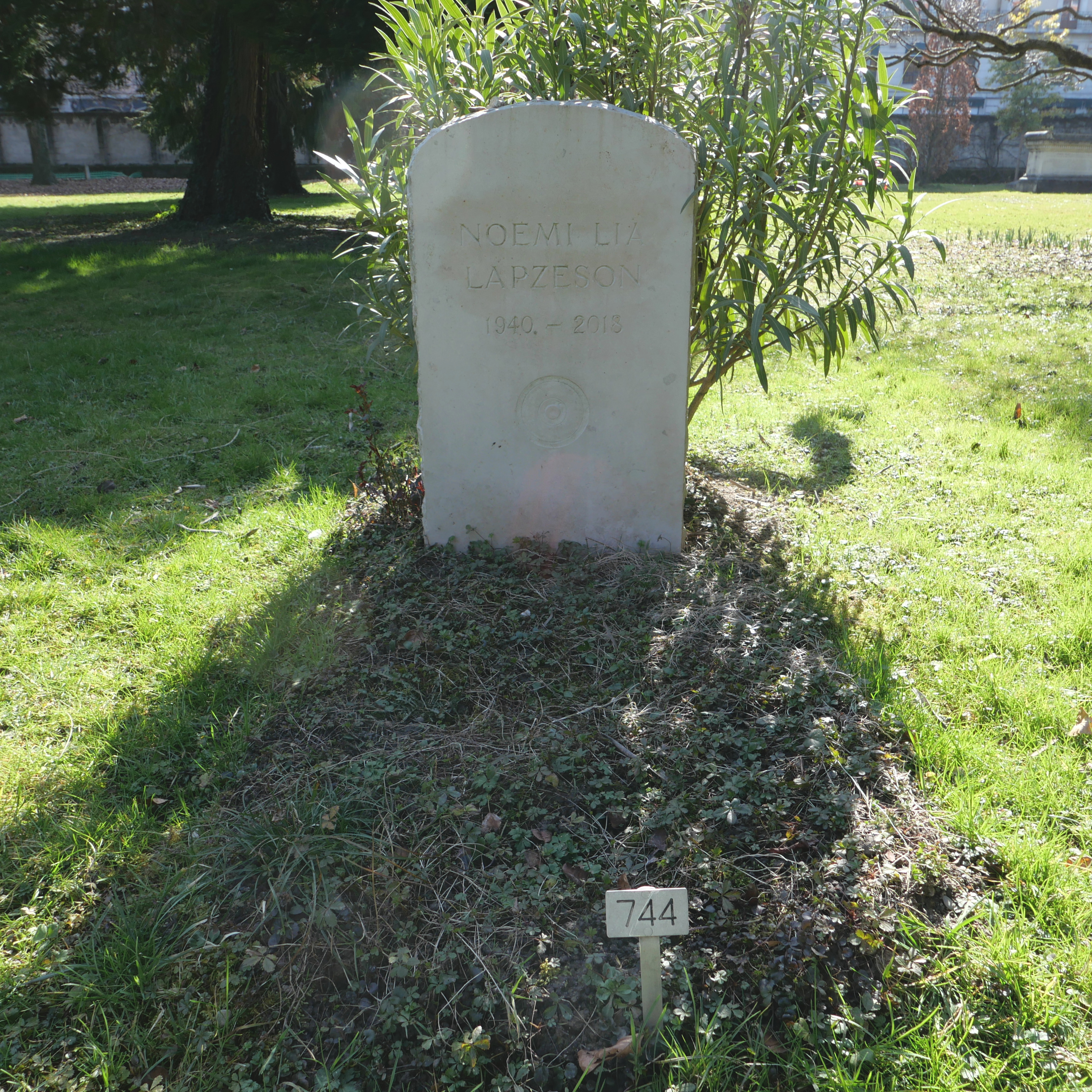
Lapzeson's grave

Lapzeson as a child began to study movement through the Jaques-Dalcroze method. When she was 14 her mother brought her to study with Ana Itelman.

She won a scholarship from the Juilliard School. There she studied classical dance, but she returned to contemporary dance in order to study under American teacher Martha Graham. By the age of 19 she danced and was a teacher at Graham's dance company in New York. Lapzeson helped to create the London Contemporary Dance School in 1968.

In Geneva, Noemi Lapsezon taught Technique corporelle in the Institute Jaques-Dalcroze. She was also instrumental in the creation of the ADC (Association of Contemporary Dance for its acronym in French). She is said to be a pioneer for contemporary dance in Geneva.

Lapzeson is buried at the Cimetière des Rois (Cemetery of Kings), which is considered the Genevan Panthéon.
