= Doris Petroni =

- Born: Doris Beatriz Petroni; 4 December 1941 (age 84); Teodelina, Argentina
- Education: National School of Dance
- Occupations: Choreographer, dancer, teacher
- Spouse: Oscar Cardozo Ocampo
- Awards: Hugo Musical Theater Award (2017)

Doris Beatriz Petroni (born 4 December 1941) is an Argentine choreographer, dancer, and dance teacher. She was married to the musician and arranger Oscar Cardozo Ocampo until his death in 2001.

== Career ==
Doris Petroni studied at the National School of Dance, where she obtained her teaching degree. She then continued her artistic training in dance with teachers such as María Ruanova, Paulina Ossona, Luisa Grinberg, Ana Itelman, and Renate Schotteluis, and in the theater with Ricardo Bartis, Beatriz Mattar, and Agustín Alezzo.

She was part of several stable groups, such as those of Renate Shottelius and Jorge Tomín. She joined the Contemporary Ballet of the Teatro General San Martín (under the direction of Oscar Araiz), and subsequently, from 1990 to 1997, coordinated it with him.

Petroni participated in the Friends of Dance and Open Dance Group and choreographed countless plays, as well as television shows such as La culpa fue de Gardel, Prohibido pisar el Tango, and Las tres medias de Andrés. She contributed to the television programs of Nicolás Repetto (in Paraguay) and Alejandro Dolina. She was a teacher at the National School of the Arts and at the Teatro Colón, and conducts workshops specializing in movement techniques.

== Reviews ==
In his review of the production of The Trojan Women, with choreography and direction by Oscar Araiz, Néstor Tirri notes:

The final reference goes to Doris Petroni, legendary dancer of the first companies of Araiz of the sixties, who...takes on Hecuba with her scenic authority and with a quality of movement consistent with the dramatic intensity of the role.

== Awards ==
Petroni was nominated for the ACE Award for the best choreography of the 2002–2003 season. In 2017 she won the Hugo Musical Theater Award for Best Choreography for Vivitos y coleando 2.

== Works ==
=== Shows ===
==== Choreographer ====
- Vivitos y Coleando
- Danza de verano
- Hoy bailongo hoy
- El grito pelado
- La ópera del mendigo
- Locos ReCuerdos
- Viejos conocidos
- El patio de la Morocha
- Trescientas millones
- Reminiscencias
- Tangán
- Petra (...de los emigrados)
- Ballet Orion
- Amigos de la Danza

==== Assistant choreographer ====
- Las mil y una nachas

==== Author ====
- Petra (...de los emigrados)

==== Dancer ====
- Ciudad nuestra Buenos Aires

==== Body trainer ====
- Babilonia

==== Performer ====
- Fedra
- Casa de puertas
- El puente de los suspiros
- Conferencia
- Suite de Tangos
- Crónicas momentáneas
- 2 x 2 tangos
- Doble tres
- Odi et amo
- Casa de puertas

==== Narrator ====
- El puente de los suspiros

==== Assistant director ====
- Guia orquestal para la juventud
- Pedro y el lobo
- 2 x 2 tangos
- Novena partida de ajedrez: fischer-petrosian

=== Films ===
==== Performer ====
- La playa del amor (1979)
- Tango Bar (1989)

==== Choreographer ====
- La magia de Los Parchís (1981)
