= Waldeen Falkenstein =

- Waldeen Falkenstein, from a 1933 publication
- Born: February 1, 1913; Dallas, United States
- Died: August 18, 1993 (aged 80); Cuernavaca, Mexico
- Awards: José Limón Award (1988)

Waldeen (von) Falkenstein Brooke de Zatz better known as "Waldeen" (February 1, 1913 – August 18, 1993) was an American-born dancer and choreographer. Together with Anna Sokolow, Alicia Markova, Anton Dolin and Michel Descombey, she belongs to the great precursors of modern Mexican dance.

== Biography ==
Waldeen was born in Dallas. Her father, an engraver, and her mother, a pianist, greatly encouraged Waldeen to explore the arts from a young age. Due to this, among other influences, she developed a dream of becoming a ballet dancer, and said she never wanted to do anything else. She spent the better part of her youth training under Theodore Kosloff in Los Angeles, where he recognized her talent early and invited her to tour with his ballet company. Her first solo performance, done at age 13, was for the Los Angeles Opera Company. She joined the Japanese choreographer Seki Sano when he moved to Mexico. She taught and performed in Los Angeles in the early 1930s. She returned to Mexico with the dancer Winifred Widener to Mexico City in 1939, where they danced at the theater of fine arts (Spanish: Teatro de Bellas Artes). She was ordered to establish the Ballet de Bellas Artes, the ballet group of the theater, which she led until it was dissolved in 1947. At this time she had also an affair with Bodo Uhse and lived together with him, before he married Alma Agee.

Waldeen married Rodolfo Valencia, a theater director, and was invited by the revolutionary government of Cuba, where she stood from 1962 to 1965. In 1966 she established a further ballet company, known as the "Waldeen Ballet". Notable dancers of the company were Guillermina Bravo and Ana Mérida.

In 1988, she received the inaugural José Limón National Dance Award.

She died in Cuernavaca.
