= Hidalgo del Parral Municipality =

Municipality in the Mexican state of Chihuahua

Hidalgo del Parral
- Municipality
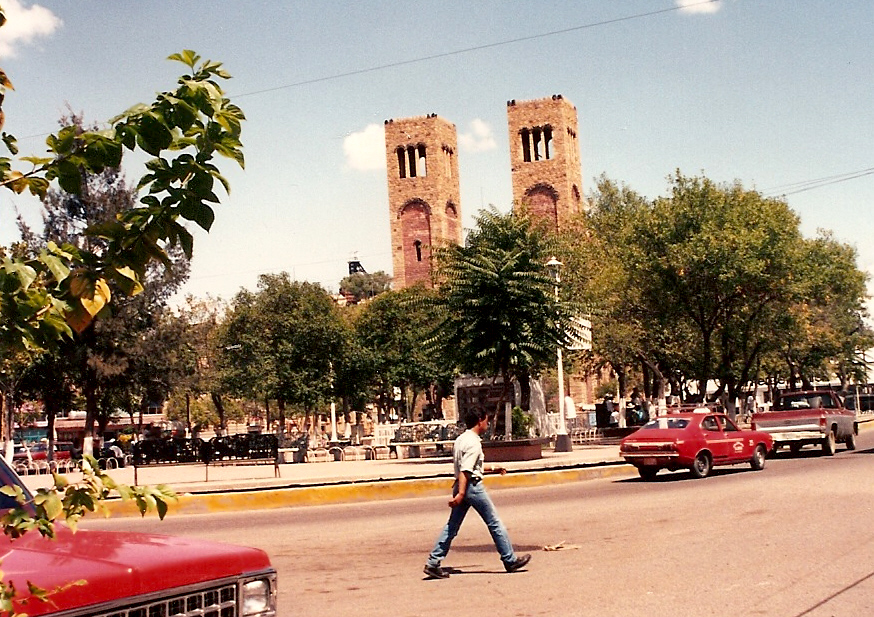
- Parral city, seat of the municipality

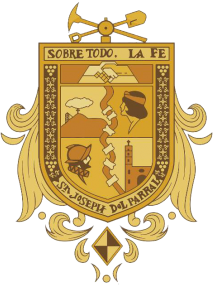
- Coat of arms

- Municipality of Hidalgo del Parral in Chihuahua

- Location in Mexico
- Coordinates: 26°56′N 105°40′W
- Country: Mexico
- State: Chihuahua
- Municipal seat: Hidalgo del Parral

Area
  - Total: 1,751 km^{2} (676 sq mi)

Population (2010)
  - Total: 107,061

Hidalgo del Parral is one of the 67 municipalities of Chihuahua, in northern Mexico. The municipal seat lies at Hidalgo del Parral (Parral City). The municipality covers an area of 1,751 km^{2}.

As of 2010, the municipality had a total population of 107,061, up from 103,519 as of 2005.

As of 2010, the city of Hidalgo del Parral had a population of 104,836. Other than the city of Hidalgo del Parral, the municipality had 192 localities, none of which had a population over 1,000.

== Geography ==
=== Towns and villages ===
The municipality has 112 localities. The largest are:

Name	Population (2005)
Hidalgo del Parral	101,147
Maclovio Herrera	141
El Cobeño	123
La Esmeralda	113
Minas Nuevas	43
Total Municipality	103,519
