= Linda Diamond =

American choreographer

Linda Diamond is an American choreographer whose modern dance company, the Linda Diamond Dance Ensemble, performs both her own works and those of Anna Sokolow.

== Career ==
The company performs in New York City and upstate New York regularly. Her weekly program Diamond Dance views is on woodstocktv.org Saturdays ll to noon EST. and co-produces the Woodstock Diamond Dance Festival. Her theatre there is called the Woodstock Diamond Sokolow Dance Theatre, and she also operates her own dance academy at that location. The Linda Diamond & Co. performs in New York City and upstate New York and is based at the Diamond Sokolow Dance Studio on West 51st Street where studio performances take place.

She is a choreographer whose training was with Martha Graham Studio of Dance, Merce Cunningham, Alvin Ailey American Dance Theatre, Bertram Ross, Pearl Lang, Stuart Hodes, Anna Sokolow, and Nenette Charisse. In 2004 Diamond had the unveiling of Anna Sokolow Way, the street naming of Christopher Street, officiated by the NYC Department of Cultural Affairs under Mayor Bloomberg. This was the first time an American woman choreographer has been honored posthumously with a street naming in New York City.

== See also ==
- List of choreographers
