= Martín Luis Guzmán =

Mexican novelist and journalist (1887–1976)

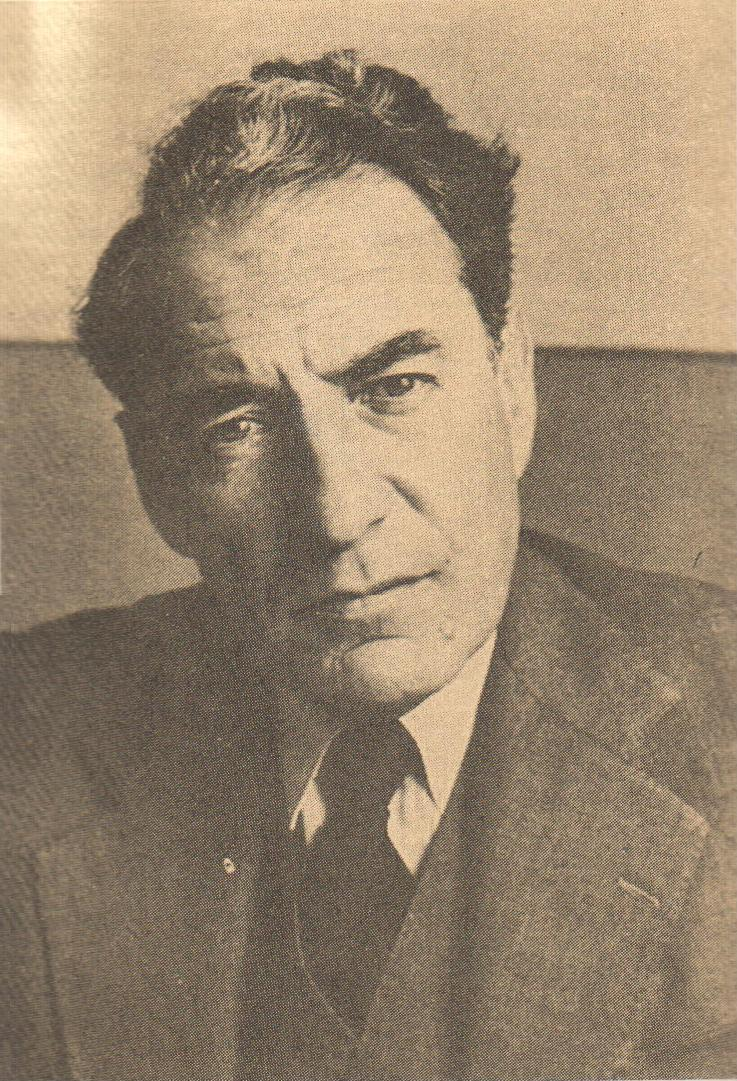
Martín Luis Guzmán.

Martín Luis Guzmán Franco (October 6, 1887 – December 22, 1976) was a Mexican novelist and journalist. Along with Mariano Azuela and Nellie Campobello, he is considered a pioneer of the revolutionary novel, a genre inspired by the experiences of the Mexican Revolution of 1910. He spent periods in exile in the United States and Spain. He founded newspapers, weekly magazines, and publishing companies. In 1958, he was awarded Mexico's National Prize in Literature.

== Life ==
Guzmán was born in Chihuahua, Chihuahua, the son of a colonel in the Federal Army, who was attached to the Mexican consulate in Phoenix, Arizona, U.S. His father was killed in one of the early skirmishes of the Mexican Revolution and Guzmán left for Mexico City.

For several months in 1914, he was under the direct orders of General Francisco "Pancho" Villa, later writing a five-volume biography of Villa, Memorias de Pancho Villa (1936–1951). On Villa's orders, Guzmán witnessed the entry of Venustiano Carranza's Constitutionalist Army to Mexico City, following the fall of Victoriano Huerta's government in July 1914. Carranza had him jailed, since as an adherent of Villa, formerly a Constitutionalist general who had broken with Carranza, Guzmán was a political enemy. He was released during the factional dispute between the Constitutionalists and the Army of the Convention, led by Villa. Guzmán went abroad to Paris and Madrid in 1914, where he began writing articles for the Spanish weekly magazine, España, founded by José Ortega y Gasset, and became part of the circle of Spanish intellectuals. His first published work, La querella de México, was his assessment of Mexico's problems and limitations. Leaving Spain for the United States, he represented España and taught a short course at University of Minnesota, returning to Mexico briefly, where he worked at Mexican newspapers. Following the ouster of Carranza in 1920 by Sonoran generals Alvaro Obregón, Plutarco Elías Calles, and Adolfo de la Huerta, Guzmán returned to Mexico and became the private secretary to Alberto J. Pani, President Obregón's minister of foreign affairs. Guzmán was involved in the 1921 centenary of the achievement of Mexico's independence. He subsequently ran afoul of Obregón's government when Obregón sought to impose Calles as his successor. Guzmán backed Adolfo de la Huerta's 1923 unsuccessful rebellion against Obregón and Calles, and was forced into exile to Spain for a decade, becoming a Spanish citizen. He again became involved in journalism, but his largest contribution to writing was his work of revolutionary fiction, El águila y la serpiente. With the presidency of Lázaro Cárdenas (1934–40), who had turned against his political patron Calles, Guzmán was invited to return to Mexico, where he returned to journalism and began writing Memorias de Pancho Villa.

Martin Luis Guzmán was a public figure in Mexico: he was elected to the Chamber of Deputies for the Federal District's 6th congressional district in 1922 and served as a senator for the Federal District from 1970 to 1976. He was also a member of the Mexican Academy of Language.

He died suddenly on December 22, 1976, in Mexico City due an acute myocardial infarction. His widow Ana West died seven years after him, on October 21, 1983. She was 95 years old when, after being hospitalized for some days due to an acute bilateral pneumonia, she suffered a cardiac arrest and died.

== Works ==
His novels La sombra del caudillo (1929) and El águila y la serpiente (1928) depict the Mexican Revolution and its political aftermath, with both of which the author was familiar, having contributed both to revolutionary agitation and to the formation of the new revolutionary government.

- La querella de México (1915)
- A orillas del Hudson (1920)
- El águila y la serpiente (1928)
- La sombra del caudillo (1929)
- Aventuras democráticas (1931)
- Mina al mozo: Héroe de Navarra (1932)
- Filadelfia: Paraíso de conspiradores (1933)
- Kinchil (1946)
- Memorias de Pancho Villa (1951)
- Apunte sobre una personalidad (1954)
- Muertes Históricas (1958)
- Islas Marías, novela y drama (1959)
- Pábulo para la historia (1961)
- Necesidad de cumplir las Leyes de Reforma (1963)
- Febrero de 1913 (1963)
- Crónica de mi destierro (1964)

== See also ==
- Politics in fiction

== Sources ==
- Encyclopædia Britannica
