= José Limón National Contemporary Dance Award =

Mexican dance award

- Named for José Limón
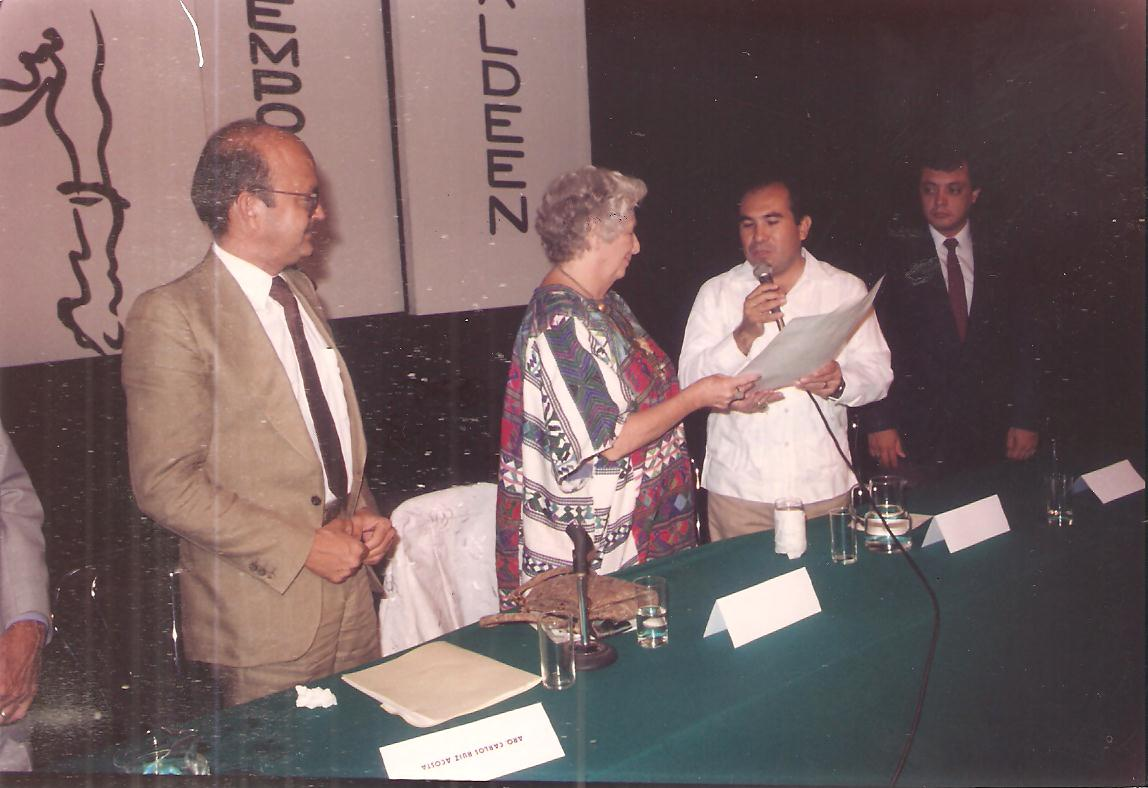
- Waldeen accepting the inaugural award
- Awarded for: Modern and contemporary dance
- Sponsored by: Government of Sinaloa; National Council for Culture and the Arts
- Country: Mexico
- First award: 1988

The José Limón National Contemporary Dance Award (Spanish: Premio Nacional de Danza Contemporánea José Limón) is a Mexican modern and contemporary dance award established in 1988 and named in honor of the dancer and choreographer José Limón. It is granted by the National Council for Culture and the Arts (CONACULTA) and the government of the state of Sinaloa. Due to its age and significance, it is considered the country's most important dance award.

== History and description ==
The José Limón National Dance Award was established in 1988 to recognize the most outstanding figures of modern and contemporary Mexican or foreign dance. It was named in honor of José Limón, a dancer and choreographer born in Culiacán, Sinaloa, considered a groundbreaking innovator in the history of contemporary dance, and one who elevated the male figure in the field. At its 30th edition, held in 2010, the award's name was changed to the José Limón National Contemporary Dance Award.

It is granted by CONACULTA and the government of the state of Sinaloa, through the National Dance Coordination of the National Institute of Fine Arts and the Sinaloense Institute of Culture. The distinction, considered the country's most important in the medium, is awarded each year during the José Limón International Contemporary Dance Festival, to people or institutions whose work in modern and contemporary dance constitutes a significant contribution to this art in Mexico.

To commemorate the 100th anniversary of Limón's birth, six awards were presented in 2008. In addition, a person who was not a dancer or choreographer was recognized for the first time – academic Alberto Dallal received an award as one of the most outstanding dance researchers and historians in Mexico.

== Recipients ==
- 1988: Waldeen
- 1989: Guillermina Bravo
- 1990: Raúl Flores Canelo
- 1991: Manuel Hiram
- 1992: Lila López
- 1993: Luis Fandiño
- 1994: Valentina Castro
- 1995: Xavier Francis
- 1996: Guillermo Arriaga
- 1997: Cora Flores
- 1998: Rosa Reyna
- 1999: Federico Castro
- 2000: Antonia Quiroz
- 2001: Rossana Filomarino
- 2002: Rocío Sagaón
- 2003: Jaime Blanc
- 2004: Ballet Teatro del Espacio
- 2005: Miguel Ángel Palmeros
- 2006: Graciela Henríquez
- 2007: Victoria Camero
- 2008: Isabel Beteta, Marta Bracho, Alberto Dallal, Guillermo Maldonado, Pilar Medina, Lidya Romero
- 2009: Lucy Arce
- 2010: Leticia Alvarado, Jorge Domínguez
- 2011: Cecilia Lugo
- 2012: Marco Antonio Silva
- 2013: Margarita Tortajada Quiróz
- 2014: Anadel Lynton
- 2015: Cecilia Appleton
- 2016: Norma Adriana Castaños Celaya
- 2017: Rosario Manzanos
- 2018: Miguel Mancillas
- 2019: Laura Rocha
