= Jeanne Ruddy =

American dancer and choreographer

- Born: Miami, Florida, United States
- Occupations: Choreographer, artistic director, dancer, educator, and founder

Jeanne Ruddy is an American dancer, choreographer, artistic director, educator, writer and founder and collaborator of multiple dance projects. She danced with the Martha Graham Dance Company in New York City and later began the Jeanne Ruddy Dance Company in Philadelphia, Pennsylvania.

== Early life ==
Jeanne Ruddy was born and raised in Miami, Florida. Her dance education began at the Sacred and Contemporary Dance Guild of Miami under the direction of Diana Avery in Miami, Florida 1966–1970, performing in Arts and Holiday Festivals, Coconut Grove Happenings, churches and synagogues, and theaters. Jeanne Ruddy went on to earn her Bachelor of Fine Arts degree from North Carolina School of the Arts. (1971–1973) She went on to dance with the Martha Graham Dance Company (1976–1986). She earned her Masters in Arts from New York University, with a concentration in Dance History and Writing (1988–1990).

== Martha Graham Dance Company ==
Jeanne Ruddy was a Principal Dancer with the Martha Graham Company. She performed lead roles in Graham works. In Andromache's Lament her performance was reviewed "Jeanne Ruddy and Jean-Louis Morin made Andromache and Hector attractive young people in Andromache's Lament. Miss Ruddy even looked as poised and glamorous as a fashion model at the start of the piece." Flute of Pan, Diversion of Angels, Deaths and Entrances, Seraphic Dialogue, Clyemnestra, Cortege of Eagles, Embattled Garden, Herodiade and Appalachian Spring. In the Cave of the Heart Ruddy danced in the role of The Chorus, which was reviewed as having been "danced with compellingly troubled warmth and delicacy by Jeanne Ruddy."

In a letter to the editor Ruddy described what it was to dance for Martha Graham, "To live as a dancer in her company was to suspend oneself from an everyday reality – she demanded total commitment, complete discipline."

As a Principal Dancer Ruddy performed on Broadway, at Lincoln Center, the Metropolitan and Paris Opéra houses; toured the US, Europe, Canada, Mexico, the Mid-East. Filmed N.E.T. Great Performances and Dance in America. She also danced on Broadway in The King and I, starring Yul Brynner, and was an original member of Agnes de Mille's Heritage Dance Theatre.

== Academic career ==
Jeanne Ruddy directed the Graham-based modern department at The Alvin Ailey American Dance Center from 1986 to 1995. She was a faculty member at The Juilliard School from 1987 to 1998. In addition to her work in New York, Jeanne Ruddy has been invited to numerous international symposiums: the Congress of the Dance in Rio de Janeiro, Brazil; the International Sommerakademie des Tanzes in Cologne, Germany; and the American Dance Festival in Moscow, Russia, where she was the first to teach the Martha Graham technique to an advanced group of Russian artists after Russia opened in 1993. She has been a guest artist where she taught and choreographed in many of the U.S. leading colleges and universities of dance, such as Sarah Lawrence College, Connecticut College, and Florida State University. Jeanne Ruddy's diverse opportunities inform her as an artist, and contributed to her work as a creator of dance pieces. Her experiences inspired her to find ways of sharing dance with broader communities.

== Choreography ==
- Game Drive 2012, Music: Jennifer Higdon's Zaka
- MonTage a Troi 2011, Music: Claude Debussy, Erik Satie, Igor Stravinsky
- Lark 2009, Music: Ellen Fishman-Johnson
- Oceans 1: Wetlands 2007, Music: Ellen Fishman-Johnson
- Woa Cholena 2006, Music: Igor Stravinsky
- Breathless 2005, Original Soundscore: Jorge Cousineau
- Out of the Mist, Above the Real 2004, Music: Daniel Brewbaker
- Falling In.... 2004 Music, Nigel Kennedy, Joni Mitchell, Fado
- Significant Soil (second movmt) 2003, Music: Philip Glass
- Both Sides Now 2002, Music: Joni Mitchell
- Suite Reel 2001, Music: Traditional Bluegrass & Barbershop songs
- Significant Soil 2000, Music: Philip Glass
- Waiting 1997, Music: Michael Torke
- The Good-bye 1992, Music: Frédéric Chopin
- Adolphis Point 1992, Music: Greg Presley
- Three 1991, Music: Béla Bartók
- Braided River 1990, Music: Louis Stewart
- Marie's Diary 1986, Music: Olivier Messiaen
- I Knew A Woman 1986, Music: William Bolcom
- Harmonium 1985, Music: John Adams
- Prometheus Bound 1984, Film Version of Greek Legend
- Perfides 1983, Music: Roberto Gerhard
- Portal 1979, Music: Charles Ives
- Old Man Drag 1975, Music: Jelly Roll Morton
- Song of Joys 1974, Music: Aaron Copland

== Jeanne Ruddy Dance Company ==
In August 1998, Jeanne Ruddy received a grant from the Pew Charitable Trust Foundation for a project called Dans Project 4 Philadelphia (later renamed Jeanne Ruddy Dance). The dance company was formally founded in 1999 as a company of highly trained professional dancers providing audiences in Philadelphia world-class performances

In April 2006 the Jeanne Ruddy Dance company presented two world premiere dances to inaugurate the opening of the Performance Garage. The performance was lauded by the Philadelphia Inquirer, noting that "This is a company of gorgeous, talented, pedigreed dancers that probably not enough Philadelphians know about." In 2012 Ruddy made the decision to close the dance company and focus her attention on the continued development of the Performance Garage.

== The Performance Garage ==
The building for the Performance Garage, in Philadelphia, was purchased in 2000, and after renovations it opened in 2003 as a space for dance classes, rehearsals, workshops, and performances. It is a space for choreographers and dance companies to practice and perform. It continues to operate as an incubator for new dance.

== Fellowships/Awards/Grants ==
- Independence Foundation Fellowship – 2000 (creation of Jeanne Ruddy solo, Significant Soil)
- Pew Foundation Dance Advance Grant – 2000–2001 (for Mark Dendy with Jeanne Ruddy Dance guest choreographer)
- Pennsylvania Department Of Community And Economic Development – 2001, 2006, 2008
- The William B. Dietrich Foundation – 2001 (Façade renovation of Performance Garage)
- Samuel S. Fels Foundation – 2004, 2007, 2009 (Various)
- Independence Foundation – 3 Year Support Award 2003 – 2005 (Operating)
- National Endowment for the Arts – Challenge America Award- 2004 (Capital Campaign – Performance Garage)
- Pennsylvania Performing Arts on Tour – Pennpat – 2004 – 2009 (Jeanne Ruddy Dance Touring program)
- William Penn Foundation – 3 Year Support Award 2005–2007 (Various)
- Pennsylvania Performing Arts Program Stream Award – 2006 – present (Operating)
- Greater Philadelphia Cultural Alliance 5-County Arts Fund – 2006 (Operating)
- Pew Foundation Dance Advance Grant – 2007–2008 (for Susanne Linke, Jeanne Ruddy Dance guest choreographer)
- Philadelphia Cultural Management Initiative – 2007–2008 (Operating)
- Pew Foundation Dance Advance Grant – 2008–2009 (for Martha Clarke, Jeanne Ruddy Dance guest choreographer)
- William Penn Foundation – 1 Year Support Award 2008–2009 (Technology upgrades)
- Federal Stimulus Funds – 2008 (Operating)
- William Penn Foundation – 1 Year Support 2009–2010 (Three-Yr Strategic Plan)
- Marthe LaVallee-Williams Community Outreach Endowed Fund – October 2008
- Dance/Usa Philadelphia
- Dolfinger-McMahon Fund
- Pennsylvania Council of the Arts
- Cultural Corridors Fund – 2017 (Capital Campaign)

== See also ==
- List of choreographers
