= Athina Vahla =

Athina Vahla is a London-based independent artist and teacher. Originally from Greece, having won the Greek National Choreographic Award, she took up residence in London. Athina was awarded two scholarships to further her dance studies at the Laban School where she received the Bonnie Bird Choreography Award in 1994, before undertaking a master's in art in interdisciplinary arts at Middlesex University. In summer 2022, Vahla was awarded a PhD through Public Works by Middlesex University, London, UK.

== Career ==
Athina has worked extensively as a choreographer, animateur and teacher; she has produced a steady stream of critically acclaimed works. Athina has concentrated on large-scale, site-specific work that creates evocative environments for performers and audiences to inhabit and explore. She is particularly interested in the historical elements of the site and how traces of the past inform the making of new work. Underpinning her process is a concern with humanism and contemporary society.

== Works ==
2008–2012: Arenas
A body of work to be developed over the next five years focusing on the concept of the arena as a playground to investigate the idea of sport-theatre and physical and mental exertion and the threshold of pain.

2008–2010: The Splinter in the Flesh
Originally commissioned as a work in progress by the British Council, Greece and Isadora Duncan Institute, The Splinter in the Flesh was further developed by the Hellenic Dance Company at the State School of Dance, Athens in Summer 2008 and was premiered at the Athens Music Hall in December 2010. The full-length work was the final stage of a three-year project based on the idea of identity and otherness.

2011: Strand
A site-specific commission for Infecting the City Festival that takes place at the new train station, Forecourt Square, in the City Hub, Cape Town. Strand focuses on the cultural and architectural heritage of the square and its historical connection to the sea as a port.
