= Stefan Sittig =

Director/Choreographer

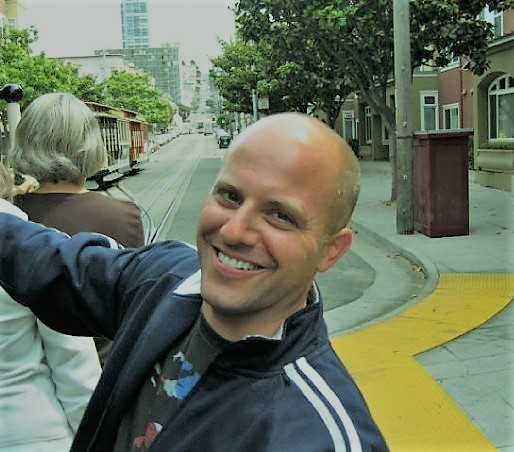
Stefan Sittig

Stefan Sittig is an American theatre director, choreographer, author, educator, performer, fight director, and movement and intimacy professional. Born in Washington, D.C., and raised in Rio de Janeiro, Brazil, he has worked in theatre in the United States and internationally, with much of his career based in the Washington metropolitan area.

== Biography ==
Although born in the U.S., Sittig's mother is Uruguayan and he was raised in Rio de Janeiro, Brazil.

In New York, Sittig created choreography for the rock musical, Jessie at The Chelsea Playhouse and Who Is Earth Mae? at Theatre Row - 42nd Street.

In the DC area he has choreographed In The Heights for which he received a Helen Hayes Award nomination for Outstanding Choreography in a Musical, Footloose and Nunsense A-men! and created fights and coordinated intimacy for The Shawshank Redemption at NextStop Theatre Company, created choreography and fights for Evil Dead: The Musical, Clyde's, Dracula: A Comedy of Terrors, The Drowsy Chaperone, Urinetown, Xanadu and The Mystery of Edwin Drood at Workhouse Arts Center, Man of La Mancha for The Washington Savoyards, Polaroid Stories for Studio Theatre, Jesus Christ Superstar for Open Circle Theatre, Dorothy Meets Alice and Winnie The Pooh for Adventure Theatre, Flora The Red Menace for 1st Stage, Hollywood Pinafore for The American Century Theater and the East Coast Premiere of Monarch: A Mexican-American Musical, Disney's Aladdin, Snapshots: A Scrapbook Musical, Little Women and Working for Creative Cauldron among many others.

Stefan is an Artistic Associate at MetroStage where he has directed/choreographed several productions including Volver/Return (which he also devised and co-wrote), Poetry & Tango (featuring poetry by Pablo Neruda and music by Quintango), Jason Odell Williams’ fast-paced dramedy Church & State, Terrence McNally's Mothers & Sons and Frankie and Johnny (Broadway World Award for Best Director and Best Play) and Sheridan Morley's musical Noel & Gertie.

Other directing credits include Trabajadores (the World Premiere of the Spanish version of Stephen Schwartz's Working), Cole Porter's Anything Goes and Red Hot & Cole, Jerry Herman's Jerry’s Girls, the 60's revue Beehive and Ken Ludwig's adaptation of Agatha Christie's Murder on the Orient Express.

He directed and choreographed Douglas Carter Beane's Xanadu for Workhouse Arts Center receiving a Helen Hayes Award nomination and 12 Broadway World Award nominations including for Best Director and Best Choreographer.

Stefan will be directing the Pulitzer Prize finalist play The Elaborate Entrance of Chad Deity by Kristoffer Diaz for NextStop Theatre (in collaboration with Flying V) in November 2026.

As a performer, he has appeared at The Kennedy Center, Signature Theatre, Studio Theatre, Olney Theatre Center, The Barksdale Theatre, Theatre IV, Theatre Virginia, The Actor's Theatre of Washington and Heritage Repertory Theatre. In more than 25 years in the theatre, he has appeared onstage or worked with Angela Lansbury, George Hearn, Tina Fey, Savion Glover, Christina Hendricks, Marvin Hamlisch, Jason George, Zachary Knighton, Baayork Lee, Florence Lacey, Natascia Diaz, Judy McLane, Betty Ann Grove and Helen Carey.

He produces and hosts the podcast American Theatre Artists Online, where he interviews leading contemporary figures in American Theatre including several Tony Award, Golden Globe Award and Emmy Award winners and nominees.

His book, Latinidad in Musical Theatre was published by Bloomsbury/Methuen Drama in 2026. He is under contract to write a second book, this time about Tony Award winning Argentine director/choreographer Graciela Daniele, as part of the A Critical Companion series for Bloomsbury/Methuen Drama.

Stefan has also written a play, Jack and Leo, a new comedy about fathers, sons, and second chances.

Stefan writes a weekly column for Substack called A Life in the Theatre that includes academic writings, philosophies, opinions, and musings about his life in the theatre, covering a wide range of topics, including his experiences as a director, choreographer, fight director and working in professional theatre for the past 30 years and his childhood and adolescence growing up in South America.

Sittig holds a BA from the University of Virginia, and an MFA in Theatre from Virginia Commonwealth University.
