= Kraków Dance Theatre =

Polish Theatre

The Kraków Dance Theatre (Krakowski Teatr Tańca) is a dance theatre that evolved in 2008 from the GRUPAboso Dance Theatre (founded in 1996) and works under the artistic direction of Eryk Makohon in Kraków, Poland.

In 2008 the Krakowski Teatr Tańca GRUPAboso Association was established, whose aim is to support the artistic and educational activities of the Theatre. In 2010 the METAphysical Laboratory was established as the source of new dancers. The students-dancers of the Laboratory have become the guest dancers of the Theatre and they have an opportunity to create their own choreographies with a professional support.

Some of the company's awards were won at: the Tychy Theatre Meetings (2007, 2009), the Polish Contemporary Dance Confrontation in Konin (2009), the Polish edition of the Solo & Duo Dance Festival (2009 and 2010). Additionally, the company represented Poland at the 13th Biennial of Young Artists from Europe and the Mediterranean, which took place in May 2008 in Bari (Italy).

== Performances ==
=== As the GRUPAboso Dance Theatre ===
- 1996 10 Years of Fantasy
- 1997 Hormones
- 1998 Czajap
- 1999 The Absurd Azimuth
- 1999 I am a Human Being
- 1999 Golden Calf
- 2000 Tango
- 2001 Panaceum
- 2001 Rowan, rowan
- 2002 Columbus
- 2002 Confessions controlled
- 2002 0-700 ...
- 2003 A conventional portrait
- 2003 Metaphysical Duets
- 2004 I am a Human Being
- 2005 The Coroner
- 2006 The Woman in the Dunes
- 2006 Cicindela
- 2007 Existences

=== As the Kraków Dance Theatre ===
- 2008 A Ballad of the Silence
- 2009 The Seventh Wife of the Eighth
- 2010 Do you feel like coffee? (choreographed by Agata Syrek)
- 2010 ... and I take you... until (choreographed by Paweł Łyskawa, Agata Syrek)
- 2010 Hungers (choreographed by Paweł Łyskawa)
- 2010 The Smoke
- 2010 Anacoluthon
- 2010 TAKARAZUKA camp
- 2012 Quadriga for THREE
- 2012 Blonde. A try.

== See also ==
- Dance in Poland
