= Pedro Romeiras =

Portuguese ballet dancer

Pedro Romeiras (born 3 July 1961 in Lisbon) started his career as a soloist with the National Ballet of Portugal after finishing ballet studies at the Royal Ballet School. He is a gold medal winner of the II Prix Français de la Danse 1982 and won a National Globe Award as best dancer of 1982. Romeiras has danced many glamorous principal roles of classical repertoire ballets such as Siegfried in the full length version of Swan Lake, Basilio in Don Quixote, Jean de Brienne in Raymonda, Romeo in Romeo and Juliet, The Poet in Les Sylphides, and many others. Romeiras has worked and been a guest at the Dutch National Ballet and Ballet D'el Teatro Municipal as a dancer, ballet master, and choreographer.
