= Parral, Chihuahua =

City in the Mexican state of Chihuahua

- City
- Hidalgo del Parral
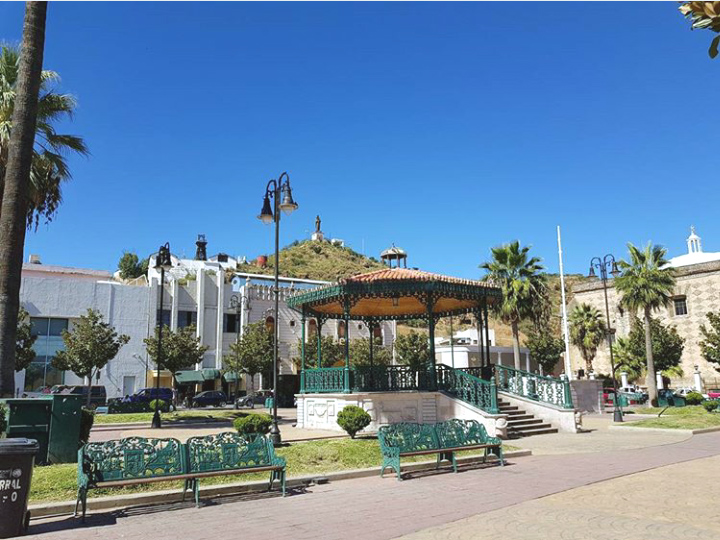
- The Plaza Guillermo Baca in downtown Parral.

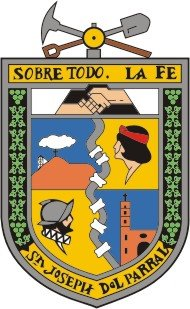
- Coat of arms

- Location in Mexico Parral, Chihuahua (Mexico)
- Coordinates: 26°56′N 105°40′W
- Country: Mexico
- State: Chihuahua
- Municipality: Hidalgo del Parral
- Founded: July 14 of 1631

Government
  - Mayor: Salvador Peña Aguirre
- Elevation: 1,620 m (5,310 ft)

Population (2015)
  - City: 109,510
  - Metro: 129,688
- Time zone: UTC-6 (CST)
- Postal Code: 31104
- Area code: 627
- Climate: BSk
- Website: hidalgodelparral.gob.mx

Hidalgo del Parral is a city and seat of the municipality of Hidalgo del Parral in the Mexican state of Chihuahua. It is located in the southern part of the state, 220 kilometres (140 mi) from the state capital, the city of Chihuahua, Chihuahua. As of 2015, the city of Hidalgo del Parral had a population of 109,510 inhabitants, while the metro area had a population of 129,688 inhabitants. During the colonial period the city was a significant supplier of silver to the Spanish empire and was known as San José del Parral. The name of the city was changed after independence from Spain, in honour of Fr Miguel Hidalgo, widely considered the 'Father of the Country'. In 2023, Hidalgo del Parral was designated a Pueblo Mágico by the Mexican government, recognizing its cultural and historical importance.

== Geology ==
Hidalgo del Parral mushroomed from the base of a hill of silver known as the Cerro la Prieta. The hill, is a part of the eastern foothill belt of the Sierra Madre Occidental, characterized by thick eroded deposits of tertiary volcanics. The bed rocks of both sedimentary and volcanic origin supply both lead and lead-free silver vein bearing ores.

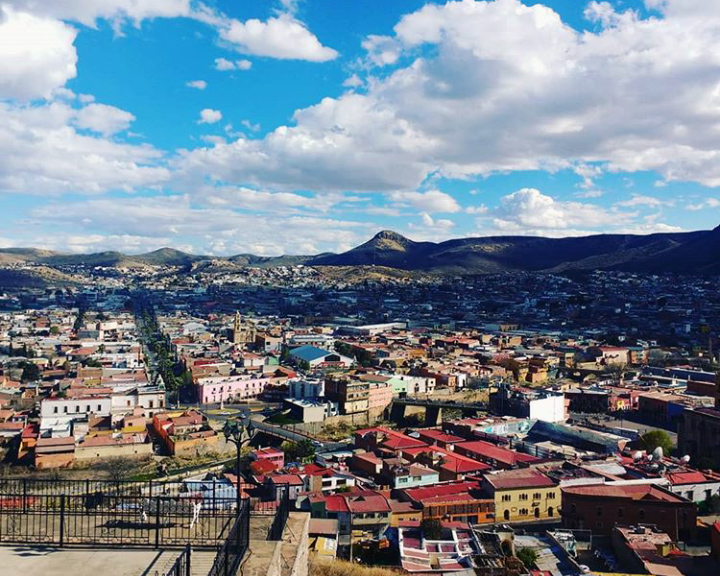
Parral from above

Parral's topography is characterized by both the silver vein bearing ores of its hill and adjacent basins that allowed for: the growth of crops such as maize, cattle grazing, and easy routes of communication to the state capital.

== History ==
During the sixteenth and seventeenth centuries, Parral was once a bustling center for silver mining.

According to legend, Juan Rangel de Biezma came here in 1629, picked up a rock on the "Cerro la Prieta" (La Prieta Hill), licked it and proclaimed, "There is a mineral deposit here." This deposit produced silver for 340 years.

Despite legend, as early as 1567, the silver mines at Santa Barbara were established in the territory of the Conchos people. However, in 1631, a vast new silver strike was made in what is now southern Chihuahua. Later, in 1640, it was declared "Capital of the World of Silver" by monarch Philip IV of Spain, at the very height of the Spanish Empire, that included territories in Eastern Asia, Italy, and the Low Countries.

=== Colonial Era ===
==== Urban design and economy ====
Parral's urban design during the colonial period did not mirror the stereotypical checkboard grid layout. Instead, the city developed with housing situated as close to the mine and hill as possible. Over time these temporary quarters evolved to more permanent, jacales, adobe structures surrounded by corrals plots of vegetables.

The development of Parral's association with its grain farms and stock ranches was based on the region's major physical characteristics and the necessity for agriculture to sustain the region's growing population. Under colonial authority the region was developed as a permanent mine-ranch settlement complex, requiring large amounts of food and labor.

Despite the fact Parral was not the most lucrative of the northern Mexican colonial mines, by 1640 Parral's population was 8,500, making the town the largest north of the tropic of cancer in the Americas, and nowhere else in the Americas during the colonial period was there a larger concentration of enslaved African people living in a single place.

==== Mining and labor ====
Labor within the mines was challenging, physically brutal, and frequently exploitative. The principal shaft of the mine at Cerro Prieta was 420 feet deep. In order to access the metals lodged beneath the ground, workers, dug with picks, wedges, metal points, and crowbars. Tools weighed at times up to forty pounds, and miners were working for twelve hours or more a day. Alongside grueling physical labor, miners were also at risk for danger on the job. Diggers regularly fell into shafts, were crushed by collapsing sections of the mine, and breathed in large amounts of silica causing scar tissue and lung decay. The inhalation of silica in the mines would build up in miner's lungs over years gradually causing severe lung scarring, low oxygen levels, and eventually death.

After metals were retrieved beneath the surface, miners, frequently enslaved Indigenous and African men utilized leather bags to bring metals to the surface. Derived from the Nahuatl word, tenatl, a fiber or leather bag, ore carriers were generally referred to as tenateros. Carrying 225–300-pound bags of metallic rock from the shafts to the surface, enslaved miners crawled through low passages and ascended by way of pine logs and ladders, before being unloaded into carts for transport.

A member of the Reales de Minas in Northern Mexico, the mines in Parral had a distinctive militaristic political and social structure. Labor for the mines of Parral was initially hard to obtain as the Chichimec people were not sedentary and were able to resist Spanish forced labor in the repartimiento system. Thus, systems of free labor emerged in the mines of Hidalgo del Parral that attracted large numbers of Aztec and Tarascan workers from the Southern mining company, Axace and Xixime workers from Sinaloa, Opata from Sonora and some Huichol and Tepehuan workers from Durango. Connecting networks of migratory native mine workers and suppliers across the region, the economic sphere of Parral extended far beyond the colonial center's geographic boundaries.

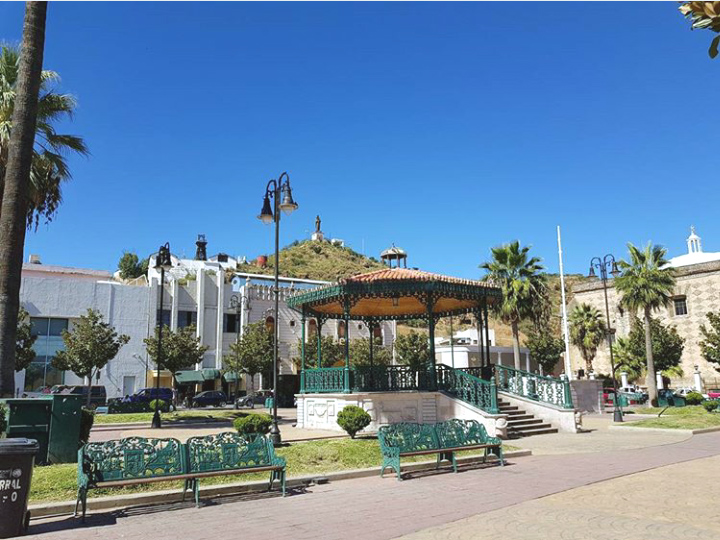
Centro en Hidalgo del Parral

After extraction, metals were transported from the mine to dozens of estates, known as haciendas, across the region for processing. Utilizing the smelting method to crush the ore into coarse gravel and combine it with molten lead, workers separated silver from rock. A few haciendas in Parral did not use the smelting process, and instead utilized patio amalgamation.

=== Independence ===
The large area of southern Chihuahua inhabited by the Rarámuri people included the highway between the mining districts of Parral, Cusihuiriachic, and Chihuahua. Asarco managed the La Prieta mine until the boom ended in the early 1930s; the minerals that were extracted were sent to the United States for final processing and then shipped back to Mexico, the US and other markets. After the end of the silver mining boom, Parral was almost completely abandoned in the early 1930s.

Currently, Parral is a medium-sized town in the state of Chihuahua mainly dedicated to commerce and is an important regional center for trade between the southern regions of Chihuahua and northern Durango. It received its first local television station in 1969, the now-defunct XHJMA-TV channel 3, and it currently has one local station, XHMH-TV channel 13.

Parral is often associated with several historical figures, including Mexican revolutionary leader Pancho Villa, who was assassinated in Parral on July 20, 1923, and initially buried here; and border ruffian "Dirty" Dave Rudabaugh, a sometime friend and foe of Billy the Kid.

Locals and visitors of Parral can visit the Palacio de Alvardo, a late nineteenth century house belonging to a mining baron, as well as, if accompanied by a guide, the mine itself. Its intricate network of streets and alleys are distinctive features of the city, helping to preserve its colonial style. Urban development has been slow due to the lack of potable water and its complex physical geography.

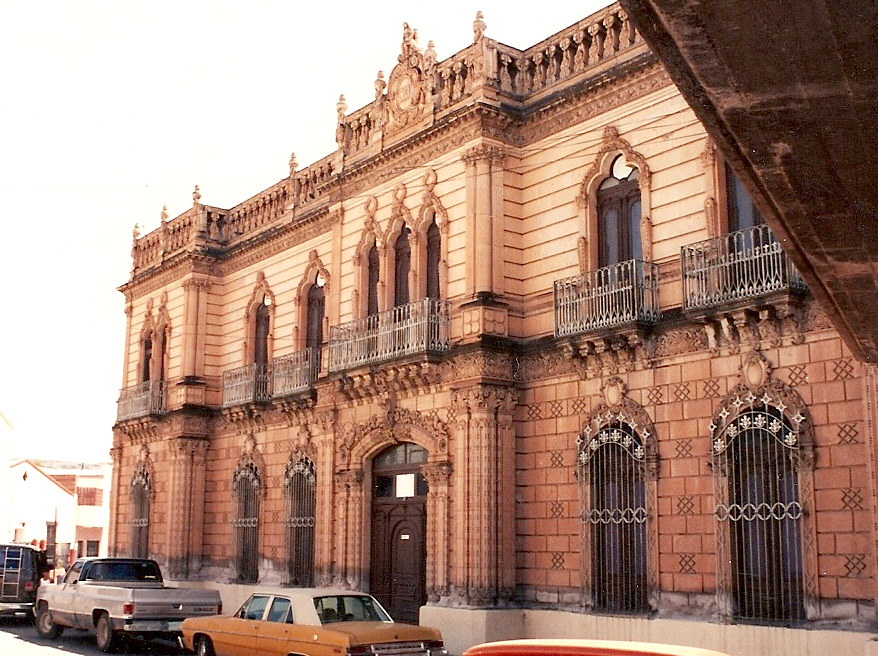
The Palacio Alvarado was once the home of one of the wealthiest mining barons in Parral.

== Notable sites ==
=== El Palacio de Alvarado ===
It belonged to one of the most prominent families in Parral, descendants of Pedro Alvarado owning the silver mine called "La Palmilla." This family was rich enough to offer the President Porfirio Díaz to pay the national external debt. The palace was constructed by Federico Amérigo Rouvier and it is now a museum and cultural center. It has preserved much of the original European-made furniture. The walls of the patio were painted by Italian painter Antonio Decanini between 1946 and 1948.

=== El Hotel Hidalgo ===
This historical building was a gift from Don Pedro Alvarado to Pancho Villa and is located next to the Plaza Guillermo Baca.

=== La Casa de la Familia Griensen (the Griensen Family House) ===
This is where Elisa Griensen was born. She distinguished herself in Parral history by fighting against a contingent of U.S. soldiers sent to capture Pancho Villa after he crossed the border and attacked Columbus, New Mexico.

=== The Francisco Villa Museum ===
The Francisco Villa Museum is a historical building located on the street near the spot where Villa's enemies waited days for him to pass and ultimately assassinated him in 1923. Every year in July, his death is reenacted here.

=== Casa Stallforth ===
Casa Stallforth is a palace built in a baroque style, featuring figures from Nordic mythology, that once belonged to the Stallforth family—who along with the Alvarado family, became the town's main benefactors, contributing much to its infrastructure.

== Notable events ==
The annual staging of the Murder of Francisco Villa, a recreation using props from the era, in the exact place of the historical event.

The annual Cabalgata Villista, is a long-distance horse ride with statewide massive participation and a spectacular visual event as thousands of horses enter the city (see Cavalcade).

== Food ==
In addition to its diverse and rich History, Parral is famous for its traditional foods. Parral was recently named as one of the "Ten Gastronomic Marvels of Mexico," primarily for its artisan confectioneries dulces de leche. These include a wide variety of candies and pastries from old recipes based on milk, sugar, and natural fruits. Some other notable recipes with a touch of Parral are enchiladas, barbacoa, steaks and cabrito (goat).

=== Dulces de leche ===
Dulces de leche are cooked-milk confections found nationwide in Mexico; Parral has been historically acclaimed since the 1930s because of the distinctive flavor of its dulces de leche—candies made with nuts like pecans, peanuts, hazelnuts, and fruits such as apricot, pineapple, coconut and others. Parral's candies have been shipped around the world; interesting destinations include Vatican City, Washington DC, and London.

These traditional confections arrived in Parral in the early 20th century. The origin of recipes is unknown, although it is believed that they arrived in southern Mexico from Europe during the colonial times. Then, these recipes were transferred to later generations.

One of the most famous confectionery artisans in Parral was Don Pablo Rodríguez, founder of La Gota de Miel. Don Pablito (as the Parralenses knew him) was born in Teocaltiche, Jalisco in the late 19th century. He and his wife arrived in Parral in the early 20th century, after working for several years in the State of Coahuila as a baker and a cook in the Hacienda del Rosario (now Parras de la Fuente) for Francisco Madero and Mercedes González (parents of President Francisco I. Madero). It is believed that their recipes might have acquired some influence from professional chefs also working in the hacienda at the time.

Several local artisans in Parral had recently—in the late 1990s—attempted to imitate Don Pablito's original recipe without success.

=== Enchiladas ===
Enchiladas are a specialty Mexican plate also found nationwide, and Parral is traditionally famous for its delicious enchiladas. They are a rolled maize tortilla stuffed with meat and covered with a tomato and chile sauce. Enchiladas can be filled with a variety of ingredients, including meat, cheese, beans, potatoes, vegetables, or seafood.

These other traditions in Parral started in the early 20th century and they gained notoriety in the mid-late 20th century. Enchiladas originated in Mexico. Anthropological evidence suggests that the indigenous people of the Valley of Mexico traditionally ate corn tortillas folded or rolled around small fish. Writing at the time of the Spanish conquistadors, Bernal Díaz del Castillo documented a feast enjoyed by Europeans hosted by Hernán Cortés in Coyoacán. In the 19th century, as Mexican cuisine was being memorialized, enchiladas were mentioned in the first Mexican cookbook, El cocinero mexicano (The Mexican Chef), published in 1831, and in Mariano Galván Rivera's Diccionario de Cocina, published in 1845.[4][8] Probably, as with the dulces de leche, these recipes arrived to Parral from immigrants from the south of Mexico.

Among the most famous cookers of enchiladas in Parral was Doña Cuca, near the historical Calicanto bridge.

=== Barbacoa ===
Barbacoa is meat from cattle or sheep slowly cooked over an open fire or, more traditionally, in a hole dug in the ground covered with maguey leaves; although the interpretation is loose, in the present day it may refers to meat (traditionally whole heads are used)steamed until tender.

During colonial and post-colonial times, Parral was famous because of its delectable barbacoa or birria de hoyo. Such barbacoa contained ingredients as laurel (bay leaf), garlic, maguey, onions, and other condiments. It was one of the luscious foods of the executives, foreigners, and miners working in the silver mines at Parral.

== Sports ==
Judo
Parral is known for its Judo clubs in Latin America: Judokan Parral. It is a Judo academy in an isolated part of Mexico. Among the recognized alumni of Judokan is Vanessa Zambotti, and Olympic judo-fighter with international experience, winner of a gold medal in the XIX Central American and Caribbean Games and silver medalist at the Judo World Cup in 2008. Judo in Parral is recognized at Panamerican level due to Judokan Parral.

Judo is increasingly becoming important for future generations who follow the sport closely in the North of Mexico. Judo in Parral is being recorded through oral testimonies and photographs to sketch this part of northern Mexico in popular history, including the impact of judo among practitioners.

Baseball
Parral is famous, primarily in the North of Mexico, for its baseball team Los Mineros de Parral.

== Government ==
As of January 2020, the city's mayor is Jorge Alfredo Lozoya Santillán, while the current city clerk is Francisco Adrián Sánchez Villegas.

== Notable people ==
- Gloria and Nellie Campobello, ballet dancers and choreographers. Born in Ocampo, Durango, spent their childhood in Parral.
- César Duarte, politician.
- Consuelo Duval, actress.
- Manuel Gómez Morín, politician, founding member of the National Action Party, born in Batopilas, Chihuahua, then moved to Parral.
- Juan Gómez-Quiñones, historian, professor of history, poet, and activist. Co-editor of the Plan de Santa Bárbara.
- Linda Helú Atta, Carlos Slim's mother.
- Humberto Mariles, show jumping champion in the 1948 Summer Olympics in London, where he won gold medals both in Individual Jumping and in Team Jumping.
- Carlos Montemayor, novelist, poet, essayist and literary critic.
- Adrián Mora, professional footballer, currently playing for Toluca.
- Antonio Ortiz Mena, politician and economist. Director of the Mexican Social Security Institute from 1952 to 1958, Secretary of Finance and Public Credit from 1958 to 1970, president of the Inter-American Development Bank from 1971 to 1988.
- José Fernando Ramírez, historian.
- Yair Rodríguez, mixed martial artist, former Interim UFC Featherweight Champion.
- Misael Rodríguez, bronze medal, boxing men's middleweight at the 2016 Summer Olympics
- Rafael Rangel Sostmann, rector of the Instituto Tecnologico y de Estudios Superiores de Monterrey.
- Aurora Reyes Flores, painter, first female exponent of Mexican muralism.
- Alfredo Ripstein, film producer.
- Jesús Gabriel Sandoval Chávez, professional boxer.
- Vanessa Zambotti, judoka, Gold medalist in the Pan American Games, Rio de Janeiro 2007.

== Geography ==
The city is located in the southern part of the state, 220 kilometres (140 mi) from the state capital, the city of Chihuahua, Chihuahua.

=== Climate ===
Parral has an altitude-moderated semi-arid climate (Köppen BSk) with rainfall limited to heavy thunderstorms during the hot summer months. During the dry season from October to May, days range from mild to hot and nights from chilly to mild. Frosts are common though not persistent in the winter.

Climate data for Hidalgo del Parral (1951-2010)
Month	Jan	Feb	Mar	Apr	May	Jun	Jul	Aug	Sep	Oct	Nov	Dec	Year
Record high °C (°F)	32.0 (89.6)	34.0 (93.2)	38.0 (100.4)	39.0 (102.2)	41.6 (106.9)	49.6 (121.3)	42.5 (108.5)	41.0 (105.8)	40.4 (104.7)	38.5 (101.3)	35.4 (95.7)	33.0 (91.4)	49.6 (121.3)
Mean daily maximum °C (°F)	18.4 (65.1)	20.6 (69.1)	24.2 (75.6)	27.7 (81.9)	31.1 (88.0)	32.9 (91.2)	30.5 (86.9)	29.2 (84.6)	27.8 (82.0)	25.9 (78.6)	22.5 (72.5)	19.2 (66.6)	25.8 (78.4)
Daily mean °C (°F)	9.9 (49.8)	11.9 (53.4)	15.2 (59.4)	18.8 (65.8)	22.4 (72.3)	24.9 (76.8)	23.5 (74.3)	22.4 (72.3)	20.9 (69.6)	17.8 (64.0)	13.8 (56.8)	10.7 (51.3)	17.7 (63.9)
Mean daily minimum °C (°F)	1.5 (34.7)	3.2 (37.8)	6.2 (43.2)	9.8 (49.6)	13.6 (56.5)	16.9 (62.4)	16.5 (61.7)	15.7 (60.3)	14.0 (57.2)	9.8 (49.6)	5.1 (41.2)	2.1 (35.8)	9.5 (49.1)
Record low °C (°F)	−15.0 (5.0)	−22.0 (−7.6)	−16.0 (3.2)	−3.2 (26.2)	2.0 (35.6)	1.4 (34.5)	4.0 (39.2)	3.6 (38.5)	2.0 (35.6)	−4.0 (24.8)	−8.0 (17.6)	−10.2 (13.6)	−22.0 (−7.6)
Average precipitation mm (inches)	7.8 (0.31)	5.6 (0.22)	2.0 (0.08)	8.2 (0.32)	15.6 (0.61)	56.7 (2.23)	120.5 (4.74)	117.3 (4.62)	106.9 (4.21)	24.9 (0.98)	8.4 (0.33)	5.6 (0.22)	479.5 (18.88)
Average precipitation days (≥ 0.1 mm)	1.7	1.4	0.6	1.4	2.8	7.0	12.8	13.0	9.4	3.8	1.8	1.7	57.4
Average snowy days	0.46	0.20	0.07	0	0	0	0	0	0	0	0.11	0.40	1.24
Average relative humidity (%)	57	54	50	46	44	53	63	65	67	61	61	61	57
Mean monthly sunshine hours	188	214	212	295	276	233	272	249	220	209	232	192	2,792
Source 1: Servicio Meteorológico Nacional
Source 2: Colegio de Postgraduados (snowy days)

== Sister cities ==
- Santa Fe, New Mexico, United States
- West Kanpur, India
