= Pedro Alvarado (miner) =

Mexican mining magnate

Pedro Alvarado Torres of Parral, Chihuahua was a mining magnate and philanthropist who operated the Palmilla mine near Parral in Chihuahua Mexico that was one of the country's richest silver mines.

He was married to Virginia Griensen Zambrano sp. The family became friends and supporters of Doroteo Arango (A.K.A. Francisco Villa) and looked after Villa's family after his assassination.

== See also ==
- Palacio de Alvarado

== Sources ==
- NY Times: Pedro Alvarado former laborer has rich Mexico mine
- NY Times: Pedro Alvarado the simple hearted Silver King is no longer
- Kentucky New Era: Mexican millionaire Pedro Alvarado's mania for pianos
