= Hilary Easton =

American choreographer (born 1960)

Hilary Easton (born 1960) is a contemporary dance choreographer, director, dancer and educator. A native New Yorker, she holds both a BFA and MFA from New York University Tisch School of the Arts. She founded Hilary Easton + Company in 1992, which has been presented at venues including American Dance Festival, Danspace Project and Dance Theater Workshop. She is on the faculty of The Juilliard School, where she teaches dance composition.

== Works ==
- Light and Shade
- The Reclamation, which opened the 2009 92Y-Harkness Dance Festival.
- Noise + Speed at The Danspace Project at St. Mark's Church
- It's All True, premiered at The Duke Theater
- The Short-Cut at The Danspace Project at St. Mark's Church
