= Malgorzata Nowacka =

Canadian choreographer and dancer

Malgorzata Nowacka (born 1974) is a Canadian contemporary choreographer and dancer.

== Life and career ==
Nowacka began her dance training at the School of Classical and Contemporary Dance directed by Bengt Jorgen in Toronto, Ontario.

Her first full-length choreographic work, Light Explorations of a Darker Nature was shown across Canada at the Canada Dance Festival and Dancing on the Edge. She is currently the Artistic Director of The Chimera Project, a Toronto-based contemporary dance company. She has been creating mainstage works for Ballet Jörgen Canada since 2000, which included Icarus and Seance.
