= Rajeev Khinchi =

Indian film choreographer

- Born: 29 November; Mumbai, Maharashtra, India
- Occupations: Film actor, director, producer
- Years active: 1996–present

Rajeev Khinchi is an Indian fashion and film choreographer. He is also a global business advisor for Whistling Woods, Asia's largest film school.

== Career ==
In 2016 he choreographed an event at Madison Square for Indian Prime Minister Narendra Modi. Khinchi also worked on movies such as Love Ke Chakkar Mein and Ye Stupid Pyar.

He was on the main choreography team for films such as Dostana, Veer, What's Your Raashee?, We Are Family, Aśoka, Kuch Kuch Hota Hai, Kaho Naa Pyaar Hai, Mohabbatein, and Kabhi Khushi Kabhie Gham. Khinchi was producing the Indo American movie Karmaanya in 2025.

Khinchi was a judge for Jhalak Dikhlaja Dance reality show in Dubai.

Khinchi directed international shows including Miss NYC, Miss Connecticut, Miss UAS and Miss Intercontinental .He choreographed fashion weeks around the globe.

He directed, choreographed and conceptualised several music videos and advertising films.

Khinchi choreographed sporting events such as IPL, CCL, BCL and hockey.

He is a member of RPI party of Ramdas Athawle, as All-India youth leader.

== Recognition ==
- Rashtriya Rajiv Gandhi Award for Best Choreographer (2015) Asian World Film Festival
