= Ana Mérida =

Mexican ballet dancer and choreographer

Ana María Mérida Gálvez (born Mexico City, 1922 – died 12 August 1991) was a Mexican ballet dancer and choreographer. She also appeared in several movies.

== Biography ==
In 1947 the director of El Instituto Nacional de Bellas Artes, Carlos Chávez, invited her to co-found (with Guillermina Bravo) La Academia de la Danza Mexicana. In 1948 she was named the full director of the Academy, continuing in that post through 1949. She taught at the drama school Escuela de Arte Teatral, led the national ballet (with whom she toured Central and South America), and was head of the department of dance of the Instituto Nacional de Bellas Artes. Mérida took the role of Francisca in the 1973 Mexican movie El Santo Oficio, winning a national award for her performance. She also authored and produced a ballet, Ausencia de flores, an homage to the Mexican muralist José Clemente Orozco.
