= Béatrice Kombe Gnapa =

Ivorian dancer

Béatrice Kombe Gnapa (April 6, 1972 – February 21, 2007) was a dancer and choreographer from the Ivory Coast. She was considered a leading figure in modern experimental dance in Africa.

== Biography ==
The daughter of a teacher of traditional dance, she was born in Touba. From an early age, she performed in traditional African dance groups. Gnapa formed the all-woman dance company TchéTché with dancer Jeety Lebri Bridgi in 1997. Her choreography was based on traditional dances which were given a contemporary interpretation. Her company TchéTché gave an award-winning performance at the Concours International de danse africaine in 1999. In the same year, the company performed at the Festival international de nouvelle danse in Montreal. Gnapa danced a duet with Nadja Beugré at the Rencontres chorégraphiques de l'Afrique et de l'océan indien in Paris in 2006. She had been a guest teacher in the theater and dance department at the University of Florida each year since 2002.

Her work was awarded the Prix découvertes RFI in 2000, the Prix Unesco at the Festival MASA in 1999 and a prize at the Rencontres chorégraphiques d'Afrique et de l'océan Indien in 2001. Her company appeared in the 2002 documentary African Dance : Sand, Drum and Shostakovich by Ken Glazebrook and Alla Kovgan. Gnapa appeared in Joan Frosch's 2006 documentary Movement (R)evolution Africa.

She died in Abidjan from kidney failure at the age of 34. Her company had just completed its second tour in the United States.
