= Marguerite Donlon =

Irish dancer, choreographer and ballet director

Marguerite Donlon (born 31 May 1966) is an Irish dancer, choreographer and ballet director.

== Career ==
Marguerite Donlon was born in County Longford, Ireland. After a childhood of traditional Irish dance, Marguerite began her ballet studies with Anica Louw and Dorothy Stevens at the late age of 13. She became a soloist and choreographer with the dance company of the Deutsche Oper Berlin in 1990; before that she was a member of the English National Ballet under Peter Schaufuss. During this time she worked with and was coached by many world-renowned artists, including Natalia Makarova, Rudolf Nureyev, Kenneth MacMillan, and danced pieces from choreographers such as Maurice Béjart, William Forsythe, Bill T. Jones, Meg Stuart and Jiří Kylián.

She was director of the ballet at the Saarländisches Staatstheater between 2001 and 2013.

== Awards ==
- 2007 Nomination for the Prix Benois (Giselle: Reloaded)
- 2007 Nomination for the German theatre prize Der Faust (Romeo und Julia)
- 2007 Award: Saarländischer Verdienstorden

== Selected works ==
- 1999: Patch of Grass. Deutsche Oper. Berlin, Germany.
- 2000: Different Directions. Independent Company. Berlin, Germany.
- 2001: We Three Sheep. Deutsche Oper. Berlin, Germany.
- 2002: BeBob. Nederlands Dans Theater 2, Nederlands
- 2002: How fast you want!. Staatliche Ballettschule. Berlin, Germany.
- 2002: Somewhere Between Remembering and Forgetting. Stuttgart Ballet, Germany.
- 2002: Move. Staatliche Ballettschule. Berlin, Germany.
- 2002: Taboo or not. Vienna State Ballet, Austria.
- 2003: Chocolate (bittersweet). Staatliche Ballettschule. Berlin, Germany.
- 2003: Carmen privat. Staatliche Ballettschule. Berlin, Germany.
- 2003: Poetic Licence. Staatliche Ballettschule. Berlin, Germany.
- 2004: Blind Date. Staatliche Ballettschule. Berlin, Germany.
- 2004: Zettels Sommernachts Traum. Staatliche Ballettschule. Berlin, Germany.
- 2005: Strokes Through The Tail. World Premiere Hubbard Street Dance Company. Chicago, USA
- 2005: Tanz mir das Lied vom Tod. Staatliche Ballettschule. Berlin, Germany.
- 2005: Die Schachtel. Théâtre National du Luxembourg and SST.
- 2005: Eros - Life Instinct. Staatliche Ballettschule. Berlin, Germany.
- 2005: Erinnerung an...eine Zukunft. Staatliche Ballettschule. Berlin, Germany.
- 2005: On Top. Staatliche Ballettschule. Berlin, Germany.
- 2006: CRASH. Staatliche Ballettschule. Berlin, Germany.
- 2006: Schatten. Staatliche Ballettschule. Berlin, Germany.
- 2006: Die rotten Schuhe. Staatliche Ballettschule. Berlin, Germany.
- 2006: Words and Music (And Silence). Théâtre National du Luxembourg.
- 2006: Giselle: Reloaded. Saarländisches Staatstheater Saarbrücken, Germany.
- 2007: Romeo und Julia. Saarländisches Staatstheater Saarbrücken, Germany.
- 2007: Seed. Saarländisches Staatstheater Saarbrücken, Germany.
- 2008: The Nutcracker. Saarländisches Staatstheater Saarbrücken, Germany.
- 2008: Splash!. Saarländisches Staatstheater Saarbrücken, Germany.
- 2008: Le sacre du printemps. Saarländisches Staatstheater Saarbrücken, Germany.
- 2009: Swan Lake– aufgetaucht. Saarländisches Staatstheater Saarbrücken, Germany.
- 2009: Casa Azul - Inspired by Frida Kahlo. World Premiere Saarländisches Staatstheater Saarbrücken, Germany.
- 2010: Footprints. Saarländisches Staatstheater Saarbrücken, Germany.
- 2010: Buster Keaton in Silent Mov(i)e. Saarländisches Staatstheater Saarbrücken, Germany.
- 2011: Secret of immortality (alpha, soma). Saarländisches Staatstheater Saarbrücken, Germany.
- 2011: BLUE. Piece about environmental sustainability. Saarländisches Staatstheater Saarbrücken, Germany.
- 2012: Heroes. World Premiere in Saarländisches Staatstheater Saarbrücken, Germany.
- 2012: Labyrinth of Love. Rambert Dance Company. London, England.
- 2013: LIEBE in schwarz-weiß. Saarländisches Staatstheater Saarbrücken, Germany.
- 2013: Close Up. Saarländisches Staatstheater Saarbrücken, Germany.
- 2013: Christus am Ölberg. Musikfestspiele Saar in Cooperation with SST and Donlon Dance Company Berlin.
- 2013: Wings. Saarländisches Staatstheater Saarbrücken, Germany.
- 2014: Shadow. Saarländisches Staatstheater Saarbrücken, Germany.
- 2015: Heroes-K, Body (Adaption). Opernhaus Kiel, Germany.
- 2015: Der Bettler von Paris. DDC Berlin. Theater an der Rott in Eggenfelden, Germany.
- 2015: Made in Love. Gärtner Platz, Munich.
- 2015: Transparent Cloud. Hessisches Staatsballett, Darmstadt, Germany.
- 2016: Ruff Celts. Visceral Dance Company. Chicago, USA.
- 2016: Amore. Strokes through the Tail - Svetlana Zakharova
- 2016: The One Grand Show. Friederichstadt Palast, Berlin, Germany.
- 2017: To the Moon and Back. MiR - Musiktheater Im Revier Gelsenkirchen, Germany.
- 2017: Heroes -H. Theater Hagen, Germany.
- 2018: The Last Life Boat Project. DDC Berlin:
- Solo, premiered in Craw Festival, Berlin. |
- Duet, premiered in Backstage Theatre. Longford, Ireland.
- Installation Performance, premiered in Yadegar Asisi's "TITANIC - Die Versprechen der Moderne" in Panometer Museum, Leipzig.|
- Last Life Boat World Premiere. BalletX in Philadelphia, USA.
- 2019: Le cage aux folles - Choreography. Theater Basel, Switzerland.
- 2019: Dare to see. Duet premiered at Le Grand Theatre du Luxembourg, Gala des étoiles.
- 2019: Lost in Translations. Step Up 19 Dance Limerick, Ireland.
- 2019: Strokes through the tails. DDC Berlin. Dance Salad Festival. Houston, USA.
- 2019: Casa Azul. Ballett Hagen. Germany.
- 2022: East West: Premiere, 3.04.2022 for Dance Company Osnabrueck, Germany
- 2022: Romeo & Juliet: Premiere, 5.11.2022 for Dance Company Osnabrueck, Germany
- 2023: Lorca: Premiere, 18.03.2023 for Dance Company Osnabrueck, Germany
- 2023: Das Floß der Medusa, 17.09.2023 for Komische Oper Berlin, Germany
- 2023: Ruff Celts: Premiere 20.10.2023 for Theater Münster, Germany
- 2023: Orlando: Premiere, 23.10.2023 for Graz Oper Ballet, Austria
- 2024: Dán: Premiere 29 Sug 2024, for Donlon Dance Collective, Forum kreuzberg, Berlin
- 2024: To The Moon and Back: Premiere 06.12.2024 for Poznan Opera Ballet, Poland
- 2025: Big Wig: for BalletX, Philadelphia, USA

== General references ==
- "DNB, Katalog der Deutschen Nationalbibliothek" (in German). Portal.d-nb.de. Archived from the original on 1 February 2016.
- "Claas Willeke: Claas Willeke & Marguerite Donlon". Claaswilleke.de. Archived from the original on 18 July 2011.
