= Tom Pazik =

Tom Pazik (1940–1993) began his dance training in Detroit, Michigan where he studied under Sandra Severo. He continued his training with Leon Danelian, Yurek Lazowski, Michael Maule, Richard Thomas, and Vera Volkova.

Pazik joined the Atlanta Ballet as a principal dancer in 1970. He later became the Atlanta Ballet's associate director and resident choreographer. In 1983, he was appointed artistic director for the Baltimore Ballet. In June 1985, Robert Barnett appointed Pazik to the position of director of the Atlanta School of Ballet and artistic director of the Atlanta Ballet II.

Since he began choreographing in 1974, Pazik created over eighty ballets, including four full length ballets, children's ballets and lecture demonstrations. In 1977, The Metropolitan Opera engaged Pazik to choreograph the ballet sequences for La Traviata and La Favorita for the Opera's 1977–1978 season. His works have been in the repertoire of the Atlanta Ballet, Augusta Ballet, Baltimore Ballet, Boston Ballet, Joffrey II, Washington Ballet, Giordano Dance Chicago, Dance Alive, Gainesville Ballet, Georgia Metropolitan Dance Theatre, Tampa Ballet, Gwinnett Ballet Theatre, Peninsula Ballet, Atlanta Dance Theatre, Ballet Hawaii, Augusta Dance Theatre, The Greenville Ballet, and The Philippine Ballet Theater.

Along with his choreographic credits, Pazik had extensive credits as a teacher and trained a number of dancers who are now enjoying successful professional careers. Other aspects of his career include a background in technical theatre and musical comedy as a performer, technician costume designer, choreographer, director and teacher.

In 1992, Pazik founded Capital City Ballet, a preprofessional company and an honor company with Regional Dance America SERBA until 1999. In October 1993, Pazik was honored by the Southeastern Regional Ballet Association with their lifetime achievement award.
