= Guillermina Bravo =

Mexican ballet dancer, choreographer and ballet director (1920–2013)

- Born: Guillermina Nicolasa Bravo Canales; November 13, 1920; Chacaltianguis, Veracruz, Mexico
- Died: November 6, 2013 (aged 92)
- Occupations: Ballet dancer, choreographer and ballet director

Guillermina Nicolasa Bravo Canales (November 13, 1920 – November 6, 2013) was a Mexican modern dancer, choreographer and artistic director of Ballet Nacional de Mexico. She was co-founder of the academy of Mexican dance (Spanish: Academia de la Danza Mexicana) in 1947 and established together with Josefina Lavalle the national ballet company in Mexico City in 1948, which has been located in Querétaro since 1991, where she also established the national center of contemporary dance. Bravo is considered as main figure of modern Mexican dance. Her sister Lola (1918–2004) was a notable stage actress.

== Biography ==
Guillermina Bravo, daughter of Guillermo Nicolás Bravo and María de los Dolores Canales y Mondragón, was born in Chacaltianguis, Veracruz. She studied folk dance at the national dance school (Spanish: Escuela Nacional de Danza) and music at the Conservatorio Nacional de Música. In 1938 she was taught by Estrella Morales, and taught choreography autodidactically from 1940 to 1945, while she danced as ballerina of Waldeen's ballet of fine arts (Spanish: Ballet de Bellas Artes) in Mexico City. Afterwards she was involved in the establishment of the Academia de la Danza Mexicana and the national ballet. After 1960, she retired from the stage but kept the direction of the national ballet.

In 1989, she received the José Limón National Dance Award.

Bravo is member of the Academia de Artes and of the World Dance Alliance. She was awarded with the 1979 Premio Nacional de Ciencias y Artes and was made honorary doctor of the Universidad Veracruzana.

== Literature ==
- César Delgado Martínez: Guillermina Bravo (Spanish), ISBN 968-29-4948-3
- Patricia Cardona: Guillermina Bravo iconografía (Spanish), ISBN 968-29-9039-4
- Alberto Dallal: La muerte en la obra de Guillermina Bravo (Spanisch), in Diálogos.-México, Vol. 17 (1981), pp. 23–28
