= Nellie Campobello =

Mexican ballet dancer

- Born: María Francisca Moya Luna; November 7, 1900; Villa Ocampo, Durango
- Died: July 9, 1986 (aged 85)
- Occupations: writer, dancer, choreographer
- Children: 1 son (1919–1921)
- Writing career
- Pen name: Nellie Francisca Ernestina Campobello Luna
- Genres: novels, poetry
- Notable work: Cartucho

Nellie (or Nelly) Francisca Ernestina Campobello Luna (November 7, 1900 – July 9, 1986) was a Mexican writer, notable for having written one of the few chronicles of the Mexican Revolution from a woman's perspective: Cartucho, which chronicles her experience as a young girl in Northern Mexico at the height of the struggle between forces loyal to Pancho Villa and those who followed Venustiano Carranza. She moved to Mexico City in 1923, where she spent the rest of her life and associated with many of the most famous Mexican intellectuals and artists of the epoch. Like her half-sister Gloria, a well-known ballet dancer, she was also known as a dancer and choreographer. She was the director of the Mexican National School of Dance.

== Biography ==
Campobello was born María Francisca Moya Luna in Villa Ocampo, Durango, to Jesús Felipe Moya Luna and Rafaela Luna. She was born in 1900, though she would later sometimes say that she was born in 1909, 1912, or 1913. She spent her childhood in Parral, Chihuahua, and her youth in the city of Chihuahua, where she attended the Inglesa de la Colonia Rosales college. After her father was killed in the Battle of Ojinaga in 1914, her mother remarried the physician Stephen Campbell from Boston, whose last name the children assumed, and which Nellie altered to Campobello. In 1921, her mother died.

In 1923, after the Mexican Revolution, she came to Mexico City, where she and her younger sister Gloria (baptized as Soledad Campobello Luna) studied dance. Under the direction of Nellie, Gloria was considered the Prima Ballerina of Mexico. She was later (from 1937) director of the national school of dance at the Instituto Nacional de Bellas Artes. In 1942, along with Gloria, as well as the writer Martín Luis Guzmán and the painter José Clemente Orozco, she founded the Mexico City Ballet.

== Choreography and dance ==
In 1923, she started her career as a ballerina, together with her sister Gloria, in Mexico City. She was a classmate of the Costa sisters (Adela, Amelia, and Linda), Lettie Carroll, Carmen Galé, Madame Sanislava Potapovich, and Carol Adamchevsky.

To commemorate the start of the Mexican Revolution, the Mexican government commissioned a choreographed dance that would represent the armed movement and its previous successes (public education, peace, etc.). In November 1931, Campobello presented the Ballet de masas 30-30 (Ballet of the Masses 30-30) in the Estadio Nacional de México. This included student performers from the Escuela Plástica Dinámica (today known as the Escuela Nacional de Danza Nellie y Gloria Campobello) and elementary school students (who symbolized the common people). Nellie, dressed in red, representing the Revolution. The Ballet de masas 30-30 would later go on to travel throughout the country as part of Las Misiones Culturales (Cultural Missions). It was also reprised for President Lázaro Cárdenas in 1935 at the Estadio Nacional de México to commemorate the Día del Soldado (Veterans' Day).

In 1937 Campobello was designated the director of the Escuela Nacional de Danza (National School of Dance), a role which she occupied until 1984. Several famous Mexican dancers and choreographists have egressed of the school as Amalia Hernández.

Together with Martín Luis Guzmán and José Clemente, she founded the Mexico City Ballet, which she presented in the Palacio de Bellas Artes (Palace of Fine Arts) in collaboration with artists such as Carlos Chávez, Julio Castellanos, Carlos Orozco Romero, and Romero Montenegro.

In addition to the Ballet de masas 30-30, her body of dance work includes La virgen de las fieras, Barricada, Clarín, Binigüendas de plata, and Tierra. Her folk choreographic work includes Cinco pasos de danza o danza ritual, Danza de los malinches, El coconito, Bailes istmeños, Ballet tarahumara, and Danza de los concheros. With the Mexico City Ballet, she choreographed Fuensanta, Obertura republicana, Ixtepec, El sombrero de tres picos, Vespertina, Umbral, Alameda 1900, Circo Orrín, La feria, and many others.

== Literary works ==
=== Yo, poems, 1928; second edition, 1929 ===
In 1928, Campobello published her first book of poetry under the name Francisca (her birth name). Entitled Yo, the book was edited by LIDAN, Gerardo Murillo's editorial. Yo is composed of five poems, considered by Doris Meyer (a North American literary critic) as “necessary precursors in the formation of the spirit of social critique”. Irene Matthews described them as “[...] verses whose rhythms are at once childish and dance-like. Much of the poetry “dances” rhythmically”. Alongside poetry Campobello wrote during her time in Havana as a ballerina, some of the poems from Yo were published in the Cuban magazine Revista de La Habana. This collection was titled “Ocho poemas de mujer” (Eight poems of womanhood). “Ocho poemas de mujer” was also published under her birth name. Some of these poems were translated into English by Langston Hughes in his anthology of Dudley Pitts.

=== Cartucho, 1931; second edition, 1940 ===
In 1931, she published her most well-known novel, Cartucho, relatos de la lucha en el norte de México, financed by Germán List Arzubide.

Campobello described her motivation to write Cartucho as one of “avenging an injury”. After the end of the armed movement, some revolutionaries were tried against the group in power, including Francisco Villa, a childhood hero of Campobello. She continued to write about this fight in her work Apuntes sobre la vida militar de Francisco Villa.

Cartucho was narrated in three sections: “Men of the North”, “The Executed”, and “Under Fire”. Each one is made up of short stories or episodes about characters of Parral and of Villa Ocampo, told from the point of view of Nellie as a young girl. This point of view is rare within the genre of the Mexican Revolution. It is replete with details of daily life. It is said to be a feminist version of the Revolution, because it is narrated within private spaces, from the house of the author and from the neighborhoods of the Segunda de Rayo street in Parral. The majority of these spaces include mentions of women and children. The novel describes the personalities of women during the Revolution, not under the stereotypes usually attributed to women such as sentimentality and irrationality, but as pragmatic and strong characters, sometimes vulnerable, but facing their reality and fighting. The novel also shows men in the Revolution under a different view: a Villa that cried, a soldier that played and joked with the children, and a soldier that lulled and sang Campobello's younger sister, Gloria, to sleep.

=== Other works ===
- Las manos de mamá, novel, 1937
- Apuntes sobre la vida militar de Francisco Villa, 1940
- Ritmos indígenas de México, 1940
- Tres poemas, 1957
- Mis libros, 1960 (illustrated by José Clemente Orozco)
- Obra reunida, 2008 (Fondo de Cultura Economica)

== Personal life ==
She never married, but had a number of affairs. In 1919 she had a son, José Raúl Moya, who died two years later. Allegedly, the father was Alfredo Chávez, later Governor of Chihuahua. Also Germán List Arzubide told that he fell in love with her.

She was one of the few women involved in the center of Mexico's intellectual groups and was also great friends with Federico García Lorca and Langston Hughes, who translated her poetry into English.

To this day, she is considered the only female Mexican writer to publish narrations (semi-autobiographical) about the Mexican Revolution of 1910–1920. This is why she is often referred to "La centaura del norte", the "Centaur of the North." Her novel Cartucho is considered a classic literary work of the Mexican Revolution, showing the Villistas in a favorable light at a time when most of the literature was criminalizing them. She is considered the first modern narrator in 20th century Mexico.

=== Mysterious death ===
In 1985 Campobello suddenly disappeared, along with her belongings, including paintings by Orozco and Diego Rivera. She had apparently been kidnapped by Claudio Fuentes Figueroa or Claudio Niño Cienfuentes and his spouse Maria Cristina Belmont. Fuentes and his wife helped to care for Campobello's home in downtown Mexico City. He had power of attorney over Campobello. In 1998, a Salt Lake City newspaper reported that a warrant was issued for the arrest of Claudio Fuentes, but he was not located. The article reports that Fuentes said that he was in contact with Campobello during the 12 years of her disappearance. He was also involved with some investigations into finding the lost writer but eventually he backed out of the search.

In 1998, the Human Rights Commission of the Federal District ruled that Nellie had died on July 9, 1986, and that she was buried in an unnamed grave in a cemetery in Progreso de Obregón, Hidalgo. The gravestone with her initials on it was found in 1998. In a nearby town, a death certificate for Campobello was found indicating that she died of heart failure. Fuentes has signed this certificate as a witness. Her corpse was transferred to Villa Ocampo, her hometown, in 1999, and she was honored with a monument. Fuentes and his wife used the power of attorney and Campobello's age to take advantage of her. They convinced her to sign her will to give money to them because Campobello did not have other heirs.

As the critic Tabea Linhard puts it, "the tragic end of Campobello's life seems to echo a story the author herself may have written." On November 7, 2017, Google celebrated her life by creating a homepage doodle of Campobello for her 117th birthday.
