= Gloria Campobello =

Mexican ballet dancer and choreographer

- Born: October 21, 1917; Parral, Chihuahua, Mexico
- Died: November 1, 1968 (aged 51); Mexico City, Mexico

Gloria (Soledad) Campobello Luna (October 21, 1917 – November 1, 1968) was a Mexican ballet dancer and choreographer. Her older half-sister Francisca was a well-known writer and dancer, known as Nellie Campobello.

== Biography ==
Campobello was born as one of six children of Rafaela Luna. Her name at birth was probably Soledad instead of Gloria, and probably her year of birth was 1911. Some sources mention, that Nellie and Gloria had the same father, but Nellie's father died in 1914. Also Germán List Arzubide, who fell in love with her sister Nellie, mentioned Gloria as her half-sister.

After the widowed mother Rafaela married the physician Stephen Campbell from Boston, her children assumed his last name, which was altered to Campobello by Nellie, who cared for her little sister after the death of their mother in 1921. Together with her sister Nellie, she moved to Mexico City, where she danced as primaballerina of the Mexico City ballet and taught at the Escuela Nacional de Danza, today also known as Escuela Nacional de Danza Nellie y Gloria Campobello. After 1943 she had an affair with José Clemente Orozco, who left his family in 1946, and moved with her to New York City, where Gloria abandoned him.

== Literature ==
- Felipe Segura: Gloria Campobello - la primera ballerina de México (Spanish), 1991, ISBN 968-29-3357-9
