= Ana Itelman =

- Born: 20 August 1927; Santiago, Chile
- Died: 16 September 1989 (aged 62); Buenos Aires, Argentina
- Occupations: dancer, choreographer
- Years active: 1940-1989
- Known for: modern dance

Ana Itelman (20 August 1927 – 16 September 1989) was a Chilean-born dancer and choreographer, who spent most of her career in Argentina and the United States. Serving as a professor at Bard College and then director of the school of dance, she toured internationally between 1957 and 1969. In 1970, she returned to Argentina and established a contemporary dance theater. She was honored with the Konex Award for choreography in 1989.

== Early life ==
Ana Itelman was born on 20 August 1927 in Santiago, Chile. When she was two years old, her family relocated to Argentina. She studied dance at the Conservatorio Nacional de Danza (National Conservatory of Dance) and Conservatorio Nacional de Música y Arte Escénico (National Conservatory of Music and Performing Arts), graduating in 1945.

== Career ==
In the early 1940s, Itelman joined Myriam Winslow's dance troupe, the first Argentine modern dance company. After five years, in 1945 she moved to the United States training with Martha Graham, Hanya Holm, Louis Horst, and José Limón to perfect her craft. Returning to Argentina in 1947, Itelman began choreographing and performing solo work, and created a modern dance studio in 1950 to develop her own company. She premiered in 1955 with a fusion style in "Esta ciudad de Buenos Aires" (This is the City of Buenos Aires), which combined tango dynamics with classical choreography.

Itelman returned to the United States in 1957 and began working as an associate professor of dance at Bard College and began choreographing and supervising performances for the college's dance students. In 1965, she was the head of the dance department at Bard. Simultaneously with her teaching, Itelman continued her own training with Merce Cunningham and Alwin Nikolais, among others, and studied lighting and makeup at the Dramatic Workshop run by Erwin Piscator.

She took lessons in performance with Lee Strasberg and attended painting classes at the Brooklyn Museum. In the summers, she returned to South America, performing in various theaters in Buenos Aires, as well as performing in Ecuador, Montevideo and in Brazil at the 400th anniversary of the founding of Rio de Janeiro, or toured in Europe. Itelman performed in England, France, Germany, Italy, the Netherlands, Spain and the USSR. She remained at Bard as the Director of the dance department until 1969, when she returned to Buenos Aires.

In 1970, Itelman founded the Café Estudio de Teatro Danza and began developing both creative and educational aspects of dance theater. She staged "Alicia en el país de las Maravillas" as her first production. Her studio is now the home of the Choreographic Workshop at the San Martín Theater. Between 1977 and her death, she created choreographies of works which have become iconic pieces for the Workshop, including: El capote (The cloak), Historia del soldado (History of the soldier), Las casas de Colomba (The houses of Colomba, inspired by Tennessee Williams's iconic play A Streetcar Named Desire), Paralelo al horizonte (Parallel to the horizon), Suite de percal (Suite of percale) and Y ella lo visitaba (And she visited it).

== Death and legacy ==
Itelman committed suicide on 16 September 1989 in Buenos Aires. That same year, she was honored with the Konex Award for choreography. On the tenth anniversary of her death, a tribute to her choreography was held at the Ana Itelman Salon on Guardia Vieja in Buenos Aires. Rubén Szuchmacher released Archivo Itelman in 2002, a biography of Itelman's career and artistic trajectory which chronicled her impact on modern dance in Argentina. In 2004, Mauricio Wainrot staged a retrospective of her works
