= Amy Seiwert =

American ballet choreographer

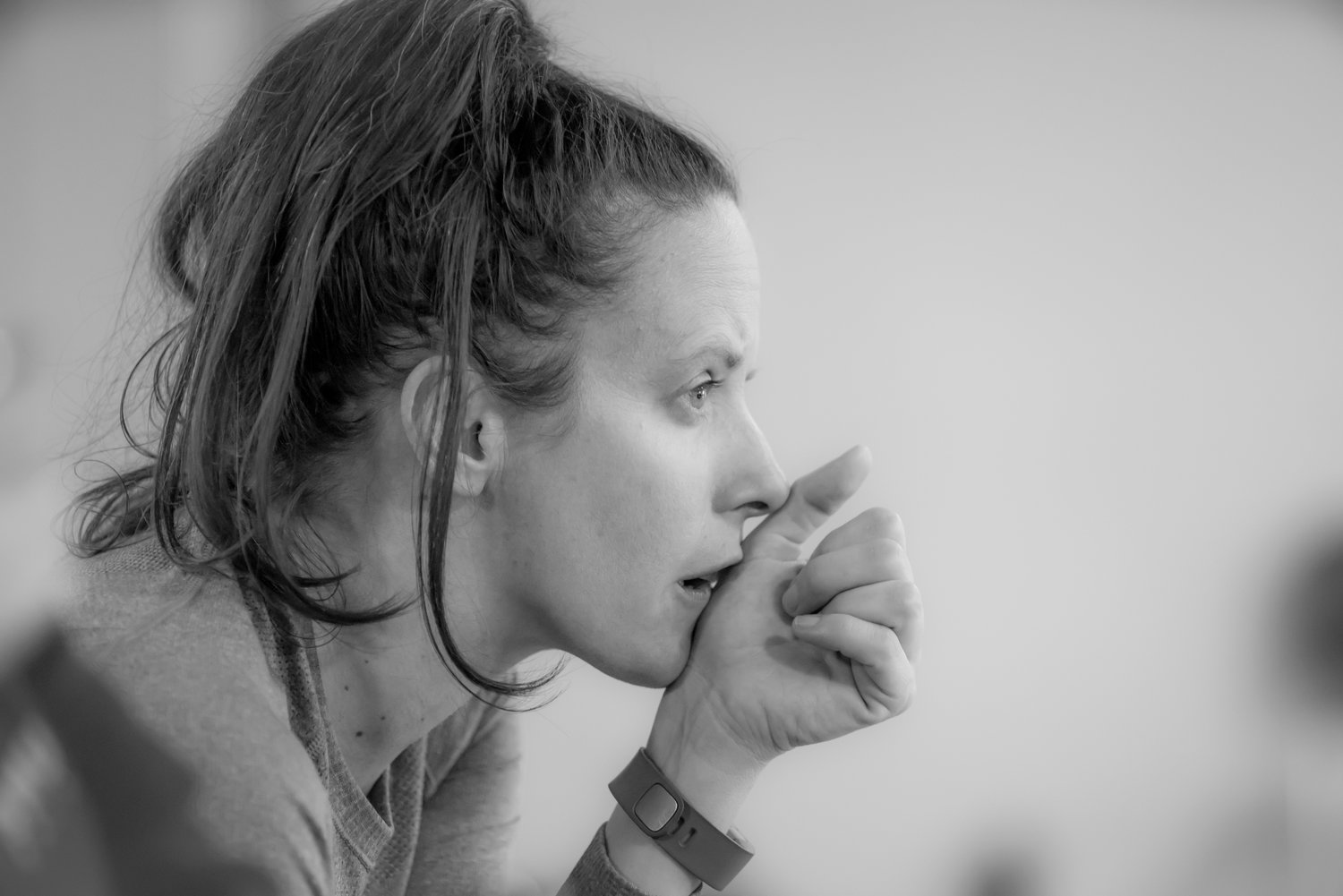
American contemporary ballet choreographer Amy Seiwert in rehearsal with Smuin Ballet. Photo by Keith Sutter.

Amy Seiwert is an American contemporary ballet choreographer and artistic director. She was the founder of Imagery, a contemporary ballet company in San Francisco, and currently directs Smuin Contemporary Ballet.

== Biography ==
Born in Cincinnati, Ohio, Amy Seiwert had a nineteen year performance career dancing with Smuin Ballet, Los Angeles Chamber Ballet and Sacramento Ballet.

During Seiwert's time dancing with Smuin Ballet, she became involved with the “Protégé Program” where her choreography was mentored by the late Michael Smuin. Seiwert was Smuin Ballet's "Choreographer in Residence" from 2008-2018.

From 2013-2015, Seiwert was Artist-in-residence at ODC Theater and in 2017 she was named the first National Artist-in-Residence with the Joyce Theater. Her work can be found in the repertories of Ballet Austin, BalletMet, Smuin Ballet, Washington Ballet, Atlanta Ballet, Oakland Ballet, Sacramento Ballet, Colorado Ballet, Louisville Ballet, Cincinnati Ballet, Carolina Ballet, Oklahoma City Ballet, Dayton Ballet, Milwaukee Ballet, American Repertory Ballet, and BalletX as well as AXIS Dance and Robert Moses' KIN.

Seiwert has collaborated with visual designers Marc Morozumi and Matthew Antaky, composers Daniel Bernard Roumain, Christen Lien, and Kevin Keller, media designer Frieder Weiss and spoken-word artist Marc Bamuthi Joseph.

From July 2018 to July 2020, Seiwert was artistic director of the Sacramento Ballet.

In April 2023, Seiwert was named Associate Artistic Director of Smuin Ballet and became Artistic Director for the company's 31st Season in Fall 2024, following the retirement of Celia Fushille. Seiwert's company Amy Seiwert's Imagery will close in Spring 2024.

== Choreographic style ==
Amy Seiwert is known for her willingness to take creative risks to innovate classical ballet choreography. Seiwert incorporates contemporary themes, narratives, music, and collaborators. Rita Felciano of the San Francisco Bay Guardian has said Seiwert, "...quite possibly is the Bay Area’s most original dance thinker, taking what some consider a dead language and using it as a 21st-century lingo to tell us something about who we are.”

== Awards and recognition ==
- 1999 Winner, Le Festival des Arts de Saint-Sauveur Choreography Competition
- 2000 Choreographer in Residence, Le Festival des Arts de Saint-Sauveur
- 2005 Dance Magazine: "25 to Watch"
- 2006, 2009 Invited to New York City Ballet's Choreographic Institute
- 2007, 2010, 2015, 2016, San Francisco Chronicle: "Top 10 Dance Events"
- 2010 San Francisco Bay Guardian: "Goldie"
- 2011 Nominee, Isadora Duncan Award for Outstanding Choreography for White Noise
- 2012 Nominee, Isadora Duncan Award for Outstanding Choreography for Requiem
- 2012 Nominee, Isadora Duncan Award for Outstanding Choreography for When It Frays
- 2014 Nominee, Isadora Duncan Award for Outstanding Choreography for Devil Ties My Tongue
- 2015 Second Place, McCallum Theater Choreography Festival
- 2015 Winner, Isadora Duncan Award for Outstanding Choreography for Back To
- 2020 Nominee, Isadora Duncan Award for Outstanding Choreography for Renaissance
- 2021 "Office Hours" Artist Residency at the Kennedy Center's The REACH
- 2023 Winner, Isadora Duncan Award for Outstanding Achievement in a Revival, Dear Miss Cline, Smuin Ballet

== Support ==
Amy Seiwert's work has been supported by the National Endowment for the Arts, San Francisco Grants for the Arts, Kenneth Rainin Foundation, California Arts Council, Fleishhacker Foundation, New Music USA, and the Zellerbach Family Foundation.
