= Teitur Lassen =

Faroese musician

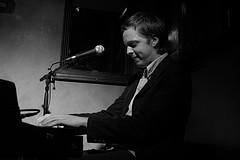

Background information
- Born: Teitur Lassen; 4 January 1977 (age 49)
- Origin: Faroe Islands
- Genres: Pop, folk, rock, orchestra, Chamber pop
- Occupations: Musician, composer, singer/songwriter, record producer
- Instruments: Vocals, guitar, piano, electronics, violin,
- Years active: 1997–present
- Labels: Universal, Nonesuch, Equator Records, Tutl, Cheap Lullaby, Arlo & Betty Records, V2, Edel, Playground Music, Stunt Records
- Website: teitur.com

Teitur Lassen (Faroese pronunciation: [ˈtaitʊɹ], 4 January 1977) is a Faroese musician, composer, singer-songwriter and producer. He is a winner of multiple Danish Music Awards and has toured globally since his debut release, Poetry & Aeroplanes, in 2003.

Teitur was born in Hoyvík. Since 2001 he has dedicated himself to playing and writing music in full-time, and has released seven studio albums as a solo artist. He has additionally produced, written for, or worked with multiple international artists including Seal, Corinne Bailey Rae, Netherlands Wind Ensemble, Emilie Simon, International Contemporary Ensemble (ICE), Holland Baroque Society, Nolwenn Leroy, Nico Muhly, and Ane Brun. His songs have appeared on major motion picture soundtracks and numerous compilations. Teitur was knighted by the Queen of Denmark Margrethe II in 2021.

== Studio albums ==
=== Poetry and Aeroplanes ===
After finding both a publishing deal with Windswept Pacific and a record contract with Universal Records in the United States, the Faroe Islands awarded him its 2004 "Businessman of the Year" award. His first major album, Poetry & Aeroplanes, released in 2003, was recorded in Los Angeles and Spain and featured a number of prominent studio musicians such as Pino Palladino, Matt Chamberlain and the production of Rupert Hine.

Within months of its debut, the record found a following among many of popular music's inner circle. Extensive touring in the US and Canada and rave reviews and industry/musician buzz led to opening slots on tours with Suzanne Vega, Glen Phillips, Rufus Wainwright, Aimee Mann, and John Mayer. John Mayer later described the album in his Esquire magazine article: "it may be one of the best albums to come around in the last five years...Music like this is jet fuel on the fire of a broken heart. Even if you think the flame has died, there's at least one lyric that'll hit that last hot spot, and then you'll find yourself as fucked as you were the day you lied and said you never wanted to see her again. Enjoy."

Teitur was featured on MTV's You Hear it First program. While not picked up by mainstream radio, several of the songs on Poetry & Aeroplanes found airplay on major television and motion picture soundtracks, most recently in the 2006 films Aquamarine and My Super Ex-Girlfriend. Teitur continued to tour extensively in over 20 countries, building a firm following and respect amongst media and the musician community, despite the lack of commercial marketing by Universal Records.

=== Stay Under the Stars ===
On 20 April 2006, Teitur's management issued a statement that he had dropped Universal as his record label following months of legal problems and creative differences, and from then on his records would be released on Arlo and Betty Recordings, a new label, run by his manager, and named after his two vintage Gibson guitars.

His second studio record Stay Under the Stars, produced by Martin Terefe (Jason Mraz, Ron Sexsmith, KT Tunstall, Train), was released in May 2006 in Scandinavia on Arlo and Betty, licensed to the indie label Playground Music. After spending several months in the Danish Top-40, the album was released in the U.S. and Canada on 5 September 2006 on the newly formed Equator Records, and on iTunes on 8 September 2006 and Edel Records in Germany, Austria and Switzerland.

The songs circle around the question asked in The Beatles' "Eleanor Rigby" lyric, "All the lonely people, where do they all come from?" and are written in first person about characters such as hitchhikers, burglars, night shift workers, star gazers and a carousel attendant. Also included is a re-arrangement of the Jerry Lee Lewis classic "Great Balls of Fire."

=== Káta Hornið ===
In 2007, Teitur released an album performed entirely in his native Faroese language under the title Káta Hornið. It was initially released in the Faroe Islands and Iceland, and Teitur toured throughout the Faroe Islands in its support. The album was recorded in a summer vacation house in Tisvildeleje, Denmark, in January 2007 and mixed in Santa Barbara, California, later in the year.

=== The Singer ===
In October 2007, Teitur started recording a new album, The Singer. The recording studio was set up in the barn of the famous house "Fridhem" on the island of Gotland, former home and dying place of world-renowned director Ingmar Bergman. The album was produced by Teitur and recorded and engineered by his long-time live sound engineer Jonas Bloch Danielsen, with arranger collaborator Tróndur Bogason. The album was released in Scandinavia on 11 February 2008, and a few months later in the rest of world. In 2009, he was awarded "Danish singer/songwriter Album of the Year" for The Singer at the Danish Music Awards 2009 and Albums of the Week in the UK's Guardian and Independent.

=== Let the Dog Drive Home ===
Teitur recorded his next album, Let the Dog Drive Home, in early 2010 in Copenhagen, with some of his regular musicians and collaborators, arranger Tróndur Bogason, drummer Derek Murphy (Atlanta, Georgia), bass player Mikael Blak (Faroe Islands), and Nikolaj Torp Larsen (London), and a host of guest musicians, and backing singers. Teitur once again produced the album, which was recorded and engineered by his regular cohort Jonas Bloch Danielsen and mixed by George Tandero (Norway) who also recorded and mixed Stay Under the Stars. The song title that spawned the album title is a metaphor for relaxing and letting things just happen. The artwork for the album, is based on a series of drawings by Teitur of a dog character, reflecting some of the lyrics in the album; the graphic design being handled, as on all his albums, by London-based Bob McKie with direction by Christian Ulf-Hansen.

The album was released in October 2010 in Scandinavia, reaching the top 10 in Denmark, preceded by the single "You Never Leave L.A." and in Germany, Austria, Switzerland, France, Benelux and Italy, also charting in the Netherlands; the single's animated video based on the dog character of the album artwork, directed by Alex Lee, took nearly six months to make. The first single in the UK and Ireland was the track "Betty Hedges", and the album was released on 11 April 2011 there, to great reviews, including "Album of the Week" in The Independent.

=== Story Music ===
In 2013, Teitur released his fifth studio album in English. The album written, produced and arranged by Teitur is the first one recorded on the Faroe Islands, and it features 78 local musicians from the age of 7 to 83. The recording took place in Studio Bloch, the first professional recording studio on the Faroes, built by long-time collaborator Jonas Bloch Danielsen, who also engineered and recorded the album. The style is described as world music, and it features many references to Faroese culture and traditions such as ring dance, folk music, monotony and nature. The song "It's Not Funny Anymore" was arranged for orchestra by Van Dyke Parks and recorded in the Eindhoven Concertgebouw by Reyn Ouwehand, performed by members of the Holland Baroque Society and additional musicians. The first single "Rock and Roll Band" was playlisted on 120 American radio stations. The album was awarded Artistic Achievement of the Year on the Faroe Islands. An interactive film about the album recordings is in production.

=== Confessions ===
Confessions is a collaboration with American composer Nico Muhly written for Holland Baroque Society - baroque instruments and voice. Originally four songs commissioned for a festival in 2009 in Muziekgebouw, Eindhoven in Netherlands. The songs were based on YouTube in its infancy and accompanied mundane and personal videos that people were posting on the site. The duo continued write a full concert programme and the album with 14 songs was released on Nonesuch in 2016 after being recorded in the end of a tour in the Netherlands. The music has been used in TV series The New Pope as well as in the ballet production by Smuin Contemporary Ballet - "Confessions" by Val Caniparoli premiered in 2019.

=== I Want To Be Kind ===
In 2018, Teitur released his album I Want To Be Kind, recorded and mixed in Reservoir Studios in New York, USA. The album was produced by well known musician/producer Thomas Bartlett (aka Doveman), with additional production by Teitur, and mixed by Patrick Dillett. Teitur sang all the vocals and Teitur and Thomas played most of the instruments on the album, with some additional bass clarinet by Doug Wieselman.

=== Cazador de Ostras ===
Released in September 2021, the Cazador de Ostras album, produced by Teitur was recorded in late 2019 in Mawi Road Studios in Buenos Aires, Argentina, with local guest musicians playing on the record with Teitur and Mariana Paraway features as guest vocalist with Teitur on the track "Broken Stars". The album was later edited in his studio in the Faroes in 2020 and then mixed by Dave Izumi Lynch at Echo Zoo in Eastbourne, UK. Half the album is in English and half in Faroese.

=== Songs from a Social Distance ===
In the middle of Covid pandemic Teitur was commissioned by Danish big band Aarhus Jazz Orchestra to write a song cycle. The lyrical material was put together from an email from writer Roy Freirich, after Roy failed to send his new book from Los Angeles to the Faroe Islands in the middle of pandemic anxiety and George Floyd protest in Los Angeles. The album was written for and recorded during lockdown in Aarhus Domkirke (Aarhus Cathedral) which has a very long and distinct reverb. Released in 2023 on Stunt Records, Denmark.

=== Kvæði ===
Released in 2024. The alternative jazz world music group Girls in Airports invited Teitur to be a guest vocalist for their residency in Vega. After this performance they decided to make a studio album. The material consists of kvæði and nursery rhymes called skjaldur, both reworkings of traditional material like Ólavur Riddararós and Flóvin Bænadiktson and newly written songs. The recordings were made in Teitur's studio in Faroe Islands and in Girls in Airports rehearsal space in Copenhagen. The album was mixed by Bruce Lampcov and also features the quartet singers KATA.

=== Yule ===
A collaboration between Teitur and Danish folk trio Dreamer's Circus resulted in the album Yule, released around Christmas in 2024. The material is traditional yule tunes and new songs, in Faroese, Danish and English including an 8 minute version of The Twelve Days of Christmas called Twelve Days with lyrics from a John Lewis shopping catalogue. It was recorded by Teitur in the Faroe Islands and mixed by Bruce Lampcov.

== Other works ==
In 2005, Teitur sang the track "Syner" on the 2005 "Andersen's Drømme" album, produced and compiled by Danish producer Nikolaj Nørlund. Norlund went on to produce Teitur's version of "Happy Xmas (War Is Over)" for the Danish Christmas album, Fra Danske Hjerter (translated as From Danish Hearts) in 2010.

In 2006 Grammy winner Corinne Bailey Rae released a song she co-wrote with Teitur "Choux Pastry Heart" on her debut album which sold 4 million copies worldwide and debuted at number one in the British charts.

Teitur produced and arranged the album "Le Cheshire Cat et Moi" in 2009 for French superstar Nolwenn Leroy, in addition to co-writing five of the songs.

In 2010, the legendary Italian singer Mina recorded Teitur's song "You Get Me" as a duet with Seal, which was the first single from her album Caramella, which went top 3 in Italy. Seal went on to record the song again, with David Foster producing, for Seal's album "Commitment", which charted in 12 countries, also recording it as a duet with Concha Buika (Spain), TinkaBelle (Switzerland) and Anna Eriksson (Finland).

In 2011, Teitur wrote a seven-piece song cycle for choir and orchestra called "Weekdays", which was performed in late 2011 by the Danish National Symphony Orchestra and the DR Girls choir in Copenhagen.

In 2012, Teitur performed live across the Netherlands with the Netherlands Wind Ensemble, while a film was shown which he commissioned and composed the score to, directed by Thomas Koba, under the title "Everyday Song", with additional music composed for the live show by Trondur Bogason. They also performed as part of the Copenhagen International Documentary Festival (CPH:DOX). During 2012, Teitur composed the music for the yet to be released indie film The Load directed by Kristian Sonderby.

In 2013, he wrote music to the sonnet requiem "Sommerfugledalen" by Inger Christensen for full choir, piano and strings. The 30-minute piece was premiered in Holstebro with 100 young choristers in celebration of the 75th birthday of the Holstebro Gymnasium og HF, where Teitur was a student. The same year, Teitur appeared as a singer with the Danish National Symphony Orchestra in a new Danish requiem by composer John Frandsen with words by Simon Grotian. Teitur sang six songs solo with organ. The requiem premiered in Koncerthuset in April 2013.

In 2015, Teitur wrote "Romeo Answers (Songs from Juliet Letters)" for Messer Quartet. The piece for voice, string quartet and computer voices is 23 songs based on Juliet Letters, letters administered by Juliet Club (Club di Giulietta) that writers send to Shakespeare's Juliet in Verona. The piece was premiered with electric strings in Engelsholm castle, Denmark in August, 2015.

In 2015, Teitur was a speaker at Ted Talks in Vancouver alongside speakers Marina Abramovic and Monica Lewinsky. Teitur spoke about intentions and songwriting and performed his songs "Home" and "I Was Just Thinking."

In 2016, Teitur wrote the music for the documentary "Who We Were" by director Sine Skibsholt. The documentary won a Robert Award for best documentary.

In 2017, eight of Teitur's songs were integrated in the hymnal of Church of Denmark, Kirkesangbogen.

In 2017, the album Ich bin das Chaos was released by Judith Holofernes. Teitur was the co-writer of nine songs and co-produced and arranged the album as well as playing guitar, piano and synths. The album debuted at no. 13 in the German chart.

In 2018, Teitur released Running Music together with Mads Bjørn which is electronic music for running, fitness and movement. The album went to no. 1 on Danish Electronica charts on iTunes.

In 2018, Mandy Patinkin released two of Teitur's songs "I Have Found My Happiness" and "Two Kids" for his album Diary: January 27 released on Nonesuch. In 2019 Mandy also recorded "To Be of Use" for his album Children and Art, alongside songs by artist like Rufus Wainwright and Tom Waits.

In 2019, Teitur appeared in the Danish TV series Toppen af Poppen, performing songs by six other well known artists, who also performed songs originally recorded by Teitur. In September 2019 the success of the show fueled Teitur's 2003 album Poetry & Aeroplanes going to no. 1 on the Danish iTunes charts, with three other of his releases in the top 20.

In 2019, Smuin Ballet in San Francisco made a production of "Confessions" by Val Caniparoli, using the music from Teitur and Nico Muhly's album of the same name.

In 2020, Teitur released a four track EP, Modern Era, with visuals based on photos by Simon Harsent

In 2022, Teitur performed a concert in Mindeparken for Queen Margrethe II 75th birthday - with his band, members of Aarhus Jazz Orchestra and Tina Dickow and mezzosoprano Andrea Pellegrini as special guests.

In 2023, Danish group Swan Lee released their comeback album The Garden with twelve songs co-written with Teitur.

== Production for others ==
- "Le Cheshire Cat et moi" - Nolwenn Leroy
- "Ich bin das Chaos" - Judith Holofernes
- "Wild and Young" - GRETA
- "A Tongue Full of Suns" - Raphael Gimenes
- "The Garden" - Swan Lee
- "Atlantic Hymns" - Frans Bak
- "Songs from a Social Distance" - Aarhus Jazz Orchestra
- "Seinferð" - Lea Kampmann
- "Kvæði" - Girls in Airports
- "Yule" - Dreamer's Circus

== Discography ==
=== Studio albums ===
Year	Album	Peak positions		Certification
Year	Album	DEN	NED	Certification
2003	Poetry & Aeroplanes	25	–	Gold
2006	Stay Under the Stars	9	–	Gold
2007	Káta Hornið	–	–	
2008	The Singer	6	–	Gold
2010	Let the Dog Drive Home	9	94	
2013	Story Music	7	–	
2016	Confessions		–	
2018	Running Music	1	–	
2018	I Want to Be Kind		–	
2021	Cazador de Ostras			
2023	Songs from a Social Distance			
2024	Kvæði			
2024	Yule			

=== Music ===
- Den lysende stråle for symphony orchestra, recorded by Danish Chamber Orchestra (2026)
- Wind Speeds for saxophones (2025)
- Snowfall for symphony orchestra (2025)
- Teens: Questions to Teenagers - for voice, wind ensemble, piano, strings and electronics (2024)
- Skjaldur for saxophone and string quartet (2022)
- Songs from a Social Distance for big band with words by Roy Freirich (2021)
- Funnin gittari for solo guitar (2021)
- Børn leger udenfor for guitar duo (2021)
- Ringtones for harpsichord, piano, violin and cello released by The LightsOut Trio with Elina Albach (2020)
- Chinese Whispers (Hviskeleg) for guitar quartet (2017) Released by The Danish Guitar Quartet (2020)
- Sum nattúran for voices and mixed chamber ensemble (2018)
- Sangir til kamarkórið for full choir, released by Tórshavnar Kamarkór with Bernhardur Wilkinson (2018)
- Romeo Answers (Songs from Juliet Letters) for voice, string quartet and computer voices (2015)
- The Lapidary Song for viola, cello, drone quartet and pre-recorded material (2015)
- Desert Island Music for clarinet in Bb and piano (2015)
- Y Arpeggios for keyboard or percussion (2015)
- Sommerfugledalen for full choir, strings and piano (2013)
- Five Year-old Girl Skips Down the Street and Finds Ring for harp and vibraphone (2013)
- Everyday Song for wind ensemble, percussion, voice and moving pictures (2012)
- La Mattina (with Bent Sørensen) for strings, piano and voice (2012)
- The Load for flute, alto flute, trumpet, piano and accordion (2011)
- Weekdays for full choir, strings, percussion, piano and harp (2011)
- Confessions (with Nico Muhly) for recorder, strings, lute, harpsichord and voice (2008)
- Plagues for recorder, organ, piano, guitar and electronics (2008)

=== EPs ===
- Four Songs (2012)
- Four Songs and B Sides (2012) (8 track Vinyl only version)
- Monogram Sessions (2013) (3 songs for Radio24syv vinyl only release)
- Y Arpeggios for piano (2017)
- Modern Era (2020) (4 track online only release)
- Sangir til kamarkórið (2023)

=== Compilations ===
- All My Mistakes (2009)

=== Soundtrack appearances ===
- Aquamarine (film)#Original soundtrack|Aquamarine Motion Picture Soundtrack (2006)
- My Super Ex-Girlfriend (film)#Original soundtrack|My Super Ex-Girlfriend Motion Picture Soundtrack (2006)
- Andersens Drømme (H.C Andersen's Dreams) (2007)
- Songs for Tibet: The Art of Peace (Dalai Lama compilation album, 2008)
- The New Pope (TV Series, 2022)
- Ragnarok - Ragnarok Theme Pt. II (TV Series, 2024)
- Matters of the Heart (Fuld af Kærlighed) - Title song (Film, 2024)

=== DVD releases ===
- A Night At The Opera (2010)
- Den 11. time (The eleventh Hour, Danish talkshow, Season 3) (2008)

=== Collaborations ===
- "Choux Pastry Heart", co-writer with Corinne Bailey Rae on the album Corinne Bailey Rae
- "I Won't Let You Lie to Yourself", co-writer with Corinne Bailey Rae and Marc Nelkin; also on the album Corinne Bailey Rae (Deluxe version)
- "Cloud Gazing", co-writer with Gordie Sampson on the album Sunburn
- "All My Mistakes", appearance with Tarira on Songs For Tibet, 2009
- "Rubber & Soul", appearance with Ane Brun on the album Duets
- "Confessions Songcycle", co-writer and appearance with Nico Muhly for the 'Holland Baroque Society', first performed at the CrossLinx Festival in Holland in March 2008.
- "Le Cheshire cat & moi", co-writer, producer and arranger of the album with Nolwenn Leroy, 2009
- "Rocket to the Moon", co-writer with Émilie Simon on the album The Big Machine, 2009
- "Let's Go Dancing", appearance with Tina Dico on the album Welcome Back Colour, 2010
- "I Can't Love You Anymore", co-writer with Marit Larsen on the album Spark, 2011
- "Alting var smukkere dengang", string arranger for Mouritz/Hørslev on the album Allermindst dig selv, 2013
- "Swimmer", appearance with Jakob Bro for remixes of album December Song, 2013
- "Requiem", with Danish National Symphony Orchestra singer of six songs in requiem by John Frandsen with words by Simon Grotian, 2013
- "Ich bin das Chaos", co-writer, co-producer and arranger with Judith Holofernes
- "The Future That Cannot Be Known" (original and 'Quarantine Edition') single collaboration with UNSECRET. Credited to UNSECRET X Teitur, 2020.
- "Seasick", guest duet vocal on song by Dicte, 2021
- Ich War so gern gut" by Judith Holofernes. Co-written by Teitur and Aloe Blacc. Also used in German Film "Es ist nur eine phase hase", directed by Florian Gallenberger, 2021.
- "The Garden" album by Swan Lee, co-writer and exec-producer, 2022.
- "Heaven" single by Swan Lee co-writer and exec producer, September 2022
- "Got Away With Murder", guest vocal with Swan Lee, co-writer and exec producer, November 2022.
- "Louise" co-writer and guest vocalist with Eee Gee.
- "Seinferð", with Lea Kampmann - producer, co-writer, arranger, piano and lap steel. October 2024

== Awards ==
2025 Wilhelm Hansen Fondens Hæderspris

2025 Robert Awards best song (Matters of the Heart, nominated)

2023 Nordic Music Prize (nominated)

2023 Mentanarvirðisløn Landsins Faroese cultural prize.

2021 Ridder af Dannebrog, knighted by Queen Margrethe II of Denmark.

2005 Rødovre Musikpris

2003 Shortlist Music Prize for Poetry & Aeroplanes (nominated).

== Personal life ==
Teitur has been married to Ingilín D. Strøm, member of the Løgting, since 2016. They have one son.

He is also close friends with the singer Judith Holofernes of Wir Sind Helden.
