= Colorado Ballet =

American ballet company and academy

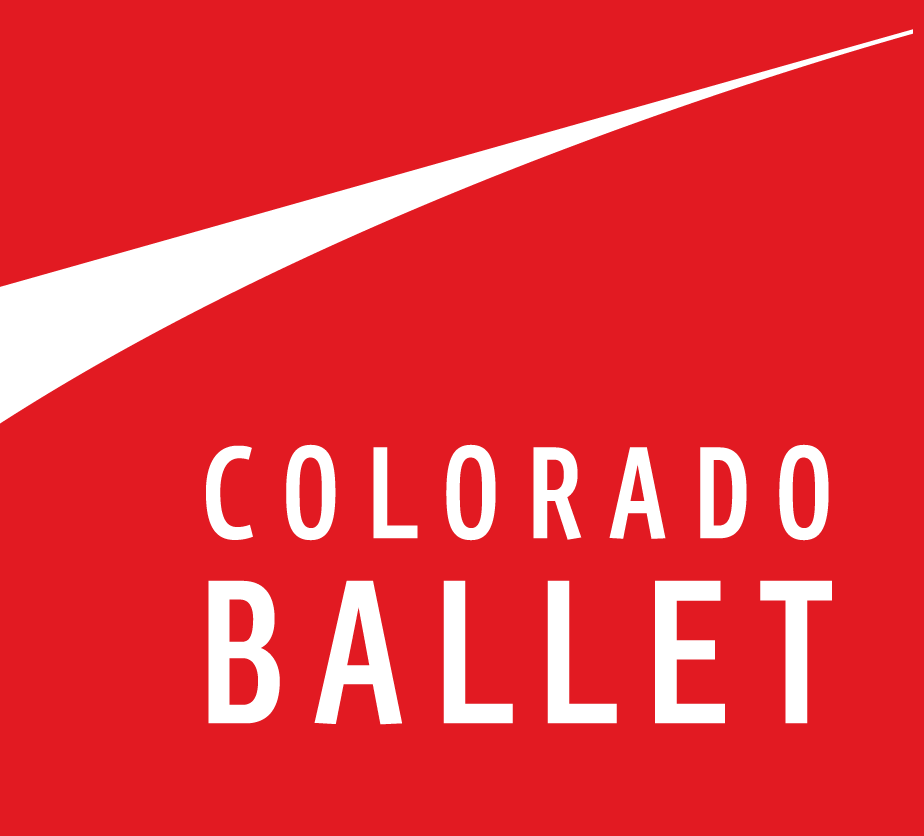

General information
- Name: Colorado Ballet
- Previous names: Colorado Concert Ballet
- Year founded: 1961
- Founders: Freidann Parker and Lillian Covillo
- Principal venue: Ellie Caulkins Opera House
- Website: coloradoballet.org

Senior staff
- Executive Director: Sameed Afghani

Artistic staff
- Artistic Director: Gil Boggs
- Ballet Masters: Sandra Brown, Lorita Travaglia, Maria Mosina
- Music Director: Adam Flatt

Other
- Orchestra: Colorado Ballet Orchestra
- Official school: Colorado Ballet Academy
- Associated schools: Colorado Ballet Academy

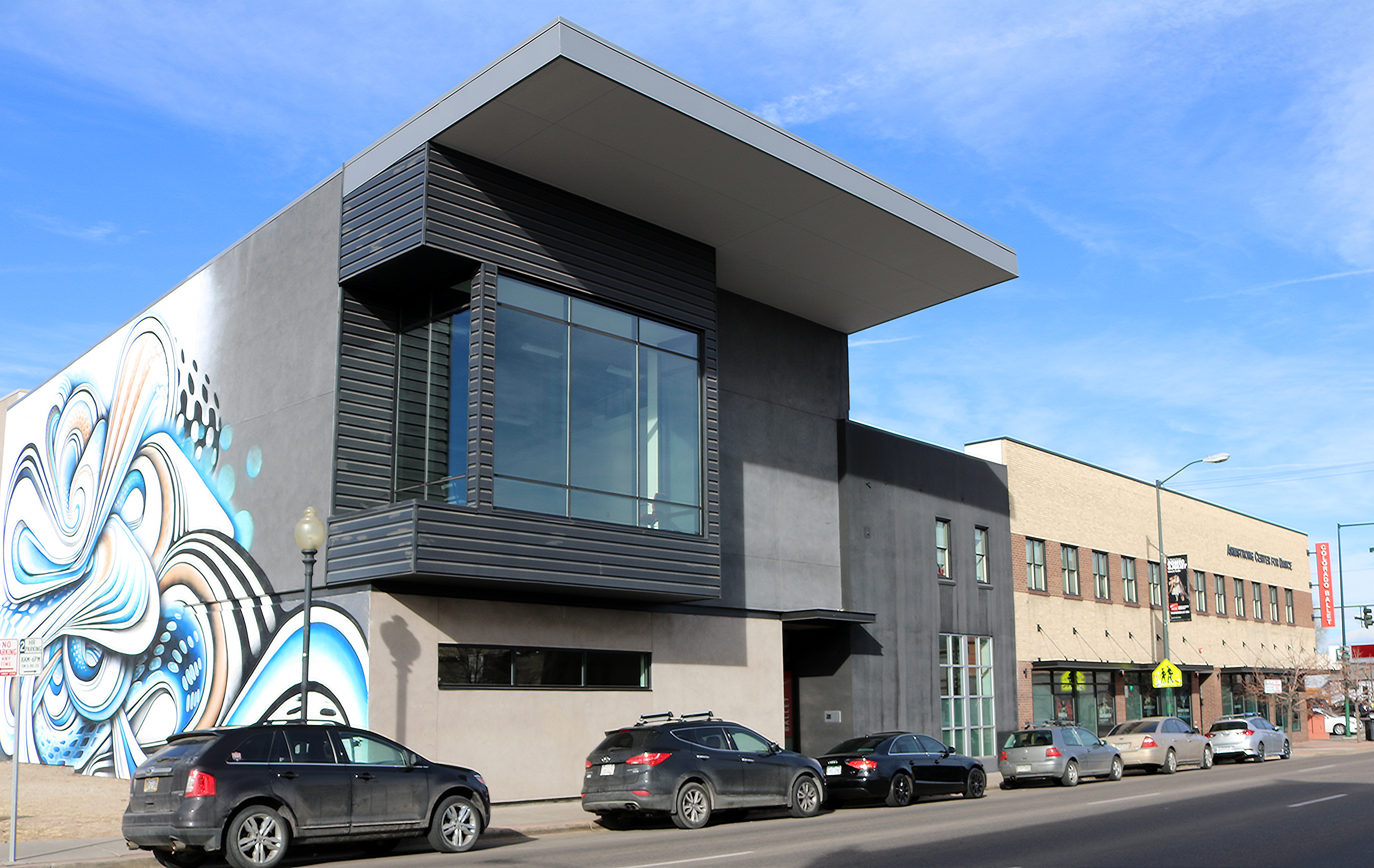
Colorado Ballet's home on Santa Fe Drive in Denver.

Colorado Ballet encompasses a 40-member professional performing ballet company, a studio company for advanced dance students, an academy, and an education and outreach department. Based in downtown Denver, Colorado, Colorado Ballet serves more than 125,000 patrons each year.

The professional company performs primarily at the Ellie Caulkins Opera House in the Denver Performing Arts Complex and one show each year at the Robert and Judi Newman Center for Performing Arts at the University of Denver. Colorado Ballet performs classical ballets and contemporary dance works. The Colorado Ballet Orchestra performs with the Company at the Ellie Caulkins Opera House, at five productions a year.

With an annual operating budget exceeding $14.8 million, the company employs more than 150 people on either a full-time or part-time basis during the year.

Colorado Ballet received the 2009 Colorado Masterpieces Award. As part of the award, Colorado Ballet toured Colorado in the 2009–2010 season as a part of American Masterpieces: Three Centuries of Artistic Genius initiative, funded by the Colorado Council on the Arts.

Colorado Ballet has performed at the Vail International Dance Festival in 2011, 2015, 2017, and 2024.

In 2013, Colorado Ballet purchased a building in Denver's Art District on Santa Fe. The company moved to its new location in August 2014.

== History ==
In 1961, Lillian Covillo and Freidann Parker established Colorado Concert Ballet to showcase talented students they had been teaching at their ballet school. Their first production, The Nutcracker, played to sold-out houses in Denver's Bonfils Theatre. By 1968, the Company hit the road for its first tour of the state. By 1976, Colorado Concert Ballet produced 33 performances of The Nutcracker and three other productions that season. By October of that year, Colorado Concert ballet achieved full professional status with a total roster of eight professional dancers. Two years later, the board of trustees changed the company's name to Colorado Ballet.

In 1987, Parker and Covillo conducted a nationwide search, at their own expense, for a new artistic director. With their choice of Martin Fredmann, they changed the course of Colorado Ballet. Also that year, a lagging economy in Denver forced Colorado Ballet to look at an emerging national trend among dance companies and as a result entered into an alliance with Tampa Ballet. Colorado Ballet and Tampa Ballet joined forces, performing 18 weeks in Tampa and 18 weeks in Denver. The partnership remained successful for three years, and in 1990, the board of trustees decided to the dissolve the alliance and move the Company permanently to Denver.

In 1993, Colorado Ballet made its New York debut to favorable reviews. In 1995, the Company formed Colorado Ballet II, which is now known as Colorado Ballet's Studio Company. By the time the Company celebrated its 40th anniversary in the early 2000s, the organization's annual budget had grown to $5.1 million, with 30 professional dancers, 20 apprentices and an academy with 250 students. In March 2006, Gil Boggs, former principal dancer with American Ballet Theatre, was hired as the new artistic director.

After more than two decades of leasing a space near the Colorado State Capitol, Colorado Ballet purchased a building at the north end of Denver's Art District on Santa Fe in 2013. The Company renovated the space and moved into its new home in August 2014.

During the 2016-2017 season, Colorado Ballet's ticketing revenue exceeded more than $4 million for the first time and more than 87,000 people watched Colorado Ballet's productions. In December 2016, Colorado Ballet's The Nutcracker was named the best-loved Nutcracker in the 10th Annual Goldstar National Nutcracker Award contest, winning this coveted honor in a field that included more than 80 other productions throughout the U.S.

== Artistic leaders ==
The artistic leadership of the Colorado Ballet includes (as of 2017-2018 season):

Artistic Director: Gil Boggs, former principal dancer of American Ballet Theatre

Ballet Masters: Sandra Brown, Lorita Travaglia, Maria Mosina

Music Director/Principal Conductor: Adam Flatt

Associate Conductor: Catherine Sailer

Company Pianist: Natalia Arefieva

Academy Director: Erica Fischbach

Academy Principal: Bernadette Torres

== Production Department ==
- Pete Nielson, Production Manager
- Hally Albers, Production Manager, Stage Manager
- N. James Whitehill III, Director of Production (2021-present)

== Dancers ==
Colorado Ballet consists of 40 professional dancers from around the world (as of 2024-2025 season):

=== Studio Company ===
The Studio Company is a pre-professional training program; members are selected by audition. The program is designed to offer young dancers training and experience working with the professional company.

== 2018–2019 season ==
Colorado Ballet's 2018–2019 season will open on October 5, 2018.

Sleeping Beauty (choreography by Marius Petipa, music by P. I. Tchaikovsky)

The Nutcracker (choreography by Marius Petipa, music by P. I. Tchaikovsky)

The Wizard of Oz (choreography by Septime Webre, music by Matthew Pierce)

Tour de Force (collaborative production with choreography by artistic staff members of Colorado Ballet, Garrett Ammon of Wonderbound, and Cleo Parker Robinson of Cleo Parker Robinson Dance Ensemble)

Ballet MasterWorks: Carmina Burana (choreography by Fernand Nault, music by Carl Orff)

== 2017–2018 season ==
Colorado Ballet's 2017-2018 season opened on October 6, 2017.

Dracula (choreography by Michael Pink, music by Philip Feeney)

The Nutcracker (choreography after Marius Petipa, music by P. I. Tchaikovsky)

Romeo and Juliet (choreography by Derek Deane, music by Sergei Prokofiev)

Ballet Director's Choice (includes Pillar of Fire choreographed by Antony Tudor, music by Arnold Schoenberg; Brief Fling choreographed by Twyla Tharp, music by Michel Colombier and Percy Grainger; and a third work)

== 2016–2017 season ==
Colorado Ballet's 2016-2017 season opened on October 7, 2016.

Swan Lake (choreography after Marius Petipa and Lev Ivanov set and updated by former American Ballet Theatre principals Amanda McKerrow and John Gardner and Sandra Brown, Ballet Mistress for Colorado Ballet, music by P. I. Tchaikovsky)

The Nutcracker (choreography after Marius Petipa, music by P. I. Tchaikovsky)

Ballet MasterWorks (includes The Firebird choreographed by Yuri Possokhov, music by Igor Stravinsky; Serenade choreographed by George Balanchine, music by P.I. Tchaikovsky; and Petite Mort choreographed by Jiří Kylián, music by Wolfgang Amadeus Mozart)

The Little Mermaid (choreography by Lynne Taylor-Corbett, music by Michael Moricz), opening with Bruch Violin Concerto No.1 choreographed by Clark Tippet, music by Max Bruch)

== 2015–2016 season ==
Colorado Ballet's 2015-2016 season opened on October 2, 2015.

La Sylphide (choreography by August Bournonville, music by Herman Severin Løvenskiold)

The Nutcracker (choreography after Marius Petipa, music by P.I. Tchaikovsky)

Alice in Wonderland (choreography by Septime Webre, music by Matthew Pierce)

Ballet Director's Choice (includes The Angel of Buenos Aires by Lorita Travaglia, Wolfgang (for Webb) by Dominic Walsh, Light Rain pas de deux by Gerald Arpino and It's Not a Cry pas de deux by Amy Seiwert)

== 2014–2015 season ==
Colorado Ballet's 2014-2015 season opened on September 26, 2014.

A Midsummer Night's Dream (choreography by Christopher Wheeldon, music by Felix Mendelssohn)

Dracula (choreography by Michael Pink, music by Philip Feeney)

The Nutcracker (choreography after Marius Petipa, music by P.I. Tchaikovsky)

Ballet MasterWorks (includes Concerto Barocco choreographed by George Balanchine, music by Johann Sebastian Bach; Fancy Free (ballet) choreographed by Jerome Robbins, music by Leonard Bernstein; and a new work)

Peter and the Wolf (choreography by Michael Smuin, music by Sergei Prokofiev, opening with Bruch Violin Concerto No.1 choreographed by Clark Tippet, music by Max Bruch)

== 2013–2014 season ==
Giselle (music by Adolphe Adam)

The Nutcracker (music by P.I. Tchaikovsky)

Cinderella (music by Prokofiev)

Director's Choice (Traveling Alone choreographed by Amy Seiwert; Edwaard Liang's Feast of the Gods; and a new work)

== 2012–2013 season ==
The Sleeping Beauty (choreographed by Marius Petipa, music by P.I. Tchaikovsky)

The Nutcracker (music by P.I. Tchaikovsky)

Ballet MasterWorks (includes Igor Stravinsky's The Rite of Spring with choreography by Glen Tetley, George Balanchine's Theme and Variations with music by P.I. Tchaikovsky, and a new work by Val Caniparoli of San Francisco Ballet

Light/The Holocaust and Humanity Project (choreography by Stephen Mills of Ballet Austin)

== 2011–2012 season ==
Swan Lake (choreographed by Marius Petipa and Lev Ivanov, music by P.I. Tchaikovsky)

The Nutcracker (music by P.I. Tchaikovsky)

Peter Pan (choreography by Michael Pink, music by Philip Feeney)

Tribute (choreography by Emery LeCrone, Jodie Gates and Amy Seiwert)

== 2010–2011 season ==
Anniversary Triple Bill (Feast of the Gods - choreography by Edwaard Liang, "…smile with my heart" - choreography by Lar Lubovitch and The Faraway - choreography by Matthew Neenan)

Dracula (choreography by Michael Pink, music by Philip Feeney)

The Nutcracker (music by P.I. Tchaikovsky)

Romeo and Juliet (choreography by Alun Jones)

== 2009–2010 season ==
Great Galloping Gottschalk (choreographed by Lynne Taylor-Corbett, music by Louis Moreau Gottschalk)

Rodeo (choreographed by Agnes de Mille, music by A. Copland)

Don Quixote (choreographed by Marius Petipa, music by Ludwig Minkus)

The Nutcracker (music by P.I. Tchaikovsky)

Beauty and the Beast (choreographed by Domy Reiter-Soffer, music by Seen-yee Lam)

Echoing of Trumpets (choreographed by Antony Tudor)

Celts (choreographed by Lila York)

== Repertoire ==
Since 1961, The Nutcracker has been in the Colorado Ballet's repertoire every holiday season. Although primarily a classical ballet company, the Company's repertoire ranges from classical to contemporary ballets.

Ballet	Choreographer	Composer
...smile with my heart	L. Lubovitch	M. Laird (Fantasie on Themes by R. Rodgers)
Afternoon of a Faun	V. Nijinsky, staged by I. Youskevitch	C. Debussy
ALICE (in wonderland)	S. Webre	M. Pierce
Among Silken Cords	L. Wymmer	W.A. Mozart
Apollo	G. Balanchine, staged by P.Neary	I. Stravinsky
Appalachian Spring	M. Graham, staged by T. Capuccilli, J. Herring, J. Eibler	A. Copland
Archetypes	E. LeCrone	T. Riley
Ave Maria	D. Rhoden	Giulio Caccini, vocals by Kagen Paley
A Little Love	M. Fredmann	Songs sung by Nina Simone
Beauty and the Beast	M. Fredmann	M. Ravel
Billy the Kid	E. Loring, staged by H. Sayette	A. Copland
Bruch Violin Concerto No. 1	C. Tippet	M. Bruch
Buffalo Bill's Saloon	A. Erb	R. Jarboe, performed by Tim and Molly O'Brien
Carmina Burana	G. Gonzales, P. Renzetti, J. Wallace	C. Orff
Celts	L. York	Traditional Irish music
Centennial Suite	M. Fredmann	R. Thompson
Cinderella (3 Acts)	M. Fredmann	S. Prokofiev
Company B	P. Taylor, staged by R. Andrien	Songs recorded by The Andrews Sisters
Concerto Barocco	G. Balanchine, staged by P. Neary	J.S. Bach
Configurations	C. Goh, staged by J. Schergen	S. Barber
Coppélia	M. Fredmann	L. Delibes
Cry and Silence	M. Murdmaa	K. Sink
Diana and Actaeon (pas de deux)	A. Vaganova	C. Pugni
De Profundis	J. Lang	Arvo Pärt
Don Quixote (3 Acts)	M. Petipa/ A. Gorsky	L. Minkus
Dracula	M. Pink	P. Feeney
Dreamspace	M. Fredmann	G. Mahler, W. Piston, H. Hanson, C. Ives, S. Coleridge-Taylor, A. Hovhaness
The Dying Swan	M. Fokine, staged by N. Krassovska	C. Saint-Saens
Earth Tribe	R. Harris	D. Ross; Romanthony
Echoing of Trumpets	A. Tudor	B. Martinu
Elysium	T. Korobeynikova	Meredith Monk and Kronos Quartet
Embellish	Jodie Gates	Wolfgang Amadeus Mozart
Façade	F. Ashton, staged by A. Grant	W. Walton
Feast of the Gods	E. Liang	O. Respighi
Firebird	Y. Possokhov	I. Stravinsky
Flames of Paris (solo)	J. Lang	R. Schumann
Giselle (2 Acts)	J. Perrot/J. Coralli, staged by Gil Boggs	A. Adam
Great Galloping Gottschalk	Lynne Taylor-Corbett, staged by Jeff Gribler	Louis Moreau Gottschalk
The Hunchback of Notre Dame	T. Ishida	C. Pugni
The Hunchback of Notre Dame	M. Pink	P. Feeney
In the Upper Room	T. Tharp, staged by S. Washington	P. Glass
Inversion	J. Wallace	S. Barber
JamNation	D. McKayle	C. Dobrian, K. Akagi, L. Armstrong, C. Parker, D. Ellington, A.C. Jobin, D. Reinhart, S. Grapelli, J. Johnson
La Bayadere (Act II)	M. Petipa, staged by M. Stavitskaya	L. Minkus
Land Beyond Horizons	H. Garza	T. Bell
La Sylphide	A. Bournonville, staged by Z. Dubrovskaya, S. Kozadeyev	H. Lovenskjold
La Vivandiere	A. Saint-Leon, staged by P. Renzetti	C. Pugni
Le Beau Danube	L. Massine, staged by G. Verdak	J. Strauss II
Le Spectre de la Rose	M. Fokine, staged by T. Armour	C. Von Weber
Light/The Holocaust & Humanity Project	Stephen Mills	Steve Reich (Tehillim), Evelyn Glennie (Rhythm Song), Michael Gordon (Weather), Arvo Pärt (Tabula Rasa), Philip Glass (Tirol Concerto)
The Little Mermaid	Lynne Taylor-Corbett	Michael Moricz
Masquerade Suite	M. Fredmann	A. Khatchaturian
A Midsummer Night's Dream	C. Wheeldon	F. Mendelssohn
Miraculous Mandarin	S. Kozadayev	B. Bartok
Mon Dieu (solo)	M. Fredmann	Sung by Edith Piaf
Nine Sinatra Songs	T. Tharp, staged by S. Washington	Songs recorded by F. Sinatra
The Nutcracker (2 Acts)	M. Fredmann, Additional Choreography by S. Brown, staged by L. Travaglia and S. Brown	P.I. Tchaikovsky
Of Blessed Memory	S. Welch	J. Cantaloube
Picture of Sedalia	P. Pucci	S. Joplin
Peter Pan	G. Conzales/ A. Thompson	L. Delibes
Peter Pan	Michael Pink	Philip Feeney
Petite Mort	Jiří Kylián	W. A. Mozart
Pounds and Stomps	D. Varone	Songs by the Yardbirds
Rachmaninov Second	K. Uralsky	S. Rachmaninov
Raymonda (Act III)	M. Petipa, staged by M. Stavitskaya	A. Glazunov
Ricordanza	M. Fredmann	F. Liszt
The Rite of Spring	Glen Tetley	Igor Stravinsky
The River	A. Ailey, staged by M. Chaya	D. Ellington
Rodeo	A. de Mille, staged by P. Sutherland	A. Copland
Romeo & Juliet (3 Acts)	M. Fredmann	S. Prokofiev
Rubies	G. Balanchine, staged by B. Cook	I. Stravinsky
Sachertorte	M. Fredmann	Strauss Family
Second Exposure	D. Grand Moultrie	R. Romaneiro
Serenade	G. Balanchine, staged by P. Neary	P.I. Tchaikovsky
Silent Woods (pas de deux)	M. Fredmann	A. Dvorak
Size Nine Spirit	P. Pucci	B. Goodman
The Sleeping Beauty	Marius Petipa, staged by M. Daukayev, J. Labsan	P.I. Tchaikovsky
Soul of Porcelain	O. Messina	P.I. Tchaikovsky
Stars and Stripes	G. Balanchine, staged by B. Cook	J.P. Sousa
Swan Lake (4 Acts)	M. Petipa/L. Ivanov, staged by S. Kozadayev, Z. Dubroskaya, A. McKerrow, & J. Gardner	P.I. Tchaikovsky
Talisman (pas de deux)	M. Petipa	R. Drigo
Theme and Variations	George Balanchine, staged by P. Neary	P.I. Tchaikovsky
Things Left Unsaid	A. Seiwert	F. Mendelssohn
Traveling Alone	A. Seiwert	M. Richter
Troy Game	R. North, staged by J. Moss	B. Downes
Vital Sensations	D. Moultrie	Puente, Sidestepper, R. Size/ Reprazent
Western Symphony	G. Balanchine, staged by B. Cook	H. Kay
When the Lad for Longing Sighs	M. Fredmann, J. Levinson	G. Butterworth
Where the Wild Things Are	S. Webre	R. Woolf
Who Cares?	G. Balanchine, staged by J. Fugate	G. Gershwin
Wingborne	L. Houlton	A. Dvorak
Winter Moons	P. Tate	J. Tate
Without Words	T. Shimazaki	T. Kako, R. Eno, L.M. Gottschalk, F. Mendelssohn
Yes, Virginia, Another Piano Ballet	P. Anastos	F. Chopin

== Academy ==
The Colorado Ballet Academy is the official school of the Colorado Ballet Company, located in Denver, CO. The academy provides training to students ages 1 ½ through adult, beginner through professional

The academy begins teaching students from ages 3 through 6 for creative dance and pre-ballet, two classes that lay the foundation for further study of classical ballet

Beginning at age seven, students are placed in Level 1 and advance according to age, experience, and ability. The academy curriculum is designed to guide students from their first introduction to the art through a full course of ballet study. During their time at Colorado Ballet Academy, students take classes in technique, pointe work, pas de deux, modern, jazz as well as vital conditioning classes.

The Colorado Ballet Academy's designed method follows a structured sequence of training stages intended to increase student's technical skills, stamina and discipline in accordance with their age and physical development.

Academy students perform in showcase performances as well as Colorado Ballet's professional ballets, including the annual productions of The Nutcracker. The academy is located in downtown Denver.

== Education and Community Engagement ==
Colorado Ballet's Education and Community Engagement department serves in-need students, teachers, families, people with disabilities and lifelong learners in Colorado. Colorado Ballet's outreach programs make more than 35,000 contacts each year in 225 schools/organizations.

Education & Outreach Includes:

- After School Programs
- School Workshops: Dance Technique & Arts Integration
- In-school Assembly Program
- Student Performances - Local & Remote
- Community Performances
- Study Materials and Activity Guides
- Educator Appreciation and Professional Development
- Adult Education

=== Programs ===
Be Beautiful Be Yourself - Based on Boston Ballet's "Adaptive Dance" program and supported by the Anna and John J. Sie Center for Down Syndrome at Children's Hospital Colorado and the Global Down Syndrome Foundation, the Be Beautiful Be Yourself Dance program provides 10 weekly dance classes to ten 5-9 year-old-children with Down syndrome.

Five by Five Project - The 5 X 5 Project is the Mayor's Office for Education and Children's program designed to offer Head Start families opportunities to give their children five cultural experiences by the age of five. Colorado Ballet has been a partnering organization in this program for four years.

Leap N Learn (formerly (Dance Renaissance) - Leap N Learn is an after school residency that lasts 10–15 weeks, classes focus on creative movement and ballet. The students study a variety of dance concepts while working on spatial awareness, problem solving, and strengthening the body and brain. The program culminates with a performance for the parents, school, and community.

Rhythm and Grace - Rhythm & Grace is an adaptation of the nationally recognized Dance for PD® model created by the Mark Morris Dance Group and the Brooklyn Parkinson Group. This national model is offered in more than 40 communities in the U.S. and Europe. The Parkinson Association of the Rockies is the first Parkinson's-oriented Colorado organization to bring this dance-focused method of physical therapy to the Denver community. Since its inception in September 2011, approximately 50 individuals with Parkinson's disease have participated in the program.

School workshops, assemblies and field trips - Colorado Ballet's education and outreach department offers school workshops and assemblies teaching students about dance. In addition, the department offers students discounted tickets to the professional Company's final dress rehearsal for selected shows each season.
