= Winged Creatures =

Winged Creatures may refer to:

- Winged Creatures (film)
- Winged Creatures (novel), which the film is based on.
