= Jayne Regan Pink =

British dancer and performing artist

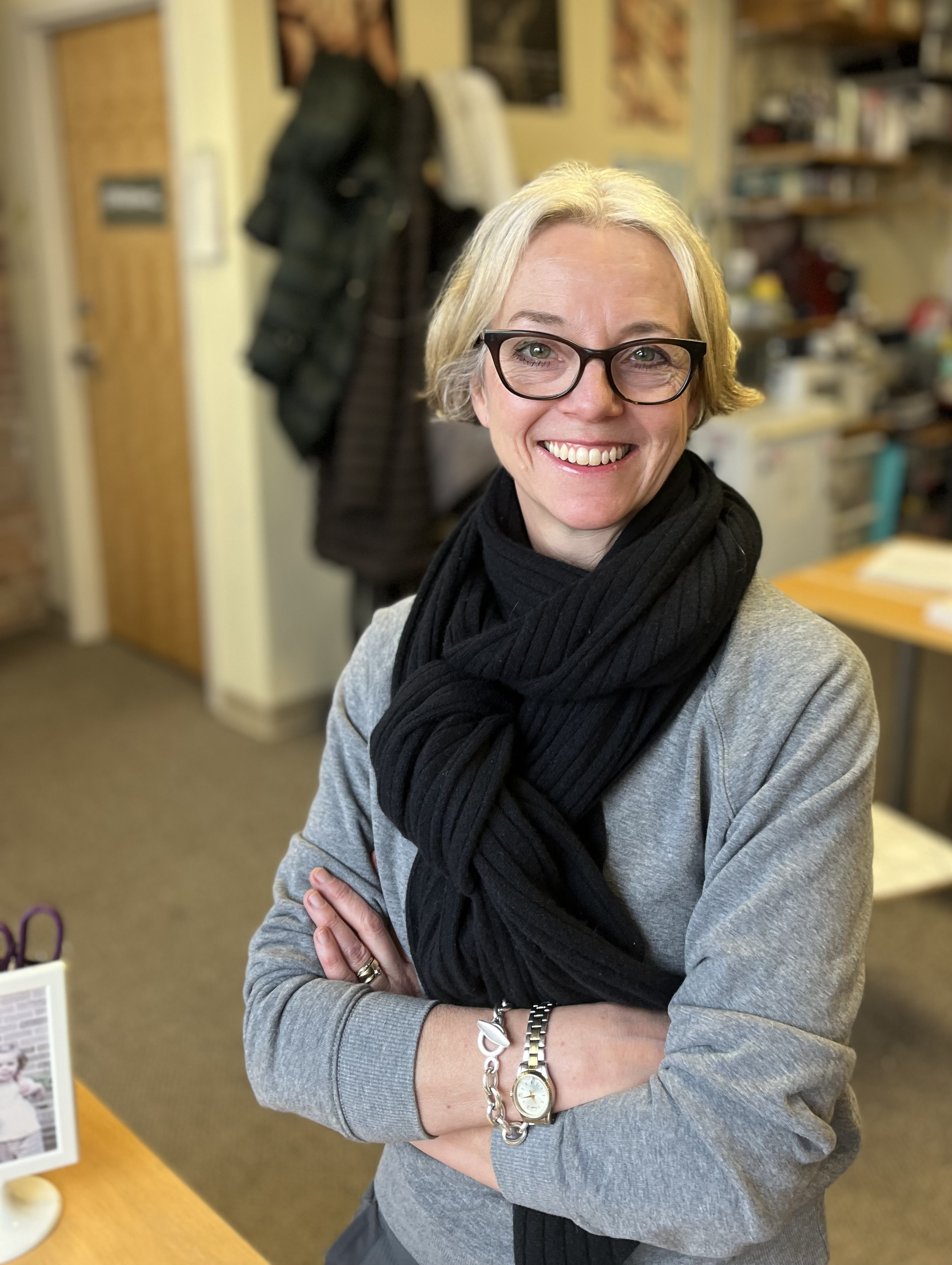
- Regan Pink in 2023
- Born: 4 March 1968 (age 58); Newham, London, England
- Occupations: Dancer, choreographer, repetiteur
- Years active: 1986–present
- Spouse: Michael Pink (m. 1998)

Jayne Regan Pink (born 4 March 1968) is a British dancer, choreographer, repetiteur, dialect coach and artistic associate. She studied at the Royal Ballet School and spent much of her professional career as a principal dancer with Northern Ballet Theatre. She created leading roles in most of the company's repertoire between 1986 and 1998 alongside collaborators including director Christopher Gable, director-choreographer Michael Pink, composer Philip Feeney and designer Lez Brotherston. She has been referred to as "one of the jewels in the crown of English dance" and "one of the finest dramatic dancers of today, ranking alongside Lynn Seymour, Marcia Haydee, Anna Laguna and Elaine McDonald." Since retiring from dance, she has moved to Milwaukee, Wisconsin with her husband, Artistic Director of the Milwaukee Ballet Michael Pink. She has served as a choreographer, movement director, dialect coach and repetiteur in Milwaukee and internationally. She currently serves as Artistic Associate with Renaissance Theaterworks.

== Early life ==
Jayne Regan was born in Newham, London, England in 1968 to Colin Regan and Marjorie Regan (née Gibbs). She was the second of three children. Growing up, she attended a Catholic school.

== Career ==
=== Training ===
Regan Pink was six years old when she began her training with Francesca Highfield. Later, she trained with Sulamith Messerer and Richard Glasstone, under whose tutelage she became a scholar in the Cecchetti method. During this time, Regan Pink also attended open classes with Anita Young and Patricia Linton, both formerly of The Royal Ballet.

At age 15, Regan Pink won the Cyril W. Beaumont scholarship to attend the Royal Ballet School. There, she was instructed by Laura Connor.

=== Northern Ballet Theatre ===
At age 17, Regan Pink auditioned for Northern Ballet Theatre and joined the company's corps de ballet. At the time of her joining, Northern Ballet Theatre was under the directorship of Robert de Warren. In 1987, she danced in NBT's production of A Simple Man, a ballet about the Life of the painter L.S. Lowry, directed and choreographed by Gillian Lynne. It was filmed by Granada Television; the film was nominated for two BAFTA Awards and won one. The ballet and film featured the actor dancer Christopher Gable, who went on to become the artistic director of the Northern Ballet Theatre, changing the course of Regan Pink's career. Later that year, Gable cast her in her first featured role as the Pupil in Fleming Flindt's one-act ballet La leçon, based on the Eugene Ionesco story.

Regan Pink's performance in La leçon led to her promotion to principal dancer. John Percival says Regan Pink was Gable's "supreme muse throughout this period ... It was Gable’s good fortune to find the newly-recruited Regan when he first arrived, but it has been his skill to recognize and develop her unique qualities so that today her talents have become synonymous with the high calibre of the work that the company now produces."

As a principal dancer under Gable, Regan Pink created the roles of Giselle in Giselle (1990), Juliet in Romeo and Juliet (1991), Odette in Swan Lake (1992), Belle in A Christmas Carol (1992), Cinderella in Cinderella (1993), Mina Harker in Dracula (1996) and Fleur de Lys in The Hunchback of Notre Dame (1998).

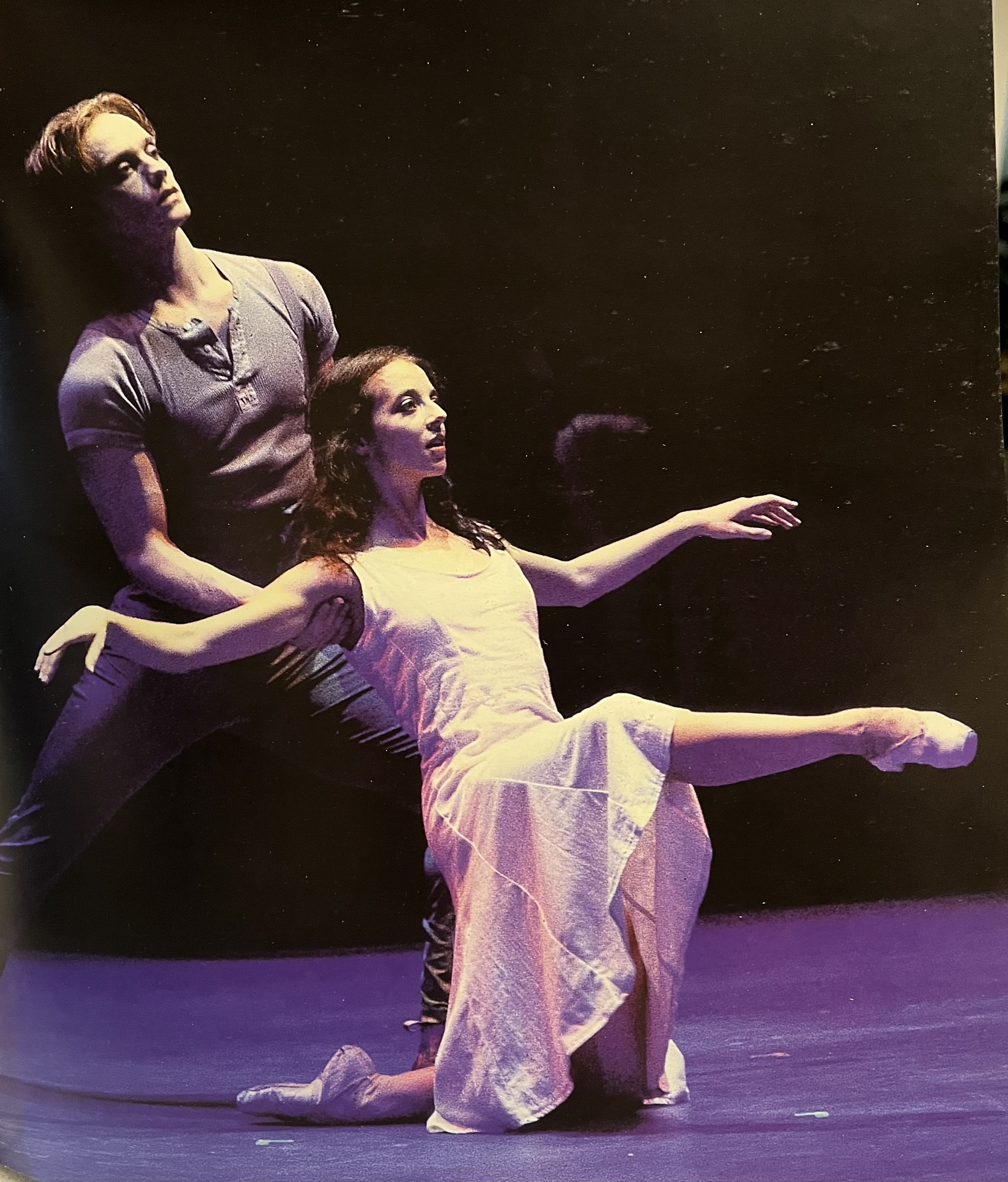
Jayne Regan Pink performs the title role in Cinderella.

During this period, considered by some to be a seminal period in dance drama in the United Kingdom, Regan Pink collaborated on more than a dozen productions with Christopher Gable, composer Philip Feeney, designer Lez Brotherston and choreographer and NBT associate artistic director Michael Pink. Gable, Feeney, Brotherston and Pink had first collaborated in 1989 on Strange Meeting, a one act ballet based on the poems of Wilfred Owen, after being introduced by Northern Ballet chairman Jeremy Fry. Regan Pink collaborated with Michael Pink specifically on Swan Lake, Giselle, The Hunchback of Notre Dame and Dracula.

In Romeo and Juliet, she originally danced opposite William Walker as Romeo; their combined performance was called "spellbinding" and "exemplary both in dancing and in every dramatic nuance." Her performance as Juliet received some of the most substantial praise of her career, with reviewers calling her "lithe and spirited," "touchingly vulnerable," and "the jewel of the production." Others stated that "her technique is impeccable and her characterisation develops to such unbearable intensity as to make the role her own." This production of Romeo and Juliet was filmed at the Civic Theatre in Halifax, England, and aired by the BBC on Christmas Day. The film was nominated for a BAFTA Award.

Regan Pink originally danced the title role in Giselle opposite Denis Malinkine; The Sunday Times stated the duo gave "splendidly strong, emotionally subtle performances in the lead roles." After her performance in Swan Lake, the Sheffield Star remarked, "this has always been Jayne Regan's show – when you tire of this performance, it's time to cancel your subscription to the ballet."

=== Retirement from dancing ===
After Gable's early death in 1998, Regan Pink mostly retired from dancing. In 2000, she appeared in the West End production of Gillian Lynne's pantomime Dick Whittington.

Between 1998 and 2002, Regan Pink served as repetiteur and assistant, working with her husband on productions with the Boston Ballet, Royal New Zealand Ballet, Norwegian National Ballet and Colorado Ballet.

In 2002, she moved to Milwaukee, Wisconsin with her husband Michael when he assumed the position of artistic director of the Milwaukee Ballet. Since her arrival in Milwaukee, she has served as a coach for the Milwaukee Ballet as well as a choreographer, movement director and dialect coach for local theatre companies including Milwaukee Repertory Theater and First Stage Children's Theater. She is currently the Artistic Associate at Renaissance Theaterworks, a theatre company dedicated to promoting the work of women and gender parity in the arts.

== Personal life ==
Regan Pink married Northern Ballet Theatre choreographer and associate artistic director Michael Pink in 1998. Together they have two children.

== Selected ballet roles ==
- 1988. Don Quixote. Directed by Christopher Gable, choreographed by Michael Pink.
- 1989. Lipizanner. Directed and choreographed by Gillian Lynne.
- 1989. Liaisons Amoureuses. Choreographed by Ronald Hynd.
- 1990. Giselle. Choreographed by Christopher Gable, Jean Coralli and Jules Perrot. Role: Giselle.
- 1991. Romeo and Juliet. Directed by Christopher Gable, choreographed by Massimo Moricone. Designed by Lez Brotherston. Role: Juliet.
- 1992. Swan Lake. Directed by Christopher Gable, choreographed by Michael Pink. Designed by Lez Brotherston. Role: Odette.
- 1992. A Christmas Carol. Directed by Christopher Gable, choreographed by Massimo Moricone. Designed by Lez Brotherston. Role: Belle.
- 1993. Cinderella. Directed and choreographed by Christopher Gable. Role: Cinderella.
- 1995. The Brontës. Directed and choreographed by Gillian Lynne. Designed by Lez Brotherston. Role: Charlotte Brontë
- 1996. Dracula. Directed by Christopher Gable and Michael Pink, choreographed by Michael Pink. Designed by Lez Brotherston. Role: Mina Harker.
- 1997. Giselle. Directed by Christopher Gable, choreographed by Michael Pink. Designed by Lez Brotherston. Role: Giselle.
- 1998. The Hunchback of Notre Dame. Directed by Christopher Gable, choreographed by Michael Pink. Designed by Lez Brotherston. Role: Fleur de Lys
