= Roy Freirich =

American novelist

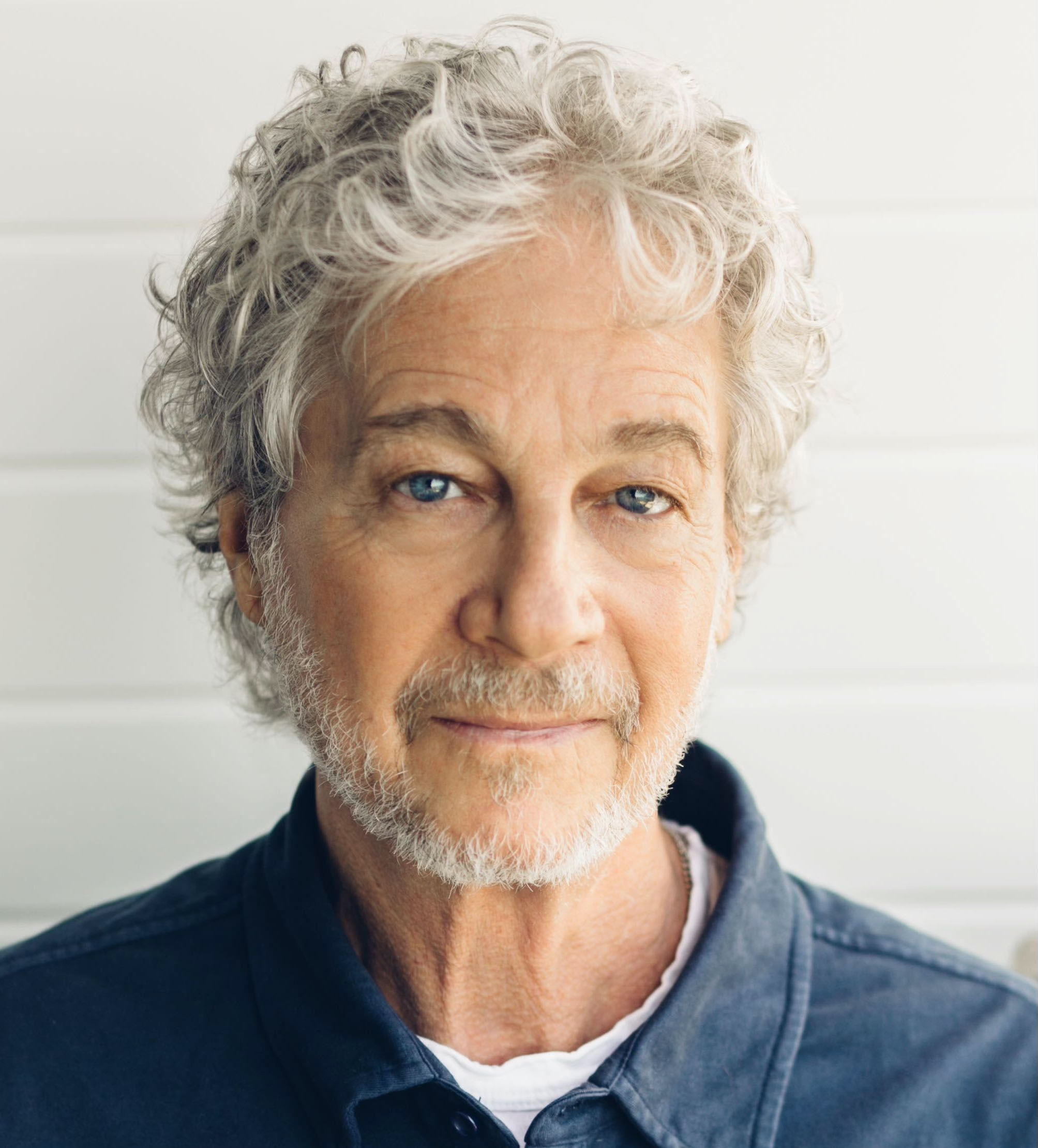
- Born: New York City, United States
- Education: Beloit College; University of Michigan
- Occupations: Screenwriter, novelist, songwriter
- Spouse: Debrah Neal (m. 1992)
- Writing career
- Period: Contemporary
- Genres: Suspense; Drama; Literary Fiction
- Website: royfreirich.com

Roy Freirich is an American screenwriter and novelist. He began his writing career as a songwriter for Warner Music Group and EMI, penning lyrics sung by Aretha Franklin and Smokey Robinson, and films such as A Goofy Movie and Top Gun. In 1983, Freirich was nominated for Best Album Or Original Score Written For A Motion Picture Or A Television Special at the 26th Annual Grammy Awards.

Freirich has also written screenplays for FOX Searchlight, Warner Bros., and DreamWorks. Freirich wrote the novel and screenplay adaptation for Winged Creatures.

== Early life ==
Freirich was born in New York City, and graduated from Beloit College in 1974. He received his Master's Degree in English Literature from the University of Michigan.

Freirich previously worked as Associate Editor for the Beloit Poetry Journal.

== Career ==
Freirich began his career as a songwriter, working with on contract with Warner Music Group and EMI. He has received numerous gold and platinum certifications, as well as a Grammy nomination in 1983 for Best Album Or Original Score Written For A Motion Picture Or A Television Special. His most recent song, Songs from a Social Distance (2023), was co-written with and performed by Teitur Lassen.

As a screenwriter, Freirich worked on projects for DreamWorks. and Fox Searchlight. He notably wrote the screenplay adaptation for the Sony film release of his novel Winged Creatures. The 2008 psychological thriller stars Forest Whitaker, Kate Beckinsale, Dakota Fanning, Josh Hutcherson, Guy Pearce, Jennifer Hudson, Jackie Earle Haley, and Jeanne Tripplehorn.

His sophomore novel, Deprivation, was released in March, 2020.

== Works ==
=== Novels ===
- Winged Creatures (St. Martin's Press, 2008)
- Deprivation (Meerkat Press, 2020)

=== Filmography ===
- Winged Creatures (Screenwriter & Producer, 2008)

=== Songwriting ===
- "This Night Won't Last Forever" (1978), performed by Bill LaBounty, Bob Dylan
- "Another Night" (1985), performed by Aretha Franklin
- "Just Another Kiss" (1990), performed by Smokey Robinson
- "Meaning of the Word" (1987), performed by Laura Branigan
- "Songs from a Social Distance" (2023), performed by Teitur Lassen

=== Film soundtracks ===
- Top Gun Soundtrack
- "Brooklyn Girls" from Donnie Brasco
- "Stand Out" & "i2i" from A Goofy Movie
- Staying Alive
- Flashdance
