= Archenault =

- Charlie Archenault
- Raphaël Archenault
