= Lillian Covillo =

American ballet dancer and choreographer

Lillian Covillo (1921 – November 22, 2010) was an American ballet dancer, and with Freidann Parker was co-founder of the professional dance company, Colorado Ballet.

== Early dance and education ==
Covillo's first exposure to dance came at age eight, when for weeks she watched ballet classes through garden-level windows at Denver's St. Philomena parochial school. On a snowy day, teacher Lucille Brush beckoned her inside, offered the use of ballet slippers, tights and a tunic, and invited her to take a class. Several years later, prior to Brush's marriage, she gave her dance studio to Covillo, who also replaced Brush as the teacher of dance and girls' basketball at Denver's Cathedral Grade School and High School.

Covillo was educated at Loretto Heights College and the University of Denver, and studied dance in Chicago with Bentley Stone and Walter Camryn, in California with Carmelita Maracci, and in Colorado with Martha Wilcox and with modern dance pioneer Hanya Holm.

== Partnership with Friedann Parker ==
While studying and performing with Martha Wilcox's modern dance group, at Denver's Lamont School of Music, Covillo met the modern dancer Freidann Parker, who was teaching at Lamont and at the University of Denver. She invited Parker to teach the younger students at the dance school she'd taken over from Lucille Brush. Covillo and Parker became partners in the school and in a series of dance companies, culminating in the founding of Colorado Ballet.

Covillo began her choreography career in 1940 and 1941, setting ballet pieces for Monsignor Joseph J. Bosetti's Denver Grand Opera Company productions of Aida and Carmen.

Parker and Covillo's first full-length ballet was their own work, The Betrothal, which sold 1,000 tickets, but lost $12,000 when performed at Denver's East High School. They continued both the dance school and their performance company, in spite of early financial losses. They also teamed to choreograph for many musicals and other stage performances at a variety of Denver area venues including the Auditorium Theatre and the Bonfils Theater.

== Colorado Concert Ballet and Colorado Ballet ==
In 1961, the Covillo-Parker Theater Ballet performed their own full-length Firebird on the same bill with George Zoritch's Under Western Skies. Zoritch, formerly a dancer with Ballet Russe de Monte Carlo, urged them to form a non-profit organization, which became Colorado Concert Ballet.

Later, American Ballet Theater veteran Fernand Nault suggested that they'd grown too large to use "concert" in their name. The company became Colorado Ballet in 1978, and was led by Covillo and Parker until it merged with Tampa Ballet in 1987. In 1981, they elevated the company's Ballet Master, William Thompson as artistic director, to be followed in 1987 by Martin Fredmann. After the 1987 merger, which lasted only three years, Covillo and Parker retired from daily operation of Colorado Ballet but continued to be involved in its artistic guidance as it became one of America's major regional ballet companies.

Asked in a 2003 interview what had made Colorado Ballet successful, Covillo said, "It was just staying power. Just being in there and through thick, through thin, through heaven and hell. We did it anyway. People said, 'What did you do for a social life?' We both looked at each other, Social life? We rehearsed a lot. We ate hamburgers afterwards. That was really it, to have the desire to have it be what it is today." She added, "Now, we're not responsible for what it is today."

== Death ==
Freidann Parker died in 2002. Lillian Covillo lived with macular degeneration in her last years, but continued to watch dance performances from the center of the front row. She died November 22, 2010, one month after being feted at Colorado Ballet's fiftieth anniversary celebration.
