= The Singer (Teitur Lassen album) =

Studio album by Teitur
- Released: February 2008
- Recorded: 2007
- Genres: Pop-rock, chamber pop
- Labels: Arlo & Betty Records
- Producer: Teitur

Teitur chronology
Stay Under the Stars (2006)	The Singer (2008)

Professional ratings
Review scores
Source	Rating
AllMusic	2.5/5 stars
Soundmag.de	6/10 stars
The Guardian	5/5 stars
The Independent	5/5 stars

The Singer is the third major English-language album by Teitur Lassen, released worldwide in early 2008 on the independent labels Cheap Lullaby and Playground Music. It was recorded on the Swedish island of Gotland. Upon its release, the album reached the top 10 in Denmark and has received favorable reviews worldwide.

== Track listing ==
1. "The Singer" (Lassen) - 3:31
2. "Your Great Book" (Lassen) - 4:17
3. "The Girl I Don't Know" (Cohen, Lassen) - 4:13
4. "We Still Drink the Same Water" (Lassen) - 4:58
5. "Catherine the Waitress" (Lassen) - 3:58
6. "Legendary Afterparty" (Lassen) - 5:59
7. "Guilt by Association" (Bak, Lassen) - 5:44
8. "Start Wasting My Time" (Kershaw, Lassen) - 5:03
9. "Letter from Alex" (Ejsmont, Lassen) - 4:29
10. "Don't Let Me Fall in Love with You" (Hewerdine, Lassen) - 5:15
11. "You Should Have Seen Us" (Cohen, Lassen) - 4:46
