= Harsent =

Harsent is a surname. Notable people with the surname include:

- David Harsent (born 1942), English poet
- Rose Harsent (died 1902), English murder victim
- Simon Harsent (born 1965), English fine art and commercial photographer, son of David
