= Ryan Martin (ballet) =

American ballet dancer

- Born: Ryan B. Martin; July 28, 1973 (age 51); Alameda, California
- Occupation(s): Ballet dancer, ballet teacher, artistic director

Ryan Martin (born June 28, 1973, in Alameda, California) is an American ballet dancer, ballet teacher and artistic director. He was the first American male to study at the Vaganova Academy in St. Petersburg, Russia, and the first male American student to receive a scholarship to train there.

== Career ==
After graduating from the Vaganova Academy, Martin danced with the Yacobsen Ballet/Choreographic Miniatures in St. Petersburg Russia. He danced with the Semper Opera Ballet in Dresden, Germany for five years. He was a principal dancer with the Tulsa Ballet, and Milwaukee Ballet. He retired from the Milwaukee Ballet in 2015.

Ryan Martin currently teaches and choreographs. He received his teaching certification from Janet L. Springer, a ballet pedagogue and executive director of Classical Dance Alliance.

== Early life ==
In his early years, Ryan Martin received his ballet training at Old Dominion University Ballet under Istvan Ament. As a teen, he studied with the National Ballet School in Toronto, Canada, before attending the Vaganova Academy.

Martin graduated from the Vaganova Academy in 1993.
