= Michael Pink =

British choreographer, director, dancer, and theatre producer

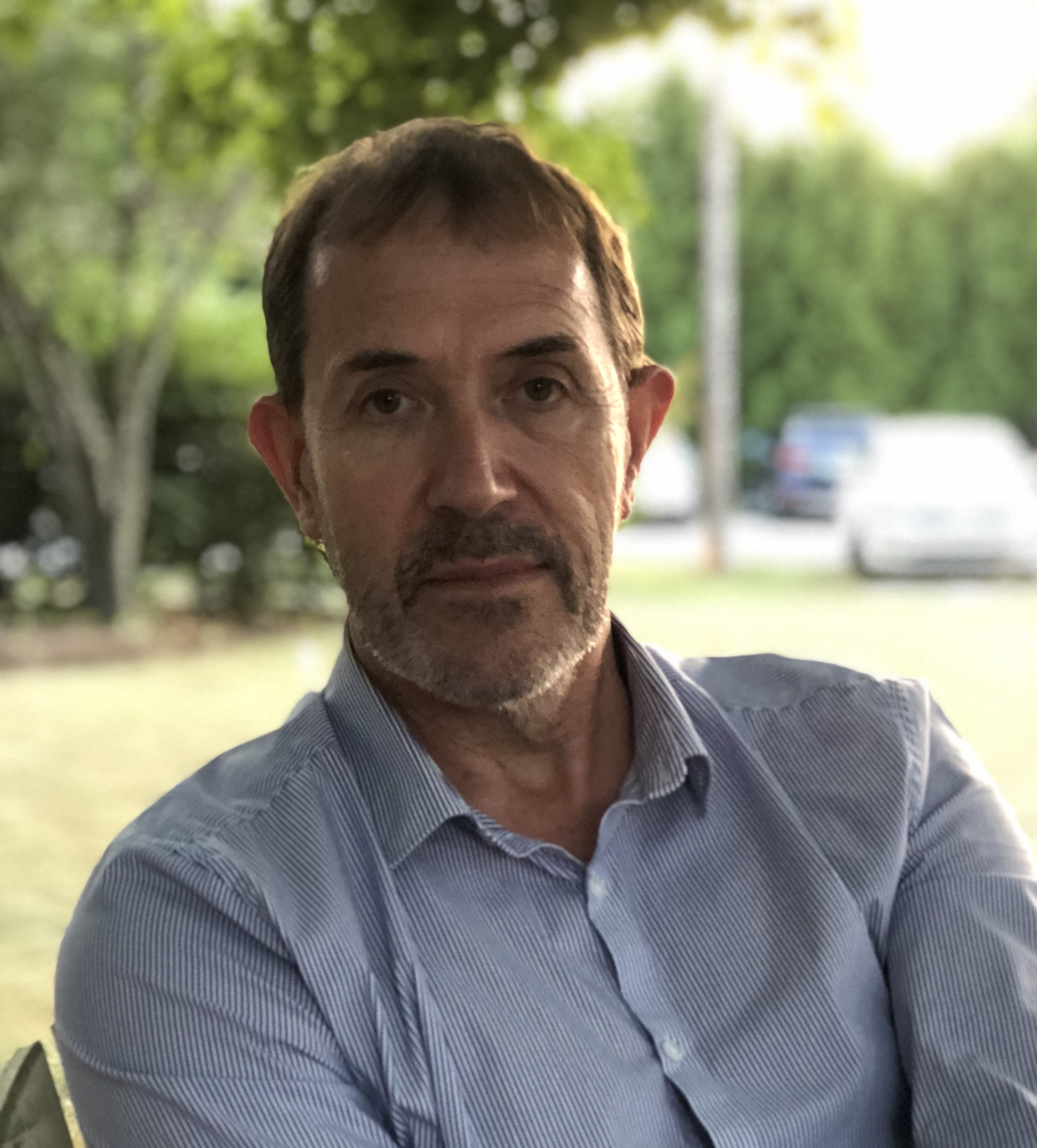
- Pink in 2018
- Born: 18 November 1956 (age 70); York, England
- Occupations: Choreographer, director, dancer
- Years active: 1975–present
- Spouse: Jayne Regan Pink (m. 1998)
- Children: 3; Max Christian Pink; Georgina Elizabeth Pink; Dr. Chloë Barrett-Pink
- Awards: Royal Society of Arts Choreographic Award, among others (see below)
- Website: http://www.michaelpinkchoreographer.com

Michael Pink (born 18 November 1956) is a British choreographer, director, dancer, and theatre producer whose works and style have been referred to as "classical ballet for the 21st century." His trademark narrative works have been presented throughout America, New Zealand, Australia, Norway and Japan. Pink began his professional career as a dancer with the London Festival Ballet (now the English National Ballet). After retiring from the stage, Pink went on to choreograph, direct, and teach internationally. He was the Associate Artistic Director of the UK's Northern Ballet Theatre (1993-1998), working closely with friend and mentor Christopher Gable, CBE. Pink felt Gable gave him the confidence to be true to himself as an artist. Together, they formed a close collaborative team with composer Philip Feeney and designer Lez Brotherston, creating landmark original ballets. Pink was also co-founder of Ballet Central, the graduate performing company of the Central School of Ballet, where both he and Feeney created 16 original works. He is currently the Artistic Director of the Milwaukee Ballet, and is the longest-serving Artistic Director in the company's history.

== Early life ==
Michael Pink was born in York, England in 1956. His parents worked most of their lives for the chocolate company Rowntree Mackintosh. Music played an important role in his childhood and he was head chorister at St. Olave's Church. This was the same church in which he married ballerina Jayne Regan in 1998. Pink's mother, father, and brothers were members of the York Amateur Opera and Dramatic Society, and Pink's first role was in Macbeth at the York Theatre Royal. His younger brother Gregory was a theatre electrician who went on to become a sound designer, and his older brother Anthony was a trustee banker and treasurer for the society. Theatre was very much a family affair. He returned in 1975 to choreograph The Englishman Amused, a musical revue, for York Theatre Royal, directed by Jimmy Thompson.

== Career ==
=== Training ===
Pink trained at the Royal Ballet School in London. His passion for dance, and choreography in particular, earned him accolades, including winning the first Ursula Moreton Choreographic Competition. Whilst still a student at RBS he was invited by Sir Frederick Ashton to assist in choreographing the Anacat Fashion Show for HRH Princess Margaret. Upon graduation he attended the inaugural GulbenkianChoreographic Summer Program, led by Glen Tetley, Mary Hicks, and Dame Peggy van Praagh.

=== London Festival Ballet ===
In 1975, Pink joined the London Festival Ballet, under the directorship of Dame Beryl Grey. He quickly gained a reputation as an excellent partner, and danced many leading roles with ballerinas; Patricia Ruanne, Eva Evdokimova, Elisabetta Terabust, Lynn Seymour, and most noticeably, Natalia Makarova in John Cranko's Onegin. Pink performed in works by Massine, Tetley, Bruce, Hynd, Tudor, Ashton, and Beriosova. His first choreographic work for the company, 1914, was nominated for a West End Theatre Award. He was also a recipient of the Royal Society of Arts Choreographic Award. During this time, Pink also became close friends with Rudolf Nureyev, serving as his répétiteur for his production of "Romeo and Juliet" at both Paris Opera and La Scala Milan. Pink states that this formative time with Nureyev taught him the necessity of finding a balance between work and life, saying "he gave me the confidence to be true to myself as a creative artist."

=== Northern Ballet Theatre ===
Pink was first commissioned in 1982 by the Arts Council of Great Britain and Northern Ballet Theatre to create Attractions, in collaboration with composer Michael Berkley. His 1987 production of Memoire Imaginaire was filmed for HTV International's "Time to Dance". In 1988 he choreographed his first full length production, The Amazing Adventures of Don Quixote. In 1989 he created Strange Meeting, a one act ballet based on the poems of Wilfred Owen, with music by Philip Feeney and design by Lez Brotherston. Pink joined NBT as associate artistic director in 1993, where he remained until 1998. During this time he created The Hunchback of Notre Dame, Swan Lake, Giselle, and his most popular and critically acclaimed ballet, Dracula.

=== Milwaukee Ballet ===
Pink assumed the role of Artistic Director of the Milwaukee Ballet in December 2002. In his time as AD he has successfully nurtured partnerships with other arts groups and educational institutions including UW-Milwaukee and the Medical College of Wisconsin. Under his direction, the Milwaukee Ballet school and MBII program gained accreditation from the National Association of Dance; both are now attracting dancers from around the world. Romeo and Juliet was broadcast by MPTV in 2007. In 2013 his acclaimed production of Peter Pan was screened nationally on PBS's "Great Performances". He has continued to create original work for Milwaukee Ballet with his longtime collaborator Philip Feeney, and lighting designer David Grill.

== Personal life ==
Pink married Northern Ballet Theatre principal artist Jayne Regan in 1998. Together they have two children, Max Christian Pink and Georgina Elizabeth Pink. Pink also has a daughter from a previous marriage, Dr. Chloë Barrett-Pink.

== Selected choreographic works ==
=== For London Festival Ballet ===
- 1914 (1980)
- Ibertissment (1981)
- The Waltz in John Field's Swan Lake (1982)

=== For Northern Ballet Theatre ===
- Attractions (1982)
- Memoire Imaginaire (1987)
- The Amazing Adventures of Don Quixote (1988)
- Strange Meeting (1989)
- Swan Lake (1994)
- Dracula (1996)
- Giselle (1997)
- The Hunchback of Notre Dame (1998)

=== For Atlanta Ballet ===
- Romeo & Juliet (2000)

=== For Milwaukee Ballet ===
- The Nutcracker (2003)
- Solstice (2004)
- Swan Lake (2006)
- Aubade (2008)
- Sleeping Beauty (2008)
- Cinderella (2009)
- Peter Pan (2010)
- La Bohème (2012)
- Mirror Mirror (2014)
- Dorian Gray (2016)
- Beauty and the Beast (2018)
- Nutcracker Drosselmeyer's Imaginarium (2024)

=== For the Milwaukee Repertory Theater ===
- Cabaret
- Assassins
- Next to Normal
- A Christmas Carol

== Honors ==
- 1978 Royal Society of Arts Choreographic Award
- 2008 Wisconsin Dance Council Choreography/Performance Award
- 2014 Milwaukee Press Club Headliner Award-Lifetime Achievement
- 2015 Civic Music Milwaukee Distinguished Citizen – Professional in the Arts Award
- 2019 Sharon Lynne Wilson Center Educational Excellence Award
