= Stay Under the Stars =

Studio album by Teitur
- Released: May 5, 2006
- Recorded: 2005–2006
- Genre: Pop rock
- Label: Arlo & Betty Records
- Producers: Martin Terefe and Teitur

Teitur chronology
Poetry & Aeroplanes (2003)	Stay Under the Stars (2006)

Professional ratings
Review scores
Source	Rating
AllMusic	link
Musiq.no	link
Soundvenue.com	5/6 link

Stay Under The Stars is the second album by Teitur Lassen, released in Scandinavia in May 2006, and in the rest of the world in September 2006. It was recorded in London at Kensaltown Studios and produced by Martin Terefe (Ron Sexsmith, KT Tunstall, Jason Mraz).

Following his departure from Universal Music, Teitur founded Arlo & Betty Records for this album and licensed the album to Scandinavia's Playground Music and North America's Equator Records. The album reached the top 10 in Denmark and has received favorable reviews worldwide. The song All My Mistakes appears on the CD release Songs for Tibet, also featuring Alanis Morissette, Sting, Dave Matthews, Damien Rice and Imogen Heap.

== Track listing ==
1. "Don't Want You to Wake Up" (Jeff Cohen, Teitur Lassen) - 5:12
2. "Louis, Louis" (Teitur Lassen) - 4:32
3. "You Get Me" (Teitur Lassen, Pamela Sheyne) - 4:56
4. "I Run the Carousel" (Teitur Lassen) - 4:41
5. "Thief about to Break In" (Teitur Lassen) - 3:14
6. "Great Balls of Fire" (Otis Blackwell, Jack Hammer) - 3:58
7. "Night Time Works" (Teitur Lassen) - 1:29
8. "Umbrellas in the Rain" (Teitur Lassen) - 2:45
9. "Boy, She Can Sing" (Teitur Lassen, Ken Rose) - 3:38
10. "Hitchhiker" (Alex Ejsmont, Teitur Lassen) - 3:46
11. "Waiting for Mars" (Teitur Lassen) - 2:35
12. "All my Mistakes" (Jeff Cohen, Alex Ejsmont, Teitur Lassen) - 7:33
