= Michael Smuin =

- Born: October 13, 1938; Missoula, Montana, US
- Died: April 23, 2007 (aged 68); San Francisco, California, US
- Occupations: Choreographer, dancer
- Years active: 1970s-2007
- Spouse: Paula Tracy (1961–2000)

Michael Smuin (October 13, 1938 – April 23, 2007) was an American ballet dancer, choreographer and theatre director. He was co-founder and director of his own dance company, the Smuin Ballet in San Francisco.

== Biography ==
Born in Missoula, Montana, Smuin was a principal dancer with the American Ballet Theatre and the San Francisco Ballet, for which he served as co-artistic director from 1973 through 1985. In 1994 he founded Smuin Ballet. He also choreographed for the Dance Theatre of Harlem, Washington Ballet, Pacific Northwest Ballet, and Milwaukee Ballet.

Smuin's Broadway credits included Little Me (1962) as a dancer, Anything Goes (1987) as a choreographer, and Sophisticated Ladies (1981) and Shogun: The Musical (1990) as choreographer and director. He also choreographed the 1995 West End production of Mack and Mabel.

Smuin's film credits included The Fantasticks, A Walk in the Clouds, The Joy Luck Club, The Cotton Club, and Rumble Fish.

Smuin collapsed and died of a heart attack while teaching company class in San Francisco.

== Awards and nominations ==
Awards

- 1984 Emmy Award for Outstanding Achievement in Choreography – Great Performances: Dance in America
- 1988 Tony Award for Best Choreography – Anything Goes
- 1988 Drama Desk Award for Outstanding Choreography – Anything Goes

Nominations

- 1981 Tony Award for Best Choreography – Sophisticated Ladies
- 1981 Tony Award for Best Direction of a Musical – Sophisticated Ladies
- 1981 Emmy Award for Outstanding Achievement in Choreography – Great Performances: Dance in America
