= Carmina Burana (disambiguation) =

Carmina Burana is a medieval manuscript of poems and dramatic texts.

Carmina Burana may also refer to:

- Carmina Burana (Orff), a 1935–1936 musical composition by Carl Orff based on some of the poems
- Carmina Burana (album), a recording of the Orff piece by Ray Manzarek
