= Fernand Nault =

Canadian ballet dancer and choreographer

Fernand Nault, OC, CQ (27 December 1920 – 26 December 2006) was a Canadian dancer and choreographer.

== Early life and career ==
He was born Fernand-Noël Boissonneault in Montreal. After he abandoned his original career intent of becoming a priest, he studied dance with Maurice Morenoff in Montreal and later with prominent teachers in New York City, London, and Paris.

In 1944, Nault was hired by the American Ballet Theatre at an audition in Montreal to replace an injured dancer. He went on to become a distinguished character dancer, ballet master with the company, and later director of the company's school. After twenty-one years with the company, he returned to Montreal in 1965 and accepted the invitation of Ludmilla Chiriaeff to become co-artistic director and resident choreographer of Les Grands Ballets Canadiens.

== Working in Canada ==
Nault's best-known work is probably his spectacular production of Casse-Noisette (The Nutcracker), which has been performed annually during the Christmas season in Montreal for many years.

Other major works include Carmina Burana, created in 1962 and given a new production in 1966 by Les Grands Ballets Canadiens for the company's season during Expo 67, and the hugely successful rock ballet Tommy, created in 1970 and based on the rock opera by The Who.

Nault was also choreographer and ballet master for the École Supérieure de Danse du Québec, the school established by Madame Chiriaeff in 1966. He remained active with Les Grands Ballets Canadiens for many years and in 1990 was named choreographer emeritus, a title he held until his death.

== Working in the United States ==
Besides his work for Canadian companies, he was also guest choreographer for several troupes in the United States, including the Denver Civic Ballet, the Atlanta Ballet, and the Colorado Ballet, for which he also served for a time as artistic director.

== Honors and death ==
Nault was made an Officer of the Order of Canada in 1977 and a Chevalier de l'Ordre National du Québec in 1990. In 2000, Nault received a Governor General's Performing Arts Award for Lifetime Artistic Achievement, Canada's foremost honour in the performing arts. He died in Montreal the day before his 86th birthday after a long battle with Parkinson's disease.
