= Winged Creatures (film) =

- Theatrical release poster
- Directed by: Rowan Woods
- Written by: Roy Freirich
- Based on: Winged Creatures by Roy Freirich
- Produced by: Robert Salerno
- Starring: Kate Beckinsale; Dakota Fanning; Guy Pearce; Forest Whitaker; Jennifer Hudson; Jackie Earle Haley; Josh Hutcherson
- Cinematography: Eric Alan Edwards
- Edited by: Meg Reticker
- Music by: Marcelo Zarvos
- Production company: Peace Arch Entertainment
- Distributed by: Sony Pictures Worldwide Acquisitions Group
- Release dates: June 24, 2008 (Los Angeles Film Festival); July 31, 2009 (United States)
- Running time: 100 minutes
- Country: United States
- Language: English
- Box office: $39,171 (Foreign)

Winged Creatures (released as Fragments on DVD) is a 2008 psychological drama directed by Rowan Woods and starring Kate Beckinsale, Dakota Fanning, Josh Hutcherson, Guy Pearce, Forest Whitaker, Jennifer Hudson, Jackie Earle Haley, Jeanne Tripplehorn and Embeth Davidtz. It is an adaptation of Roy Freirich's novel Winged Creatures. It was released on DVD by Sony Pictures Worldwide Acquisitions Group in the United States on August 4, 2009, as Fragments.

== Plot ==
While in a restaurant, Carla Davenport, the restaurant cashier; Charlie Archenault, a driving-school teacher; Bruce Laraby, an emergency room physician; Anne Hagen; her father; and her best friend, Jimmy Jasperson, suddenly hear gunshots. Anne and Jimmy retreat under a table as a suicidal gunman shoots several people (including Anne's father) and then himself. The film shows the aftermath as these five traumatized people struggle to regain their trust in the ordinary world.

== Cast ==
- Kate Beckinsale as Carla Davenport
- Dakota Fanning as Anne Hagen
- Josh Hutcherson as Jimmy Jasperson
- Forest Whitaker as Charlie Archenault
- Guy Pearce as Dr. Bruce Laraby
- Jeanne Tripplehorn as Doris Hagen
- Jennifer Hudson as Kathy Archenault
- Jackie Earle Haley as Bob Jasperson
- Walton Goggins as Zack
- Embeth Davidtz as Jo Laraby
- Troy Garity as Ron Alber
- Robin Weigert as Lydia Jasperson
- Andrew Fiscella as Numbers Man
- Jaimz Woolvett as the Swedish Cook
- Hayley McFarland as Lori Carline
- Soren Fulton as Howard

== Reception ==
On the review aggregator website Rotten Tomatoes, 45% of 31 critics' reviews are positive. The website's consensus reads: "Sensitive but not insightful, Fragments pieces an ensemble together in the same way Crash did but without the gravitas."
