= Simon Harsent =

Simon Harsent is a fine art and commercial photographer. The eldest son of British poet David Harsent, he was born in Aylesbury, England in 1965, and lives in New York and Australia. Harsent's work has been exhibited in galleries and museums worldwide.

== Early life and career ==
He first studied photography at the Grange Secondary School in Aylesbury. After continuing his studies at Watford college, England, Simon moved to London and eventually to Australia, where he established himself as a leading commercial photographer. In 2000, he moved to New York City where he has continued his commercial career as well as concentrating on fine art work. He is co-founder of the POOL photography collective who, in 2011, published their debut publication, Blow Up. In 2009, he published his first monograph, Melt: Portrait of an Iceberg which has been shown in The Australian Center of Photography, Oliver Gordon Galley in Toronto Canada, The Saatchi and Saatchi Gallery Sydney and The Alison Milne Gallery, Toronto Canada. Harsent's work is included in the permanent collection at both the Queensland Art Gallery and The Powerhouse Museum.

== Exhibitions ==
=== Selected solo exhibitions ===
- 2012 Melt: The Alison Milne Gallery in Toronto Canada
- 2012 Into the Abyss: The Sydney Opera House, Sydney, Australia
- 2010 Melt: The Saatchi Gallery Sydney, Sydney, Australia
- 2009 Melt: The Australian Center for Photography, Sydney, Australia
- 2009 Melt: Oliver Gordon Gallery, Toronto, Canada
- 2001 Untitled Nudes, Sandra Bryon Gallery, Sydney, Australia

=== Selected group exhibitions ===
- 2012 National Portrait Award, National Portrait Gallery, Canberra, Australia
- 2012 Blow Up at the Hazlehurst Regional Gallery, NSW, Australia
- 2011 Blow Up Fleet Steps Sydney Botanical Gardens, Sydney, Australia
- 2009 Px3 Essence of Water Espace Dupon Paris, France
- 2009 Px3 Essence of Water Farmani Gallery, New York, USA
- 2008 Gallery SAND, Amsterdam, Netherlands
- 2008 The Big Picture, Oliver Gordon Gallery, Toronto, Canada
- 2008 IPA Award Best in Show Traveling Exhibition
- 2007 IPA Award Best in Show Traveling Exhibition
- 2006 The Female Form, Bryon McMahon Gallery, Sydney, Australia
- 2006 Olive Cotton Award, Tweed River Art Gallery, Australia
- 1989 Street Kids, Town Hall, Sydney, Australia

== Selected awards ==
- 2012 Australian National Portrait Award Finalist
- 2012 Archive 200 Best advertising photographers
- 2012 D&AD in Book Award for Blow Up
- 2012 PDN Photo annual for Schweppes
- 2012 Art Directors Club of NY Bronze Award Schweppes
- 2012 Art Directors Club of NY Silver Award The Ship song
- 2012 AWARD Awards Bronze award for The Ship Song Project
- 2012 Communication Arts Photography Annual
- 2011 D&AD In Book Award for WWF
- 2010 IPA awards 2nd Place Advertising
- 2010 IPA awards 1st Place Nature
- 2010 Caxton Awards Best use of Photography for Leo Burnett Advertising
- 2010 Archives 200 Best Photographers
- 2010 D&AD In Book Award Melt Portrait of an Iceberg
- 2010 D&AD In Book Award WWF Ghosts Campaign
- 2010 Australian Creative's Hotshop Photographer of the year
- 2010 PND Photo Annual Awarded Books Melt Portrait of an Iceberg
- 2010 PDN Photo annual Awarded Advertising WWF Ghosts Campaign
- 2009 AWARD Awards Silver Award WWF Ghosts Campaign
- 2009 AWARD Awards Silver Award WWF Ghosts Penguins
- 2009 AWARD Awards Bronze Award WWF Ghosts Gorilla
- 2009 AWARD Awards Bronze Award WWF Ghosts Tigers
- 2009 AWARD Awards Bronze Award WWF Ghosts Eagle
