= Smuin Ballet =

Touring ballet company based in San Francisco

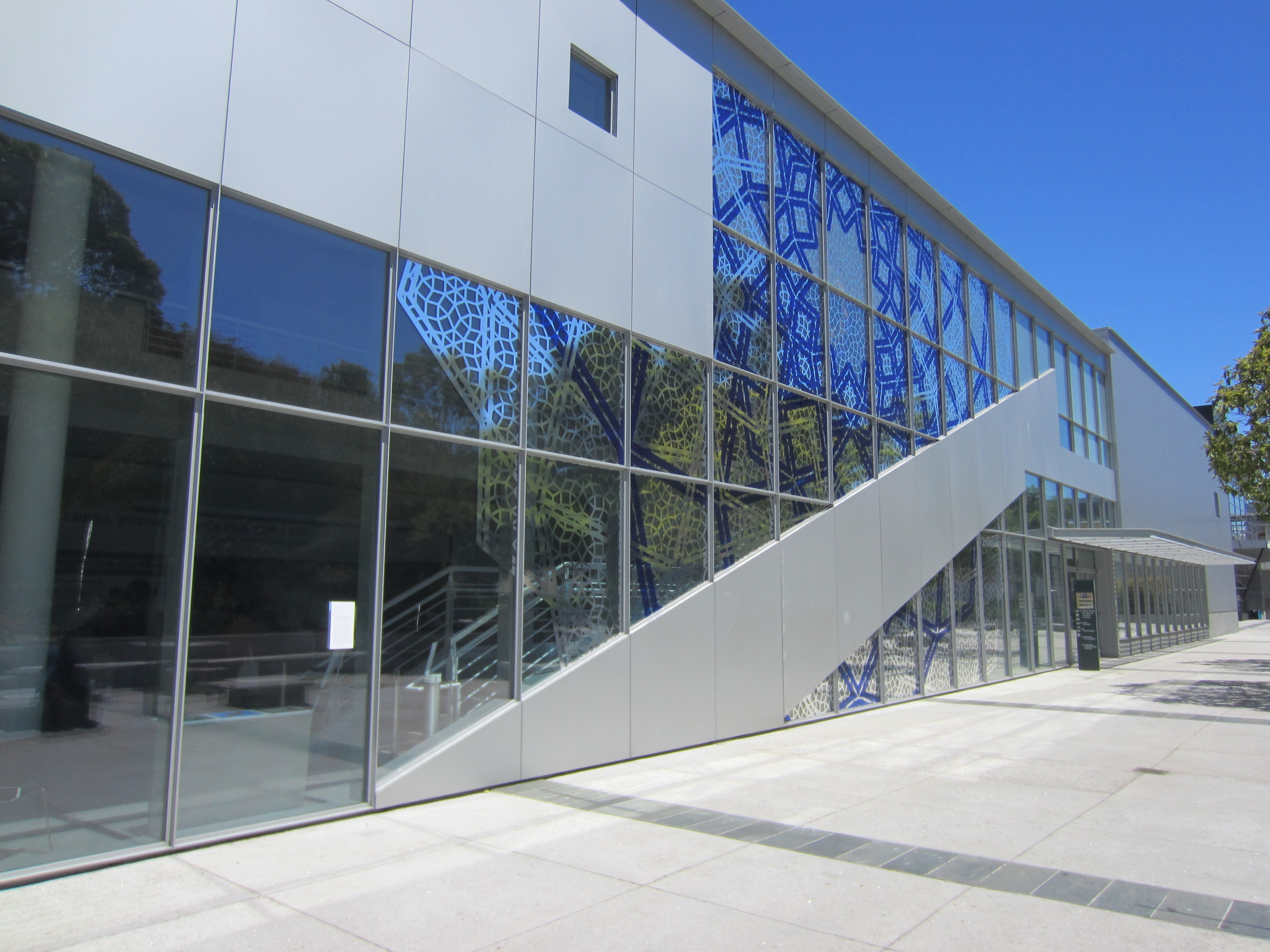
Yerba Buena Center for the Arts, San Francisco (2013)

Smuin Contemporary Ballet, formerly known as Smuin Ballet, is a touring ballet company based in San Francisco, California. Smuin Ballet performs its season in multiple venues: the Dean Lesher Center in Walnut Creek, the Mountain View Center for the Performing Arts in Mountain View, the Sunset Center in Carmel, the Yerba Buena Center for the Arts and The Palace of Fine Arts Theater in San Francisco.

== History ==
=== Founding ===
Michael Smuin, a former dancer, choreographer and co-artistic director with the San Francisco Ballet and an award-winning choreographer, founded Smuin Contemporary Ballet in 1994.

Then known as Smuin Ballet, the "American ballet company with a distinctly American accent… infused ballet with the rhythm, speed, and syncopation of American popular culture.” Michael Smuin created about 40 ballets for the Smuin Ballet company. After his sudden passing in 2007, Smuin's longtime “muse and mainstay,” Celia Fushille, was named Artistic Director of Smuin. As a founding member of the company, Fushille created roles in some of Michael Smuin's most memorable ballets, from the romantic Roxane in Cyrano to the lusty Lola-Lola in The Blue Angel. In addition to maintaining Michael Smuin’s legacy, as Artistic Director, she commissioned more than 20 premieres and added the work of 15 choreographers new to the Smuin audience. From 2008-2014, Fushille also served as Executive Director of the Company.

== Company ==
=== Artistic Director ===
- Amy Seiwert

=== Rehearsal Director ===
- Amy London

=== Rehearsal Assistant ===
- Benjamin Warner

=== Company Artists ===
- AL Abraham
- Tessa Barbour
- Dominic Barrett
- Isabel Borges
- Jacopo Calvo
- Maggie Carey
- Cameron Cofrancesco
- Gabrielle Collins
- Ricardo Dyer
- Cassidy Isaacson
- Tess Lane
- Marc LaPierre
- Shania Rasmussen
- Yuri Rogers
- João Sampaio
- Brennan Wall

== Touring and performing ==
Smuin performs over 60 shows per season in theaters throughout San Francisco, Walnut Creek, Mountain View, and Carmel. Based in the San Francisco Bay Area, Smuin also tours across the country to venues including the Joyce Theater in New York; Montana, Michael Smuin's home state; southern California; Colorado; and Alaska, as well as throughout Europe and Australia.

Smuin has launched over 50 new works into the American dance repertoire, including many choreographed by Michael Smuin, as well as over 10 ballets created by Amy Seiwert, Smuin's Choreographer in Residence. Many notable choreographers such as Trey McIntyre, Helen Pickett, Ma Cong, Adam Houghland, and Val Caniparoli have premiered works with Smuin. Many of the choreographers have also given Smuin the opportunity to perform their works, including Jiří Kylián, Annabelle Lopez Ochoa, Matthew Neenan, and more.

== Recognitions ==
In February 2023, Dance Data Project announced the results from its first Gender Equity Index for the 50 largest U.S. ballet companies. Smuin Ballet was ranked "Best of Leadership" and “Exceptional.”
