= Winged Creatures (novel) =

2008 novel by Roy Freirich

- First edition
- Author: Roy Freirich
- Cover artist: Jeanette Levy (design)
- Language: English
- Genre: Drama
- Published: January 2008 St. Martin's Griffin
- Publication place: United States
- Pages: 295

Winged Creatures is a drama novel written by Roy Freirich. Rowan Woods has directed a film based on the book.

== Main characters ==
=== Bruce Laraby ===
Laraby was in Carby's Restaurant twenty minutes before the shooting, as he soon finds out. While operating on one of the victims, he accidentally nicks the aorta with the scalpel, causing the victim to bleed to death. Riddled with guilt, Laraby sneaks migraine-inducing medicine into his wife's food so he can "save" her each time. She ends up almost dying from overdose to these drugs where he rushes to save her. In the film Laraby is played by Guy Pearce.

=== Charlie Archenault ===
Charlie was grazed by a stray bullet as a result of the shooting, and survives. The doctors tell him he is some kind of lucky not to have been killed. A dazed Charlie walks out of the hospital, clinging onto the word "lucky". It is for this reason he begins to gamble incessantly, thinking his luck will work for him at the casino. In the film, Charlie is played by Forest Whitaker.

=== Carla Davenport ===
Carla is the cashier at Carby's when the shooting happens. She is unharmed, but it has a definite effect on her. She loses her ability to take care of herself and her infant son. She turns to alcohol and men to make herself feel better. Carla is also noted to have a crush on Laraby. In the film, Carla is played by Kate Beckinsale.

=== Anne Hagen ===
Anne's father was killed in the shooting, which Anne and her best friend Jimmy witnessed. Anne appears unwilling or unable to accept her father's death, and instead becomes infatuated with religion, in addition to becoming spacy and distant. In the film, Anne is played by Dakota Fanning.

=== Jimmy Jaspersen ===
Jimmy was with Anne when her father was shot, and it troubles him as much as anyone else. In response, he emotionally shuts down, refusing to speak or show any sort emotion whatsoever. He is noted to be secretly in love with Anne, as the book mentions that he looks at her when she isn't looking. Only Jimmy affectionately calls her "Annie" and is goofy around her because he loves the sound of her laughing. Tortured by their secret, Jimmy attempts suicide twice, with Anne there to stop him both times. In the film, Jimmy is played by Josh Hutcherson.

== Minor characters ==
=== Ron Abler ===
Abler is a psychologist, who repeatedly attempts to get through to Carla, Jimmy, and Anne. Carla is suspicious of him and deletes all the messages he sends her. Anne continually spurns his advances and seems to hate him especially. Jimmy is shielded from talking mostly by his father, who blames psychologists for the death of his other son, Michael. The one time Abler is not sent away by Mr. Jaspersen, Jimmy runs away and attempts to jump off of the bridge. The only reason he doesn't jump is because Anne was there to talk him out of it by threatening to reveal their secret.

=== Doris Hagen ===
Anne's mother is just as grief-stricken as Anne, but she is confused as to why Anne shows no grief following her father's death. Anne resists Doris too until the scene of Jimmy's second suicide attempt, in which she is forced to tell Jimmy's and her secret. In the film, Doris is played by Jeanne Tripplehorn.

=== Lydia Jaspersen ===
Jimmy's mother seems just as trapped and sad as Jimmy does, which is perhaps why he only shows emotional reaction to her and Anne. Lydia does not understand Jimmy's failure to speak either, but she is the only one besides Anne who doesn't pry. For that, Jimmy reacts to his mother's sorrow, occasionally comforting her. In the film, Lydia is played by Robin Weigert.

=== Bob Jaspersen ===
Jimmy's father is self-pitying and selfish, and doesn't pry very much either, but simply because of his belief that if you ignore a problem, it will just go away. He physically abuses Jimmy's mother, which causes Jimmy to attempt suicide a second time. Bob eventually moves out, and Jimmy and Lydia know they are better off. In the film, Bob is played by Jackie Earle Haley.

=== Kathy Archenault ===
Charlie's wife is stunned to find that Charlie has left the hospital and is even more shocked when their life savings begins to dwindle away due to Charlie's excessive gambling. In the film, Kathy is played by Jennifer Hudson, and she is Charlie's daughter instead of his wife.

=== Lori and Sue Carline ===
Their father was killed in the shooting and both Lori and Sue look to Anne for guidance. Anne is quite aware that they are doing this purely because no one else would understand.

=== Howard ===
Howard is a popular boy at Jimmy and Anne's high school. Anne has a crush on him (to which Jimmy is visibly jealous) until she goes to a party and realizes he just wanted to have his way with her. She is almost submissive with this until Howard's grip on her hand reminds her of the day her father was shot. She runs home, whimpering, and smashes all of the pigeon cages her father kept without really knowing what she's doing.

== Publication history ==
Winged Creatures was published by St. Martin's Press on January 1, 2008.

== Reception ==
The novel received mixed reception upon its release. Kirkus Reviews complimented the novel's pacing and ending, while Publishers Weekly criticized the dialogue and prose.
