= Milwaukee Ballet =

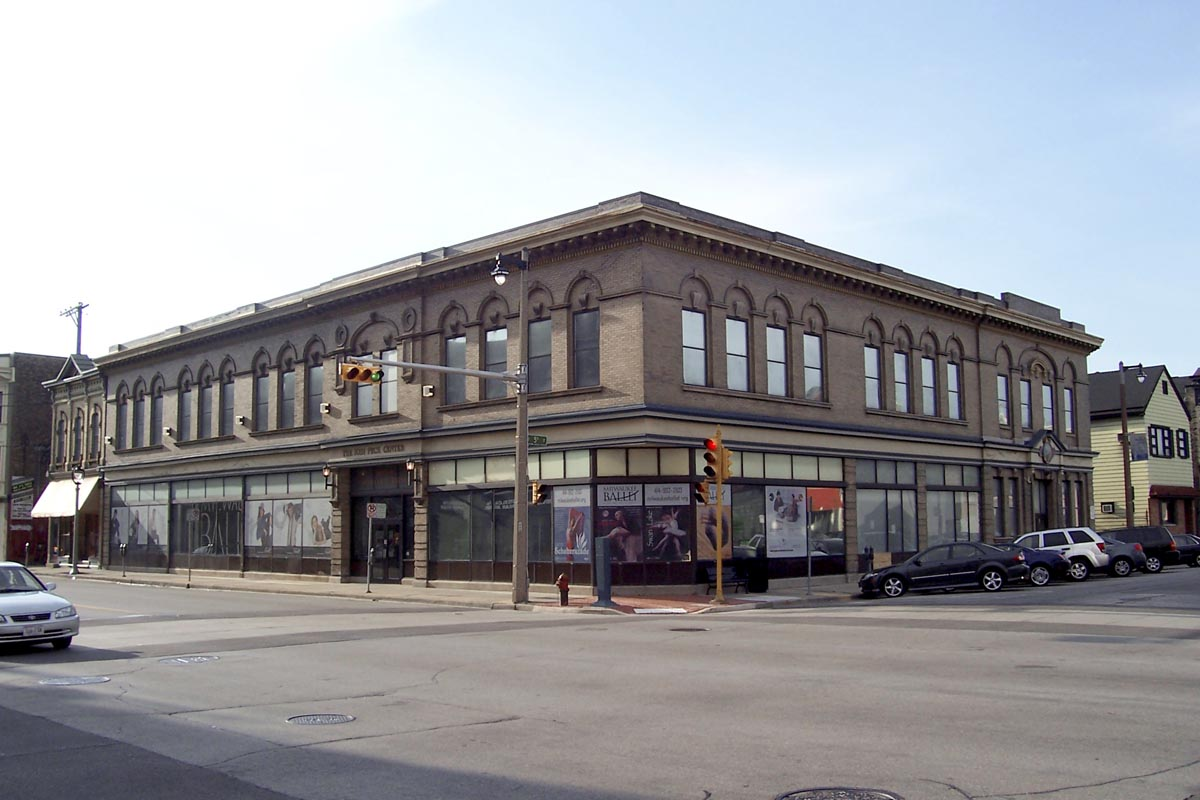

General information
- Name: Milwaukee Ballet
- Year founded: 1969
- Founders: Roberta Boorse
- Website: www.milwaukeeballet.org

Other
- Official school: Milwaukee Ballet School
- Formation: Leading Artists; Artists

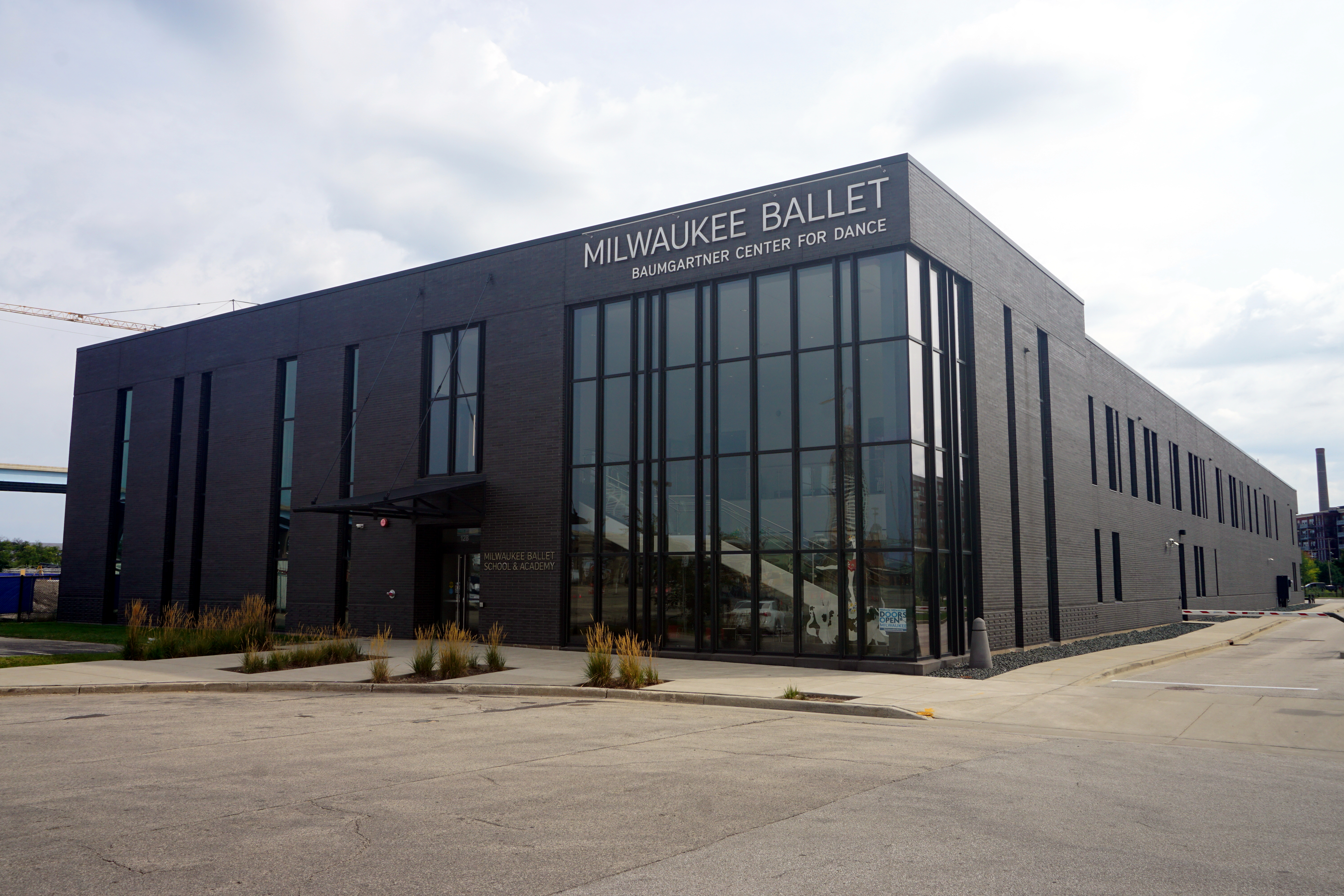
The Baumgartner Center for Dance became the Milwaukee Ballet's home in 2019, when the company marked its 50th anniversary.

The Milwaukee Ballet is a professional ballet company founded by Roberta Boorse of Milwaukee, Wisconsin, United States. It is located in Milwaukee, and is currently run by Michael Pink, the artistic director.

== History ==
The Milwaukee Ballet was founded in 1969, and held its first performance on April 24, 1970 at the School of Fine Arts at the University of Wisconsin–Milwaukee. Less than a year later the company began performing in Uihlein Hall at the Marcus Center for the Performing Arts, where it still performs today.

Milwaukee Ballet's Studio was located at the Jodi Peck Center until Fall 2019 until the opening of their new studio, the Baumgartner Center for Dance. The Baumgatner Center for Dance is a new 52,000-foot, state-of-the-art facility in Milwaukee's Third Ward.

In 1975 the Milwaukee Ballet opened an affiliated school, the Milwaukee Ballet School. Today it is the only dance school in the Midwest accredited by the National Association of Schools of Dance, which allows it to offer work visas to foreign dance students.

On average the company holds 45 performances each year, which have an annual attendance of over 50,000 people. Production of the Nutcracker has become a staple of the company, and it continues to be performed annually since 1977.

The Milwaukee Ballet produces at least one world premiere each year.

== Former dancers ==
- Ryan Martin (2005-2015)
