= List of African-American ballerinas =

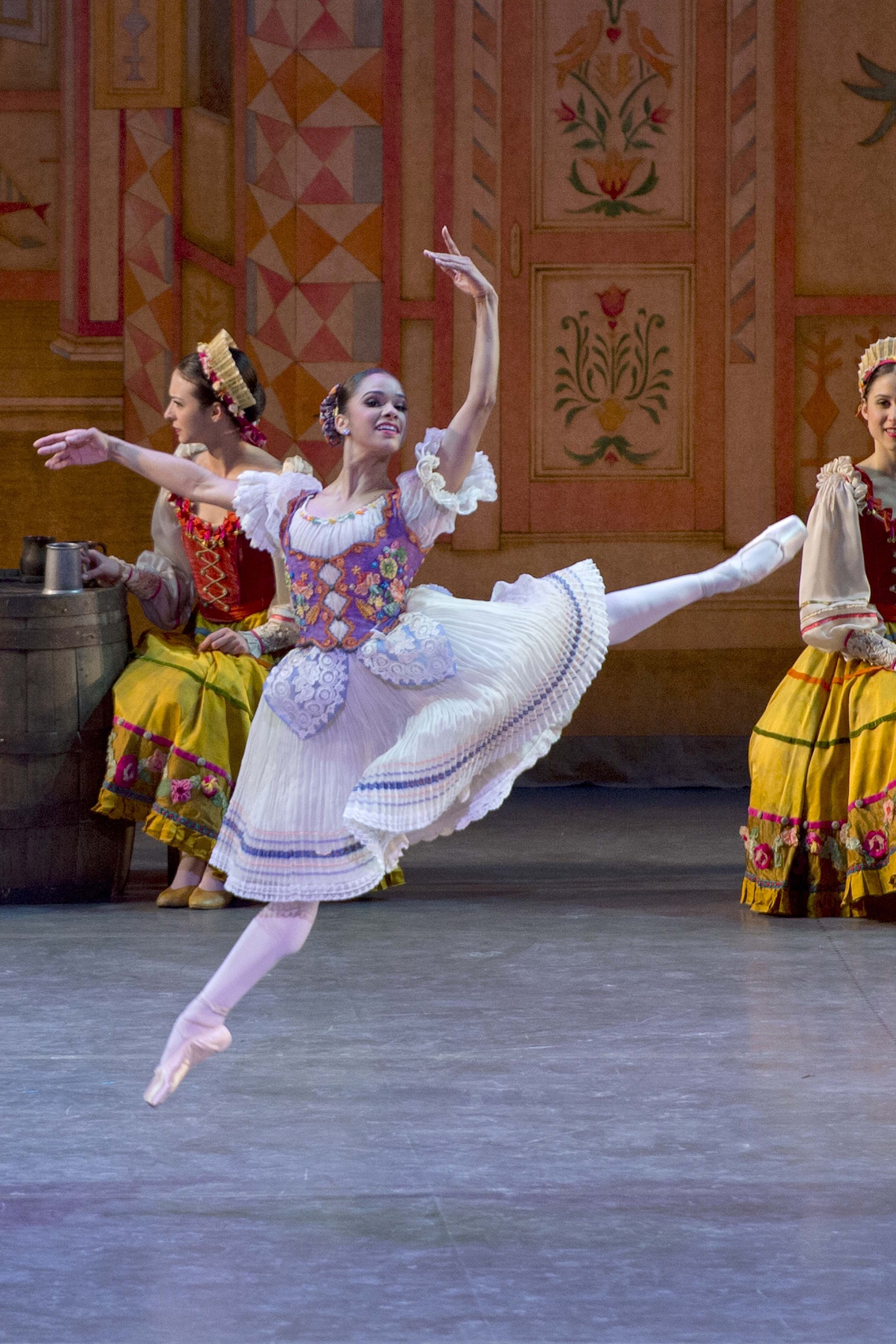
Misty Copeland in Coppélia in 2014

This is a list of notable African-American ballerinas.

== Raven Wilkinson ==
Raven Wilkinson was one of the first African-American ballerinas allowed to join a ballet company. During the 1950s, she danced with the Ballets Russes under the condition that she pose as a white woman by painting her face. After two years of increasing racial discrimination, including threats in the South, she left Ballets Russes and eventually landed a spot in the Dutch National Ballet.

== Janet Collins ==
Janet Collins is the first African American to perform with the Metropolitan Opera ballet. She faced some of the same racial controversies as Raven Wilkinson with Ballets Russes before joining the Metropolitan Opera.

== Debra Austin ==
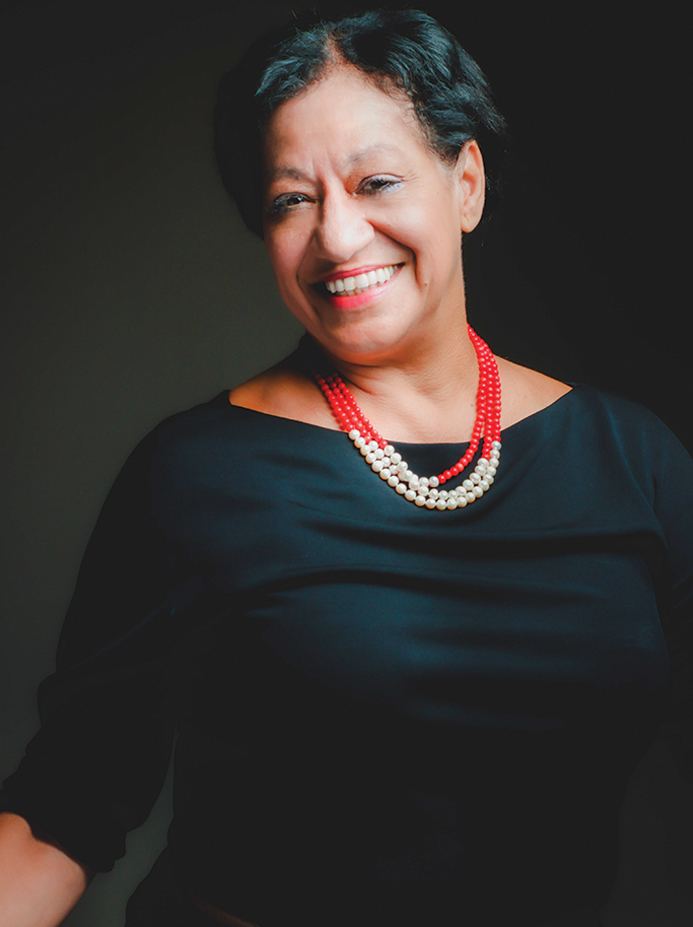
Debra Austin

Debra Austin was the very first African-American ballerina to receive a principal dancer contract with a major American ballet company in 1982 with the Pennsylvania Ballet. There she danced the principal roles in Swan Lake, Giselle, Coppélia, and La Sylphide. Dancing these roles with a white partner was a further breakthrough. Before that time, starting in 1974, Austin was dancing principal and solo roles in George Balanchine's New York City Ballet. Balanchine himself choreographed solos for her as did John Clifford who gave her her first principal role in his ballet Bartók No. 3 (to Piano Concerto No. 3) which was noticed by The New York Times as an historical first for that company.

== Lauren Anderson ==
Lauren Anderson is the first African-American principal dancer of the Houston Ballet.

== Llanchie Stevenson ==
Llanchie Stevenson was the first African-American dancer at Radio City Music Hall Ballet Company and later at the National Ballet of Washington, D.C. She was a founding company member and principal dancer at Dance Theatre of Harlem.

== Aesha Ash ==
Between 1996 and 2003, Aesha Ash danced with the New York City Ballet, where she was the only black woman in the company during most of that time. After that, she joined the Béjart Ballet in Switzerland, then the Alonzo King LINES Ballet in 2007, and retired in 2009. In 2011, she founded the Swan Dream Project to encourage African-American children to start ballet, which includes a summer camp at her hometown, Rochester, New York, and an after-school course in San Jose, California, where she lived at the time. When the School of American Ballet started its diversity committee in 2015, she was one of its founding members. She then began teaching at the school as a guest. In 2020, she joined the school's permanent faculty, and became its first African-American female full-time faculty member.

== Misty Copeland ==
Misty Copeland had a late start in dance, but became one of the few African-American ballerinas to be appointed as a soloist. In June 2015, Copeland became the first African-American female principal dancer in American Ballet Theatre's 75-year history. She retired from ABT in 2025.

== Michaela Mabinty DePrince ==
Michaela DePrince was born in Sierra Leone with vitiligo. She was adopted by an American couple at age four, and started ballet soon after. DePrince was featured in the 2011 ballet documentary First Position. Her career started at Dance Theatre of Harlem, where she became the youngest principal in the company's history. She then joined the Dutch National Ballet as the only dancer of African origin at the time. She rose to soloist at Dutch National Ballet before leaving for a position as second soloist at the Boston Ballet. In addition to her art, she was an ambassador for the NGO War Child. Michaela DePrince passed away in September 2024.

== Precious Adams ==
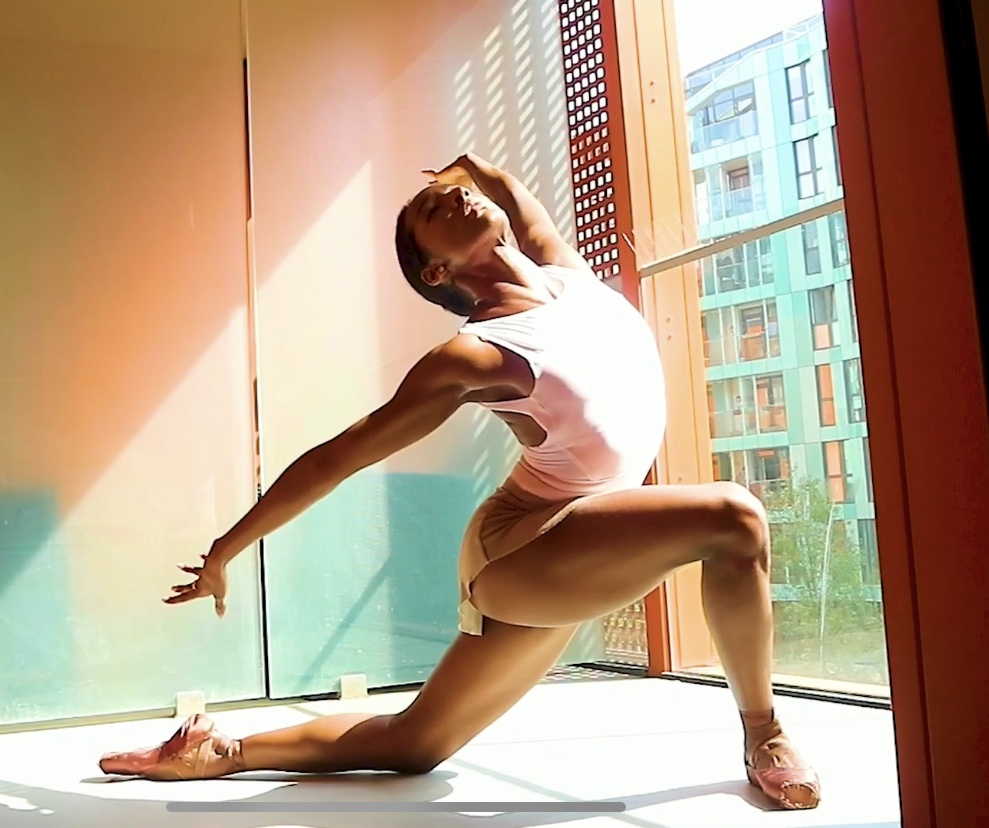
Precious Adams dances for Swans for Relief in 2020

Precious Adams trained at the Bolshoi Ballet Academy in Moscow, Russia, but faced discrimination due to her race including being left out of performances, being prevented from taking part in auditions, and being told to "try and rub the black off." She joined the English National Ballet in 2014, and was promoted to First Artist in 2017. In September 2018, Adams announced that she would no longer perform on stage while wearing pink tights, instead wearing brown tights to match her skin tone. She received criticism from within the ballet industry for her decision, but was supported by the director of the English National Ballet, Tamara Rojo.

== Anne Benna Sims ==
Anne Benna Sims was the first African-American danseuse at American Ballet Theatre (ABT) and the first female African-American soloist in the company's history. Sims danced with Les Grands Ballets Canadiens in 1972. At ABT she was in the first cast of the company premiere of Paul Taylor's Airs (reconstructed by Eileen Cropley); other members of the cast were Lisa Rinehart, Janet Shibata, Rebecca Wright, Brian Adams, Warren Conover and Robert La Fosse. She had earlier been featured in a revival of Antony Tudor's Undertow with Peter Fonseca.

== Virginia Johnson ==
Virginia Johnson was a founding company member and prima ballerina of Dance Theatre of Harlem—known for being the "first Black classical ballet company" and "the first ballet company to prioritize Black dancers". She joined Dance Theatre of Harlem under its co-founders, Arthur Mitchell and Karel Shook, in 1969 when the company was founded. In 2009, Johnson returned to Dance Theatre of Harlem as the company's artistic director.

== Karen Brown ==
Karen Brown danced for Dance Theatre of Harlem from 1973 to 1995. She worked with Arthur Mitchell, Frederic Franklin, Alexandra Danilova, Agnes de Mille and Geoffrey Holder. She served as director of education at the Atlanta Ballet Center for Dance and was the first African-American woman to direct a ballet company when she served as artistic director of Oakland Ballet Company in California.

== Alicia Graf Mack ==
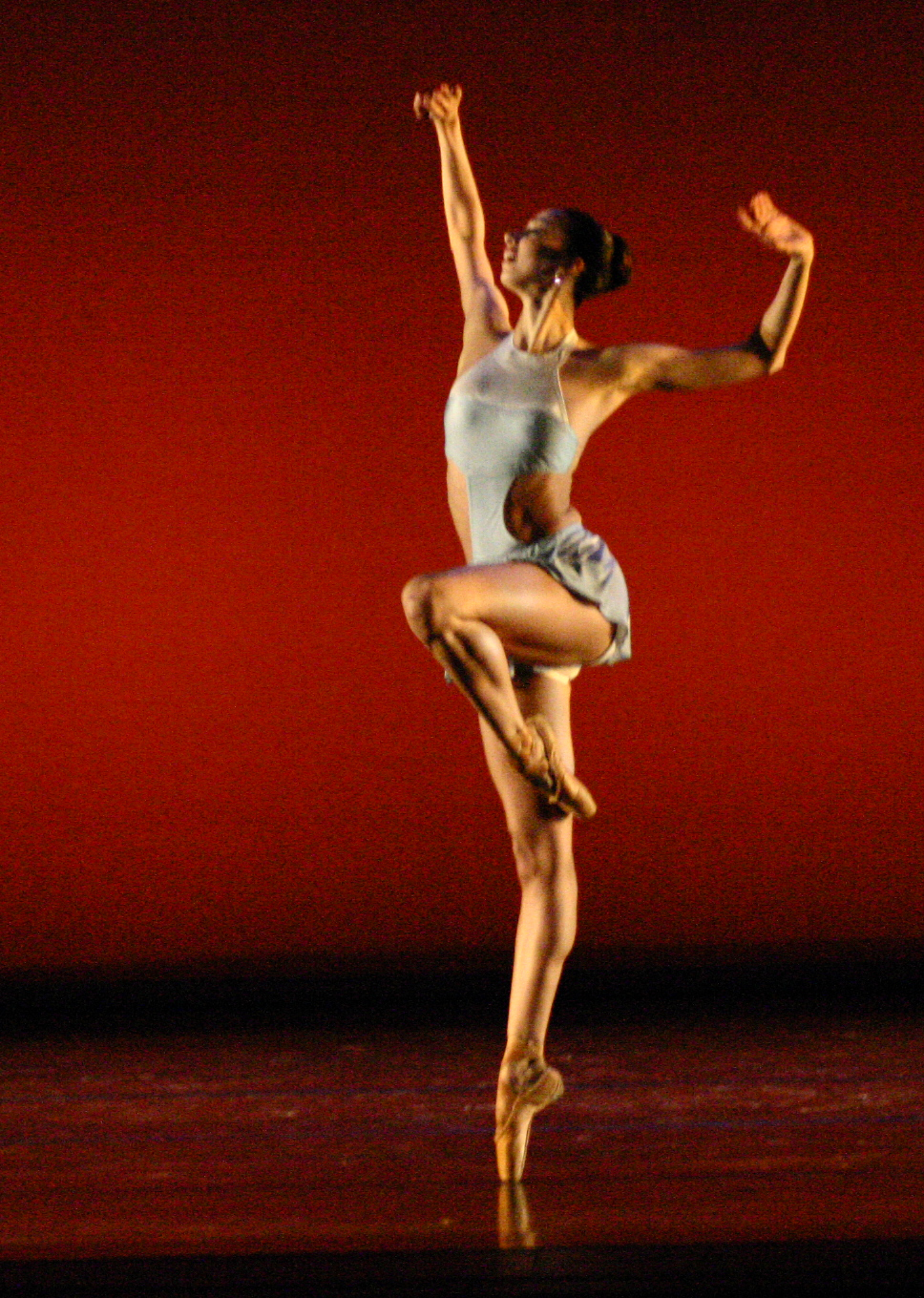
Alicia Graf Mack in Robert Garland's Return

Alicia Graf Mack joined the Dance Theatre of Harlem at the invitation of Arthur Mitchell, but left the company at age 19 due to injuries. After she finished a degree at the Columbia University School of General Studies, she rejoined the company as a principal dancer, and stayed until the company disband in 2004. She joined the Alvin Ailey American Dance Theater the following year. She left in 2008 due to another injury, then finished a master's degree, and joined the faculty of Webster University. She danced with the Ailey company full-time between 2011 and 2014. After that, she started teaching at University of Houston. In 2018, she became the director of dance division at Juilliard School. She is the first woman of color and youngest person to hold this post.

== Olivia Boisson ==
Olivia Boisson is a dancer with New York City Ballet.

== Sydney Magruder Washington ==
Sydney Magruder Washington is a ballet dancer and mental health advocate.

== Chyrstyn Fentroy ==
Chyrstyn Fentroy is a principal dancer with Boston Ballet.

== Alicia Holloway ==
Alicia Holloway is a dancer with Dance Theatre of Harlem who formerly danced with Suzanne Farrell Ballet.

== See also ==
- List of dancers
- List of Russian ballet dancers
- Prima ballerina assoluta
- List of prima ballerinas
