= Karen Brown (ballerina) =

American ballerina, educator, répétiteur, ballet mistress and director

Karen Brown (born 1955 in Okmulgee, Oklahoma) is an American ballerina, educator, répétiteur, ballet mistress, and director. She is noted for her long career as a principal dancer with the Dance Theatre of Harlem and as the first African-American woman to lead a ballet company.

== Early life ==
Born into a family of medical professionals, Brown was raised as one of seven children in Augusta, Georgia. As a child she attended Episcopal Day School alongside her brother Stephen, making them the first African-American children to integrate the institution. At the prompting of her mother, Brown began her ballet studies after turning eight years old to help alleviate her habit of falling. In addition to studying with the former New York City Ballet dancer, Ron Colton, Brown was also a summer scholarship student at the Joffrey Ballet school.

At the age of 17, after having performed with Augusta Civic Ballet for five years, Colton took Brown to a ballet festival in Virginia to present her with new opportunities. There she was scouted by Arthur Mitchell's co-founder of Dance Theatre of Harlem, Karel Shook, who invited her to join the company in New York.

== Career ==
Brown joined Dance Theatre of Harlem as an apprentice in 1973. In 1984 she was profiled by Jennifer Dunning in the New York Times for her versatility as "one of those dancers who is as compelling in plotless ballets as in dramatic works that require her to portray a character". Brown toured as a principal ballerina with DTH to Russia—as the first American company to visit the country after the fall of the Soviet Union—and on the company's post-apartheid visit to South Africa.

Brown's repertoire included William Dollar's Mendelssohn's Concerto, Arthur Mitchell's Holberg's Suite, John Henry, and The Greatest, Geoffrey Holder's Dougla, Bele, and Banda, David Lichine's Graduation Ball, Carmen de Lavallade's Sensemaya, George Balanchine's Agon, Serenade, Concerto Barocco, Stars and Stripes, and Four Temperaments, Glen Tetley's Voluntaries and Dialogues, Agnes de Mille's Fall River Legend, David Gordon's Piano Movers, Frederic Franklin's Swan Lake, Creole Giselle, Paquita, and Pas de Dix, Billy Wilson's Ginastera, Goh Choo San's Variations Serieuses, Robert Garland's Joplin Dances, John Taras' The Firebird, Alonzo King's Signs and Wonders, and Garth Fagan's Footprints Dressed In Red.

While performing with DTH, Brown taught residencies and masterclasses as an associate artist of Arthur Mitchell's Dancing Through The Barriers program. She was featured in a PBS documentary about the program while teaching at The Kennedy Center. After 22 years dancing with the company, Brown left DTH following the conclusion of its 1995 season to join Atlanta Ballet Center for Dance Education as director of education and diversity.

== Directorship ==
Brown entered the international search to find the next artistic director of Oakland Ballet. In 2000 she was invited by the company's board to assume leadership of the institution, making her the first African-American woman to direct a ballet company in history and the first African-American to run a formerly all white led ballet company. Following Dance Theatre of Harlem's suspension of operations in 2004, Brown was the only African-American artistic director of a ballet company in the world. During her tenure, Brown worked to further diversify the ballet's ranks so that it more accurately reflected the cultural demographics of Oakland.

While maintaining Oakland Ballet's tradition of presenting classic ballets from the likes of José Limón, Agnes de Mille, Eugene Loring, and Bronislava Nijinska, she expanded the repertoire to focus on new choreographers such as Trey McIntyre, Francesca Harper, Dwight Rhoden, Dudley Brooks, and Donald McKayle. One of her stated goals as a director was to disprove the belief that it was difficult to find classically trained dancers of color. Then mayor of Oakland Jerry Brown declared Brown's work as great news for the city. To prevent Oakland Ballet from shuttering, Brown canceled its 2004 season, focusing instead on a $500,000 fundraising campaign and hiring a new roster of dancers for the organization's 40th anniversary celebration. Brown departed Oakland in 2007 to join University of The Arts, Philadelphia as an assistant professor in dance.

During her time in Philadelphia, Brown was awarded a $12,500 research grant to analyze dance movement through computer programming, joined the faculty of the Harlem School of The Arts, and returned to performing with Paradigm, a dance company founded by Gus Solomon Jr to feature mature dancers. She was awarded a Bessie Award in 2010 for her performances with the group. She was appointed executive director of Garth Fagan Dance in 2016, and joined Ballet Wichita as guest artistic director in 2017.

She joined University of Missouri Kansas City Conservatory as an assistant professor in 2020.

== Personal life ==
Brown was close friends with the ballet star, Mel Tomlinson who appointed her executor of his estate. She was the only person to respond to his call for help after he contracted HIV.

Brown graduated from St. Mary's College of California in 2013.
