= Creole Giselle =

Creole Giselle is a version of the ballet Giselle in which the story's events are moved to 1840s Louisiana and given an Afro-Creole focus.

== Background ==
For centuries classical ballet has been seen as an elitist art form and has rarely been identified as a form of dance ordinarily performed by African Americans or other minorities. In 1984, Frederic Franklin restaged the traditional European Giselle for the Dance Theatre of Harlem. To many, this restaging was seen as inappropriate and inferior to those based on the 1841 original choreographers, Jean Coralli and Jules Perrot. To others, Creole Giselle was a ground-breaking achievement.

== Dance Theatre of Harlem and Arthur Mitchell ==
The Dance Theatre of Harlem was founded by Arthur Mitchell and Karel Shook in 1969, shortly after the death of Dr. Martin Luther King Jr. Arthur Mitchell was the first African-American soloist for the New York City Ballet. In 1955, he was chosen by George Balanchine and Lincoln Kirstein to join the company. Mitchell's career boomed during the pre-civil rights era and set the precedent for African Americans in concert dance, specifically classical ballet. Mitchell and Shook were influenced by the “optimism and idealism of the Civil Rights Era” when they founded the school in the community where Mitchell spent his adolescent years, Harlem, New York. Mitchell's plan was to give underprivileged children the same opportunities that he had as a teenager. The mission statement of the company is to “present a ballet company of African-American and other racially diverse artists who perform the most demanding repertory at the highest level of quality.” This statement stays true to what Mitchell has done throughout the years, either through touring the company or community outreach.

== Frederic Franklin ==
Frederic Franklin was born in Liverpool, England, in 1914 and at the age of six his mother took him to his first dance class. From an early age, Franklin was noticed for his innate capacity for remembering dance steps. When Franklin moved to Paris, he dabbled in cabaret and then moved to London to continue performing in numerous cabarets and vaudeville with the Vic-Wells Ballet, now known as the Royal Ballet. In 1935, Franklin joined the Markova-Dolin Ballet, and it was through his dancing with this company that he was seen and asked by Léonide Massine to join the new Ballet Russe de Monte-Carlo. Franklin signed a four-year contract with the company, which proved to be the most significant opportunity in his career. In 1952, he founded the Slavenska/Franklin Ballet with Mia Slavenska. After touring Japan and the Philippines, the company folded due to management and financial problems. He returned to the Ballet Russe shortly afterwards and restaged the repertory that had been lost when Ballet Russe de Monte Carlo folded. Through his work with The George Balanchine Foundation, he became the artistic advisor of the Dance Theatre of Harlem.

== Traditional staging of Giselle ==
The award-winning ballet Giselle was set in the Rhineland of the Middle Ages during the grape harvest. Giselle, a peasant girl, falls in love with her neighbor Loys, the man whom Count Albrecht disguises himself as. A forester, Hilarion, loves Giselle, but she pays him no mind. During Giselle's celebration of the end of the grape harvest, Hilarion discovers Loy's real identity. The Duke of Courland and his daughter, Bathilde, Albrecht's future wife, arrive and are welcomed by the peasants. Hilarion tells Giselle the truth about Loys, just as she is being crowned Queen of the Village. In shock, Giselle tries to kill herself with Albrecht's sword, but dies from a weak heart. The Wilis are the ghosts of young girls who die before their wedding day, and who avenge themselves by making men who come to their graveyard dance themselves to death. One night, Hilarion visits Giselle's grave and the Wilis kill him. Albrecht brings lilies to Giselle's grave and she appears to him. As the Wilis attempt to kill Albrecht, Giselle asks Myrtha, the Queen of the Wilis, to save him. Albrecht is spared, but Giselle must return to her grave.

== Reconstruction of Giselle ==
The adaptation by the Dance Theatre of Harlem (DTH) of this traditional version of Giselle is very similar to the original, except for a few changes in the storyline and variations in the choreography. The narrative, the choreography, and the music by French composer Adolphe Charles Adam are kept the same as the original Giselle.

The ballet is also set in Louisiana during the 1840s, and consists of an all-African American cast. The dancers wear costumes similar to the daily dress of African Americans in the 1840s. During this time social status among freed blacks was measured by how far removed one's family was from slavery. Giselle's character is kept the same; her greatest joy is to dance. Albrecht is now Albert and the Wilis are the ghosts of young girls who adore dancing and die of a broken heart.
