= Melanie Person =

American dancer and choreographer (born 1965)

Melanie Person (born 1965 in Jackson, Mississippi) is an American dancer, choreographer, and educator who began her career at 14 as a "baby ballerina" with the Dance Theatre of Harlem. She is currently the co-director of the Alvin Ailey American Dance Theater's Ailey School, with Tracy Inman.

== Early life ==
Born in Jackson, Mississippi, Person, who is African American, began her ballet studies at the age of six. She continued her training in Columbia, South Carolina at the Calvert-Brodie School of Dance under the tutelage of Ann Brodie. As a child prodigy, she performed with Columbia City Ballet and at the age of 12 was profiled by Ebony Jr. -- the children's edition of Ebony magazine—for her dedication to dance. In 1976 she attended the Dance Theatre of Harlem's summer course on scholarship and was asked to join the company as an apprentice at the program's conclusion. In 1979, after graduating from the Professional Children's School early, she was promoted to the corps de ballet at the age of 14.

== Career ==
During her dance career traveling around the world with DTH, Person performed in a wide repertoire that included ballets by Arthur Mitchell, Agnes de Mille, George Balanchine, Michael Smuin, Bronislava Nijinska, Glen Tetley, Billy Wilson, and re-stagings of Marius Petipa's ballets by Alexandra Danilova and Frederic Franklin. Person left DTH in 1988 to attain her degree in dance from Empire State College, while continuing to collaborate with her former ballet colleagues Virginia Johnson and Judy Tyrus by creating new choreography for a project called "Developed Dancers Making Dances".

Denise Jefferson, the director of The Ailey School—official school of the Alvin Ailey American Dance Theater—invited Person to join the institution as a ballet instructor in 1999. A year later Person took over as chairperson of the ballet department and became co-director of the school's junior division with Tracy Inman. In 2009 she was named an associate director. Following Jefferson's death in 2010, Person and Inman were appointed co-directors of The Ailey School.

== Leading The Ailey School ==
Since ascending to co-directorship, Person has collaborated with Robert Battle—artistic director of Alvin Ailey American Dance Theater—on recruiting for and running his choreographic lab, spearheaded the Ailey/Fordham BFA Benefit concert, served as a judge or chairwoman of the jury for the Youth American Grand Prix, Japan Grand Prix, Seoul International Dance competition, Dance Prix de New York, & the West Virginia Dance Festival, sat on the board of directors for the National Association of Schools of Dance, and taken over the national audition tour for the school's summer intensive and Ailey/Fordham University BFA Program alongside her co-director Tracy Inman and tour adjudicator Lakey Evans-Peña.

As part of Dance Theatre of Harlem's 45th anniversary, Person and her former leading ballerina colleagues were honoured by the company in a dance tribute at New York City Center. In tandem with Joan Myers Brown, Donald Byrd, Natasha Hulme, and April Magen, she sits on the advisory board of Memoirs of Blacks in Ballet.
