= Jillana =

American ballet dancer (born 1934)

- Born: Jill Zimmerman; 1934 (age 91–92); Hackensack, New Jersey, U.S.
- Education: School of American Ballet
- Occupations: Ballet dancer, instructor
- Years active: 1947–present
- Organizations: New York City Ballet, American Ballet Theatre, National Ballet of Washington D.C.
- Known for: Principal dancer with New York City Ballet
- Notable work: Liebeslieder Walzer (Balanchine)

Jillana (born 1934) is an American ballet dancer and instructor, and a former principal dancer with New York City Ballet.

== Early life and education ==
Jillana was born Jill Zimmerman in Hackensack, New Jersey. She took lessons in tap and ballet dancing as a small child. Jillana attended the School of American Ballet, beginning at age 11, after earning a scholarship. She trained there under George Balanchine. She was recruited by the New York City Ballet (then known as Ballet Society) one year later; when she was thirteen she made her first appearance with the company. At age 17, she was featured in Seventeen magazine, in the January 1952 issue.

== Career ==
After six years of experience with the New York City Ballet company, she was promoted to principal dancer; she continued in this capacity for twenty years. Balanchine created roles for her in many ballets, including Liebeslieder Walzer.

Jillana has danced with a number of partners, including Jacques d'Amboise, Arthur Mitchell, and Edward Villella. Jillana has also performed with other ballet companies including American Ballet Theatre and National Ballet of Washington, D.C. She has appeared on Broadway, in the musical Destry Rides Again, and in a number of television shows, including Noah and the Flood (with choreography by George Balanchine).

Jillana has worked as an instructor at New York City Ballet, School of American Ballet, Joffrey School, Paris Opera Ballet and Ballet West.

Jillana now runs her own summer dance program, The Jillana School. She sets ballets on companies worldwide for the George Balanchine Trust.
