= Virginia Johnson =

Virginia Johnson may refer to:

- Virginia E. Johnson (1925–2013), sex therapist and author
- Virginia Johnson (athlete) (born 1979), US track & field athlete, in 2005 World Championships in Athletics – Women's heptathlon
- Virginia Wales Johnson (1849–1916), American novelist
- Virginia Johnson (dancer), artistic director of Dance Theatre of Harlem
