= Barbara Milberg =

American academic and professional dancer (1931–2020)

Barbara Anne Milberg Fisher (November 6, 1931 – May 31, 2020) was an American academic and professional dancer. She was professor emerita of English at the City College of the City University of New York (CUNY), where she taught for 29 years. She published several works, including on the life of Wallace Stevens. Prior to her academic career, under her maiden name, Barbara Milberg, she danced with the short-lived Ballet Society, founded by George Balanchine and Lincoln Kirstein; became soloist with the New York City Ballet (NYCB) in its first decade; and then joined Jerome Robbins's newly formed Ballets: USA, touring Europe and the States with that company as a principal dancer.

== Early life and education ==
Barbara Anne Milberg was born in Brooklyn, New York on November 6, 1931. The daughter of immigrant Ukrainian Jews, Barbara, who grew up with an older brother, David, in Brooklyn, was a student of classical piano from childhood. By the age of six she had survived dysentery and pneumonia, and her parents (father, a dentist; mother, a hygienist) enrolled her in ballet lessons to build up her strength. For several years she studied at the School of American Ballet, and, in 1946, at 14 years old, was invited by Balanchine to join Ballet Society, the beginning of her career as a professional dancer, which extended to 1962.

== Dancing career ==
As a child, Milberg began dancing lessons in Brooklyn with a teacher she knew only as "Selma," and subsequently enrolled as a student at the School of American Ballet (SAB) for further training. In the early 1940s, she began to study classical piano with Dorothy Taubman, who prepared her for admission to New York's High School of Music and Art. At SAB, her teachers included Pierre Vladimiroff, Muriel Stuart, Anatole Oboukhov, Felia Doubrovska, and, after joining Ballet Society, Balanchine. Her first performance in Ballet Society was in 1946, as a member of the corps de ballet in Balanchine's Mozart work Symphonie Concertante.

During her twelve years as a member of the New York City Ballet, she danced in the company's regular seasons at the City Center of Music & Drama, in New York, and traveled with NYCB on five extended European tours and three national American tours. She rose from corps de ballet to soloist, performed principal roles in Balanchine's one-act Swan Lake and in Frederick Ashton's Illuminations (as "Profane Love", an erotic role originally choreographed for Melissa Hayden), and danced in the premières of Balanchine ballets still in repertory today. She also danced in ballets by Balanchine that are only occasionally performed now, including his 1948 Orpheus (where she was first a Fury then promoted to Bacchante) and, when not dancing, was a page-turner for Balanchine's rehearsal pianist Nicholas Kopeikine. She performed in the 1954 Arnold Schoenberg ballet Opus 34 and, as a soloist, in the 1955 Georges Bizet ballet Roma. She was one of the principal dancers in the 1956 Divertimento No. 15, one of Balanchine's rare Mozart works, and in the 1957 Stravinsky-Balanchine collaboration Agon, she danced the Gailliard duet with Barbara Walczak. This was the last new ballet Milberg performed with the company. With NYCB she played the role of Leto in the 1951 revival production of Balanchine's 1928 Apollo and one of the three Ladies of the Night in his choreography for NBC Opera Theatre's production of The Magic Flute, televised in 1956. With Balanchine and NYCB principal Francisco Moncion, Milberg was at Balanchine's invitation a co-choreographer of NYCB's 1955 production of Bizet's Jeux d'Enfants.

Milberg worked with Jerome Robbins, who, as early as 1949, cast her in The Guests, his first ballet for NYCB. In 1958, shortly after her marriage, Robbins invited her to join his newly formed company, Ballets: USA, as a principal dancer. Ballets: USA, which opened Gian-Carlo Menotti's newly organized Spoleto Festival in '58, performed mostly in Europe, including in Athens and Dubrovnik, and Milberg toured with it. Her repertory there included the role of The Butterfly in Robbins's 1956 comic work, The Concert, and the female lead in his pas de deux, Afternoon of a Faun—both roles created for Tanaquil LeClercq. On April 11, 1962, Milberg was among the Ballets: USA dancers who performed for President John F. Kennedy and his wife, the first ballet company to perform at the White House. That was the last performance of her ballet career.

In 2006, Wesleyan University Press published Fisher's book-length memoirs of her years as a dancer, In Balanchine's Company: A Dancer's Memoir. At the time, it was the first book by a Balanchine-and-Robbins dancer to recall in detail the period of Ballet Society and the earliest years of the New York City Ballet. The book received critical praise from the New York Times, dance critic Jack Anderson, who wrote "Barbara Fisher's prose makes the history she lived come alive again", and the book continues to be cited in articles and essays by ballet critics and scholars.

== Academic career ==
In the mid-1970s, after earning her B.A. and M.A., Fisher taught Freshman English at several colleges while studying for her Ph.D. She received her doctorate in 1980 from the Graduate School of CUNY. She joined the English faculty at City College as an adjunct lecturer and retired from City College, as a full professor, in 2003. She still publishes essays and reviews and attends conferences and scholarly societies, including the Columbia Shakespeare Society, where she is an Associate Member.

Fisher's teaching career began in 1974, first as a Graduate Fellow at Queens College, CUNY, followed by two years at Rutgers University, in Newark, NJ. After receiving her doctorate, she was invited to join the English faculty at City College, where she earned her tenure. At City College, she taught at both graduate and undergraduate levels and designed a number of new courses. She served on the Executive, Library, and Literature Committees, judged entries for the annual English Awards Convocation, and for several years directed the department's English Honors Program. As president of the Gamma Chapter of Phi Beta Kappa, in 1998, she engaged guest speakers for the semi-annual meetings, including Arlene Croce, then dance critic for The New Yorker, who spoke on "Degas and Balanchine at the Source".

== Personal life and death ==
In 1957, she married Howard Shreve Fisher III, with whom she had three children: Alexandra Childs (b. 1961), Benji Nichols (b. 1963), and Samuel Barber (b. 1969). The couple divorced in 1967. She is grandmother of Alice (b. 1992) and Leonard (b. 1994), and currently lives in New York City.

Milberg Fisher died on May 31, 2020, at the age of 88.

== Published works ==
=== Books ===
In addition to her ballet memoir, Fisher is the author of two volumes on literature: Wallace Stevens: The Intensest Rendezvous (University Press of Virginia, 1990, ISBN 978-0813912486) and Noble Numbers, Subtle Words: The Art of Mathematics in the Science of Storytelling (Fairleigh Dickinson & Associated University Presses, 1997, ISBN 978-1611471526). Noble Numbers, Subtle Words was nominated for a Phi Beta Kappa Award in Science, and is an exploration of number, geometry, and abstract mathematical concepts in works of authors including Shakespeare, Milton, Henry James, Jorge Luis Borges, and Toni Morrison. Stanley Cavell, then a professor of philosophy at Harvard, called the study "distinguished", and Charles Altieri, then at the University of California, Berkeley, described it as "an utterly brilliant book".

=== Other works ===
Fisher's shorter essays and critical writings have appeared in Oxford's multi-volume American National Biography (where she contributed an essay on Stevens), the Wallace Stevens Journal, Virginia Review, Bucknell Review, the American Book Review, and Dance Chronicle: Studies in Dance and the Related Arts (eds. George Dorris and Jack Anderson, Routledge, 2005). She has written on choreographic idiom in Modernist poetry and on the plays of George Bernard Shaw: Her essay on Fanny's First Play initially appeared in Shaw 7: The Neglected Plays, Alfred Turco, Jr., ed. (Pennsylvania State University Press, 1987) and was reprinted in Modern Critical Views: George Bernard Shaw, Harold Bloom, ed. (Infobase [Facts on File/Chelsea House], 1987). She has presented papers on "The Heroine, the Star Goddess, and the Invention of Mathematics" (CUNY English Forum, 1984) to "A Woman with the Hair of a Pythoness" (reprinted in Wallace Stevens and the Feminine [University of Alabama, 1993]) to "Milton's Diabolical Calculus: Pandaemonium in Paradise Lost" (Symposium for Medieval, Renaissance & Baroque Studies, University of Miami, 2001). In 1995, Fisher spoke on "Wallace Stevens & Modern Art" (NYU's Mishkin Gallery) and was a TV panelist in a discussion of James Joyce and G. B. Shaw (Metroview, Channel 75). In 2008, she contributed an essay, "Some Other Where: As Ballet, as Musical," to The New Kittredge Shakespeare's edition of The Tragedy of Romeo and Juliet, contrasting films of The Royal Ballet's Romeo and Juliet, choreographed by Kenneth MacMillan, and the Hollywood film of Jerome Robbins's West Side Story. Her essay "Stevens Dancing: 'Something Light, Winged, Holy,'" was included in Wallace Stevens, New York, and Modernism, an anthology edited by Lisa Goldfarb and Bart Eeckhout (Routledge, 2012), which comprises a published selection of papers read at the 2010 "Wallace Stevens, New York, and Modernism" conference, at New York University.

== Awards and recognition ==
- 1997: Rivkind Fellowship, CUNY (to work on In Balanchine's Company)
- 1989: PSC-CUNY Research Award (to work on "Number, Geometry & Glyphic Coding in Dramatic Fiction")
