= Alicia Graf Mack =

American dancer

- Born: Alicia J. Graf; 1978 or 1979 (age 47–48); San Jose, California, U.S.
- Education: Columbia University (BA); Washington University in St. Louis (MA)
- Occupations: dancer; teacher
- Employer(s): Alvin Ailey American Dance Theater; Webster University; Washington University in St. Louis; University of Houston; The Juilliard School
- Organization: D(n)A Arts Collective
- Spouse: Kirby Mack
- Children: 2

Alicia Graf Mack (née Alicia J. Graf, born 1978/1979) is an American dancer, teacher, and artistic director. She was a member of Dance Theatre of Harlem and Alvin Ailey American Dance Theater, and has performed with Beyoncé, John Legend, and Alicia Keys. Mack has taught dance at Washington University in St. Louis, Webster University, and University of Houston. In 2018, she was named the first Black Dean and Director of the Dance Division at Juilliard School, the youngest person to hold that role. During her Juilliard tenure, she has been credited with "remaking Juilliard Dance." In November 2024, it was announced that Mack would leave Juilliard in 2025 to become artistic director of the Alvin Ailey American Dance Theater.

== Early life ==
Graf Mack was born in San Jose, California, and grew up in Columbia, Maryland to a white father and Black mother who was a professor at Howard University. Graf Mack stated she is distantly related to Russian painter and designer Léon Bakst, who had designed costumes and sets for Ballets Russes. She started dancing at age 3, and competitively at age 12. She studied at a public high school and trained at Ballet Royale Academy, and attended summer intensives at American Ballet Theatre and School of American Ballet.

== Career ==
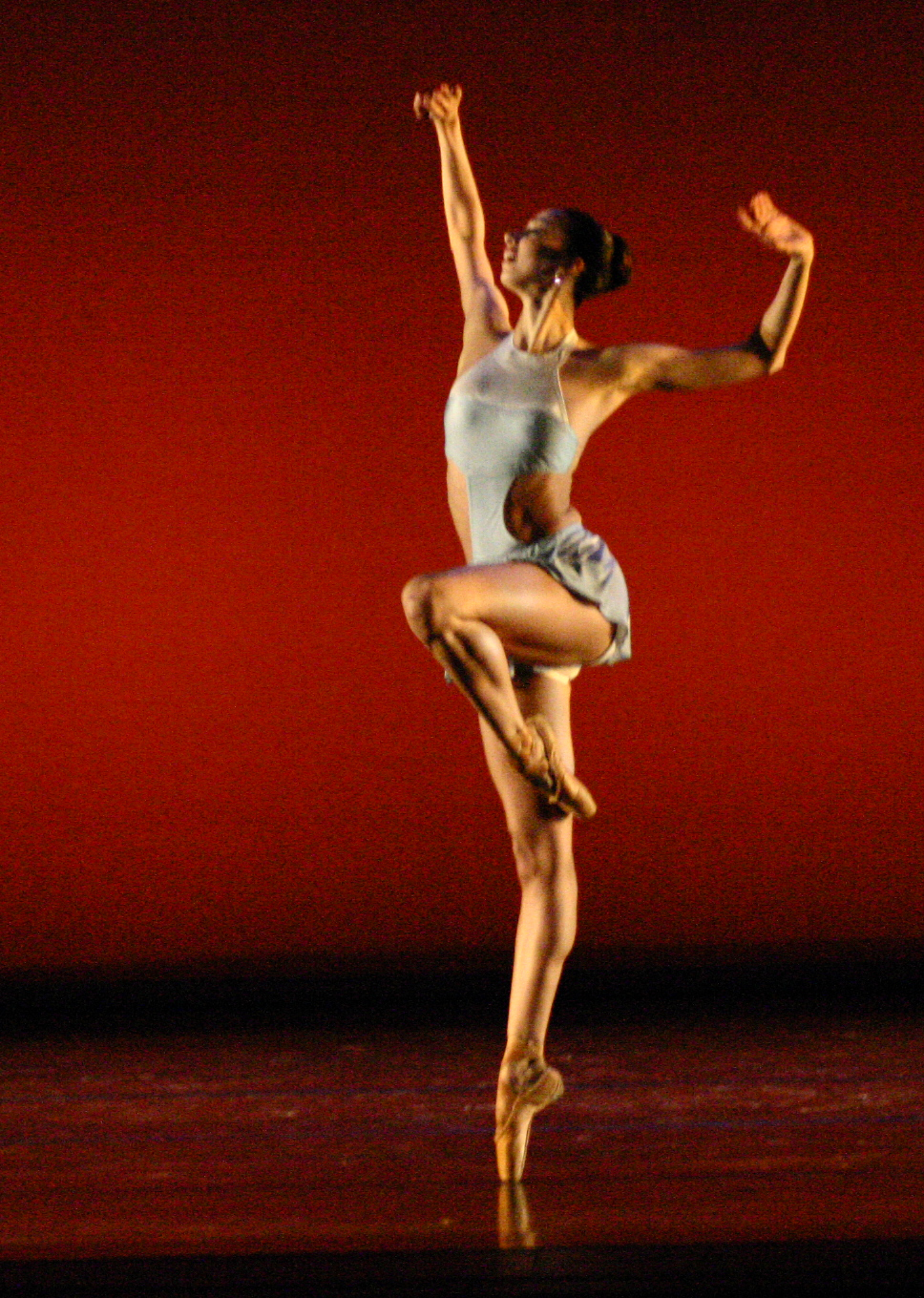
Graf Mack in Robert Garland's Return

While a senior in high school, Graf Mack took class with Dance Theatre of Harlem, a predominantly African-American ballet company, and was offered an apprenticeship by the company's founder Arthur Mitchell. She relocated to New York to join the company at age 17 and finished high school with Professional Children's School. She was eventually promoted to soloist.

At age 19, Graf Mack was diagnosed with ankylosing spondylitis, which required surgeries. She left the Dance Theatre of Harlem, then started studying at Columbia University School of General Studies, and graduated with a BA in history. During her study, she interned at JPMorgan Chase on corporate giving and philanthropy. After she graduated, Mitchell offered her a principal dancer contract, so she returned and stayed with the company until it was disbanded in 2004. Graf Mack noted she auditioned at American Ballet Theatre and New York City Ballet, but was told that the female dancer quota was filled and she was too tall.

In 2005, Graf Mack joined Alvin Ailey American Dance Theater, a modern dance company. In her company debut, New York Times wrote that she "was so good she became the news of the night all by herself." In 2008, she left due to an injury. She moved to St. Louis, Missouri to study an MA in nonprofit management at Washington University in St. Louis, while teaching ballet and modern dance at Webster University. After she graduated, she joined Webster University as full-time faculty.

In 2011, Graf Mack rejoined the Ailey company, and danced the company premiere of Wayne McGregor's Chroma in 2013. She retired from the company in 2014. She rejoined Webster University, while teaching at Washington University as an adjunct. Three years later, she joined the faculty at University of Houston and was a visiting professor at Webster University.

Graf Mack formed a dance collective, D(n)A Arts Collective, with her sister Daisha Graf, a commercial dancer. As a guest dancer, she had danced with Alonzo King LINES Ballet, and for Beyoncé, John Legend, Andre 3000 and Alicia Keys. She is also a contributor of Pointe Magazine, including the 2014 June/July cover story, which featured Ashley Murphy, Ebony Williams and Misty Copeland, all of whom are African-American ballet dancer.

In 2018, it was announced that Graf Mack would take over as the Director of Dance Division at Juilliard School. She is the first woman of color and youngest person to hold this position. Later that year, following Arthur Mitchell's death, she performed a solo Mitchell choreographed on her at his memorial, at Mitchell's request.

Beginning July 1, 2025, Mack became artistic director of the Alvin Ailey American Dance Theater, the largest modern dance company in the United States.She credits her earlier experience as a dancer at Ailey, "the idea that your identity, body type and uniqueness are seen as an asset" as motivating one of her her goals as artistic director. "We have dancers of color, dancers who represent the beauty of the world in our company, in our schools — extremely diverse, and we always want to amplify and honor that to be an example for the rest of the field and the rest of the world."

== Personal life ==
After living in New Jersey, Graf Mack currently lives in East St. Louis with her husband, Kirby Mack, whom she met at Columbia and their two children.
