= Stephanie Dabney =

African American dancer (1958–2022)

- Born: July 11, 1958; Philadelphia, Pennsylvania, U.S.
- Died: September 28, 2022 (aged 64); New York City, U.S.
- Years active: 1975–1996
- Career
- Dances: Ballet

Stephanie Renee Dabney (July 11, 1958 – September 28, 2022) was an American dancer who performed as a prima ballerina with Dance Theatre of Harlem from 1979 through 1994. Dabney is best known for her performances in John Taras' The Firebird, which she performed all over the world, as well as at the opening ceremony of the 1984 Summer Olympics in Los Angeles.

== Early life ==
Born in Philadelphia, Pennsylvania into a military family, Dabney was raised in Youngstown, Ohio where she began her ballet training at Ballet Western Reserve at the age of 4. After seeing the Alvin Ailey American Dance Theater perform on tour, with dancers who looked like her, Dabney decided to become a professional dancer. The following year, Dance Theatre of Harlem conducted a residency in her town, during which Dabney enrolled in a masterclass with the company. Arthur Mitchell, co-founder and artistic director of DTH, observed her in class and invited her to study at his school in New York. Because she had already been awarded a scholarship to study at The Ailey School, she declined.

However, after one week at The Ailey School she realized that she preferred ballet to modern dance and decided to transfer to Dance Theatre Harlem's school. Three months later, in 1975, she joined the company as an apprentice under the name Stephanie Baxter.

== Career ==
Working her way up through the company's repertory, Dabney had her breakthrough when John Taras selected her to premiere in the title role of his new version of The Firebird with costumes and sets by Geoffrey Holder. Dabney received ecstatic reviews from the three leading dance critics at The New York Times, Anna Kisselgoff, Jennifer Dunning, and Jack Anderson, for her performance. From that point onward, "Stephanie Baxter" was billed as "Stephanie Dabney".

Capitalizing on the success of Firebird, Arthur Mitchell had the company's Kennedy Center premiere of the work filmed and shown as part of Kennedy Center Tonight on WNET-TV at 9. The resulting program, Stravinsky's 'Firebird' by Dance Theatre of Harlem, featured a documentary on behind-the-scenes aspects of the production, and interviews with the creative team, followed by a live performance. This presentation was directed by Kirk Browning and produced and edited for Pittsburgh station WQED-TV by Beverly Baroff. Two years later, Dabney was invited to perform as the Firebird alongside DTH as part of the opening ceremony of The 1984 Summer Olympics in Los Angeles.

Over the course of her career with DTH, Dabney was celebrated for her performances in a wide range of repertory that included: George Balanchine's Concerto Barocco, The Four Temperaments, and Allegro Brilliante, Glenn Tetley's Voluntaries, Bronislava Nijinska's Rondo Capriccioso, Arthur Mitchell's Manifestations, Ruth Page and Bentley Stone's Frankie and Johnny, Billy Wilson's Concerto in F, and Frederic Franklin's Swan Lake & Creole Giselle.

== Retirement ==
In 1990 Dabney was diagnosed with HIV. In 1996, following a year long battle with opportunistic infections, she formally retired from performing. Since retirement she has taught ballet at Spelman College. Dabney died at a nursing home in Manhattan, New York City on September 28, 2022, from cardiopulmonary arrest at the age of 64. She also taught ballet at the Dekalb Center for the Performing Arts at Avondale High School before the school name was changed to the Dekalb School of the Arts.
