= Ingrid Silva =

Brazilian ballet dancer

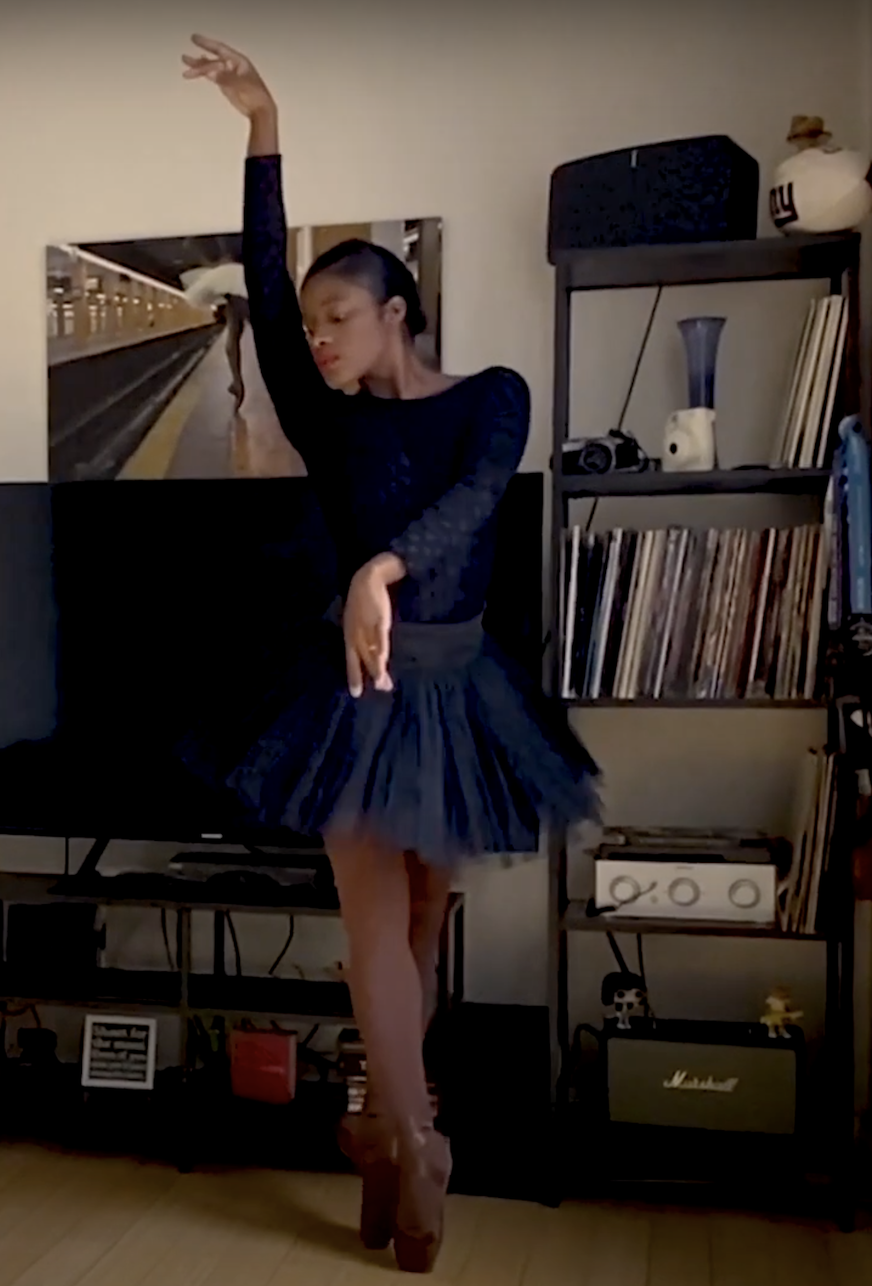
- Ingrid Silva dances for Swans for Relief (2020)
- Born: 1988 or 1989 (age 36–37); Rio de Janeiro, Brazil
- Occupation: ballet dancer
- Children: 1
- Career
- Current group: Dance Theatre of Harlem
- Website: www.ingridsilvaballet.com

Ingrid Silva (born 1988/89) is a Brazilian ballet dancer who currently performs with the Dance Theatre of Harlem in New York City.

== Early life ==
Silva was born and raised in Rio de Janeiro, to a father who served in the air force and mother who was a maid. At age 8, she started ballet through a community out-reach program, then trained at Dançando Para Não Dançar, Theatro Municipal's school, and under Deborah Colker and Pedro Pederneiras.

== Career ==
At age 17, Silva became an apprentice with Grupo Corpo. In 2008, at age 18, Silva moved to New York City as there were very few opportunities for Black dancers in Brazil. Shortly after she arrived, Dance Theatre of Harlem's founder Arthur Mitchell invited her to join DTH Ensemble, the junior company that performed when the main company was disbanded. In 2012, when the main company was reinstated, Silva joined the company permanently.

Silva has called for greater diversity in ballet. In an appearance on The Today Show, Silva noted that she has to color her pointe shoes, a process known as "pancaking", as most brands only provide light shade options. In 2020, she appeared in a Nike advertisement celebrating Black History Month, narrated by Serena Williams. Later that year, Silva danced The Swan in Misty Copeland's fundraiser, Swans for Relief, a response to the impact of the COVID-19 coronavirus pandemic on the dance community, with funds going to participating dancers' companies and other related relief funds.

Outside of ballet, Silva co-founded EmpowHerNY, a platform with different women to take over its Instagram account.

== Personal life ==
In November 2020, Silva gave birth to her daughter.
