= Olivia Boisson =

American ballet dancer

- Born: Forest Hills, Queens; New York City, New York; United States
- Education: School of American Ballet
- Occupation: Ballet dancer
- Years active: 2012–present
- Career
- Current group: New York City Ballet

Olivia Boisson is an American ballet dancer. In 2013, she joined the corps de ballet at New York City Ballet, becoming the first black person to join the company in a decade.

== Biography ==
Olivia Boisson was born in Queens, New York to Haitian immigrants. She began dancing when she was six years old, training at The Ballet Arts School of Forest Hills in Forest Hills, Queens. In 2000, she studied classical ballet at the Dance Theatre of Harlem. In 2004, she enrolled as a full-time student at the School of American Ballet and was the only African-American dancer in her year. She was a recipient of the Mae L. Wien Award in 2012, joining the New York City Ballet as an apprentice that same year. In December 2013, she became a member of the company's corps de ballet, becoming the first black dancer to join the company in a decade.

Her repertoire at New York City Ballet has included roles in George Balanchine's ballets such as Prayer in Coppélia, Coffee in The Nutcracker, Chaconne, and The Four Temperaments. She has also danced as a princess in Peter Martins' Swan Lake and Cellos in Jerome Robbins' Fanfare. As a member of the corps de ballet, she was an original cast member in JR's Les Bosquets.

In 2018, in honor of Nelson Mandela's 100th birthday, Boisson was featured in Melika Dez and Jeremy McQueen's 100 FISTS, a photography series that featured black dancers in New York City. That same year, Boisson and other members of New York City Ballet modeled for Puma's Spring/Summer collection and their Do You campaign.
