= Virginia Johnson (dancer) =

American ballerina

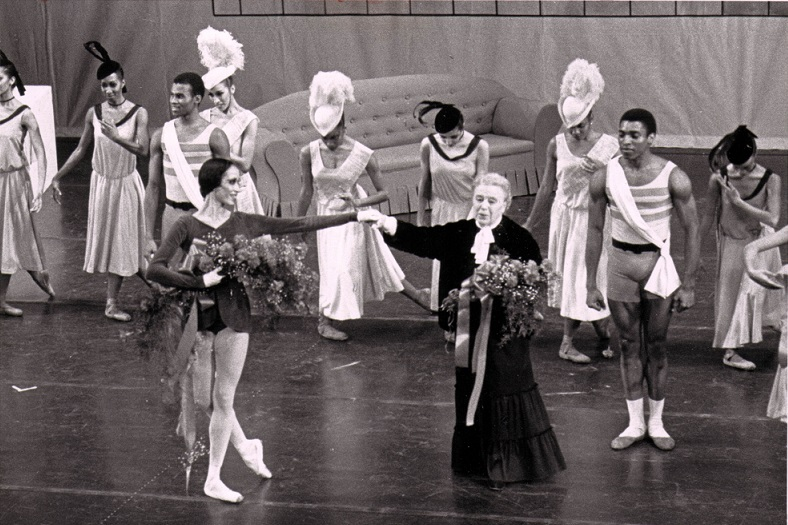
- Principal dancers of Dance Theatre of Harlem Virginia Johnson and Eddie J. Shellman with Irina Nijinska during the curtain calls after DTH's revival of Les Biches, 1983.
- Born: 1950 (age 75–76); Washington, D.C. United States
- Education: The Washington School of Ballet
- Occupations: ballet dancer, magazine editor, artistic director
- Career
- Former groups: Dance Theatre of Harlem
- Education: Fordham University

Virginia Johnson (born 1950) is an American ballet dancer, choreographer and journalist. She retired in 2023 as the artistic director of Dance Theatre of Harlem, having served as a founding member and principal dancer. From 2000 to 2009 she was the editor-in-chief of Pointe.

== Early life ==
Johnson was born and raised in Washington, D.C. Her training in classical ballet began at the age of three under Therrell Smith, a friend of her mother's who had trained under Mathilde Kschessinska. At thirteen years old, Johnson was accepted as a scholarship student by The Washington School of Ballet, where she trained under Mary Day. She was the only African-American student attending the school, and graduated in 1968.

== Career ==
Johnson moved to New York City and attended New York University as a dance major. In a class taught by Arthur Mitchell, she was presented with the opportunity to co-found a new ballet company with him, leading to the creation of Dance Theatre of Harlem (1969). As its principal dancer, she performed lead roles including Agon, A Streetcar Named Desire, Creole Giselle, Concerto Barocco, Allegro Brillante, Fall River Legend, Swan Lake, Les Biches, and Glen Tetley's Voluntaries.

Johnson stepped down from DTH after a twenty-eight year career, and enrolled as a communications student at Fordham University. She was later hired as the inaugural editor-in-chief of Pointe Magazine, and served in that capacity from 2000 - 2009. Johnson later rejoined the Dance Theatre of Harlem as its artistic director, before her retirement in 2023.
