= Alicia Holloway =

American ballerina and television personality

- Born: August 31, 1996 (age 29); Morgantown, West Virginia, U.S.
- Education: University of North Carolina School of the Arts; School of American Ballet
- Occupations: Ballet dancer, television personality, beauty pageant contestant, social media influencer
- Career
- Current group: Dance Theatre of Harlem
- Former groups: Suzanne Farrell Ballet

Alicia Mae Holloway (born August 31, 1996) is an American ballerina and television personality. Holloway danced as an apprentice with the Suzanne Farrell Ballet before joining the corps de ballet at Dance Theatre of Harlem. She competed in the Miss West Virginia pageant in 2019 and the 25th season of the American dating reality television series The Bachelor in 2020.

== Early life and dance training ==
Holloway was born on August 31, 1996, in Morgantown, West Virginia. She says she is of African-American, Cherokee, and Italian American descent. She was adopted as an infant by a black father and white mother in Morgantown. She was raised in a religious, Christian family.

She began studying dance when she was three years old at the Kate and Company Studio and Morgantown Dance Studio in West Virginia. Holloway went on to attend Central Pennsylvania Youth Ballet and the University of North Carolina School of the Arts's boarding school. From 2011 to 2015, she was enrolled at the School of American Ballet, where she trained under Suki Schorer, Susan Pilarre, Darci Kistler, Kay Mazzo, and Jock Soto. Holloway attended summer dance intensive programs at Boston Ballet and Pacific Northwest Ballet.

== Career ==
=== Ballet ===
Holloway danced for the Suzanne Farrell Ballet in Washington, D.C. as an apprentice. She later joined Dance Theatre of Harlem, where she has danced in ballets by Robert Garland, Elena Kunikova, and Nacho Duato. She has been with Dance Theatre of Harlem for seven seasons. As a dancer, she performed on stage with Aretha Franklin.

In October 2022, Holloway taught ballet in Saint Thomas, U.S. Virgin Islands. In December 2022, she performed, as a guest artist, as the Sugar Plum Fairy with Greensboro Ballet in The Nutcracker.

In 2023, she was featured, in ballet costume, on the cover of People's Health Issue for Winter/Spring 2023.

=== Pageant and television ===
In 2018, Holloway competed in, and won, the 2019 Miss Tri-State Pageant. In 2019, Holloway competed in the Miss West Virginia beauty pageant.

In 2020, Holloway joined the cast of the American dating reality television series The Bachelor in the show's 25th season. She was the first professional ballerina to ever compete on the show. She was eliminated after the first week.

== Personal life ==
Holloway has asthma.

She is a TikToker and Instagramer, and went viral after posting a video about the relationship between her adoptive mother and birth mother. She also went viral for a series of videos she made about a potential stalker attempting to break into her hotel room.

After competing on The Bachelor, Holloway was in a relationship with Juan Matallana.
