= Gayle McKinney-Griffith =

American dancer

Gayle McKinney-Griffith (August 26, 1949 - October 11, 2023) was an American dancer. She was a founding dancer of the Dance Theater of Harlem.
