= Llanchie Stevenson =

American ballet dancer

- Born: Rosemary Llanchie Stevenson
- Education: Fiorello H. LaGuardia High School; School of American Ballet
- Occupation: Ballet dancer
- Dancing career
- Former groups: Alvin Ailey American Dance Theater; Radio City Music Hall Ballet Company; National Ballet of Washington; Dance Theatre of Harlem

Aminah L. Ahmad (born Rosemary Llanchie Stevenson), formerly known professionally as Llanchie Stevenson, is an American ballet dancer who was the first African-American dancer at Radio City Music Hall Ballet Company, the first African-American female dancer at the National Ballet of Washington, and an original company member and former principal dancer with Dance Theatre of Harlem. She retired from dancing upon her conversion to Islam.

== Dance training ==
Rosemary Llanchie Stevenson began her dance training at the Bernice Johnson Dance Studio. She enrolled at Fiorello H. LaGuardia High School of Music & Art and Performing Arts as a dance major with an emphasis on classical ballet but was dissuaded from continuing classical dance training due to her race, and was switched over to modern dance studies. Her father complained about the change, as Stevenson wanted to become a professional ballet dancer, and she was put back in her classical studies.

== Career ==
After graduating from LaGuardia when she was seventeen years old she took a class at Alvin Ailey American Dance Theater. She was noticed by Alvin Ailey and he invited her to join the professional company. She toured with Alvin Ailey American Dance Theater as a modern dancer, but kept up her ballet and pointe training, upon Ailey's insistence. Ailey encouraged Stevenson to audition for the ballet company at Radio City Music Hall. She auditioned and was told to work on her fouettés and come back in two weeks. She auditioned again and was accepted, joining the Radio City Music Hall Ballet Company as its first African-American dancer. Due to her race, original roles were created for her as there weren't many roles within classical ballets that were traditionally for black dancers.

Stevenson left Radio City Music Hall and auditioned to be a student at the School of American Ballet with hopes of joining the New York City Ballet. She was accepted and received a scholarship to study at the school. She was a student at the School of American Ballet for two years but was not offered a position in the company, despite many of her classmates joining. She asked George Balanchine, director of the School of American Ballet and New York City Ballet, what her prospects were for dancing professionally. Balanchine expressed that although Arthur Mitchell, an African-American male dancer, was dancing with New York City Ballet, the company was not ready to have a woman of color, stating that a black woman would "break the corps line."

Stevenson later auditioned for Frederic Franklin's National Ballet of Washington and was accepted as a member of the corps de ballet. She was the only African-American dancer in the company at the time she joined. After dancing in the corps at the National Ballet of Washington for a few years, she was contacted by Arthur Mitchell, who had retired from New York City Ballet and founded Dance Theatre of Harlem, to join his company. She joined Dance Theatre of Harlem as a founding member and was the company's first principal dancer. She danced many principal roles at Dance Theatre of Harlem, including one of the lead roles in Balanchine's Concerto Barocco. She toured with the company and even performed at Jacob's Pillow Dance. While at Dance Theatre of Harlem, Stevenson wore brown tights over her pink tights, paving the way for ballet dancers of color to start wearing brown tights and pointe shoes, breaking from the tradition of pink tights and shoes.

== Conversion and retirement ==
Stevenson began feeling discouraged after she stopped being cast in roles she wanted at Dance Theatre of Harlem despite being a principal dancer, believing the cause to be her weight. She began reading the book How to Eat to Live by Elijah Muhammad to help her lose weight and was inspired by the book's messages about Islam. She lost weight and began receiving desired roles again at Dance Theatre of Harlem. After reading about Allah in Muhammad's book, she decided to attend Nation of Islam meetings. She identified with many teaches and practices of the Nation of Islam and officially converted from Christianity to Islam, changing her name to Aminah. She and her husband practiced Islam through the Nation of Islam, but later left the Nation and joined mainstream Islam.

Due to traditional Islamic teachings forbidding women to perform in front of men, perform in public, and dancing uncovered, Stevenson decided to retire from ballet. After retiring she taught ballet and gymnastics to Muslim girls with the focus on discipline and physical health, not with the intention of pre-professional training.
