= Chyrstyn Fentroy =

American ballet dancer

Chyrstyn Mariah Fentroy is an American ballet dancer. She currently dances as a principal dancer with the Royal Swedish Ballet. She was previously a principal dancer with the Boston Ballet and the Dance Theatre of Harlem. When Fentroy joined Boston Ballet in 2017, she was the first African-American female dancer to join the company in a decade.

== Early life ==
Fentroy grew up in Los Angeles, California. Both of her parents had been professional dancers; her father coached a dance team in hip-hop and jazz, while her mother, Ruth Fentroy, trained in classical ballet. Her mother is white and her father is black. She began her ballet training under her mother at the Peninsula School of Performance Arts in Palos Verdes, California.

When Fentroy was 17 years old, she moved to New York City and trained as a scholarship student at the Joffrey Ballet. As a student, she gained touring experience with the Joffrey Ballet Concert Group.

During her time with the Joffrey Ballet, Fentroy competed in the Youth America Grand Prix finals (2010), as well as the Beijing International Ballet and Choreography Competition (2011).

== Career ==
Upon graduating from the Joffrey Ballet, Fentroy joined Dance Theatre of Harlem, which was founded for Black dancers during the civil rights movement. She later became a principal dancer under the direction of Virginia Johnson. In her five years with the company, Fentroy performed in Austria, Honduras, Italy, Israel, and Turkey. She also had lead roles in Alvin Ailey's The Lark Ascending, George Balanchine's Agon and Tchaikovsky Pas de Deux, Ulysses Dove's Dancing on the Front Porch of Heaven, Nacho Duato's Coming Together, DIane McIntyre's Change, Helen Pickett's When Love, and Glen Tetley's Dialogues. Fentroy received praise from New York Times dance critic Brian Seibert for her performance in Moultrie's dance "Vessels."

Fentroy was featured on the January 2015 cover of Dance Magazine as one of the "25 to Watch." The following year, she was awarded the Princess Grace Honoraria Award in Dance. In 2018, WBUR recognized Fentroy as one of their "Artery 25," which recognizes influential artists of color in the Boston area.

Restless with the lack of growth opportunities at the Dance Theatre of Harlem, Fentroy joined the Boston Ballet in 2017, becoming the first African-American female dancer in the company in a decade. As a member of the corps de ballet for "Chaconne," Fentroy faced the racism in ballet head-on when she had to hide her natural hair; this experience began a journey toward activism in ballet.

She was promoted to second soloist in 2018 and to soloist in 2019. In her time with the Boston Ballet, Fentroy has received praise from choreographers and critics, including the New York Times' Brian Siebert.

To counteract racism in ballet, Fentroy has worked with the Boston Ballet to highlight dancers of color and help young and aspiring dancer of color to pursue dance professionally. In one effort, she has hosted series of open house mentorship programs in partnership with The International Association of Blacks in Dance.

Fentroy has also written and contributed to articles for dance blogs and magazines. In 2018, she contributed to Jai-Dee Dancewear's blog, wherein she wrote her perspectives on many aspects of her life as a Black ballet dancer. In 2020, she wrote an article entitled "My Experience as a Black Ballerina in a World of Implicit Bias" for Pointe, wherein she highlighted the "Eurocentric history of extreme racial discrimination and elitism" in the ballet world.
