= Lorraine Graves =

American ballerina (1957–2024)

Lorraine Elizabeth Graves
- Born: 5 October 1957; Norfolk, Virginia
- Died: 21 March 2024 (aged 66)
- Education: Lake Taylor High School; Indiana University Bloomington
- Height: 5 ft 10 in (178 cm)
- Career
- Former groups: Dance Theatre of Harlem
- Dances: Ballet

Lorraine Elizabeth Graves (5 October 1957 – 21 March 2024) was an American ballerina and teacher.

== Early life and education ==
Graves was born in Norfolk, Virginia to Tommy E. Graves Jr., the founder of Graves Funeral Home, and Mildred Odom Graves, a school teacher. She began ballet training at the age of eight after being exposed to televised performances. She was the first African American student at a local ballet academy, Academy of the Norfolk Ballet.

Graves received her early education from the Lake Taylor High School. She earned a bachelor's degree in ballet from Indiana University Bloomington in three years, graduating a year early.

== Career ==
Upon moving to New York City, Graves joined the Dance Theatre of Harlem and quickly became a principal dancer. Her notable performances included roles in a Creole version of Giselle set in Louisiana, Stravinsky's Firebird, and Balanchine's The Four Temperaments. Graves was known for her commanding stage presence and technical skill. After her performing career, Graves served as the ballet mistress of the Dance Theatre of Harlem, assisting the artistic director in preparing dancers for performances.

Graves retired from performing in 1996 due to a lupus diagnosis but continued teaching ballet at the Governor's School for the Arts in Virginia for over 20 years.
