= Robert Garland (choreographer) =

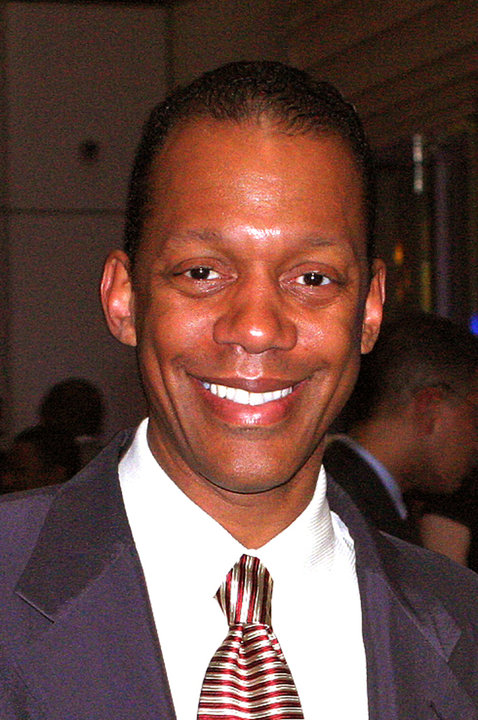
- Robert Garland, 2011
- Born: Philadelphia, Pennsylvania, U.S.
- Education: Juilliard School
- Occupations: dancer, choreographer

Robert Garland is the artistic director of the Dance Theatre of Harlem, where he was a principal dancer and their first official resident choreographer. He has also choreographed for the New York City Ballet, The Royal Ballet, San Francisco Ballet, and the Oakland Ballet, among many others.

== Early life and education ==
Born in Philadelphia, Pennsylvania, Garland began his dance training with John Hines at the Philadelphia High School for Creative and Performing Arts, commonly known as CAPA on the Avenue of the Arts in South Philadelphia. While there, he studied all forms of dance under the tutelage of a variety of instructors, including John Hines, Marion Cuyjet, Morton Winston, and guest teachers from the Dance Theatre of Harlem company, and the Alvin Ailey American Dance Theater. He also studied at the School for The Pennsylvania Ballet.

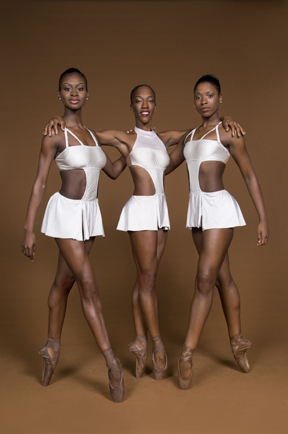
Paunika Jones, Ashley Murphy, and Cira Robinson in Robert Garland's "Return"

At fifteen years of age, Robert joined The Philadelphia Dance Company (Philadanco), under the direction of Joan Myers Brown, as its youngest member. During his tenure with the company, while still in high school, he worked with choreographers Billy Wilson, Talley Beatty and others. It was here that he received his first of George Balanchine’s neo-classical style, through works choreographed for Philadanco by founding members of the New York City Ballet, William Dollar and Roy Tobias.

Upon graduation from high school, he moved to New York City to attend the Juilliard School, where he received his Bachelor of Fine Arts degree in 1983. Through a four-year scholarship, he studied with, and performed works by, choreographers Antony Tudor, Paul Taylor, José Limón, Anna Sokolow, Kazuko Hirabayashi, Alfredo Corvino, and Hector Zaraspe. It was during this time he also performed with Tina Ramirez’s Ballet Hispánico.

== Career ==
=== Dance Theatre of Harlem ===
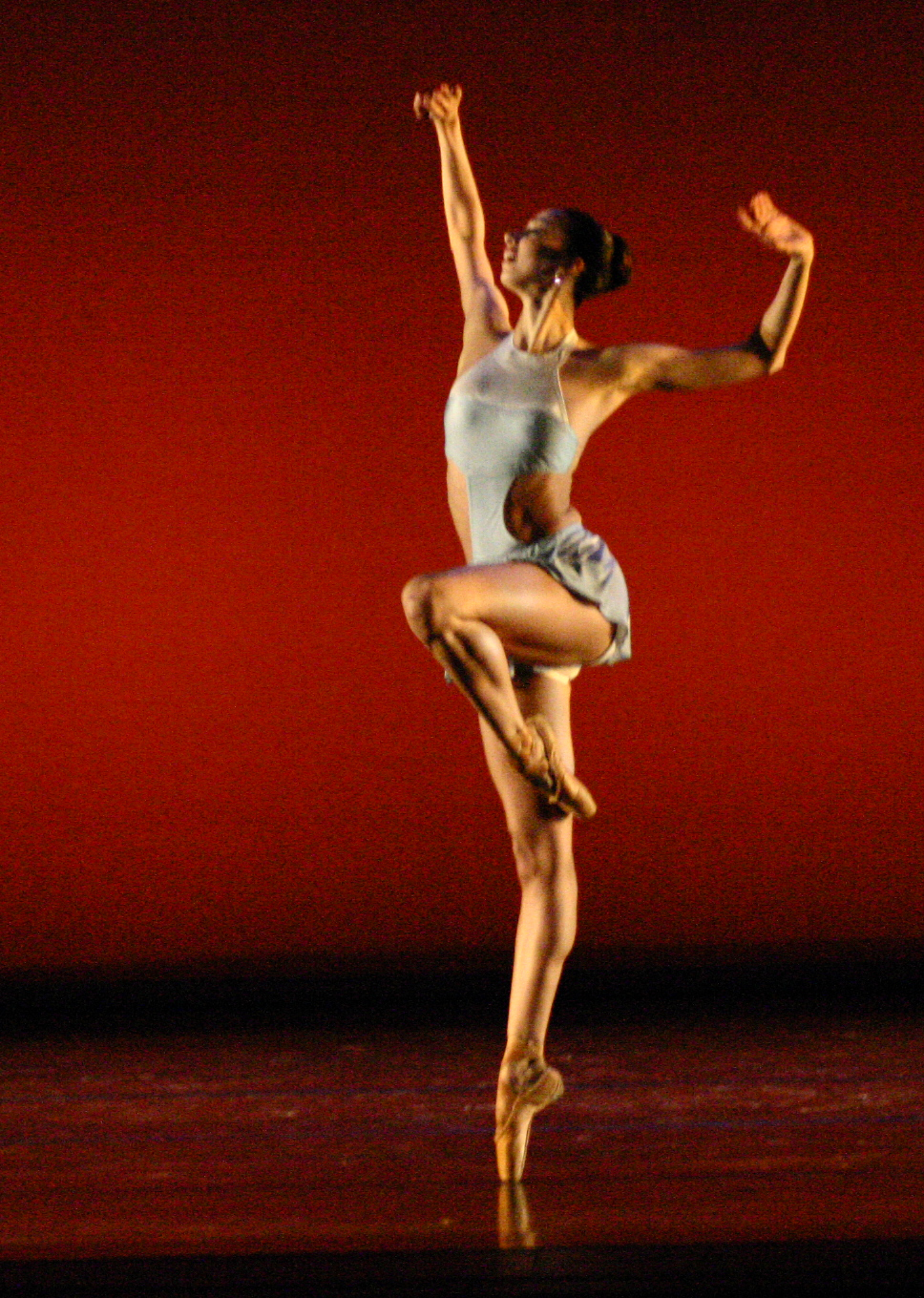
Alicia Graf in Robert Garland's "Return"

After graduation from Juilliard, he joined the Dance Theatre of Harlem as an apprentice. Under the tutelage of Arthur Mitchell, Dance Theatre of Harlem's founder and artistic director, he rose through the ranks to become a principal dancer, featured in a wide variety of roles and repertory, including George Balanchine (The Four Temperaments, Agon, Serenade, Allegro Brillante), Jerome Robbins (Opus Jazz, Fancy Free), Garth Fagan (Footprints Dressed in Red), Alvin Ailey (The River), Alonzo King (Signs and Wonders), and Billy Wilson (Concerto in F).

After creating a work for the Dance Theatre of Harlem School Ensemble, Mitchell invited Garland to create a work for the Dance Theatre of Harlem Company. Upon Mitchell's retirement from the stage, Garland was appointed by him to run the Dance Theatre of Harlem School, and also became the organization’s first resident choreographer.

In 2022, he was named as the new artistic director of Dance Theatre of Harlem, replacing Virginia Johnson.

=== Work outside of Dance Theatre of Harlem ===
He has set new and established works for New York City Ballet, Oakland Ballet, and others. He is the first Black choreographer to create a work for The Royal Ballet of London. In London, two of his works were chosen by the Telegraph newspaper among the "Top Ten Dance Events" of the London dance season.

His commercial work has included music videos, commercials and short films, including the children’s television show Sesame Street, a Nike commercial, featuring New York Yankees Derek Jeter, the NAACP Image Awards, a short film for designer Donna Karan, and the “Charmin Cha-Cha” for Procter & Gamble.

He has worked for Angelo Ellerbee’s PR firm Double XXposure Firm. A highlight during this time was his work as the personal coach for R&B singer Jaheim for his song and video "Just In Case" from his debut album. It ended up being a platinum success. It has sold over 1,000,000 copies.

Garland is a recipient of the Building Brick Award from the New York Chapter of the National Urban League, and is a member of the historic Abyssinian Baptist Church in Harlem, where Calvin O. Butts III is pastor. For the church Garland choreographed a tribute for Butts, a one-time only performance for Abyssinian’s White Tie Gala in November 2009, celebrating the church’s 200th Anniversary.

From 2004 to 2011, Garland was the primary instructor for the Kennedy Center – Dance Theatre of Harlem Residency Program in Washington, D.C.

Recently he choreographed a work for Misty Copeland, performed by her and her partner Matthew Prescott, appearing at the Vail International Dance Festival, and the Gala of Stars in Cincinnati, Ohio.

Garland has also taught for the Alvin Ailey American Dance Theater Company and Ailey II, and recently created a work for the sophomores of the Alvin Ailey\Fordham University Program.

For San Francisco Ballet's 2023 next@90 festival, Garland choreographed a piece set to Mozart's Haffner Serenade with a mix of classical and West African-influenced steps. Former SF Ballet artistic director Helgi Tomasson contacted Garland after seeing a New York Times article about institutional racism in the dance world where Garland was quoted and asked him to create a piece for SF Ballet.

== Personal life ==
Robert Garland has two sisters: Lana Garland, a film writer and producer, and Robin Kim Garland Bandura, a physical therapist.

== See also ==
- Category:Ballets by Robert Garland
