= Felia Doubrovska =

Russian dancer and teacher (1896–1981)

- Born: Felizata Dlouzhnevska; February 13, 1896; St. Petersburg, Russian Empire
- Died: September 18, 1981 (aged 85); Manhattan, New York, United States

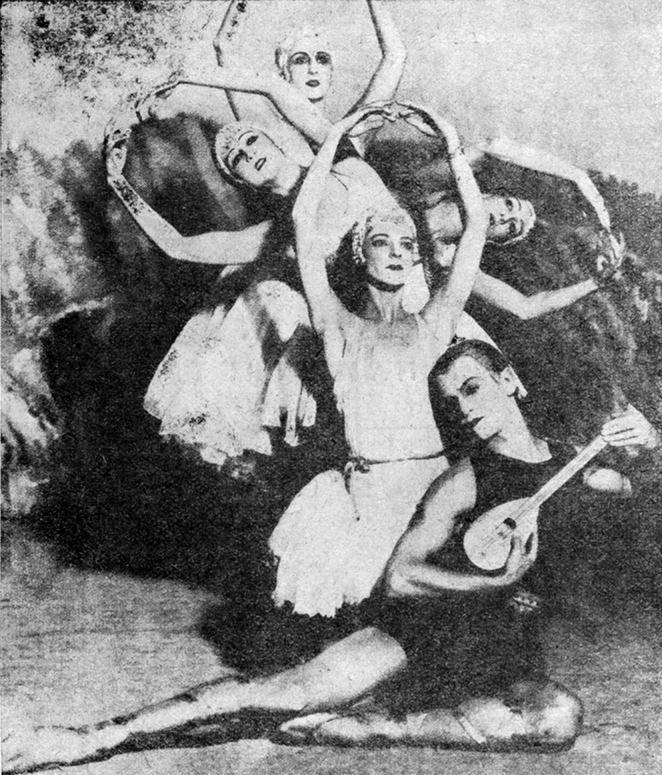
Apollo 1928

Felia Doubrovska (Russian: Фелия Дубровская (real name Фелицата Леонтьевна Длужневская); born as Felizata Dlouzhnevska in St Petersburg, February 13, 1896 – d. Manhattan, September 18, 1981) was a Russian dancer and teacher.

Doubrovska graduated at the Imperial Ballet School in 1913, was member of the Mariinsky Theatre company, and emigrated with her later husband Pierre Vladimiroff to the West in 1920, where they joined at first the Ballets Russes. Amongst others, she danced in the company at New York's Metropolitan Opera from 1938 to 1939, and taught at School of American Ballet until the age of 84. She died due to a heart attack.

Virginia Brooks, Vice-président Board of Directors of Dance Film Association in USA, created a film Felia Doubrovska remembered (Happy to be so...), 2008, dedicated to the memory ballerina Felia Doubrovska.

== See also ==
- List of Russian ballet dancers
