= Pointe (magazine) =

Ballet magazine

- August/September 2011 cover: Adji Cissoko
- Editor: Amy Brandt
- Frequency: Quarterly
- Founded: 2000; 26 years ago
- Final issue: Fall 2020 (final print issue)
- Company: DanceMedia
- Country: United States
- Based in: New York City, New York, U.S.
- Language: English
- Website: www.pointemagazine.com
- ISSN: 1529-6741

Pointe is a quarterly magazine that was launched in 2000. It is an international ballet magazine and was converted from print to a digital magazine in 2020. The magazine covers news on ballet company premieres, established and rising ballet stars, ballet competition results, career and training advice as well as guides for pre-professional training programs and dance higher education programs. As part of Dance Media, Pointe is a sister publication to Dance Magazine, Dance Spirit, Dance Teacher, and The Dance Edit.

Founded by Michael Weiskopf and first published in 2000, Pointe, focuses on an audience of aspiring and professional dancers. Virginia Johnson, a founding member of Dance Theatre of Harlem and principal dancer with that company for 28 years, was the founding editor of Pointe. She led the magazine until 2009, after which she rejoined Dance Theatre of Harlem as artistic director. Hannah Rubin was Pointe’s editor from 2009–14. Amy Brandt, a former professional dancer, has been Pointe’s editor in chief since 2014; she was previously an associate editor for Dance Teacher and Dance Magazine and has written Pointe’s “Ask Amy” column since 2009. Joanna Harp, part of the founding team of Pointe, is Dance Media’s current president.

Macfadden Performing Arts Media acquired Pointe and its parent company, Lifestyle Media, Inc in 2006. The magazine was subsequently sold to Frederic M. Seegal, an investment banker with Peter J. Solomon Company, in 2016. Pointe (as part of Dance Media) was acquired by Hollywood.com in January 2023.
