= Virginia Wales Johnson =

American novelist

Virginia Wales Johnson (28 December 1849, in Brooklyn, New York – 16 January 1916) was a United States novelist.

Her parents were from Boston, and she was home schooled. After 1875 she lived in Florence, Italy.

== Works ==
Her early publications were mainly for young people. She later wrote fiction for adults. Her works include:

- Kettle Club Series (1870)
- Travels of an American Owl (1870)
- Joseph the Jew (1873)
- A Sack of Gold (1874)
- The Catskill Fairies (1875)
- The Calderwood Secret (1875)
- A Foreign Marriage (1880)
- The Neptune Vase (1881) — "her finest work" — 1920 Encyclopedia Americana
- The Famalls of Tipton (1885)
- Tulip's Place (1886)
- Miss Nancy's Pilgrimage (1887)
- The House of the Musician (1887)
- Lake Como: a World's Shrine, on Como, Italy (1902) at archive.org
- A Lift on the Road (1913)

=== Descriptive works ===
- The Lily of the Arno, or, Florence, Past and Present (1891)
- Genoa the Superb, the City of Columbus (1892)
- Many Years of a Florence Balcony (1911)
