= Oakland Ballet =

Ballet company based in Oakland, California

Coordinates: 37.8111°N 122.2671°W

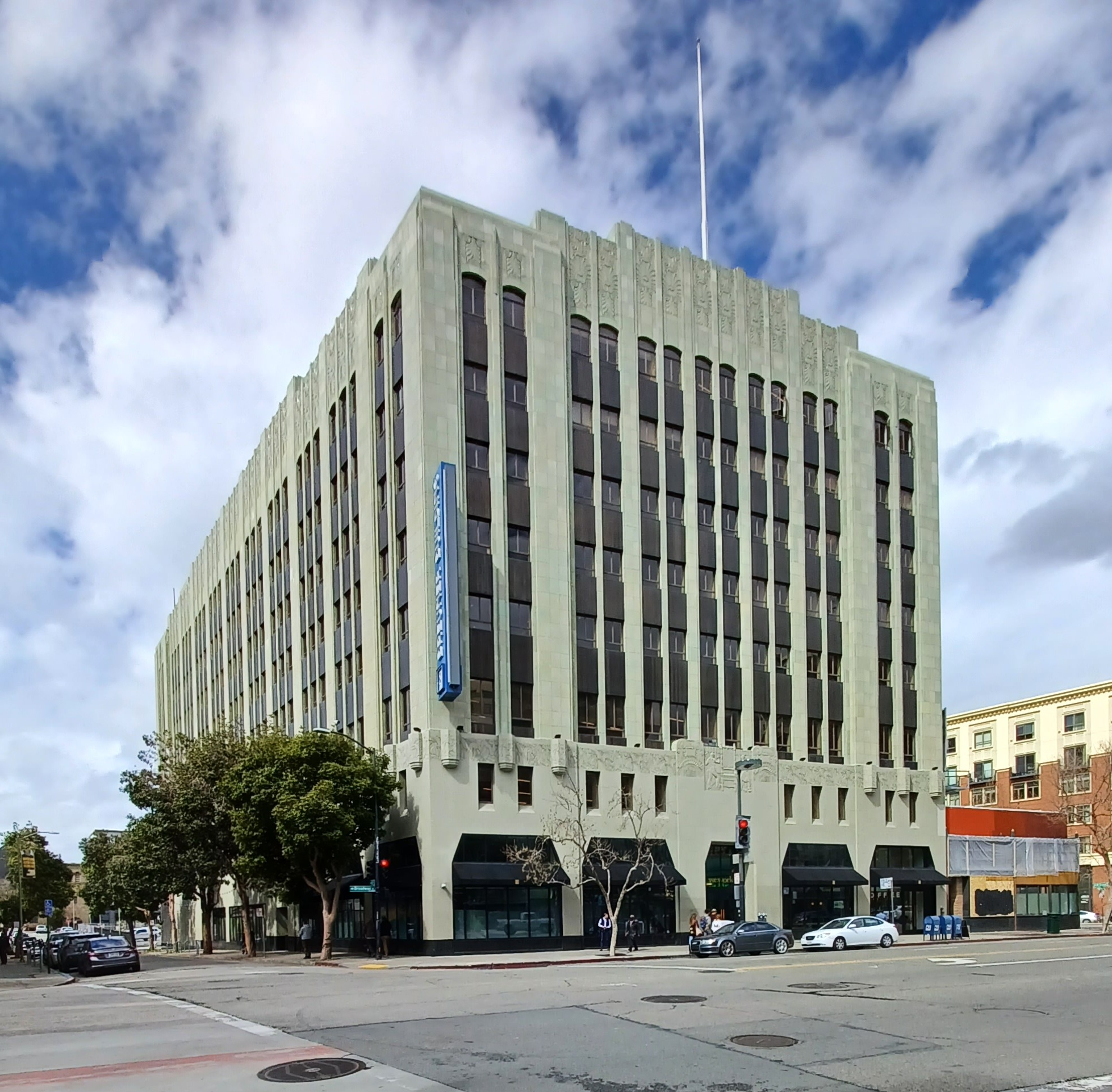
Oakland Balley Company's headquarters on Broadway, Oakland

The Oakland Ballet Company is a non-profit ballet company based in Oakland, California. OBC was founded in 1965 by Ronn Guidi, an Oakland native, and gained recognition through its historical reconstructions of ballets from the Ballets Russes of Serge Diaghilev; the mounting of classic works of Americana; and the creation of innovative contemporary choreography.

Noted revivals by Oakland Ballet include works by choreographers Kurt Jooss, Michel Fokine, Charles Weidman, and Antony Tudor and the first re-staging of works by Bronislava Nijinska in the United States. Championing American masterpieces as well, Oakland Ballet has presented Eugene Loring's "Billy the Kid", Ruthanna Boris's "Cakewalk", and Agnes de Mille's "Fall River Legend". Along with Guidi's own repertoire of choreography, Oakland Ballet has produced works by local choreographers such as Val Caniparoli, Carlos Carvajal, Margaret Jenkins, Alonzo King, Michael Lowe, Robert Moses, and Amy Seiwert, among others.

In 2000, Oakland Ballet ushered in a new Artist Director, Dance Theatre of Harlem dancer, Karen Brown. Founding Artistic Director Ronn Guidi retired for the final time in 2008 and Oakland Ballet continued to present productions under the direction of guest Artistic Directors through the spring of 2010.

Since his appointment as Artistic Director of Oakland Ballet Company in 2010, Graham Lustig has presented five seasons of his Nutcracker and three spring repertory productions, Forwards! (2011), Diaghilev Imagery (2013), and Oakland-esque (2014), with a focus on commissioned works by Bay Area choreographers. Lustig’s ballet Infinitum was included in the West Wave Dance Festival (2011) and he initiated Oakland Ballet Company’s annual summer Ballet Boot Camp, a two-week dance and choreography workshop now in its fifth year, as well as ongoing ballet training opportunities at The Academy at Oakland Ballet Company. Lustig also been instrumental in reviving Oakland Ballet’s role in arts education in the East Bay, establishing OBC’s current “Discover Dance” community outreach program.

== Repertoire ==
Title	Choreographer	Oakland Ballet Premiere	Staged By
Billy the Kid	Eugene Loring	1976	Eugene Loring
Spectre de la Rose		1976	Anatole Vilzak
Coppelia		1977	Ann Jenner of The Royal Ballet
The Sisters		1977	Eugene Loring
The Tender Land	Eugene Loring	1978 (World Premiere)	
La Boutique Fantasque	Leonide Massine	1978	Leonide Massine
Le Soleil de Nuit (The Snow Maiden)	Leonide Massine	1979	Leonide Massine
Scheherazade	Fokine	1979	Nicolas Beriosoff
Time unto Time	Eugene Loring	1980 (World Premiere)	
Rooms	Anna Sokolow	1980	Anna Sokolow
Les Noces	Bronislava Nijinska	1981	Irina Nijinska (daughter)
Les Biches	Bronislava Nijinska	1982	Irina Nijinska (daughter)
Polovestian Dances	Fokine	1982	Freddie Franklin
Cakewalk	Ruthanna Boris	1983	Ruthanna Boris
Inconsequentials	Agnes DeMille	1983	Ilene Strickler
Crystal Slipper	Carlos Carvajal	1983	Carlos Carvajal
The Green Table	Kurt Joos	1984	Anna Markard (daughter)
Lynchtown	Charles Weidman	1985	Sheila Xoregos
Fall River Legend	Agnes DeMille	1986	Enrique Martinez
Brahms Waltzes	Charles Weidman	1986	Sheila Xoregos
Giselle		1987	Freddie Franklin
Lilac Garden	Antony Tudor	1988	Sallie Wilson
Petroushka		1990	Nicolais Beriosoff
Echoing of Trumpets	Antony Tudor	1990	Viveka Ljung
Dark Elegies	Antony Tudor	1991	
Gavotte Pavlova	Pavlova	1992	Frank Reis
Grand pas de deux	Pavlova	1992	Frank Reis
The Fairy Doll	Pavlova	1992	Frank Reis
Gaite Parisienne	Massine	1994	Freddie Franklin
Romeo and Juliet	Ronn Guidi	1994	
Boléro	Nijinska	1995	Nina Yousekevitch
Afternoon of a Faun	Nijinsky	1995	Jill Beck, Ann Hutchinson and Claudia Jeschke
The Secret Garden	Ronn Guidi	1996	
