= National Ballet of Washington, D.C. =

The National Ballet of Washington, D.C. was an American national ballet company founded in 1962 by Jean Riddell, granddaughter of the founder of PET Evaporated Milk and artistic director Frederic Franklin, with financial support from the Ford Foundation. Its studios were located at 2801 Connecticut Avenue, NW, in Washington, D.C.

The company debuted on January 3, 1962, at the George Washington University Lisner Auditorium, changed residency upon the opening of the John F. Kennedy Center for the Performing Arts in 1972, and officially ended on June 13, 1974.

The National Ballet brought ballet to every state in the United States but two, and also performed in Canada and Mexico.

Ben Stevenson OBE was co-artistic director from 1971 to 1974.

== History ==
In 1958, Frederic Franklin was appointed co-director of the Washington Ballet by its founder, Mary Day. Franklin choreographed two original works – Etalage to music by Franz Liszt and Homage au Ballet with music by Charles-François Gounod – for the Washington Ballet. In 1960, Franklin said in an interview, "We are working towards a resident company in the nation's capital." He resigned in April 1961 after a dispute over the future direction of the company.

The National Ballet of Washington, D.C., was co-founded in 1962 by Jean Riddell, chairman of the board of the Washington Ballet Guild and a committed patron of the arts, and Frederic Franklin, artistic director, with financial assistance from the Ford Foundation. Mrs. Riddell was named president of its sustaining organization, the National Ballet Society. Franklin and Riddell also created the National Ballet School with an enrollment of 250 girls and boys with class size limited to 15 students.

Franklin said: "The school and the company are for America and for all the good dancers that we can find and develop. Our intention is to establish a national company in the nation's capital based on artistic policies similar to those of the New York City Ballet and the original policy of the Sadler's Wells Ballet." Riddell said, "The National Ballet is the only logical name for this company – it's designed not only for Washington, but also for growth."

After three months of rehearsal, the company debuted on January 3, 1962, at the George Washington University Lisner Auditorium, with New York City Ballet co-founder and choreographer George Balanchine in the audience. The company received 13 curtain calls.

== Dancers ==
Principal dancers included Sonia Arova, Alida Belair, Marilyn Burr, Eugene Collins, Jean-Paul Comelin, Ivan Dragadze, Roderick Drew, Anita Dyche, Stevan Grebel (1965–1971), Daniel Franck, Jacqueline Hepner, Claudine Kamoun, Desmond Kelly, Christine Knoblauch, Michelle Lees, Roni Mahler, Carmen Mathe, Kevin McKenzie, Yvonne Meyer, Ivan Nagy, Kirk Peterson, Dennis Poole, Stuart Sebastion, Andrea Vodehnal.

Soloists included James Capp, Roy Gean, Helen Heineman, Judith Helman, Hiller Huhn, Linda Kintz, James Maher, Lucy Maybury, Patricia Mideke, Jane Miller, Judith Reese, Judy Rhodes, Judith Rigler, Ilona Russell, Thomas Russell, Christine Spizzo, Frederic Strobel, James Thompson, Franklin Yezer.

Corps de Ballet included Mariana Alvarez, Charlotte Belcher, Roger Bigelow, Phyllis Blake, Karen Brown, Nancy Davis, Evelyn Ebel, Susan Frazer, Susan Gore, Katherine Laqueur, Maxine Mahon, Sheryl McKechnie, Andrea Price, Betty Risen, Susan Smith, Patricia Sorrell, Llanchie Stevenson, and James Thompson.

Guest artists included Dame Margot Fonteyn of the Royal Ballet, and Violette Verdy, Patricia McBride and Edward Villella of the New York City Ballet. Other guest artists included Gaye Fulton of the Zurich Ballet Company, Fleming Flint of the Paris Opera Ballet, and Seija Simonen of the Helsinki Dance Company of Finland.

The first graduates of the National Ballet School to be accepted into the company were Sheryl McKechnie, Judy Rhodes and Betty Risen.

== Staff ==
Ralph Black, former manager of the National Symphony Orchestra was General Manager. Oleg Tupine was the Ballet Master. Ottavio DeRosa was Principal Conductor. James McInnes was Associate Conductor. James Gamble was Stage Manager. May Ishimoto was costumer.

== Repertoire ==
The repertoire of the National Ballet of Washington, D.C., included Swan Lake, The Nutcracker, Giselle, Les Sylphides, La Sylphide, Coppelia Con Amore, Homage au ballet, Raymonda Pas de dix, Sylvia Pas de deux, Bachianas Brasileiras, Tribute, Legend of the Pearl, Night Song, The Four Temperaments, La sonnambula (Balanchine), Othello, Danse Brilliante, Le Combat, and Serenade.
