= Karel Shook =

American ballet master, choreographer and writer

Karel Shook (August 8, 1920 – July 25, 1985) was an American ballet master, choreographer and writer. He was asked to join the Dance Theatre of Harlem. The Dance Theater of Harlem was formed by Arthur Mitchell, Cicely Tyson and Brock Peters.

He was born in Renton, Washington. Shook was a child actor in the Seattle Repertory Theatre. He was awarded a scholarship to the Cornish College of the Arts at the age of 13; there, he was encouraged by founder Nellie Cornish to study ballet. Soon afterwards, he danced with the Ballet Russe de Monte-Carlo for several seasons and performed in Broadway musicals. He danced with the New York City Ballet in 1949. In 1952, he became a member of the faculty of the Katherine Dunham School of Dance; after that school closed in 1954, he opened his own school. He joined the faculty of the June Taylor School in 1957. In 1959, he became teacher at the Dutch National Ballet; he later became ballet master for the company. In 1968, with Arthur Mitchell, he founded the Dance Theatre of Harlem.

His students included Arthur Mitchell, Alvin Ailey, Carmen de Lavallade and Geoffrey Holder.

He published a number of works including:

- Elements of Classical Ballet Technique (1977)
- Beyond the Mist, a collection of poetry

Shook developed choreography for performance on stage, opera, film and television.

In 1980, he received a presidential award for education.

Shook died at home in Englewood, New Jersey at the age of 64.
