= Agon (ballet) =

1953–1957 ballet by Igor Stravinsky

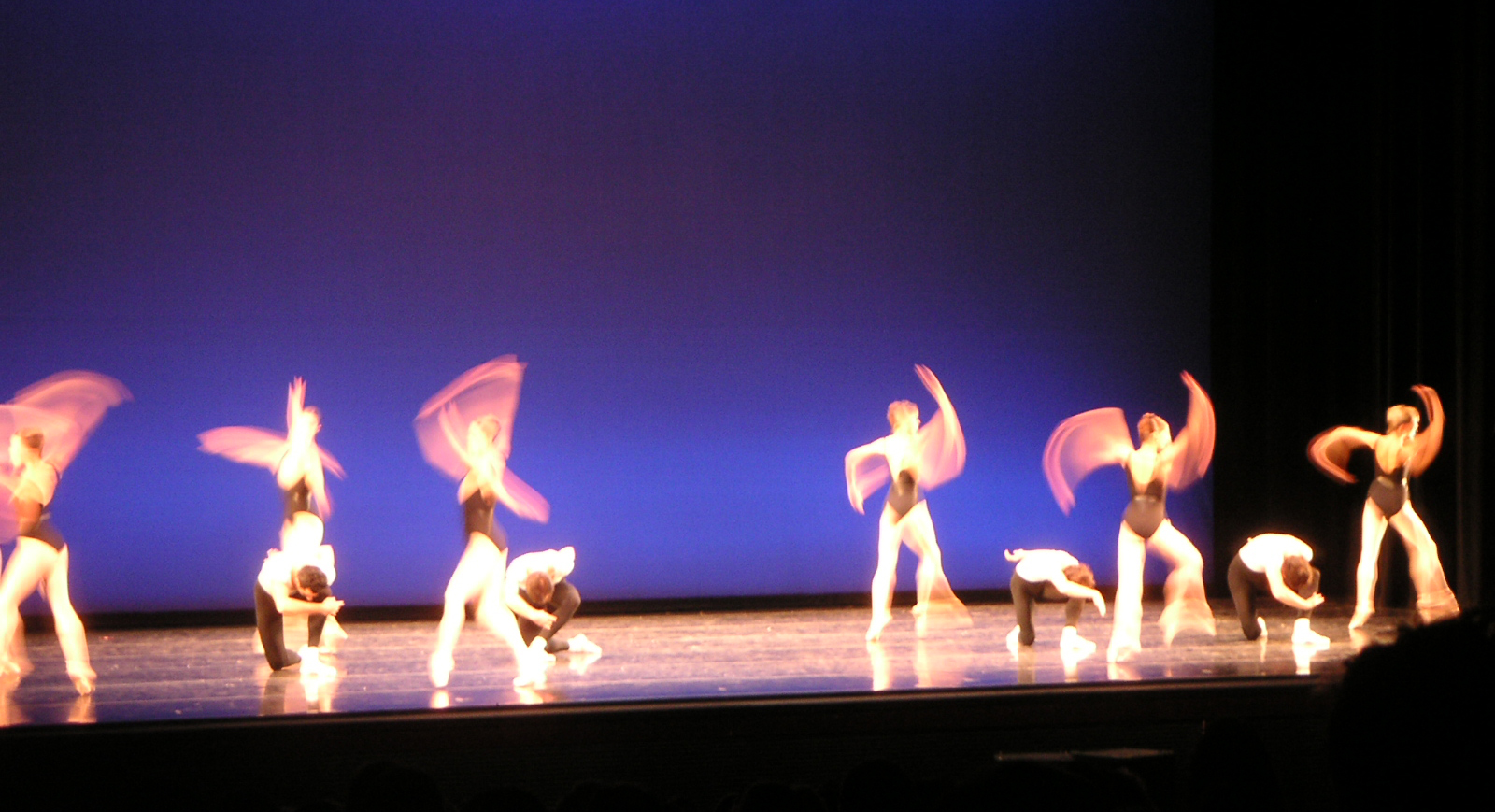
- Agon performed by Carolina Ballet in 2005
- Choreographer: George Balanchine
- Music: Igor Stravinsky
- Premiere: December 1, 1957; City Center of Music and Drama, New York
- Original ballet company: New York City Ballet
- Type: Classical ballet

Agon is a 25-minute ballet for twelve dancers, with music by Igor Stravinsky and choreography by George Balanchine. It was recognized as a landmark at its premiere and has continued to be regarded as such ever since.

The score was commissioned by the New York City Ballet. Stravinsky began composition in December 1953 but was interrupted the next year; he resumed work in 1956 and concluded on April 27, 1957. The music was premiered in Los Angeles at UCLA's Royce Hall on June 17, 1957, conducted by Robert Craft. Stravinsky himself conducted the sessions for the work's first recording the following day. Agon was first performed on stage by the City Ballet at the City Center of Music and Drama on November 27, 1957.

The composition's long gestation period covers an interesting juncture in Stravinsky's composing career, in which he moved from a diatonic musical idiom to one based on twelve-tone technique; the score thus demonstrates a unique symbiosis of musical idioms. The work's title, agon, is a Greek word that means “contest," “protagonist," “anguish” or “struggle." The ballet has no story, but consists of a series of dance movements in which various groups of dancers interact in pairs, trios, quartets, etc. A number of the movements are based on 17th-century French court dances – saraband, galliard and bransle.

Agon was immediately hailed as a groundbreaking triumph. John Martin in The New York Times described the choreography as "complex, ingenious and fantastically off the beaten path formally," and the music as "a marvelous piece of consistent construction." Edwin Denby, writing a short while after the premiere, reported that the work had been "given an enormous ovation last winter by the opening-night audience. The balcony stood up shouting and whistling when the choreographer took his bow. Downstairs, people came out into the lobby, their eyes bright as if the piece had been champagne. Marcel Duchamp, the painter, said he felt the way he had after the opening of Le Sacre. At later performances, Agon continued to be vehemently applauded." Alastair Macaulay, in a Times article marking the premiere's 50th anniversary, characterized the work as "astounding, full of shapes, phrases, rhythms, sounds that hadn't been encountered before but embodied New York modernism itself.... Arlene Croce, later dance critic of The New Yorker, said she did not sleep for a week." During the years since it was introduced, Agon has remained in the City Ballet repertoire, has been performed all over the world, and is regularly described using language such as "an instant classic," "Balanchine's 1957 masterpiece," and "one of the greatest of Balanchine's achievements."

== Form ==
Stravinsky laid out the ballet in twelve parts, with four large sections each consisting of three dances. A prelude and two interludes occur between the large sections, but this does not fundamentally affect the twelve-part design because their function is caesural and compensatory:

- I.
1. Pas-de-quatre (4 male dancers)
2. Double pas-de-quatre (8 female dancers)
3. Triple pas-de-quatre (4 male + 8 female dancers)
- Prelude
- II. (First pas-de-trois: 1 male, 2 female dancers)
1. Sarabande-step (1 male dancer)
2. Gaillarde (2 female dancers)
3. Coda (1 male, 2 female dancers)
- Interlude
- III. (Second pas-de-trois: 2 male, 1 female dancers)
1. Bransle simple (2 male dancers)
2. Bransle gay (1 female dancer)
3. Bransle double (2 male, 1 female dancers)
- Interlude
- IV.
1. Pas-de-deux (1 male, 1 female dancer)
2. Four Duos (4 male, 4 female dancers)
3. Four Trios (4 male, 8 female dancers)

== Instrumentation ==
Agon is scored for a large orchestra consisting of 3 flutes (3rd doubling piccolo), 2 oboes, English horn, 2 clarinets, bass clarinet, 2 bassoons, contrabassoon, 4 horns, 4 trumpets, 3 trombones (2 tenor, 1 bass), harp, piano, mandolin, timpani, tom-tom, xylophone, castanets, and strings. At no point does the entire orchestra play a tutti. Each section is scored for a different combination of instruments.

== Music ==
This was not the first composition in which Stravinsky employed serial techniques, but it was the first in which he used a twelve-tone row, introduced in the second coda, at bar 185. Earlier in the work, Stravinsky had employed a seventeen-tone row, in bars 104–107, and evidence from the sketches suggests a close relationship between these two rows. The Bransle Double is based on a different twelve-tone series, the hexachords of which are treated independently. Those hexachords first appear separately in the Bransle Simple (for two male dancers) and Bransle Gay (for solo female dancer), and are then combined to form a twelve-tone row in the Bransle Double. These three dances together constitute the second pas-de-trois.

== Original cast ==
- Todd Bolender
- Barbara Milberg
- Barbara Walczak
- Roy Tobias
- Jonathan Watts
- Melissa Hayden
- Diana Adams
- Arthur Mitchell

== Italy ==
When Agon was performed in Italy in 1965, Stravinsky was particularly pleased with the performance of mandolinist Giuseppe Anedda. "Bravo Mandolino!" shouted Stravinsky at Anedda and caught up with him to congratulate him and shake his hand.
