= School of American Ballet =

Location
- New York City; United States; 40°46′27″N 73°59′03″W

Information
- Type: Ballet school
- Established: 1934; 92 years ago
- Campus type: Urban
- Website: sab.org

The School of American Ballet (SAB) is the associate school of the New York City Ballet, a ballet company based at the Lincoln Center for the Performing Arts in New York City. The school trains students from the age of six, with professional vocational ballet training for students aged 11–18. Graduates of the school achieve employment with leading ballet companies worldwide, and in the United States with New York City Ballet, American Ballet Theatre, Boston Ballet, San Francisco Ballet, Miami City Ballet, Pacific Northwest Ballet and Houston Ballet.

== History ==
The school was founded by the Russo-Georgian-born choreographer George Balanchine, and philanthropists Lincoln Kirstein and Edward Warburg in 1934. Balanchine's self- prescribed edict, "But first, a school", is indicative of his adherence to the ideals of the training that was fostered by the Imperial Ballet School where he received his training. He realized that most great dance companies were fed by an academy closely associated with it. This practice afforded scores of dancers, well versed in the specifics of his technique and choreographic style. Among the teachers there were many Russian emigres who fled the Russian Revolution: Pierre Vladimiroff, Felia Doubrovska, Anatole Oboukhoff, Hélène Dudin, Ludmilla Schollar, Antonina Tumkovsky, and Alexandra Danilova. Their intention was to establish a major classical ballet company in America, which would lead to the formation of today's New York City Ballet. The school was formed to train and feed dancers into the company. It opened at 637 Madison Avenue with 32 students on January 2, 1934, and the students first performed that June. Seventy-five years later, the School was awarded the National Medal of Arts by President Barack Obama.

== Program ==
Students are chosen through audition. Children's division auditions for the 2007–08 school year included six-year-olds for the first time; previously, the youngest students were required to turn eight in the year they began their studies. Children in the younger divisions are able to perform in various ballets with the company including George Balanchine's famous The Nutcracker, A Midsummer Night's Dream, Peter Martins's Swan Lake, and The Sleeping Beauty. The most advanced students perform in a workshop at the end of each year where the heads of ballet companies choose several of them to join their companies, including New York City Ballet. This started in 1965, when Alexandra Danilova sought and received approval from Balanchine to produce a spring workshop performance for the students. These workshops have become an important preview for many outstanding dancers.

The school also hosts a summer program, where it selects about 200 dance students from across the country to train for five weeks. This summer program is one of the most selective ballet summer programs in the country.

The Preparatory and Children's divisions conduct their programs in the afternoon and children are able to attend school as usual. Students in the Intermediate and Advanced divisions (ages 14 to 18), due to more rigorous pre-professional training, usually enrol in a virtual high school program or attend either the Professional Performing Arts School or Professional Children's School. The SAB requires all students to complete their high school diploma requirements by the time they graduate.

== Faculty ==
As of January 2024, the faculty of The School of American Ballet includes Jonathan Stafford (artistic director and chair of faculty), Aesha Ash (associate chair of faculty), Dena Abergel, Marika Anderson, Meaghan Dutton-O'Hara, Megan Fairchild, Gonzalo Garcia, Craig Hall, Adam Hendrickson, Arch Higgins, Anthony Huxley, Sterling Hyltin, Katrina Killian (children's division manager), Lauren King, Meagan Mann, Kay Mazzo (former chairman of faculty), Christopher Charles McDaniel, Allen Peiffer (professional placement manager), Suki Schorer (Brown Foundation senior faculty chair), and Andrew Scordato.

== Alumni ==
According to SAB, alumni of the School of American Ballet make up over 90% of New York City Ballet, all but two of the company mem at present. Some alumni include Mary Ellen Moylan, Maria Tallchief, Tanaquil Le Clercq, Francisco Monción, John Clifford, Nicholas Magallanes, Lois Bewley, Jacques d'Amboise, Debra Austin, Margaret Severin-Hansen, SarahAnne Perel, Jillana, Allegra Kent, Arthur Mitchell, Wilhelmina Frankfurt, Patricia McBride, Alicia Holloway, Paul Frame, Peter Frame, Edward Villella, Suzanne Farrell, Kay Mazzo, Kathryn Morgan, Garielle Whittle, Helgi Tomasson, Fernando Bujones, Gelsey Kirkland, Heather Watts, Merrill Ashley, Lourdes Lopez, Jock Soto, Peter Boal, Olivia Boisson, Alexandra Waterbury, Victoria Rowell, Kyra Nichols, Darci Kistler, Patrick Bissell, Damian Woetzel, Ethan Stiefel, Wendy Whelan, Alan Bergman, Llanchie Stevenson, George Lee, Sarah Hay, Arlene Shuler, and Paloma Herrera as well as celebrities Sean Young, Ansel Elgort, Ashlee Simpson, Gregori Lukas, Macaulay Culkin, Lawrence Leritz, Vanessa Carlton, Yvonne Craig, Megan Mullally, Alex Westerman, and Madeleine Martin.

== Mae L. Wien Awards ==
Lawrence A. Wien, his daughters and their families founded the Mae L. Wien Awards in their mother's name. SAB students are chosen each year on the basis of their outstanding promise and a faculty member is honored for distinguished service. Former New York City Ballet ballet master in chief and SAB chairman of faculty, Peter Martins used to occasionally give a third award to a young choreographer at his discretion.

== In popular culture ==
School of American Ballet is featured in the 2020 Disney+ documentary On Pointe, showing the lives of several students during a year at the school.
