= Dance Theatre of Harlem =

American professional ballet company and school

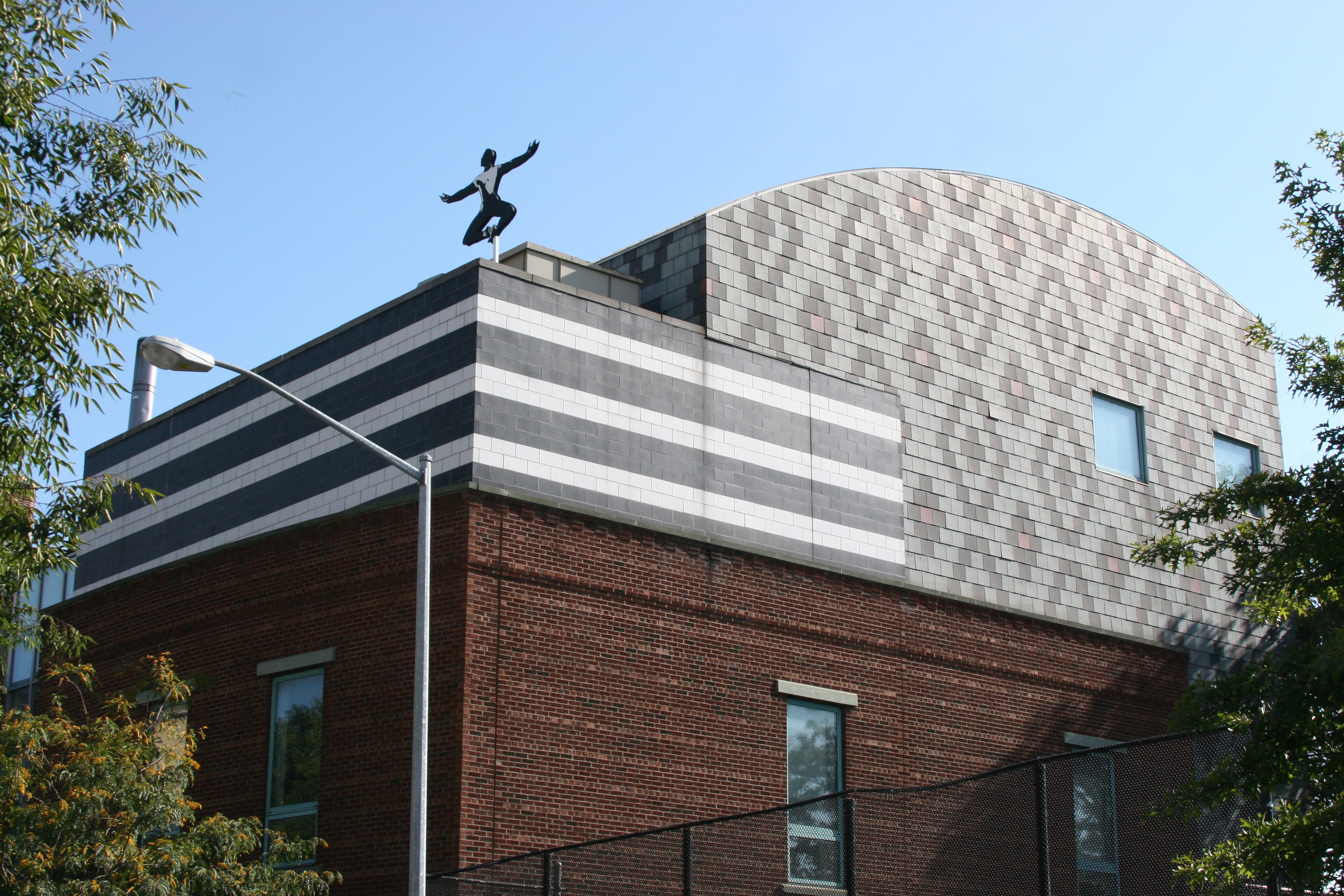
Dance Theatre of Harlem

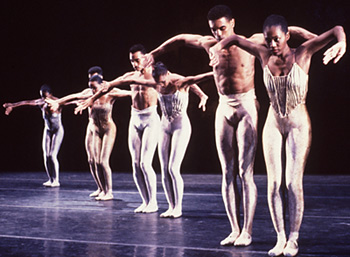
The Dance Theatre of Harlem perform Dialogues in 2006.

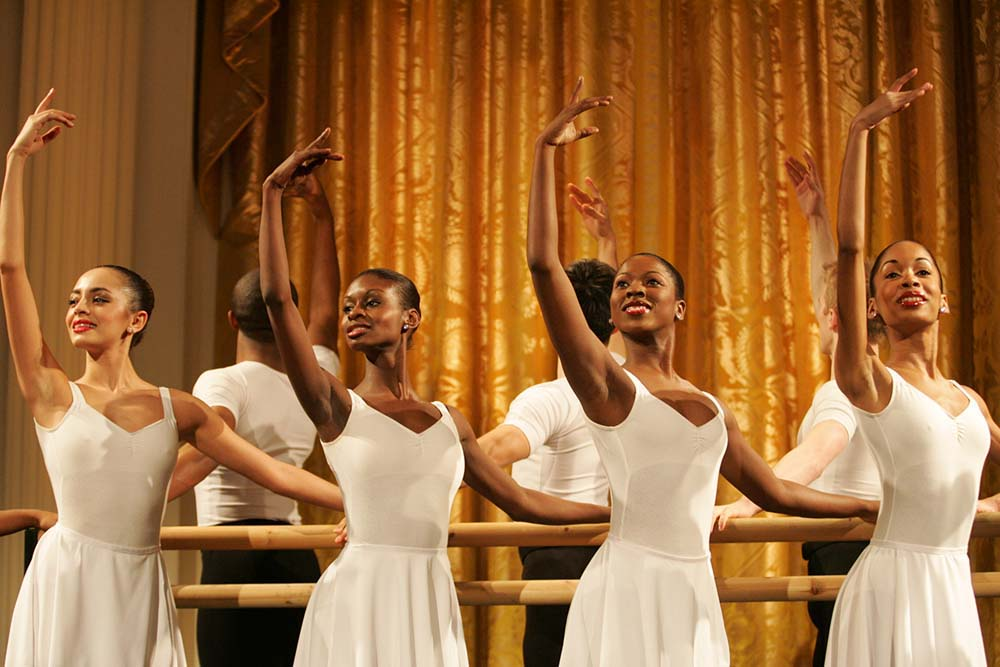
Young dancers from the Dance Theatre of Harlem perform during an exclusive dinner held at the White House on February 6, 2006. President George W. Bush and First Lady Laura Bush are in attendance.

Dance Theatre of Harlem (DTH) is an American professional ballet company and school based in Harlem, New York City. It was founded in 1969 under the directorship of Arthur Mitchell (dancer), Brock Peters, and Cicely Tyson. Mitchell later partnered with Karel Shook, but Shook did not cofound the company. Milton Rosenstock served as the company's music director from 1981 to 1992. The artistic director has been Robert Garland since 2022. The DTH is renowned for being both "the first Black classical ballet company", and "the first major ballet company to prioritize Black dancers".

== History ==
Arthur Mitchell, the first African-American principal dancer in a major ballet company (New York City Ballet), was sent to Brazil by the United States government to start up the National Ballet of Brazil. While on his way to the airport, he was shocked to hear news of the assassination of Martin Luther King, Jr. In conjunction with the civil rights movement, King's death inspired Mitchell to forgo his plans in Brazil. Instead, he would found a classical ballet school for the children of Harlem, the poor and predominantly black New York neighborhood where he was raised. Karel Shook, the first ballet teacher and a former ballet master at Dutch National Ballet, agreed to later partner with him. At the time, Shook was the best and only teacher of European descent willing to train African Americans in classical technique.

In the beginning, space at Church of the Master was used to hold classes. Soon afterwards, Mitchell would make a down payment on a disused garage at 466 West 152nd Street and convert it into the headquarters that still house the company today. Initially founded only as a school, Dance Theatre of Harlem as a company of African American ballet dancers was born out a necessity to match funds that had been contributed towards the school's existence. The only way to accomplish this was by earning revenue through performances. Following the original blueprints set forth by his mentor George Balanchine, Mitchell groomed the school's top talent as a group of performers. Though officially incorporated in 1969, Dance Theatre of Harlem would make its official debut with a public performance on January 8, 1971, at New York Guggenheim Museum, with three chamber ballets choreographed by Mitchell. During that opening season, the company's repertory was supplemented with several ballets by Balanchine and Jerome Robbins; in support of Mitchell's vision and company's future, Balanchine had given Mitchell access to all of his ballets.

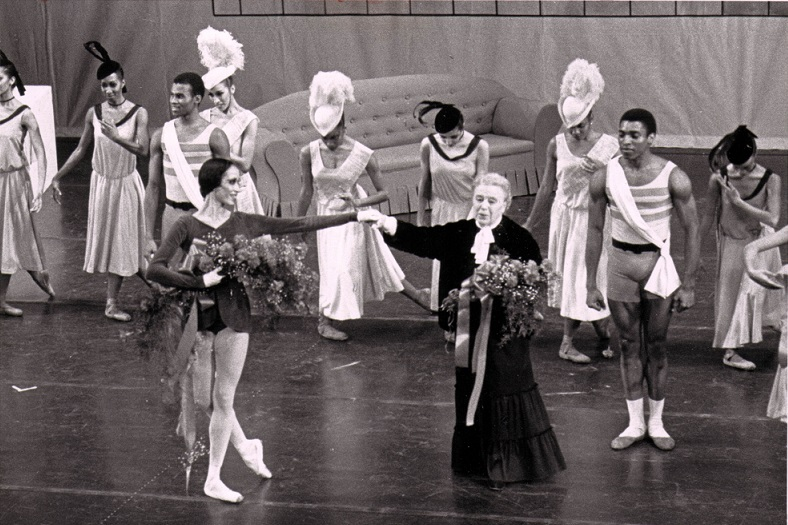
Virginia Johnson, Irina Nijinska and Eddie Shellman during the curtain calls after DTH's revival of Les Biches, 1983.

DTH would make its European debut at the Spoleto Festival in 1971. The company produced its first full season in 1974. That same year, the company debuted at Sadler's Wells Theatre. In 1984, Dance Theatre of Harlem premiered its most famous work, Creole Giselle (restaged by Frederic Franklin), which was set in the 1840s Louisiana Bayou. In 1988 DTH embarked on a five-week tour of the USSR, playing sold-out performances in Moscow, Tbilisi, and Leningrad, where the company received a standing ovation at the famed Kirov Theatre. In 1992, the company toured to South Africa in the "Dancing Through Barriers" tour that gave birth to the outreach program of the same name that still continues to operate. South African Suite, a collaboration with the Soweto String Quartet, was created after the company's visit to South Africa and became a staple in the repertoire of the company for years to come.

In 1997 during negotiations between management and the American Guild of Musical Artists to renew the terms of the existing AGMA contract, the company's dancers went on strike. After much deliberation, the company and the dancers reached an agreement. During the company's 30th anniversary season, Dance Theatre of Harlem and Mitchell were inducted into the National Museum of Dance and the Cornelius Vanderbilt Whitney Hall of Fame in Saratoga Springs, New York.

In 2000 The Dance Theater of Harlem participated in Symphony Space's "Wall to Wall Balanchine" concert in conjunction with City Ballet's Balanchine centennial. In the fall of 2000, with the leadership of the U.S. State Department, Council of Foreign Affairs and Secretary of State Madelaine Albright, Dance Theatre of Harlem made its inaugural tour to China performing in Beijing and Shanghai. This tour was considered a cultural exchange following the lifting of the U.S. economic boycott of China. FedEx was a corporate sponsor providing freight forwarding and United Airlines provided air transportation sponsorship for the company and staff. Janet Lee was a local promoter based in Shanghai that assisted in ticket sales and company performance fees. In mid-2004 the Dance Theatre of Harlem Company was put on hiatus due to severe financial constraints within the organization. The announcement was made by Arthur Mitchell at a press conference. The financial issues stemmed from significant funding for the Smuin ballet, "St. Louis Woman." In 2006 President George W. Bush honored Dance Theatre of Harlem at the White House for an evening of performances given by the DTH Ensemble and former company members. In February 2009 Dance Theatre of Harlem celebrated its 40th anniversary. From 2009 to 2012, The Dance Theatre of Harlem Ensemble, a second company that developed from the professional training program of the DTH school, toured nationally and internationally, under the auspices of Dance For America.

In 2011, Virginia Johnson, a founding dancer and former prima ballerina of the company, was named Artistic Director with Arthur Mitchell becoming Artistic Director Emeritus. In 2012, following an eight-year hiatus, Johnson returned Dance Theatre of Harlem to full company status. Since the return of the Dance Theatre of Harlem as a full company, Johnson has commissioned world premieres from Helen Pickett, John Alleyne, Tanya Wideman-Davis and Thaddeus Davis, Darrell Grand Moultrie, and Robert Garland. The new Dance Theatre of Harlem company has also presented ballets by George Balanchine, Nacho Duato, Donald Byrd, Ulysses Dove, Christopher Huggins and Alvin Ailey, among others. The company has held its subsequent seasons at The Rose Theater at Jazz at Lincoln Center and at New York City Center.

The Dance Theatre of Harlem touring exhibition, Dance Theatre of Harlem: 40 Years of Firsts premiered at the California African American Museum in Los Angeles in April 2010. This upgraded touring version of the original exhibition at the NY Public Library went on to tour throughout the U.S. until January 2018. 'Dance Theatre of Harlem: 40 Years of Firsts' recalls a groundbreaking history

DTH's archives, created and processed with assistance from the Dance Heritage Coalition, hold many important documents from the company's history. These include photographs of the backstage visit by Nelson Mandela during the historic DTH tour to Johannesburg, South Africa, a handwritten score by Karel Shook, and designs by Salvatore Ferragamo. In 2013, the DTH archives received a Sustaining Cultural Heritage Collections grant from the National Endowment for the Humanities to support the improvement of sustainable preservation measures for the DTH archival collection.

== Former principal and notable dancers ==
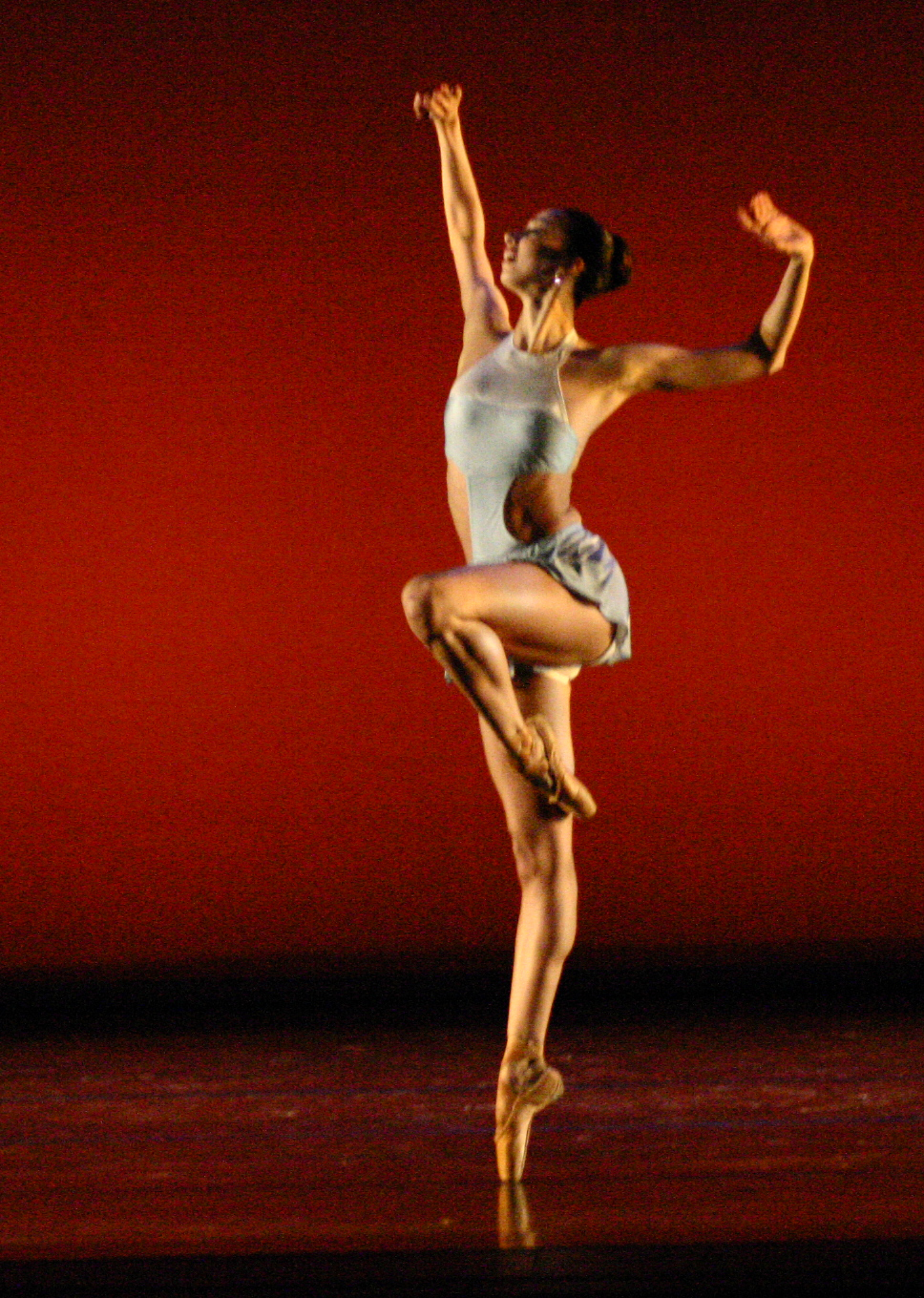
Alicia Graf Mack in Robert Garland's Return

- Karen KB Brown
- Charmaine Hunter
- Fredrick Davis
- Michaela DePrince
- Chyrstyn Fentroy
- Alicia Graf Mack
- Lorraine Graves
- Alicia Holloway
- Virginia Johnson
- Stephanie Dabney
- Robert Garland (Artistic Director and Resident Choreographer)
- Gayle McKinney-Griffith
- Melanie Person
- Ingrid Silva
- Llanchie Stevenson
- Mel Tomlinson
- Rasta Thomas
- Eric Underwood

== Outreach work ==
The Dance Theatre of Harlem School offers training to more than 1,000 young people annually with its community program called Dancing Through Barriers, open to any child who wants to study dance. The company's Dancing Through Barriers Ensemble does outreach throughout the US. It accepts pre-school children up to senior citizens. The school offers specializations in children's movement, European ballet, choreography, and musicology.

Dance Theatre of Harlem now has a Pre-Professional Residency program at the John F. Kennedy Center for the Performing Arts in Washington, D.C., for dancers aged from eight to 18. If accepted, the students meet every Saturday, October through April, and work with DTH resident choreographer Robert Garland. The program includes four levels from beginner to advanced for both ladies and gentlemen of the DC metro area. In April, the program culminates with a performance on the Kennedy Center's Concert Hall stage as a part of the Millennium Stage series.

Though the company ceased performing in 2004 due to budgetary constraints, during that hiatus the Dancing Though Barriers Ensemble continued its community outreach as the only performing entity of the organization. From 2012 to 2017 Roberto Villanueva served as the director of Dancing Through the Barriers, greatly expanding the program's presence throughout New York.
