= Arthur Mitchell (dancer) =

American ballet dancer and choreographer (1934–2018)

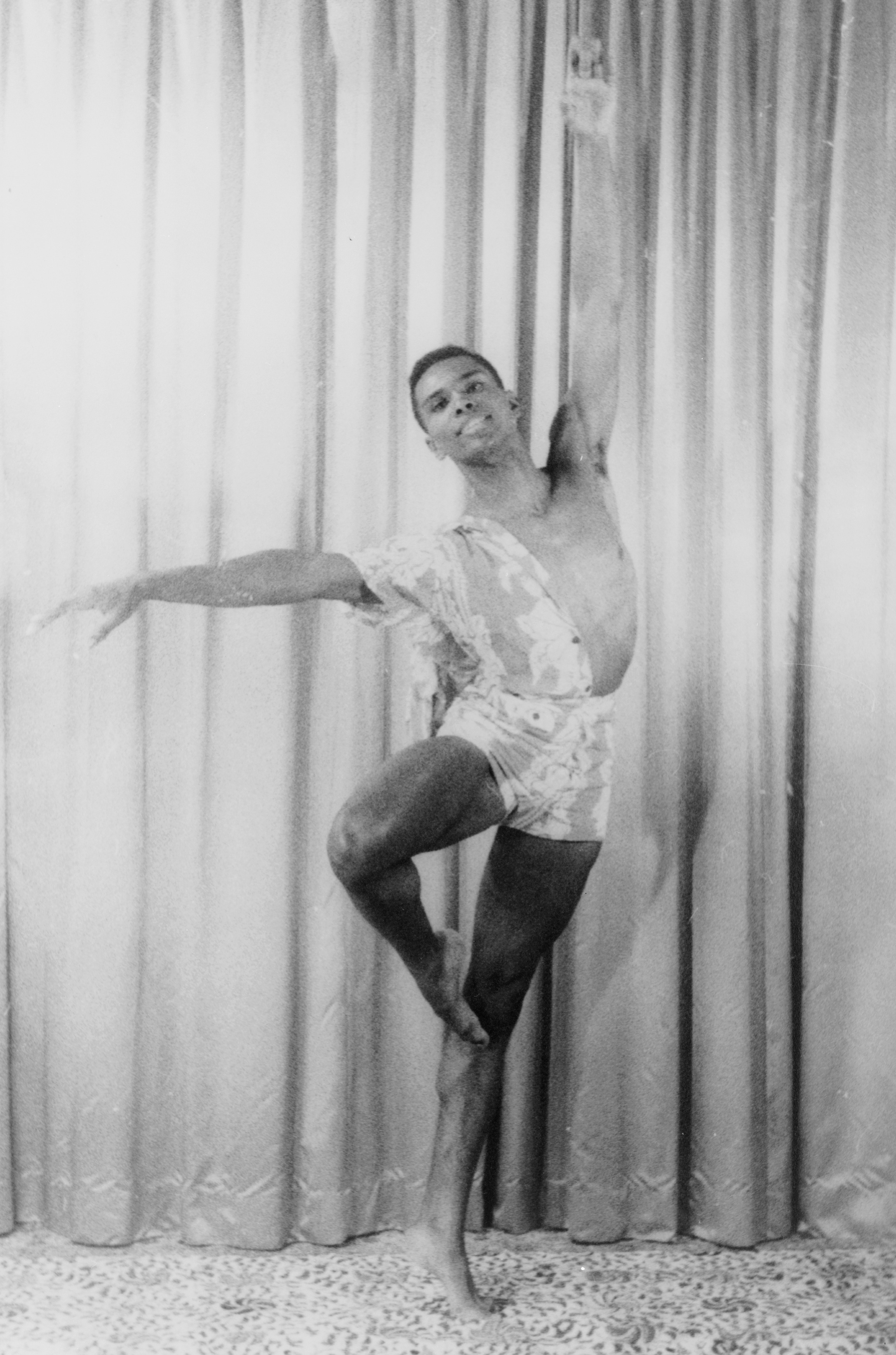
- Arthur Mitchell in 1955 by Carl Van Vechten
- Born: March 27, 1934; Harlem, New York City, U.S.
- Died: September 19, 2018 (aged 84); Manhattan, New York City, U.S.
- Education: High School of Performing Arts; School of American Ballet
- Occupations: Ballet dancer; Choreographer; Artistic Director
- Organizations: New York City Ballet; Dance Theatre of Harlem
- Awards: Kennedy Center Honors; MacArthur Fellow; U.S. National Medal of Arts; National Museum of Dance and Hall of Fame; Fletcher Foundation fellowship; Heinz Award in the Arts and Humanities (2001)

Arthur Mitchell (March 27, 1934 – September 19, 2018) was an American ballet dancer, choreographer, and founder and director of ballet companies. In 1955, he was the first African-American dancer with the New York City Ballet, where he was promoted to principal dancer the following year and danced in major roles until 1966. He then founded ballet companies in Spoleto, Washington, D.C., and Brazil. In 1969, he founded a training school and the first African-American classical ballet company, Dance Theatre of Harlem. Among other awards, Mitchell was recognized as a MacArthur Fellow, inducted into the National Museum of Dance's Mr. & Mrs. Cornelius Vanderbilt Whitney Hall of Fame, and received the United States National Medal of Arts and a Fletcher Foundation fellowship.

== Early life ==
Mitchell was one of four siblings, the son of a building superintendent, and grew up in the streets of Harlem, New York. Forced at the age of 12 to assume financial responsibility for his family in the wake of his father's incarceration, Mitchell worked numerous jobs, including shoe-shining, mopping floors, newspaper delivery, and work in a meat shop. Despite his duties, Mitchell became involved with street gangs, though this did not ultimately deter him from finding success.

As a teenager, Mitchell was encouraged by a guidance counselor to apply for admission to the High School of Performing Arts. Upon being accepted he decided to work towards having a career in classical ballet. Following his graduation in the early 1950s, he won a dance award and scholarship to study at the School of American Ballet, the school affiliated with the New York City Ballet. In 1954, following his 1952 Broadway debut in the opera Four Saints in Three Acts, Mitchell would return to Broadway to perform in the Harold Arlen musical House of Flowers, alongside Diahann Carroll, Geoffrey Holder, Alvin Ailey, Carmen de Lavallade, and Pearl Bailey.

== New York City Ballet ==
In 1955 Mitchell made his debut as the first African American with the New York City Ballet (NYCB), performing in Western Symphony. Rising to the position of principal dancer with the company in 1956, he performed in all the major ballets in its repertoire, including A Midsummer Night's Dream, The Nutcracker, Bugaku, Agon, and Arcade.

Choreographer and director of the NYCB George Balanchine created the pas de deux in Agon, especially for Mitchell and the white Southern ballerina Diana Adams. Audience members initially complained about partnering Mitchell with a white woman, but Balanchine refused to change the pairing. Although Mitchell danced this role with white partners throughout the world, he could not perform it on commercial television in the United States until 1968, when the performance aired on Johnny Carson's The Tonight Show.

Mitchell left the New York City Ballet in 1966 to appear in several Broadway shows, and helped found ballet companies in Spoleto, Italy, Washington, D.C., and Brazil, where he founded and directed the National Ballet Company of Brazil.

== Dance Theatre of Harlem ==
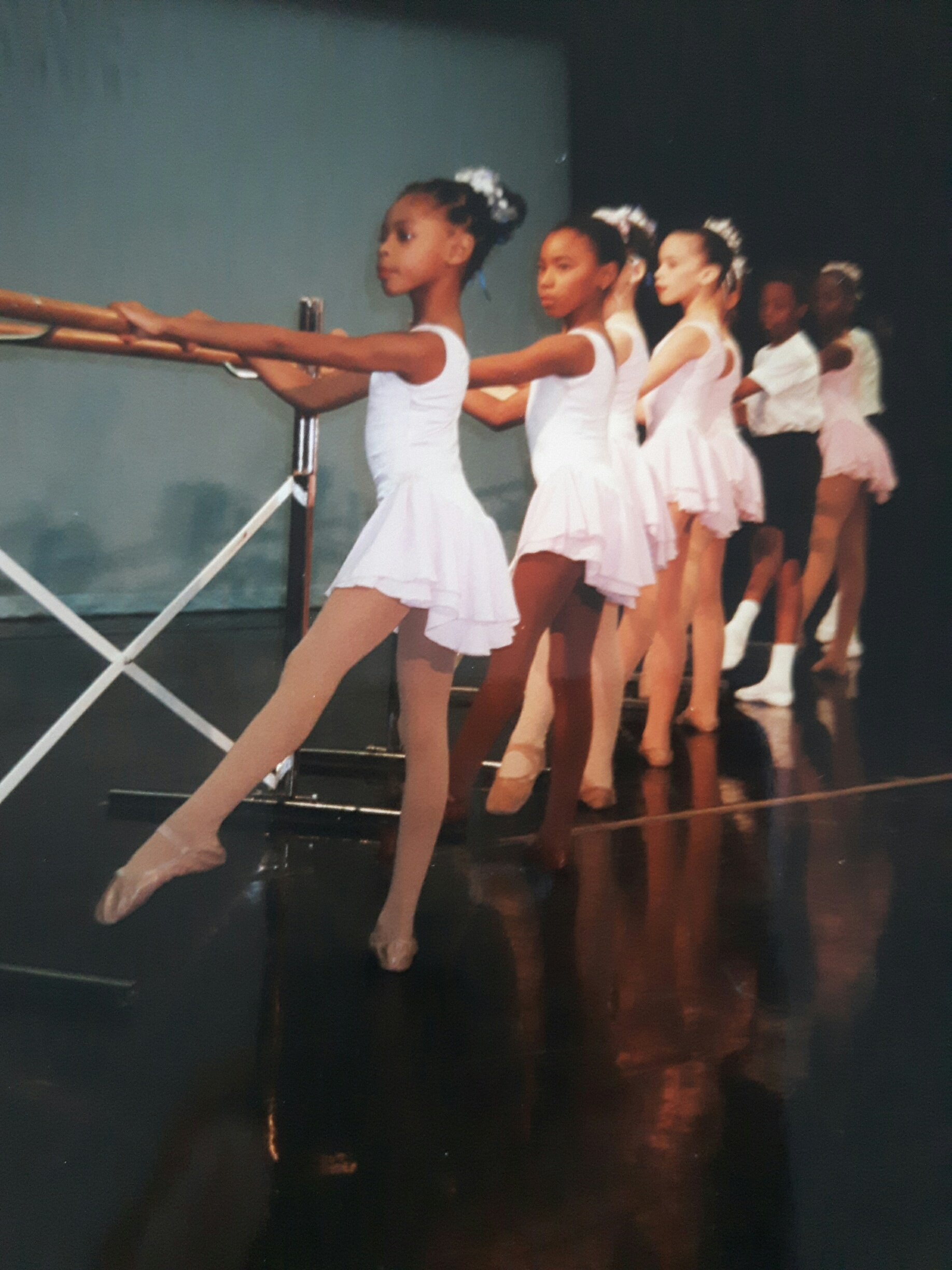
Ballet School of Dance Theatre of Harlem (1998)

After the assassination of Dr. Martin Luther King, Jr. in 1968, Mitchell returned to Harlem, where he was determined to provide opportunities in dance for the children in that community. A year later, he and his teacher, Karel Shook, inaugurated a classical ballet school. Mitchell used $25,000 of his own money to start the school. About a year later he received $315,000 in a matching funds grant from the Ford Foundation. The Dance Theatre of Harlem (DTH) was born in 1969 with 30 children in a church basement in a community where resources of talent and creative energy were virtually untapped. Two months later, Mitchell had attracted 400 youngsters to attend classes. Two years later they presented their first productions as a professional company. Mitchell used his personal savings to convert a garage into the company's home.

In Harlem, DTH created an explosion of professional opportunity in dance, music, and other related theater activities. The school has an outstanding number of former students who have been successfully engaged in careers as dancers and musicians, as technicians in production, stagecraft, and wardrobe, and in instruction and arts administration. With this success, DTH challenged the classical dance world to review its stereotypes and revise its boundaries.

== Legacy ==
The Arthur Mitchell Collection is held at the Rare Book & Manuscript Library, Columbia University. Arthur Mitchell: Harlem's Ballet Trailblazer, an exhibition celebrating his life and career, opened at the Wallach Art Gallery at Columbia on January 12, 2018. The exhibition website contains numerous images and documents from the collection, as well as a timeline of Mitchell's career, a repertory list for the Dance Theatre of Harlem, and original essays.

== Death ==
Mitchell died on September 19, 2018, from renal failure.

== Awards and honors ==
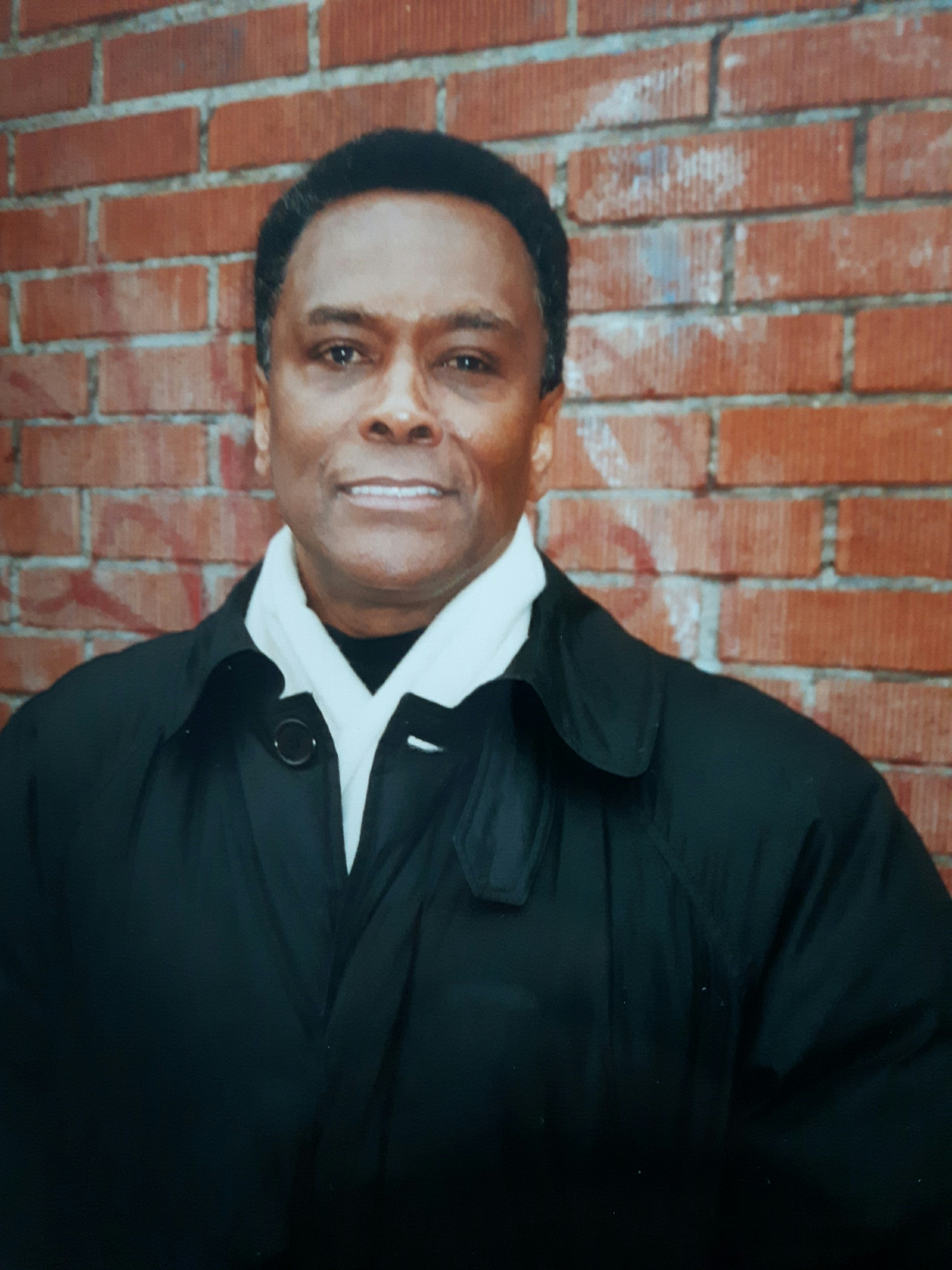
Arthur Mitchell, NY (1998)

Mitchell received numerous awards in recognition of his groundbreaking work and achievements, including:

- 1989 – Golden Plate Award of the American Academy of Achievement.
- 1993 – Kennedy Center Honors, one of the youngest persons recognized.
- 1994 – Named as a MacArthur Fellow.
- 1995 – United States National Medal of Arts, presented by the President
- 1999 – Inducted into the National Museum of Dance C.V. Whitney Hall of Fame, Saratoga Springs, New York.
- 2001 – The 7th Annual Heinz Award in the Arts and Humanities.
- 2005 – Awarded a Fletcher Foundation fellowship in its inaugural year, in recognition of his contributions to African-American culture.
- 2006 – Mitchell and the Dance Theatre of Harlem were honored with a dinner at the White House by President George W. Bush.

In addition, Mitchell received honorary doctorates from numerous leading universities, including University of North Carolina School of the Arts (1985), Juilliard School (1990), Hamilton College, Brown University (1996), City College of New York, Harvard University, The New School for Social Research, Williams College, Yale University (2001), Southern Methodist University (2009) and Columbia University (2016). He also received awards from the City of New York and community organizations.

== See also ==
- List of African-American firsts
- List of African-American ballerinas
