= Troy Powell =

American dancer, choreographer, educator, and director (born 1969)

Troy Powell (born January 27, 1969, in Spanish Harlem), also known as Troy O'Neil Powell, is an American dancer, choreographer, educator, and director. He is a former principal dancer with the Alvin Ailey American Dance Theater and former artistic director of AAADT's second company, Ailey II.

Powell was fired in July 2020 after an independent investigation into allegations of sexual abuse at the Ailey School concluded that he had engaged in "inappropriate communications" with students who were interested in joining the Ailey II.

== Early life ==
Born and raised in Spanish Harlem, Powell met Alvin Ailey at the age of nine when Ailey came to his school to teach a masterclass. Unknown to Powell at the time, the class was actually an audition for a scholarship to attend the first children's program at The Ailey School. Though he lacked formal dance training, Powell was handpicked by Ailey to join the program. During his time at school, Ailey served as a mentor and father figure to Powell. In 1987, he graduated from LaGuardia High School of The Performing Arts with a concentration in dance. The following year, he was invited by Sylvia Waters to join Ailey II, which was then known as the AIvin Ailey Repertory Ensemble.

As a member of AAADT's second company, Powell danced in a wide range of ballets by Ailey and other commissioned choreographers. During his time with Ailey II, Powell was singled out for his dancing by Jennifer Dunning who wrote in her review for The New York Times that "he performs as if filled with the dance, with an infectious though private look of delight that has a Nijinsky-like radiance to it."

== Career ==
Powell was invited to join the Alvin Ailey American Dance Theater in 1991 by Judith Jamison, who had assumed artistic directorship of the company following Ailey's death in 1989.

During his tenure with the AAADT, Powell toured across the globe performing principal roles in Ailey's Blue's Suite, For 'Bird'-With Love, Masekela Language, The River, Night Creature, Phases, and the Sinner Man trio in Revelations, Ulysses Dove's Episodes, Hans van Manen's Polish Pieces, George Faison's Suite Otis, Talley Beatty's Stack-Up, Earl Mosely's Days Past, Not Forgotten, Billy Wilson's The Winter in Lisbon, Donald Byrd's Dance at The Gym, and in Jawole Willa Jo Zollar's male casting of Shelter.

After presenting his choreography for Passages at the 1996 Ailey Gala, Powell was commissioned to create a ballet for the main company. The piece, Ascension, debuted in 1998 and was dedicated by Powell to the memory of his mother.

In an interview with The New York Times, Powell praised Jamison for continuing Ailey's tradition of providing opportunities to people of colour to choreograph and showcase their artistry.

In tandem with his career at Ailey, Powell also danced with Complexions Contemporary Ballet, which was founded by his Ailey colleagues Dwight Rhoden and Desmond Richardson, and performed as a principal guest artist with Batsheva Dance Company, Dallas Black Dance Theatre, and Fred Benjamin Dance Company.

== Director of Ailey II ==
In 2001, after performing with Alvin Ailey American Dance Theater for ten years, Powell left the company to join The Ailey School as a master Horton-technique teacher and to become the resident choreographer of Ailey II. His ballets for Ailey II have included The Tyner Project, Fragments, First Circles, Point of Departure, How Small a Thought, External Knot, Hope (How They Rise), Reference Point, and Ebb and Flow.

In 2003, he was appointed associate director of Ailey II. Following the retirement of Sylvia Waters in 2012, he was designated artistic director of Ailey II, making him the second person to lead the company in its 38-year history. In 2015, Powell produced Ailey II in the company's first solo season at the Joyce Theatre.

As part of the 2019 Ailey Spirit Gala—which commemorated the 50th anniversary of The Ailey School—Powell choreographed a biographical ballet that followed his journey through the Ailey institution, from entering the school to joining the first company. He used students from The Ailey School along with members of Ailey II and the main company to choreograph the piece which he titled, Testimony. AAADT leading dancer Solomon Dumas danced as the adult version of Powell. Powell stated that Dumas' status as the first graduate of AileyCamp to join the Alvin Ailey American Dance Theater as a company member, made their stories mirror images of each other. Powell dedicated Testimony to Alvin Ailey, crediting him as "a lifesaver" who "gave me these two feet that I’m standing on."

== Media ==
In 2010, Powell appeared on season 14 of America's Next Top Model, the episode "Let's Dance" as a guest coach and choreographer, teaching the models how to pose in different styles of dance. He was featured on the Polish edition of So You Think You Can Dance as a guest choreographer in 2012, teaching the contestants choreography from his ballet External Knot.
