= Renee Robinson =

American dancer

Renee Robinson is a retired American dancer from Washington, D.C., who performed as a Principal Dancer of the Alvin Ailey American Dance Theater. She began her dance training in classical ballet at the Jones-Haywood School of Ballet. She also attended the School of American Ballet, the Dance Theatre of Harlem and The Ailey School. Robinson was a member of the Alvin Ailey II, before becoming a member of the Alvin Ailey American Dance Theater in 1981.

Before joining AAADT, Robinson was a student at New York University, majoring in dance and minoring in economics. She was torn between becoming a professional dancer or an attorney specializing in the arts.

She has worked with many renowned choreographers, such as Alvin Ailey, Lar Lubovitch, Donald McKayle, Judith Jamison, Ulysses Dove, Jerome Robbins, Bill T. Jones, Garth Fagan, Katherine Dunham, Hans van Manen and Carmen de Lavallade.

Robinson has also performed at the televised Kennedy Center Awards. Other televised appearances include performing at President Clinton's first inauguration, American Express advertisements, the Bill Cosby Special on Alvin Ailey and on the PBS special "A Hymn for Alvin Ailey". In 2003, she performed at the White House State Dinner in honor of the President of Kenya, Mwai Kibaki. In 2008, while performing in the East Room of the White House during the first dance event hosted by Michelle Obama, Robinson hit one of the chandeliers while performing.

In their 2006 season, the Alvin Ailey American Dance Theater celebrated Robinson's 25th year with the company; her tenure is the longest of any female dancer in the company's history. Upon her retirement (with her final performance with the company on December 9, 2012), she was the last company member to have worked with its founder, Alvin Ailey, as well as being the only dancer to have performed with all three of the company's artistic directors (inclusive of artistic director emerita Judith Jamison and Jamison's successor, Robert Battle).

== Select performance pieces ==
(Choreographer, Title)

- Alvin Ailey, Blues Suite
- Alvin Ailey, Revelations
- Alvin Ailey, Maskela Langage
- Alvin Ailey, Cry
- Donald McKayle, Rainbow ‘Round My Shoulder
- Alvin Ailey, Night Creature
- George Faison, Suite Otis
- Ulysses Dove, Bad Blood
- Ulysses Dove, Vespers
- Ulysses Dove, Episodes
- Judith Jamison, Forgotten Time
- Billy Wilson, The Winter of Lisbon
- Judith Jamison, Hymn
- Ronald K. Brown, Grace
- Carmen de Lavallade, Sweet Bitter Love
