= Tracy Inman =

American dancer and educator

Tracy Inman (born January 5, 1961, in Washington, D.C.) is an American dancer, choreographer, and educator who performed with the Alvin Ailey American Dance Theater. He is currently the co-director of The Ailey School and a choreographer & consultant for the television series Pose.

== Education ==
Born and raised in Washington, D.C., Inman, who is African-American, attended the Duke Ellington School of the Arts with a concentration in orchestral music. While at school he played violin with the D.C. Youth Orchestra, where he also served as a concert master and teacher. In 1981 he auditioned for The Ailey School, which accepted him and awarded him a fellowship scholarship to fund his studies. Having no prior experience with concert dance, Inman struggled throughout his first year of study, though by end of his second year his progress was such that he was invited by artistic director Sylvia Waters to join Ailey 2. In addition to dancing with the company, he also spent time working with the Dance Place.

== Career ==
In 1984 Inman left Ailey 2 to join the international production of the musical Cats in Vienna, Austria, where he played the character 'Tumble-Brutus'. In 1989 he danced for The Judith Jamison Project and was then invited to join the Alvin Ailey American Dance Theater—over which Jamison had just been appointed artistic director—the following year. During his time performing around the world with the AAADT, Inman danced in a wide repertoire of ballets created by choreographic masters including Alvin Ailey, Donald McKayle, Jerome Robbins, Pearl Primus, Louis Johnson, Donald Byrd, Ulysses Dove, and Jamison herself. In 1994 he joined Desmond Richardson and Dwight Rhoden, performing as an original member of their company Complexions Contemporary Ballet. Inman returned to the musical Cats in 1996, this time in Antwerp, Belgium as the character "Alonzo".

He came back to The Ailey School in 1999 to teach the Horton dance technique and was then appointed co-director of the school's junior division alongside Melanie Person. He became associate director of the school in 2009. Following the death of Denise Jefferson in 2010 he was designated co-director of The Ailey School, again alongside Melanie Person. During his time as co-director, Inman has emphasized the importance training in classical modern, knowing dance history, and utilizing musicality and breathing while dancing. He has also served as the Ailey company's ambassador for visiting guests, including training Conan O'Brien in dance on national television during O'Brien's visit to New York City. Since 2018 Inman has served as a choreographer and consultant on modern dance for the TV series Pose. In an article with the New York Times he revealed that after hiring him, the show changed its initial focus from Martha Graham's technique to Lester Horton's, which served as an inspiration for Alvin Ailey's choreography. This is because Inman, who teaches Horton, felt that the technique was more suitable for illustrating dynamic male dancing.
