= Hope Boykin =

American dancer and choreographer

- Born: Durham, North Carolina, United States
- Education: American Dance Festival
- Occupations: choreographer and dancer
- Years active: 1993–present
- Website: www.hopeboykindance.com

Hope Boykin is an American dancer, choreographer and former member of the Alvin Ailey American Dance Theater.

== Early life and education ==
Boykin was born in Durham, North Carolina, where she started taking dance classes at the age of four. She went on to study with the American Dance Festival and, while a student at Howard University in Washington, D.C., performed with Lloyd Whitmore’s New World Dance Company.

== Career ==
After leaving Howard University, Boykin commenced study at The Ailey School; while still a student there, she was invited to be a founding member of Dwight Rhoden and Desmond Richardson's Complexions Contemporary Ballet. From there, she went on to perform with Philadanco under Joan Myers Brown. During this early period of her career, she also assisted choreographer Talley Beatty.

In 2000, Boykin was invited to join the Alvin Ailey American Dance Theater. Called "a small force of nature on the stage" by The New York Times, in her career with Ailey she has performed an extensive repertoire in 71 countries across six continents. She has also taken part in offstage Ailey initiatives, including hosting their Ailey All Access video series. In 2020, she left the company. Her final performance with the company was cancelled due to the coronavirus pandemic.

Boykin also works as an educator, and joined the faculty of the University of Southern California (USC)'s Glorya Kaufman School of Dance as the artist in residence for the 2019-2020 academic year. In 2020, she served as the artistic lead for the Kennedy Center Dance Lab (KCDL), a two-week dance and leadership program for high school students.

== Selected choreography ==
Boykin's work as a choreographer includes:

- Acceptance In Surrender (2005) - commissioned by the Alvin Ailey American Dancer Theater and created in collaboration with Ailey Company members Abdur-Rahim Jackson and Matthew Rushing
- in.ter.pret (2006) - commissioned by the Dallas Black Dance Theatre
- Go in Grace (2008) - commissioned by the Alvin Ailey American Dancer Theater for the Company's 50th anniversary season, with music by gospel choir Sweet Honey in the Rock
- r-Evolution Dream (2016) - commissioned by the Alvin Ailey American Dancer Theater, with score by Ali Jackson and historic and original text narrated by Tony Award-winning actor Leslie Odom Jr.
- MomentsUponMoments (2018) - commissioned by Damian Woetzel for DEMO at the Kennedy Center and reinterpreted for the 2019 Vail Dance Festival
- Tribute to Joan Myers Brown (2019) - commissioned by the 2019 Bessie Awards as part of a tribute to Joan Myers Brown in recognition of her lifetime achievement award for work as a dance education pioneer
- On. Toward. Press. (2020) - commissioned by the Dallas Black Dance Theatre
- How Love Sounds (2025) - commissioned by the Kennedy Center for Paul Taylor Dance Company's 70th anniversary

== Honors ==
- Bessie Award (1998) - Outstanding Performer (with Philadanco/Dance Women Living Legends)
- Urban Bush Women Choreographic Center Fellow (2019-20)
