= Alvin Ailey American Dance Theater =

Modern dance company based in New York City

Coordinates: 40°46′01″N 73°59′13″W

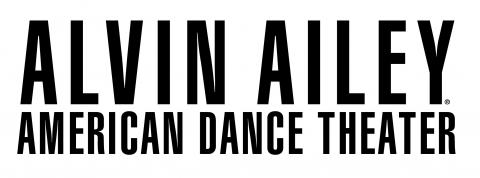

General information
- Year founded: 1958; 68 years ago
- Founding artistic director: Alvin Ailey
- Location: The Joan Weill Center for Dance; 405 West 55th Street; New York, New York 10019
- Principal venue: New York City Center
- Website: ailey.org

Senior staff
- Executive director: Bennett Rink

Artistic staff
- Artistic director: Alicia Graf Mack (beginning July 1, 2025)

Other
- Official school: Ailey School
- Associated schools: Ailey Extension

Alvin Ailey American Dance Theater (AAADT), formerly Alvin Ailey Dance Theater (AADT), is as of 2024 the largest modern dance company in the United States. Based in New York City, the company was founded in 1958 as Alvin Ailey and Company by choreographer, dancer, and Presidential Medal of Freedom recipient Alvin Ailey (1931–1989). In 1959, Ailey also co-founded the Clark Center for the Performing Arts, a studio and performance space where AADT practiced and performed, which closed in 1989. In 2014, Clark Center NYC was established by former faculty and students to honour the legacy of the Clark Center.

The Alvin Ailey Dance Foundation, which includes AAADT, Ailey II, the Ailey School, Ailey Extension, AileyCamp, and other operations, is housed in the 87,000-square-foot (8,083 m^{2}) Joan Weill Center for Dance, in Manhattan.

AAADT is recognized as a vital American cultural ambassador by the United States Congress, and has performed for a plethora of audiences in around the world. Known for combining elements of modern dance with African American cultural traditions, AAADT has played a significant role in expanding the visibility of Black artists in concert dance.

== History ==
=== Foundation and performances (1958-1989) ===
In 1958, Alvin Ailey and a group of young Black modern dancers performed as Alvin Ailey and Company at the 92nd Street Y in New York. Ailey was the company's director, choreographer, and principal dancer. The company started as an ensemble of seven dancers, including Nat Horne, Minnie Marshall, Ella Thompson Moore, and Dorene Richardson, "the only dancer who performed in Alvin Ailey’s two concerts (1958 and 1960) at the 92nd Street Y." In addition to Ailey, the original company worked with guest choreographers. For the company's first performance, Ailey's Ariette Oubliée, Blues Suite, and Cinco Latinos were featured.

In 1959, Ailey was a co-founder, with Thelma Hill, of the Clark Center for the Performing Arts, a studio and performance space situated in the Westside YWCA building. The first director of the center was Edele Nielsen Holtz, who served from 1960 to 1963.

In 1960, the Alvin Ailey Dance Theater became the first resident dance company in the Clark Center for the Performing Arts, In the same year, the company, later to be renamed the Alvin Ailey American Dance Theater (AAADT), presented the premiere of Revelations at Kaufmann Concert Hall in New York. Rehearsals for Revelations were held in the basement of Clark Center for the Performing Arts,

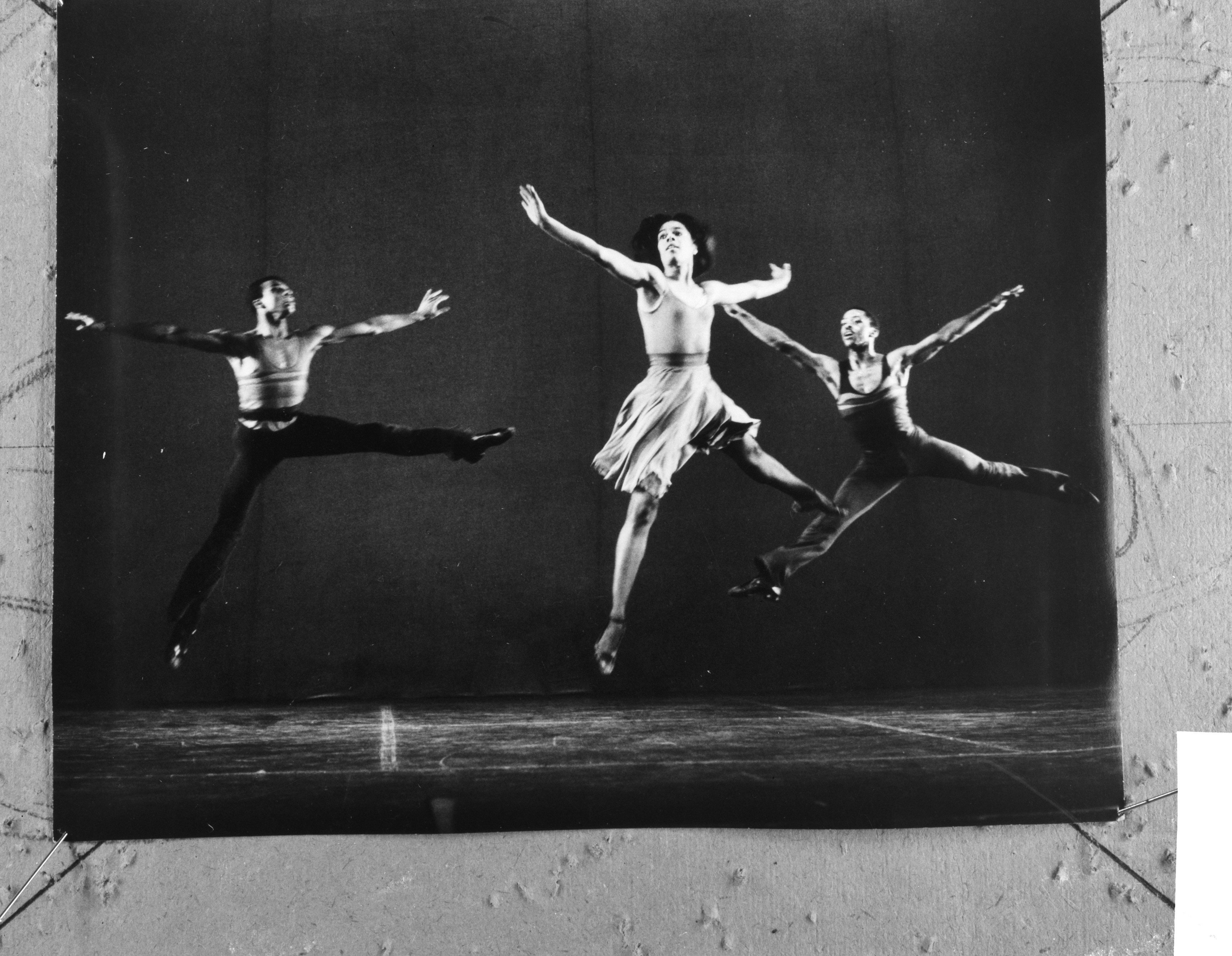
Alvin Ailey Dance Theater, Amsterdam, 1965

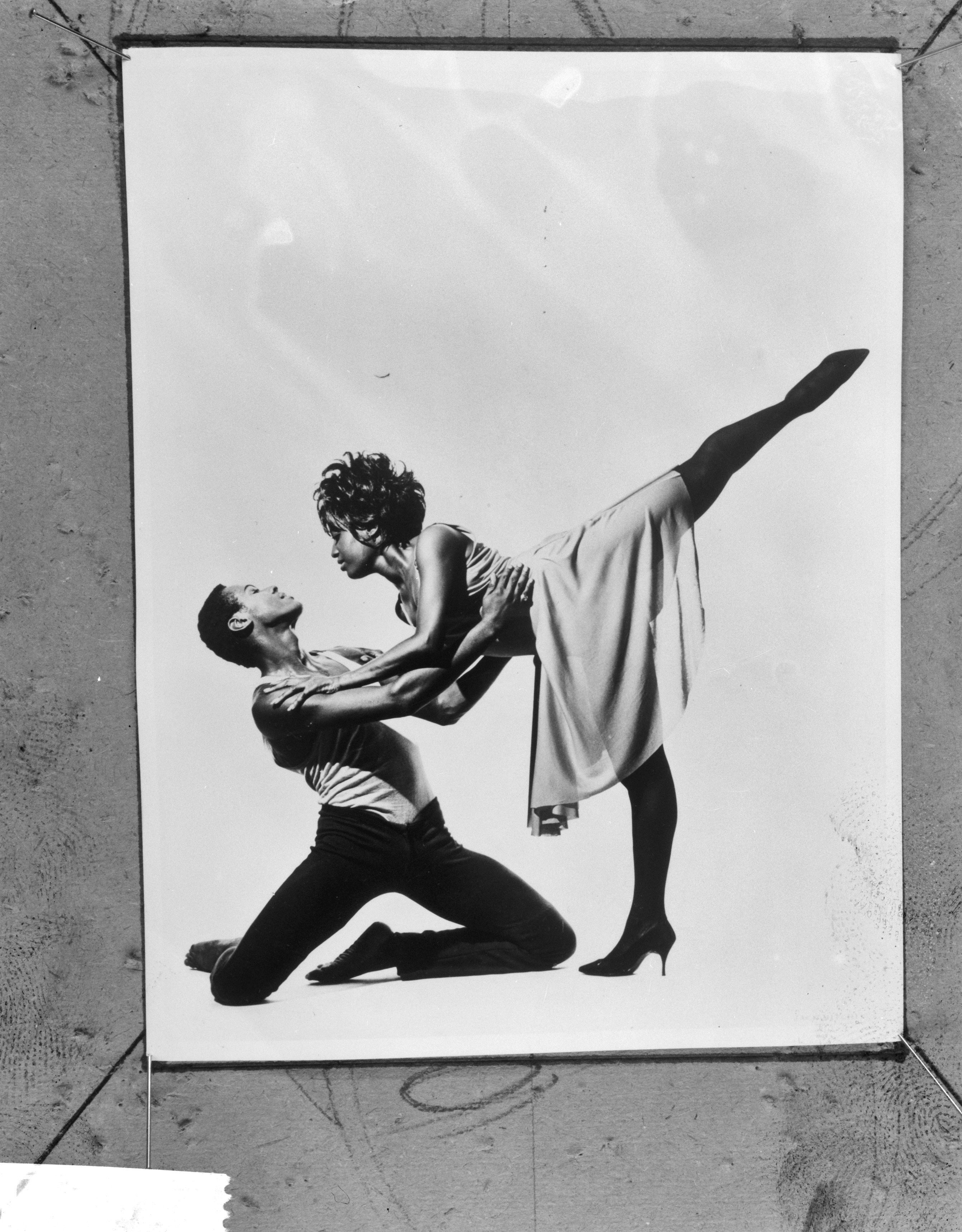
Alvin Ailey Dance Theater, Amsterdam, 1965

Soon after, in 1962, Ailey recast his all-black dance company into a multi-racial group, and the modernized company completed its first international tour to Australia and southeast Asia. The tour of the Lavallade-Ailey American Dance Company, named for Ailey's partnership with Carmen de Lavallade, started in Sydney, Australia, and ended in Seoul, South Korea. They continued to tour around the world, now in Europe in 1964, as the company of five women and five men toured as the Alvin Ailey Dance Theater. The dancers included Loretta Abbott, Takako Asakawa, Hope Clarke, Joan Peters, and Lucinda Ransom, Alvin Ailey, Bill Luther, Hector Mercado, James Truitte, and Dudley Williams, performed in Paris and London. Dancer and choreographer Judith Jamison joined the dance company in 1965, and would later serve as the company's first artistic director after Alvin Ailey's death in 1989.

In 1969, the Alvin Ailey American Dance Theater performed at Broadway's Billy Rose Theater for their time. Following, in 1970, the Ailey company and school relocated to 229 East 59th Street in Manhattan, a renovated church building. In April of that year, a financial crisis caused Ailey to issue a statement that the dissolution of the company might take place. The crisis abated, however, and in 1971 AAADT made its first performance at the New York City Center.

AAADT had their debut performance at the State Theater at Lincoln Center in 1974. The program featured Ailey's “Feast of Ashes,” Talley Beatty's “The Road of the Phoebe Snow,” John Butler's “Portrait of Billie” revival, the premiere of John Jones's “Nocturne,” and Joyce Trisler's “Journey.” The company then performed at President Jimmy Carter’s inauguration gala in 1977.

1988 marked the AAADT's 30th-anniversary season, where they hosted a gala at the City Center. The company and school are located at 45th Street and Broadway, and move the following year into a 36,000 square-foot space at 211 West 61st Street in Manhattan.

In 1989, Alvin Ailey died from AIDS-related complications. Judith Jamison replaced Ailey as the artistic director of AAADT. The company was struggling with mounting debts, and the number of company dancers was reduced. In 1989, the Clark Center for the Performing Arts was forced to close.

In 2000, AAADT launched the silent phase of a five-year, sixty-six million dollar capital campaign for a new building that would double its size and an endowment for financial stability. Two years later, AAADT broke ground on its new building site on West 55th Street.

The United States Postal Service issued a first class postage stamp honoring Alvin Ailey in 2004 as part of the American Choreographers stamp series, and the Oprah Winfrey Foundation pledged one million dollars to endow a student scholarship at the Ailey School. A year later, the Ailey organization, including the main company, Ailey II, and the Ailey School, moved into its new West 55th Street home, the Joan Weill Center for Dance, the former WNET-TV studios where AAADT first appeared on television in the early 1960s.

In 2008, Glorya Kaufman donated six million dollars to AAADT's educational programs, including support for AileyCamp programs, the Ailey School, and a BFA program with Fordham University. The fifth floor lobby in the Weill Center for Dance is named in Kaufman's honor. The United States Congress also passed a resolution this year officially designating the company a "vital American Cultural Ambassador to the World."

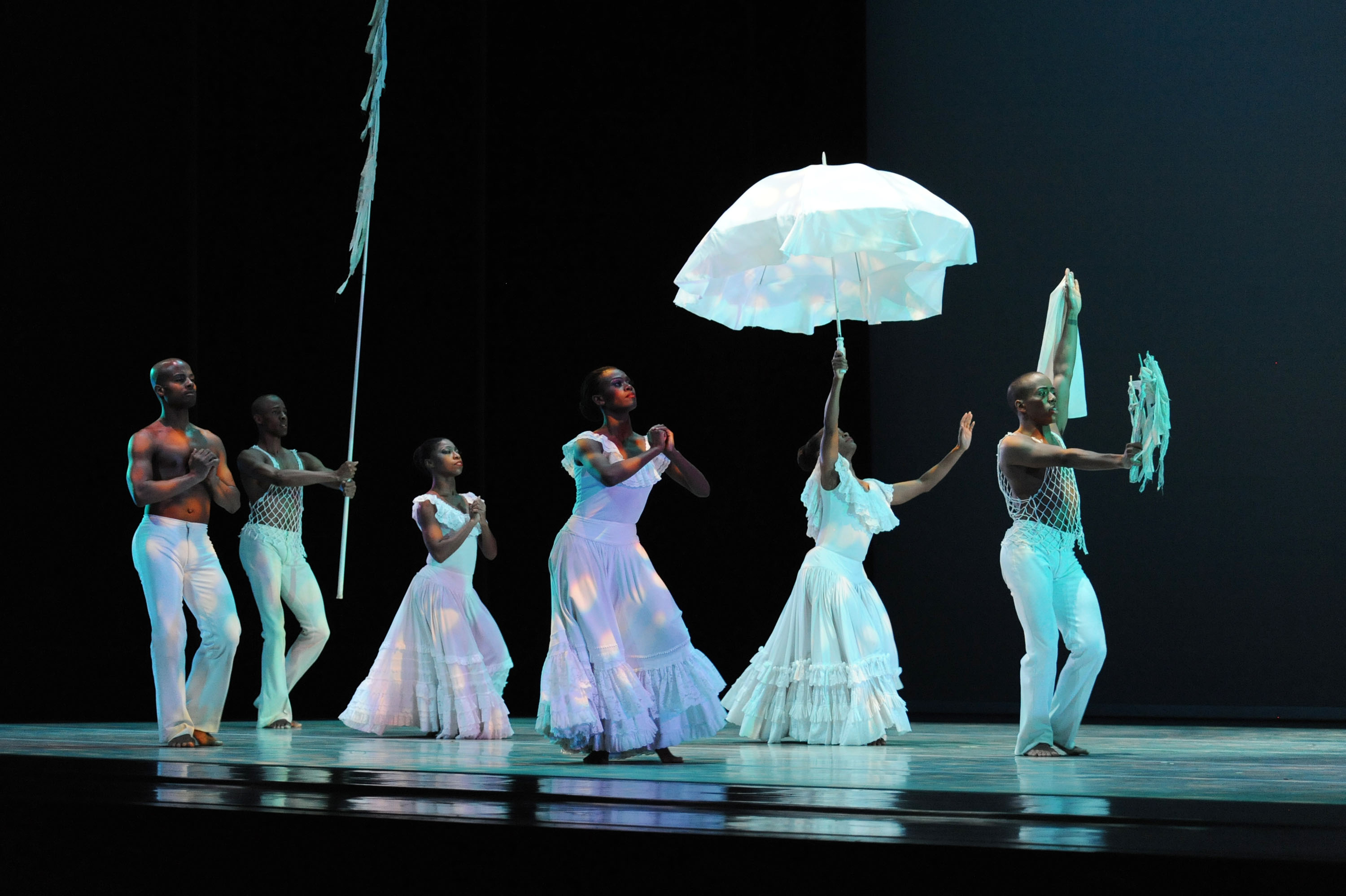
Alvin Ailey American Dance Theatre performs Alvin Ailey's Revelations. Adrienne Arsht Center for the Performing Arts, Miami, Florida

The United States Senate passed a resolution recognizing the artistic and cultural contributions of AAADT amidst the 50th Anniversary (2011) of the first performance of the Ailey classic Revelations. That same year, Robert Battle, artistic director (2011-2023), established a New Directions Choreography Lab to nurture emerging artists.

In 2014, AAADT kicked off a fifty million dollar capital campaign, "Campaign for Ailey's Future," to support artistic, educational, and building expansion projects, and to honor outgoing board chair Joan Weill. Sandy Weill, Joan Weill's husband, provided a lead gift of sixteen million dollars to the campaign.AAADT also received a twenty million dollar gift in 2021 from MacKenzie Scott to support its "Dancing Forward" initiatives.

Also in 2014, Clark Center NYC was established by former faculty and students (including Loretta Abbott) of Clark Center for the Performing Arts, in order to "to remember, honor and preserve the history of this seminal and vital arts organization".

In 2024, the Whitney Museum unveiled "Edges of Ailey," the first major museum exhibition to survey the artistry of Alvin Ailey and AAADT. In November 2024, AAADT announced that Alicia Graf Mack, a former Alvin Ailey company member and the dean and director of the dance division at Juilliard, will take over as AAADT artistic director on July 1, 2025.

=== International presence ===
Ailey founded the Alvin Ailey American Dance Theatre in 1958, gathering 35 dancers for eight concerts at 92nd Street. The dancers performed Blues Suite to a positive reception to the New York crowd. Building off this reception, the company toured the world, in Europe, Australia, and Southeast Asia. In 1966, the company performed at the First World Festival of Negro Arts in Dakar, Senegal, where the audience responded positively. Ailey’s choreographic strategy at the time was to provide a structure for the dancers while demanding improvisation and insisting on character over technique. Additionally, Ailey actively rejected the “black dance” label, contending that “good dance” transcends racial categorization.

Despite enthusiastic audiences internationally, the company endured considerable institutional hardships. The cost of living stranded dancers in Barcelona, and many lived in Milan brothels without pay, so Ailey reinvested his personal earnings from Broadway directly into the company, demonstrating his devotion. Following Ailey’s death in 1988, the board appointed Judith Jamison company director, and she honored his legacy by eventually creating a school on 61st street, preserving his global vision.

In 1970, the U.S. State Department sent the Alvin Ailey American Dance Theater on a tour of the Soviet Union to represent the United States and perform choreography aligned with U.S. democratic values. The U.S. State Department and President Eisenhower created an emergency fund for international affairs to finance performances abroad as part of a massive propaganda initiative against Soviet communism. The American government initially excluded Black performers from consideration. However, the Soviets regarded racial discrimination as a major geopolitical asset against the US, so the United States' choice of modern dance as its distinct national art form was an act of damage control.

Chosen to represent the U.S., the AAADT became the first American modern dance company to ever perform in the Soviet Union. In their performance, they presented Revelations, which countered what the U.S. government sought to convey worldwide. The act was about African American self-determination and overcoming structural obstacles in American society. In response, the audience in Leningrad, now Saint Petersburg, gave a 23-minute standing ovation because Ailey's choreography validated their own critique of American racism. The U.S. government sent AAADT to the Soviet Union to obscure the U.S.'s racism, but the reception of their performances abroad illustrates the political power of the dance company.

Expanding on this international presence, when the Alvin Ailey American Dance Theater brought Black art to Soviet stages, it entered an existing transnational terrain. African American artists such as Langston Hughes, Paul Robeson, and W.E.B. Du Bois traveled to the Soviet Union and formed relationships there, in Hughes's own words, transforming Black selfhood "from the ground up" by rethinking racial identity outside the constraints of America’s racial hierarchy. African-American leaders’ presence in the USSR itself was a political act, as the Soviet Union offered Black Americans a context that shaped their sense of status and dimensions of public life that American society contested. The performances by the Alvin Ailey American Dance Theater mirrored this dynamic.

== Alvin Ailey Dance Foundation ==
The Alvin Ailey Dance Foundation is the largest modern and contemporary dance organization in the United States and consists of the Alvin Ailey American Dance Theater, Ailey II, The Ailey School, Ailey Camp, Ailey Extension, and Ailey Arts In Education and Community Programs.

=== Performances and tours ===
The Alvin Ailey American Dance Theater, a prominent dance company and global arts institution, has performed for audiences around the world. The following is a sample of significant AAADT performances, residencies, and tours:

- 1962: Southeast Asia and Australia tour, as part of President John F. Kennedy’s international program for cultural presentations
- 1963: International Arts Festival, Rio de Janeiro, Brazil
- 1964: Théâtre des Champs-Elysées, Paris; and Shaftesbury Theatre, London
- 1966: World Festival of Negro Arts, Dakar, Senegal
- 1967: 10-country tour of Africa, including Democratic Republic of the Congo, Ghana, and Kenya, for the U.S. State Department
- 1968: Edinburgh Festival, earning awards for "best choreographer" and "best company"

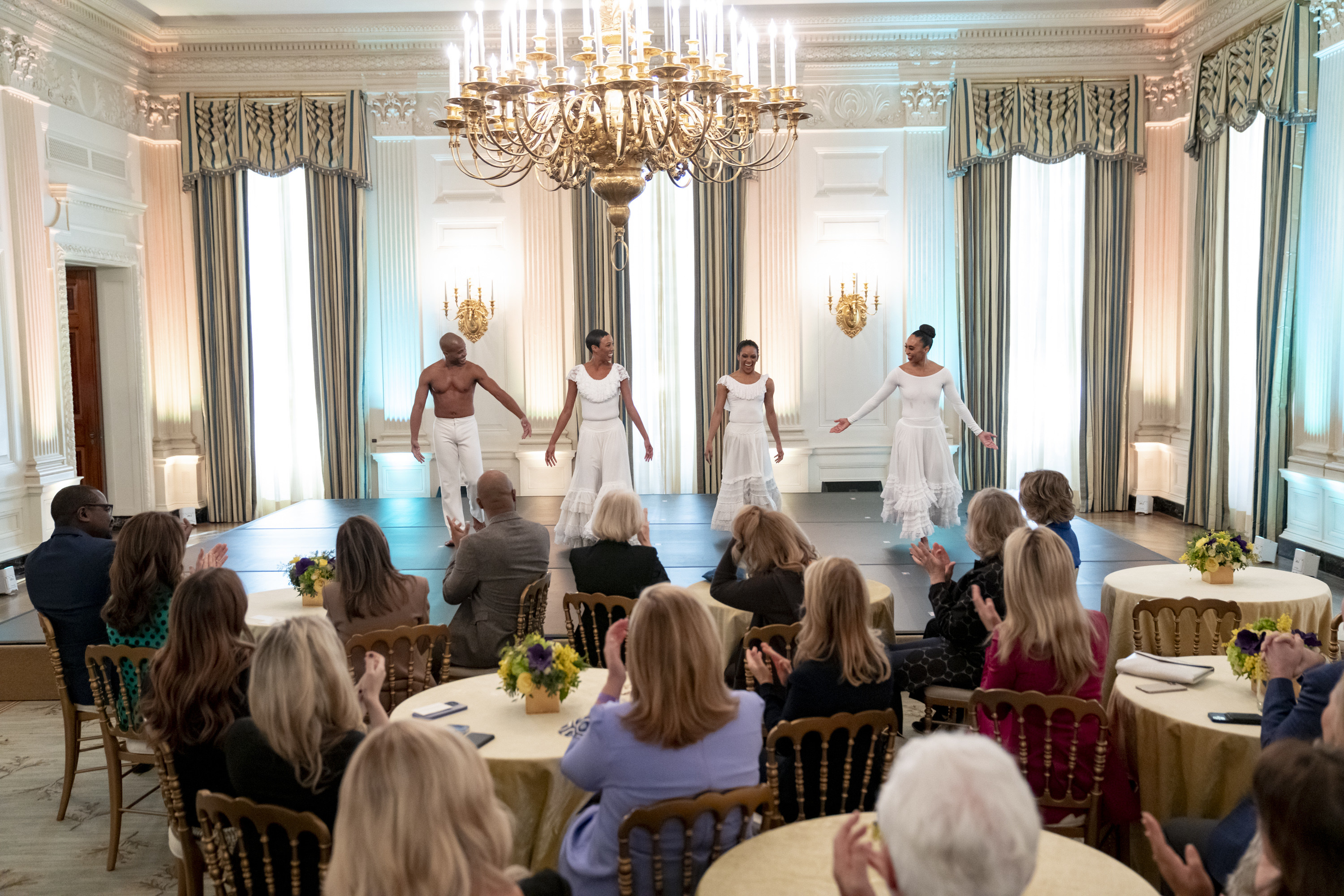
Alvin Ailey American Dance Theater, National Governors Association Winter Meeting, State Dining Room, White House, February 10, 2023

- 1968: President Lyndon B. Johnson, White House
- 1970: International Dance Festival, Paris
- 1970: Soviet Union (USSR)
- 1977: President Jimmy Carter, White House
- 1978: Prince of Morocco, New Year’s Day
- 1985: China
- 1989: Grand Palais Theatre, Paris, in celebration of the Bicentennial of the French Revolution
- 1990: Fifth Annual Formosa Arts Festival, Taiwan
- 1994: Inaugural gala for President Bill Clinton
- 1997: South Africa
- 2003: White House State Dinner honoring President Mwai Kibaki of Kenya
- 2004: China and Singapore
- 2015: Johannesburg and Cape Town, South Africa
- 2022: 1st Annual BAAND Together Dance Festival, Lincoln Center, the first shared performance of AAADT, American Ballet Theatre, Ballet Hispánico, Dance Theatre of Harlem, and New York City Ballet.
- 2023: National Governors Association Winter Meeting at the invitation of First Lady Jill Biden, White House

== Choreographers ==
Alvin Ailey created seventy-nine dances for the company that bears his name. He maintained that the company was not solely a repository for his choreography, and sought the contributions from other choreographers. Today, AAADT has a repertory of nearly three hundred works by more than one hundred choreographers, including:

- Kyle Abraham
- Karole Armitage
- Aszure Barton
- Talley Beatty
- Maurice Béjart
- Mauro Bigonzetti
- Hope Boykin
- Camille A. Brown
- Ronald K. Brown
- Jacqulyn Buglisi
- John Butler
- Donald Byrd
- Hope Clarke
- Merce Cunningham
- Asadata Dafora
- Rovan Deon
- Gary Deloatch
- Kervin Douthit-Boyd
- Ulysses Dove
- Katherine Dunham
- Garth Fagan
- George Faison
- Louis Falco
- Francesca Harper
- Rennie Harris
- Lucas Hoving
- Abdur-Rahim Jackson
- Bill T. Jones
- Alonzo King
- Pauline Koner
- Jiri Kylian
- Rael Lamb
- José Limón
- Lar Lubovitch
- Brian McDonald
- Wayne McGregor
- Dianne McIntyre
- Donald McKayle
- Elisa Monte
- Robert Moses
- Jennifer Muller
- Ohad Naharin
- David Parsons
- Rudy Perez
- Eleo Pomare
- Dwight Rhoden
- Kelvin Rotardier
- Paul Sanasardo
- Gustavo Ramirez Sansano
- Hofesh Shechter
- Michael Smuin
- Lynne Taylor-Corbett
- Paul Taylor
- Twyla Tharp
- Hans van Manen
- Christopher Wheeldon
- Billy Wilson
- Kris World
- Jawole Willa Jo Zollar

The company keeps Alvin Ailey's works, including Revelations (1960), Night Creature (1974) and Cry (1971), in continuous performance. Memoria (1979) was one of Alvin Ailey's balletic pieces, with long lines and a clear technical style different from his usual jazz character style of swirling patterns, strong, driving arm movements, huge jumps, and thrusting steps. This dance was later adopted into the repertory of the Royal Danish Ballet. Cry is a three-part, 17-minute solo created for Judith Jamison. It was meant to pay homage to "all Black women everywhere, especially our mothers" and can be seen as a journey from degradation to pride, defiance, and survival.

== Diverse Repertoire ==
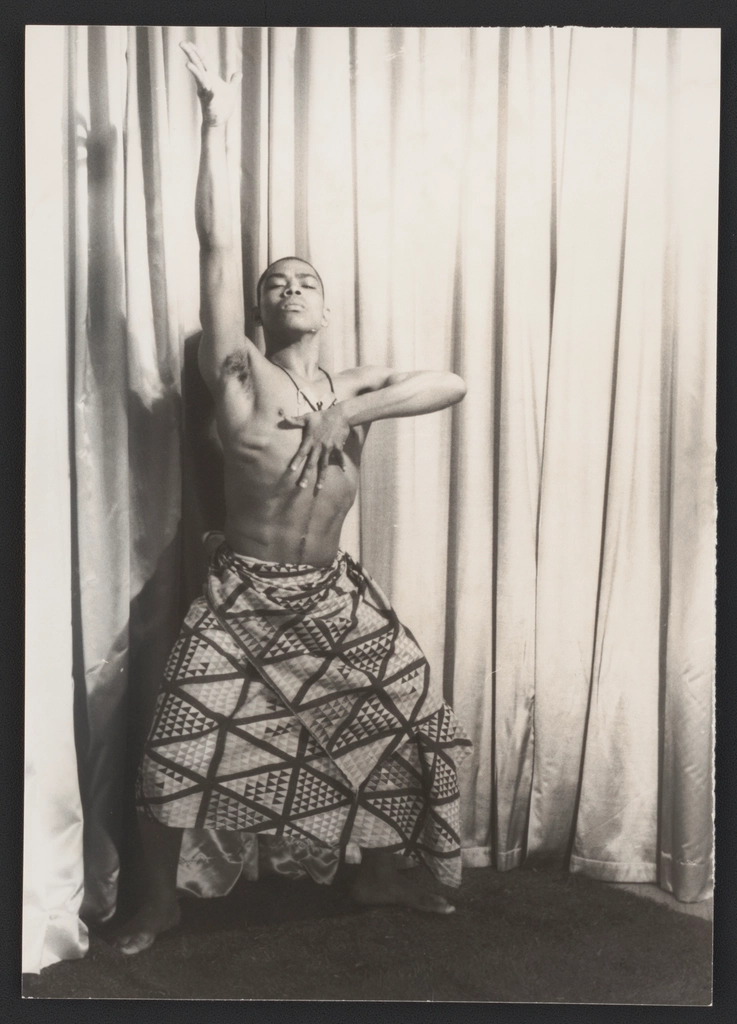
This is a portrait of Alvin Ailey, wearing a clothing item rooted in African diasporic tradition and used in AAADT's diverse dance performances.

The Alvin Ailey American Dance Theater has distinguished itself from other modern dance companies by presenting a diverse collection of works by a variety of choreographers, all working to advance Alvin Ailey’s mission. His mission was to serve as a professional home for artists of the African diaspora. The company trained artists across dance disciplines, including classical ballet and 1950s jazz-style dance, to be able to use a variety of styles to tell a range of stories, often rooted in African American life.

Specifically, Ailey required all the company's dancers to take daily classes in these disciplines, most notably ballet, jazz, and Afro-Caribbean dance. He believed that his dancers and the performances should not be limited; therefore, many pieces within the theater drew on both traditions of the Black diaspora and techniques from genres that originated in Europe. This led to the creation of multiculturally inspired dances, such as the choreography in Night Creature, in 1974, a piece about 1920s Harlem. The critically acclaimed performance combines African American-inspired jazz dance with European-influenced ballet. Ailey accomplished this by incorporating angular heel-toe struts and sweeping waltz steps, in combination with partnered twists from social dance.

Another aspect of Ailey's diverse repertoire comes through the music that accompanied the dances, not just the dance style. For example, in 1971, Cry honored black women and featured both jazz and gospel songs by Alice Coltrane, Laura Nyro, and Chuck Griffin. This piece uses music to evoke emotions of pain and trouble, as well as triumph, drawing on the extensive range of Black-inspired music to encapsulate American Blackness through Judith Jamison.

Renowned dancers such as Lester Horton and Katherine Dunham also taught the dancers. These factors produced dancers capable of performing vastly different choreographies. This model created “composite bodies,” dancers who could tell the stories and identities of their culture through a variety of performances on stage. Over time, a more recognizable “Ailey style” emerged, which combined these diverse repertoires of styles while embodying American Blackness coherently, no matter which movement the company displayed. In 1993, the company operated without a budget deficit, a feat unique among major American dance companies, demonstrating that the “Ailey style” was not only artistically groundbreaking but also institutionally viable for an underrepresented group in the United States of America.

== Additional Programs and Organizations ==
=== Ailey II ===
In 1974, Ailey created the Alvin Ailey Repertory Ensemble (later renamed Ailey II). In 1980, the second company and the Ailey School relocated to four new studios in a building on Broadway.

=== The Ailey School ===
The Ailey School was established in 1969, the same year the company moved to the Brooklyn Academy of Music. The Ailey School is an accredited institutional member of the National Association of Schools of Dance (NASD). The school is recognized by the U.S. Department of Education as an institution of higher education and is eligible to participate in Title IV programs.

In 1998, the Ailey School and Fordham College at Lincoln Center (FCLC), Fordham University launched a Bachelor of Fine Arts (BFA) degree program. The program is recognized as one of the preeminent BFA dance programs in the country.

=== AileyCamp ===
In 1989, Kansas City Friends of Alvin Ailey is founded and develops into the national AileyCamp program. By 2016, AileyCamp expanded to ten cities: Atlanta, GA; Baltimore, MD; Berkeley/ Oakland, CA; Chicago, IL; Kansas City, KS; Kansas City, MO; Miami, FL; New York, NY; Newark, NJ; and Seattle/Tacoma, WA.

In 2023, AileyCamp Atlanta launched a partnership as part of Atlanta Mayor Andre Dickens’ Year of the Youth initiative.

=== The Ailey Extension ===
The Ailey Extension was created in 2005. Ailey Extension offers instruction in more than 25 different dance and fitness techniques, including Ballet, Hip-Hop, Horton, House, Jazz, Masala Bhangra, Samba, West African, and Zumba.

== Joan Weill Center for Dance ==
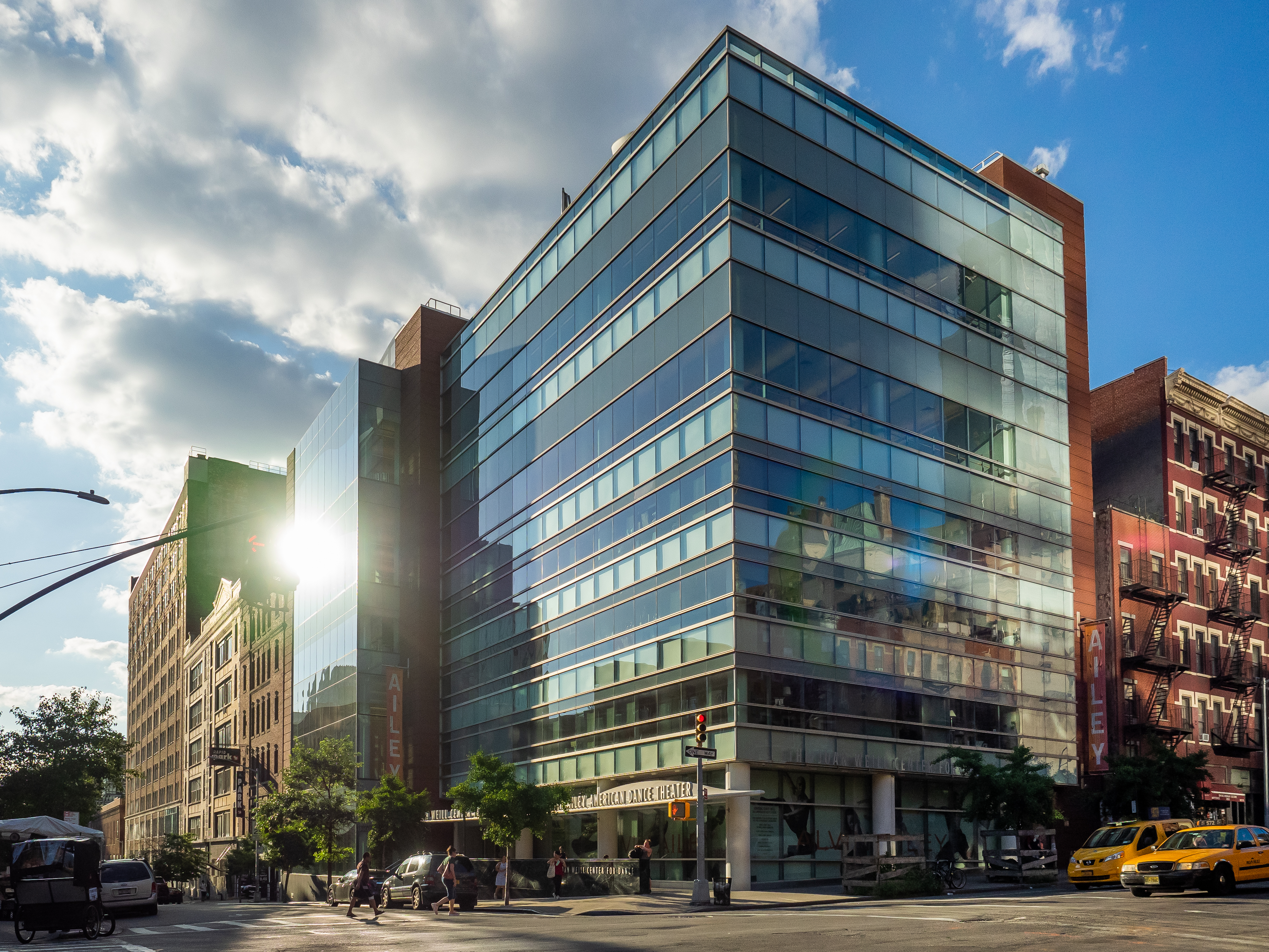
The Joan Weill Center for Dance 405 West 55th Street at Ninth Avenue New York City

Since 2005, the Ailey organization has been headquartered at the Joan Weill Center for Dance, which was originally designed as a 77,000 square-foot building. The Weill Center features state-of-the-art dance studios, a performance space with a seating capacity of 275 people, classrooms, a costume shop, physical therapy facilities, faculty and student lounges, and administrative offices.

In the late 1990s, following their Russia, France and Cuba tours and South Africa residency, AAADT's leadership determined that it needed a larger space for rehearsals, school performances, production materials, and offices. The board of trustees established a campaign steering committee to identify potential major donors. Joan Weill, who served fourteen years as chairwoman of the Alvin Ailey Dance Foundation, and her husband, Sandy Weill, co-chaired the building capital campaign, and donated a total of eighteen million dollars to the effort.

=== The Elaine Wynn and Family Education Wing ===
In 2017, AAADT unveiled The Elaine Wynn and Family Education Wing, a 10,000-square-foot expansion to the Weill Center. Elaine Wynn is a major donor to AAADT. The Wynn Wing adds three floors to Weill Center and features four additional dance studios, two new flexible classrooms, and administrative offices.

== Leadership ==
=== Artistic director ===
- Alvin Ailey (1931–1989), founder and artistic director, 1965-1989.
- Robert Battle, artistic director, 2011–2023.
- Judith Jamison (1943-2024), principal dancer, 1965-1989; artistic director emerita, 1989-2011.
- Matthew Rushing, principal dancer, 1992-2010; rehearsal director, 2010-2020; associate artistic director, 2020-2023; Interim Artistic Director, 2023-2024.
- Alicia Graf Mack, principal dancer, 2005-2008, and 2011-2014; artistic director, 2025-

=== Associate artistic director and rehearsal director ===
- Masazumi Chaya, dancer, 1972-1987, rehearsal director, 1988-1990, and associate artistic director, 1991-2019.
- Ronni Favors, Rehearsal Director

=== Ailey II ===
- Francesca Harper, artistic director, Ailey II, 2021-.
- Troy Powell, artistic director, Ailey II, 2012-2020, who was fired after allegations of sexual misconduct involving students and other young dancers surfaced online.
- Sylvia Waters, dancer, 1968-1974, and artistic director emerita, Ailey II, 1975-.

=== Ailey School ===
- Ana Marie Forsythe, faculty and Horton department chair, 2024 Awardee of Distinction, Dance Teacher
- Tracy Inman, co-director, Ailey School, 2010-.
- Denise Jefferson (1944-2010), director, Ailey School, 1984-2010.
- Pearl Lang, co-director, Ailey School, 1969-?
- Melanie Person, co-director, Ailey School, 2010-.

=== Board of trustees ===
The following is a partial list of trustees who have played a major role in AAADT's history.

- Simin N. Allison (-2024) and Herbert M. Allison (1943-2013), former members, board of trustees
- Katherine G. Farley, former member, board of trustees
- Bruce S. Gordon, former member and vice chair, board of trustees, 1999-?
- Barbara Jonas (1933-2018), former member, board of trustees, whose husband Donald Jonas made a donation in her honor to endow all performances of Revelations.
- Anthony S. Kendall, president, board of trustees, 2024
- Philip Laskawy, chairman(1994-?); chairman, executive committee (-2006-); chair emerita, board of trustees
- Debra L. Lee, president, board of trustees, 2014-2018
- Harold Levine (1922-2017), chair, board of trustees, 1989-1993
- Henry McGee, president (-2006-)
- Stanley Plesent (1926-2022), chair, board of trustees, 1973-1989
- Daria L. Wallach, chair, board of trustees, 2014-
- Joan Weill, chair, board of trustees, 2000-2014

=== Executive director ===
- Ivy Clarke (1916-1994), general manager / executive director, 1968-1975.
- Barbara B. Hauptman (1946-2024), executive director, 1994-1995.
- Michael Kaiser, executive director, 1990-1993.
- Sharon Gersten Luckman, who joined the company in 1992; executive director, 1995-2013.
- Bennett Rink, who joined the company in 1994; executive director, 2013-.

== Dancers ==
=== Alvin Ailey American Dance Theater ===
- Leonardo Brito
- Patrick Coker
- Shawn Cusseaux
- Sarah Daley-Perdomo
- Caroline T. Dartey
- Isaiah Day
- Coral Dolphin
- Solomon Dumas
- Mason Evans
- Samantha Figgins
- Sebastian Garcia
- James Gilmer
- Ashley Kaylynn Green
- Jacquelin Harris
- Yannick Lebrun
- Xavier Mack
- Renaldo Maurice
- Corrin Rachelle Mitchell
- Jesse Obremski
- Kali Marie Oliver
- Alisha Rena Peek
- Jessica Amber Pinkett
- Miranda Quinn
- Hannah Alissa Richardson
- Deidre Rogan
- Constance Stamatiou
- Christopher Taylor
- De'Anthony Vaughan
- Dandara Veiga
- Isabel Wallace-Green
- Christopher R. Wilson

=== Ailey II ===
- Kamani Abu, apprentice
- Carley Brooks
- Meredith Brown
- Jennifer M. Gerken
- Alfred L. Jordan II
- Xavier Logan
- Kiri Moore
- Corinth Moulterie
- Naia Neal, apprentice
- Xhosa Scott
- Adanna Smalls, apprentice
- Kaleb K. Smith, apprentice
- Kayla Mei-Wan Thomas
- Darion Turner
- Eric Vidaña
- Jordyn White

== Former dancers ==
A partial list of former Alvin Ailey dancers with their years in the company.

- Loretta Abbot
- Alvin Ailey
- Sarita Allen
- Guillermo A. Asca (1994-2014)
- Marilyn Banks
- Thea Nerissa Barnes (1972-?)
- Don Bellamy
- April Berry
- Olivia Bowman-Jackson (2001-2011)
- Jeroboam Bozeman
- Hope Boykin (2000-2020)
- Clifton Brown
- Olivia Brown
- Sean Aaron Carmon
- Debora Chase
- Masazumi Chaya
- Hope Clarke
- Courtney Brene Corbin
- Carmen De Lavallade
- Gary Deloatch
- Joan Derby
- Merle Derby
- Rosalyn Deshauteurs (2000-2006-?)
- Samuel Deshauteurs
- Ghrai DeVore
- Khilea Douglass
- Antonio Douthit
- Kervin Douthit-Boyd (2004-2015)
- Ulysses Dove
- Patrick Dupond, guest artist
- Linda-Denise Evans
- George Faison (1967-1970)
- Jay Fletcher
- Vernard J. Gilmore
- Ralph Glenmore
- Alicia Graf Mack
- Jacqueline Green (2011-2022)
- Daniel Harder
- Collin Heyward
- Gene Hobgood
- Nathaniel "Nat" Horne (1958-?)
- Herman Howell
- Zach Law Ingram (2004-2006-?)
- Kristen Irby
- Abdur-Rahim Jackson (2001-2006-?)
- Chris Jackson (2004-2006-?)
- Michael Jackson Jr
- Megan Jakel
- Judith Jamison
- Wesley Johnson
- Gwynenn Taylor Jones (2004-2006-?)
- Michael Joy
- Mari Kajiwara
- Margaret Larky
- Willy Laury (2004-2011)
- Bill Luther
- Roxanne Lyst (2004-2006-?)
- Amos J. Machanic, Jr. (1996-2011)
- Alicia Graf Mack
- Deborah Manning
- Minnie Marshall
- Clover Mathis
- Ashley Mayeux
- Michael Francis McBride
- Keith McDaniel
- Rachael McLaren (2006-2019)
- Leonard Meek
- Hector Mercado
- Chalvar Monteiro
- Ella Thompson Moore
- Christa Mueller
- Akua Noni Parker
- Danica Paulos
- Kenneth "Kenny" Pearl
- Belén Pereyra-Alem
- Harold Perrineau
- Joan Peters (1960s)
- Karine Plantadit
- Troy Powell
- Lucinda Ransom
- Nancy Redi
- Briana Reed (1998-2006-?)
- Dwight Rhoden
- Takako Asakawa Richards
- Desmond Richardson (1987-1994)
- Dorene Richardson
- Jamar Roberts (2002-2006-?)
- Samuel Lee Roberts
- Renee Robinson (1981-2012)
- Elizabeth Roxas
- Matthew Rushing(1992-2010)
- Uri Sands
- Solange Sandy (1994-2000)
- Wendy White Sasser
- Ramon Segarra
- Kanji Segawa
- Maxine Sherman
- Glenn Allen Sims (1997-2006-?)
- Linda Celeste Sims (1996-2006-?)
- Dwana Adiaha Smallwood (1995-2007)
- Stephen Smith
- Courtney Celeste Spears
- Estelle Spurlock
- Sarah Stackhouse
- Jermaine Terry
- Fana Tesfagiorgis
- Asha Thomas
- Michael Thomas
- Nasha Thomas
- Clive Thompson
- Mel Tomlinson
- Joyce Trisler
- James Truitte (1960-1968)
- Andre Tyson
- Desire Vlad
- Jacqueline Walcott (1958-1959)
- Sylvia Waters
- Myrna White-Russell
- Dereque Whiturs
- Dudley Williams
- Tina Monica Williams (2000-2006-?)
- Liz Williamson
- Dion Wilson (2001-2006-?)
- Richard Witter
- Donna Wood (1972-1985)
- Sara Yarborough
- Tina Yuan

== Awards and honors ==
- 1982: United Nations Peace Medal
- 2001: National Medal of Arts, Judith Jamison and Alvin Ailey Dance Foundation, the first dance organization to receive the honor
- 2014: Presidential Medal of Freedom, given posthumously by President Barack Obama
- 2015: National Arts and Humanities Youth Program Award, AileyCamp Miami, recognized by First Lady Michelle Obama
- 2023: Outstanding Company and Best Modern Choreography (Kyle Abraham, Are You in Your Feelings?), 2023 National Dance Awards, awarded by the The Critics' Circle (UK)
- 2024: AileyDance for Active Aging received a resolution from the Newark Municipal Council for its contributions to the senior community in Newark, New Jersey

== Cultural impact ==
The Alvin Ailey American Dance Theater has played a significant role in shaping modern dance and elevating the African American cultural experience through performance. From its founding in 1958, the company has brought traditions rooted in African American music, spirituality, and community to the mainstream dance environment, helping expand the narrative possibilities of modern choreography and influencing generations of dancers and choreographers.

Ailey's work Revelations is one of the most widely performed modern dance pieces worldwide. It explores the African American experience and is described as a celebration of heritage and a symbol of cultural storytelling. Choreographed by Ailey, the work draws on spirituality, gospel, and blues to depict the historical and emotional journey of African Americans from slavery to freedom. Its frequent inclusion in company programs around the world has made it a staple of AAADT's repertoire and a cultural touchstone for audiences and performers. Scholars have noted that the work's integration of African American musical and movement traditions helped legitimize these forms within concert dance and broadened the cultural vocabulary of modern choreography.

The legacy of AAADT extends to its broader role in shaping opportunities for dancers and choreographers from diverse backgrounds. From its early years as a predominantly African American company to its evolution into a multiracial ensemble, AAADT emphasizes both artistic excellence and representation, giving visibility to performers and creators who were often marginalized in mainstream dance circles. According to dance historians, Alvin Ailey's approach combined elements of African, jazz, and theatrical movement, influencing not only the repertoire of modern dance companies but also contributing to conversations about race, identity, and inclusion in the performing arts in general.

== See also ==
- Culture of New York City
- Masazumi Chaya
- Carmen De Lavallade
- Judith Jamison
- Revelations
