= Jeroboam Bozeman =

American dancer

Jeroboam Bozeman (/d͡ʒɛɹʌboʊˈhʌm ˈboʊzmən/ jeh-ruh-boh-uhm bowz-muhn) is an American professional dancer, most known for his work with the Alvin Ailey American Dance Theater.

== Early life ==
Bozeman grew up in Bedford-Stuyvesant, Brooklyn with his parents and six siblings. He has a fraternal twin. Bozeman was shy and quiet as a child. He learned American Sign Language to communicate. He took an interest in playing Double Dutch, despite being labeled "girly". Bozeman was physically attacked by peers for his love of movement. He pursued taekwondo classes at Von King Cultural Arts Center, where he discovered older kids learning dance.

Bozeman saw his first Ailey performance in the 5th grade and found the talent enchanting. He learned dance in middle school at the Ronald Edmonds Learning Center, and studied posters from the Ailey company decorating his instructor's studio. Some of Bozeman's instructors were former members of the company.

At age 14, Bozeman temporarily quit dance due to having to move to a homeless shelter with his family in the Bronx. At age 16, his family moved back to Brooklyn. At 17, he was turned down for a summer program at the Ailey school, but joined The Philadelphia Dance Company. At 19, he was granted full scholarships to attend the Joffrey Ballet School and Dance Theatre of Harlem. He was accepted to the Alvin Ailey American Dance Theater in 2013, after auditioning with them for a fifth time.

== Career ==
Bozeman danced with The Philadelphia Dance Company for three years. Afterwards, he moved to Seattle to join Spectrum Dance Theater, before being hired to dance with Ailey II. After one year, he was hired to dance with the main company.

In 2015, The New York Times wrote, "Jeroboam Bozeman, whose broad shoulders and velvety fluidness give him a singular, rugged grace, has been having a breakout season with Alvin Ailey American Dance Theater. So far, he has triumphed in lead roles in works by Robert Battle and Rennie Harris. His Sinner Man variation in the company’s signature Revelations was reckless, desperate, taut. Many Ailey dancers know how to sell a dance with sizzle, and that’s fine, but Mr. Bozeman’s steely performances are more of a slow burn, and that’s even better."

In 2016, Bozeman performed as a guest artist with The Royal Ballet. In 2017, he danced in Ailey's Exodus, about which Palm Beach Daily News wrote, "Bozeman is mesmerizing in this work, equally for the precision of his movement and his commitment to the gravitas of the message." D.C. Theater Arts wrote, "His movements are powerful and commanding and he creates a strong anchor point amongst the chaos."

In 2018, he made Dance Magazine's 25 to Watch list. In 2019, his performance of Robert Battle's "Juba" with three colleagues was broadcast on NBC Nightly News. In 2022, Bozeman danced the duet Twin Cities, with Ghrai DeVore-Stokes, inspired by Duke Ellington. In 2023, Bozeman danced the lead in Ailey's Survivors, depicting the struggles of Apartheid.

With the Ailey company, Bozeman dances and teaches dance around the world.
