= Loretta Abbott =

American actress and dancer (1933–2016)

- Born: Loretta Agatha Abbott; March 1, 1933; New York City, New York, U.S.
- Died: May 6, 2016 (aged 83)
- Education: Hunter College
- Occupations: Dancer, Choreographer, Actress, Dance teacher

Loretta Agatha Abbott (March 1, 1933 – May 6, 2016) was an American educator, dancer, choreographer, singer, director, dance captain, and actress. She was an early member and foundation builder for the Alvin Ailey Dance Company. Having worked with the Clark Center for the Performing Arts from 1959 to 1989, Abbott was a co-founder of Clark Center NYC, set up to honour the legacy of the organization.

== Early life and education ==
Loretta Agatha Abbott was born on March 1, 1933 and grew up in Harlem, New York City, New York. Her training started at the age of five taking piano, voice, and dance classes. She studied with dance with Ruth Williams and her tap teacher was Henry LeTang. She performed as a child in talent shows in Harlem with the Ella Gordon's Peter Pan Kiddies. She lived her entire life in Harlem in a brownstone that her father Alfred Bruce Abbott bought in 1932. Her father was from Panama, and her mother Agatha was from Jamaica.

She graduated from Hunter College in New York City, and had a short career as a kindergarten teacher in Harlem at Public School 90.

== Career ==
Abbott was involved in dance for over 70 years. She mastered many techniques in dance, ballet, modern dance, and ethnic. She is well known for her work with Alvin Ailey. He was a pioneer in African American modern dance in the 1960s. She was Ailey's partner in his masterpiece dance piece Revelations prior to his retirement in 1964. Abbott and Al Perryman performed in the Tony Award-winning musical Purlie on Broadway. Her theater credits include The Amen Corner (written by James Baldwin), and the musical Amen Corner, choreographed by Perryman. She was a dancer, dance captain, and choreographic assistant with Amen Corner. In concert performances she partnered with Ailey and Perryman.

In 1960, she appeared in the Lenox Hill Playhouse production of Howard Richardson and William Berney's Dark of the Moon, directed by Vinnette Justine Carroll. Abbott studied with and worked with many of the pioneers of modern dance, ballet, and dance institutions. She studied with Charles Weidman. She was a founding member of the New Dance Group and studied at the Clark Center for the Performing Arts (founded by Alvin Ailey and Thelma Hill in 1959 who served from 1960 to 1963. ). At the Clark Center, she studied with Thelma Hill, Pepsi Bethel, and James Truitte. At the Clark Center, Abbott was able to work with many aspiring choreographers, such as Walter Nicks, Talley Beatty, Geoffrey Holder, Eleo Pomare, Fred Benjamin, Donald McKayle, and Al Perryman. Abbott performed in numerous theatrical productions, including Two Gentlemen of Verona, Raisin, Porgy and Bess, Amen Corner, and Liza with a Z. She appeared in The Wiz. She had her own one woman show touring company.

She worked with many choreographers and dancers, including Fred Benjamin, Jean-Léon Destiné, George Faison, Martin Gordon, Louis Johnson, John Parks, Al Perryman, Michael Peters, Carmen de Lavallade, Abdel Salaam, Otis Sallid, Paul Sanasardo, and Andy Torres. She performed as a featured dancer for the Eleo Pomare Dance Company.

Abbott was an founding member of the George Faison Universal Dance Experience in the 70s. She worked with him throughout her life. She spent most of her life as a performer, supporter of the arts, and worked with many budding choreographers at the beginning of their careers in the dance world of arts. Abbott worked as a choreographer, a dancer, and guest lecturer with the Avodah Dance Ensemble in New York City. She assisted in the creation of "Let My People Go", a praise dance.

Abbott was still dancing in her 80s with the Phoenix Project, a project with the Dances for a Variable Population in New York City, a group of dancers in their 70s, 80s, and 90s and a citywide project that celebrates the beauty of aging and dance.

== Death and legacy ==
In 2013/2014, Abbott was a founding member of Clark Center NYC, which was set up to honour the legacy of the Clark Center for the Performing Arts.

Abbott died on May 6, 2016.

== Awards ==
- AUDELCO Recognition Awards for Excellence in Black Theatre 2013 – 2014 Special Achievement Award

== Performances ==
=== Television ===
- Good Times (TV series), The Rent Party (1976), Dances staged by Loretta Abbott.
- Purlie, Television Production (1981), (Ensemble)

=== Film ===
- See No Evil, Hear No Evil with Gene Wilder and Richard Pryor
- Film version of The Wiz (film)

=== Stage productions ===
- A Raisin in the Sun, (Musical, Off-Broadway Production), Jul 23, 1986 - Sep 21, 1986; Union Square Theatre; Choreographer: Loretta Abbott
- Amen Corner, (Musical, Original Broadway Production), Nov 10, 1983 - Dec 04, 1983;, Performer: Loretta Abbott (Member of the Congregation, Dancer), Dance Captain and Choreographic Assistant: Loretta Abbott
- Porgy and Bess, (Musical, Opera, Revival), Apr 07, 1983 - May 15, 1983; Performer: Loretta Abbott (Ensemble)
- Reggae, (Musical, Original), Mar 27, 1980 - Apr 13, 1980; Performer: Loretta Abbott [Ensemble]
- Raisin, (Musical, Original) Oct 18, 1973 - Dec 07, 1975; Performer: Loretta Abbott [Victim]
- Raisin, National Tour (1975), Victim
- Raisin, Original Broadway Production (1973), Victim
- Raisin, World Premiere (1973), Ensemble
- The Two Gentlemen of Verona, (Musical, Comedy, Original Broadway Production), Dec 01, 1971 - May 20, 1973; Performer: Loretta Abbott (Citizen of Verona and Milan)
- The King and I, Jones Beach Marine Theatre Production (1972), (Ensemble)
- Purlie, (Musical, Comedy, Original Broadway Product), Mar 15, 1970 - Nov 06, 1971; Performer: Loretta Abbott (Dancer)
- La Strada (Musical, Original Broadway Production), Dec 14, 1969 - Dec 14, 1969; Performer: Loretta Abbott (Ensemble)
- Peer Gynt (Musical, Off-Broadway Production), Jul 8, 1969 - Aug 2, 1969; Delacorte Theater; Performer: Loretta Abbott (Dance Ensemble)
- Hallelujah, Baby!, National Tour (1968), Ensemble, Cutie
