= Ogelala (Schulhoff) =

Ogelala "Ballettmysterium" Op. 53 is a one act ballet in 13 parts, written by Czechoslovak composer Erwin Schulhoff in 1923. It premiered on November 21, 1925 in Dessau, in Saxony-Anhalt.

== Conception and analysis ==
The dance subject is about a pre-Columbian Mexican warrior. The composition combines elements of jazz, native American battle cries, and Central European expressionism.

== Images ==
1. Kampf
2. In Fesseln
3. Im Pueblo Konig Ivas
4. Fesseltanz
5. Pantomime – Das Urteil
6. Schädeltanz
7. Das Leid Ivalas
8. Ivalas Tanz
9. Siegestanz
10. Liebestanz
11. Sexualtanz
12. Waffentanz
13. Opfertanz

== Legacy ==
The composition, like others of Schulhoff's works, fell into obscurity outside of his native Czechoslovakia until recent decades. It received its first recording under Vaclav Neumann and the Czech Philharmonic in 1987. And it received its US premiere by James Conlon and the Aspen Chamber Symphony in 2006.

Choreographer Robert Battle created a dance based on the composition in 2007. The dance was later performed by the Alvin Ailey American Dance Theater.

== Discography ==
- Vaclav Neumann with the Czech Philharmonic Orchestra, (Panton, 81 0674-1012, 1987)
- Michail Jurowski with the German State Philharmonic of Rhineland-Palatinate, (cpo 999 323-2, 1995).
- Oliver von Dohnányi with the Saarbrücken Radio Symphony Orchestra, Saarländischer Rundfunk 1993, (Arte Nova Classics, 74321 27802 2, 1995).

== See also ==
List of ballets by title
