= ASFB =

ASFB may refer to:

- Australian Society for Fish Biology, a scientific organisation based in Australia
- ASF Bobo Dioulasso, a football club in Burkina Faso
- Aspen Santa Fe Ballet, an American contemporary dance company
- All Saved Freak Band, an American Christian rock band
