= Masazumi Chaya =

- Born: February 21, 1947 (age 79); Fukuoka, Japan
- Occupations: Choreographer, dancer
- Years active: 1972–present

Masazumi Chaya is a Japanese American dancer and choreographer. He was the associate artistic director of Alvin Ailey American Dance Theater (AAADT) from 1991 to 2020.

== Early life ==
Chaya was born to a doctor and nurse in Fukuoka, Japan, and trained in classical ballet. He found his way into theater as a dresser in his teenage years, and later as a musical theater dancer on stage and on television in Tokyo.

He moved to New York City in December 1970, after questioning whether he was getting work in Japan for being a male, instead of for his ability.

== Career ==
Chaya performed with AAADT for fifteen years beginning in 1972, becoming rehearsal director after retiring from dancing in 1987 and also serving as choreographic assistant to Alvin Ailey before Ailey's death in 1989. Chaya was named AAADT's associate artistic director in 1991 by Judith Jamison. From 1991 to 2020, Chaya served as Associate Artistic Director of the Company.

Chaya has staged and re-staged various Ailey works, rehearsed dancers, and taught company class for AAADT. He primarily teaches Ailey dances that he has performed.

Chaya has focused on maintaining the spirit of Ailey's dances with today's performers, who have generally not experienced the same life challenges as Ailey's dancers of the past. He's credited with providing continuity to AAADT over the years.

Former director Judith Jamison referred to him as the "miracle of this company," who "can remember details and dances like no other."

=== Ballet stagings ===
- Alvin Ailey's Flowers for the State Ballet of Missouri 1990
- Alvin Ailey's The River for the Royal Swedish Ballet 1993, Ballet Florida 1995, National Ballet of Prague 1995, Pennsylvania Ballet 1996 and Colorado Ballet 1998

=== Ballet re-stagings ===
- The Mooche for AAADT
- The Stack-Up for AAADT
- Episodes for AAADT
- Bad Blood for AAADT
- Hidden Rites for AAADT
- Urban Folk Dance for AAADT
- Witness for AAADT
- The River for North Carolina Dance Theatre and Julio Bocca's Ballet Argentina
- Blues Suite for AADT
- Judith Jamison's Hymn for AADT
