= Mari Kajiwara =

American dancer 1952–2001

- Born: Mari Kajiwara; New York City, New York, United States
- Education: High School of Performing Arts
- Occupations: Dancer, rehearsal director
- Employer: Batsheva Dance Company
- Style: Contemporary dance
- Spouse: Ohad Naharin

Mari Kajiwara (born in 1952 in New York City, died in 2001 on December 25 in Tel-Aviv) was an American dancer, a leading member of Alvin Ailey American Dance Theater, the Ohad Naharin Dance Company, and the Batsheva Dance Company. She died of cancer.
