= Desmond Richardson =

American dancer, actor and artistic director

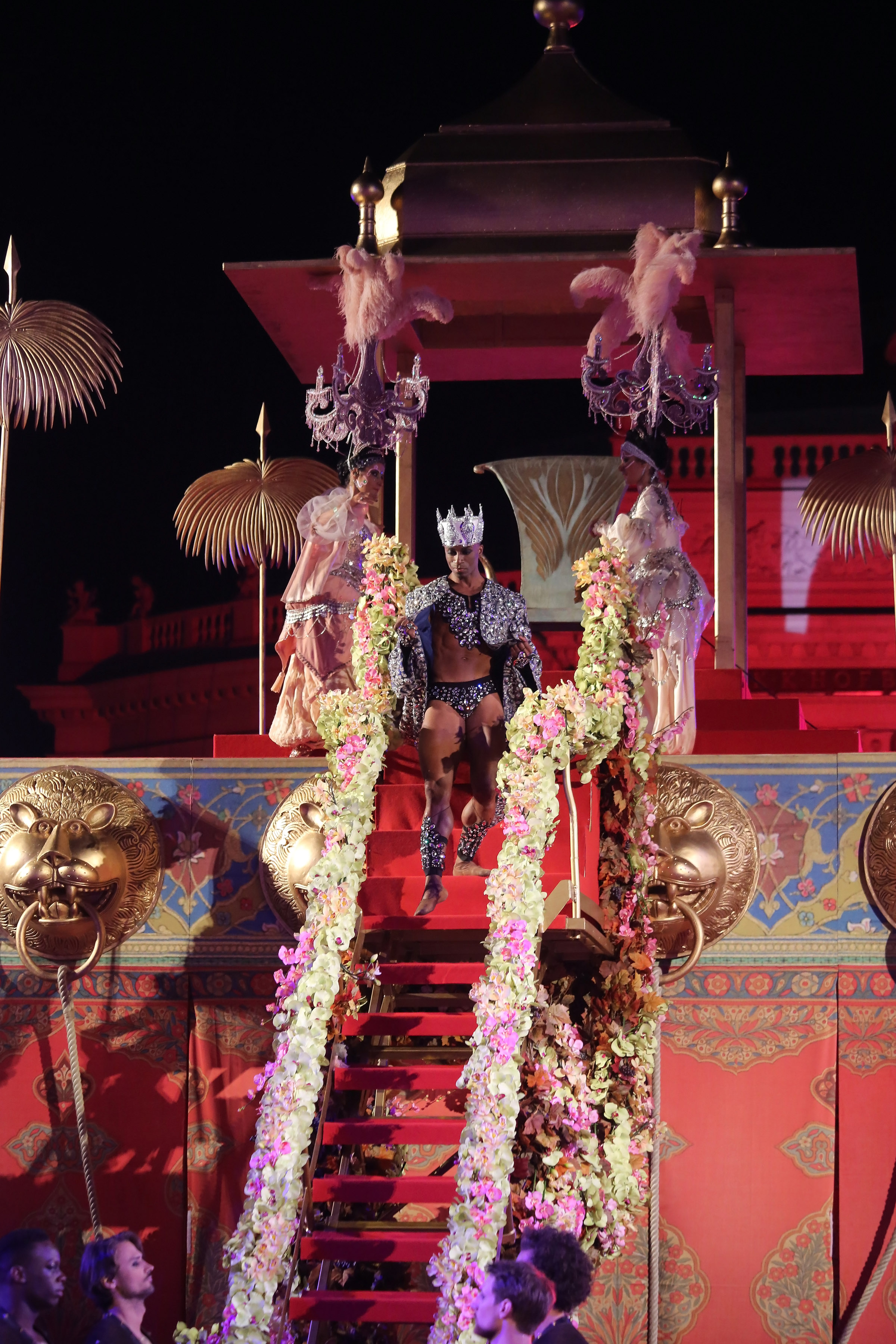
Desmond Richardson, the opening of Life Ball 2013

Desmond Richardson is an American dancer, actor and co-founder, and co-artistic director of Complexions Contemporary Ballet. He has mastered a wide range of dance forms including hip hop, classical, modern, classical ballet, and contemporary ballet.

He remained the principal dancer at Alvin Ailey American Dance Theater from 1987 to 1994.

== Life and career ==
Born in 1968 and raised in Queens, NY, Richardson discovered dance at a block party at the age of 10. His grandmother was the choir directress of their church and played piano, while his father was a rhythm and blues musician with the group The Manhattans. Richardson auditioned for the High School of the Performing Arts, where he trained in classical ballet technique and modern dance.

The next year, he auditioned for the Alvin Ailey American Dance Center (1983-1986) and received a full scholarship to study under the tutelage of Walter Raines, Robert Christopher, Denise Jefferson, Penny Frank, and Ronald Brown, and a host of other dance luminaries. He also received a merit scholarship to the Internationale Akademie des Tanzes in Köln, Germany (1984-1985) and was the recipient of a Presidential Scholar Award for the Arts (1986) from YoungArts. In 1986, he was invited him to become a member of Ailey II. Richardson then danced with Alvin Ailey American Dance Theater's main company as a principal dancer from 1987 to 1994 before starting his own company with fellow Ailey dancer, Dwight Rhoden. In his eight years with the company, Richardson danced works by José Limón, John Butler, Elisa Monte, Billy Wilson and many others.

In 1994, Complexions Contemporary Ballet was formed by Desmond Richardson and Dwight Rhoden. The company sought to diverge from the hetero-normative Black masculinity of the "Soul" aesthetic that was cultivated in companies such as the Alvin Ailey American Dance Theater. The company, rather, produced its own "Post-Soul" aesthetic rooted in Black exploration and individual eccentricity. Through Richardson's and Rhoden's direction, Complexions introduced heterogeneity into American concert dance with their emphasis on gender ambivalence and the plurality of race, sexuality, and dance formality.

At the same time as starting his own company, Richardson joined the Frankfurt Ballet in 1994, which was under the direction of William Forsythe.

In 1997, he joined the American Ballet Theatre where he performed the lead role in the company's production of Othello and quickly was promoted to become the first Black principal dancer since the inception of the company. Aiding in the transformation of ballet from a predominately white form, Richardson performed many other lead roles to critical acclaim.

In 1998, Richardson joined the premiere cast of the Broadway musical Fosse for which he received a 1999 Tony Award Nomination. He has also appeared on Broadway in the musicals The Look of Love: The songs of Burt Bacharach, City Center Encores of "House of Flowers," Movin' Out, and most recently, the Tony-winning hit show After Midnight.

Richardson has performed as a guest artist with several world-renowned companies including the Swedish Opera Ballet, the Washington Ballet, Teatro at La Scala, and the San Francisco Ballet.

He has appeared on TV shows as a celebrity performer and choreographer for SYTYCD, Amici(Italy), Israel(SYTYCD), and Australia(SYTYCD). He performed at Larry Rosen's Jazz Roots where he and Grammy Artist Bobby McFerrin performed an impromptu improv to an astounded audience in Miami at the Adrienne Arsht Performing Arts Venue.

== Other projects ==
Richardson has worked in TV, film, and video in the United States and abroad.

He performed with Michael Jackson in his 30th-anniversary celebration at Madison Square Garden.

Additional performances include being a featured guest artist in the 71st Academy Awards live television presentation and a principal role in Debbie Allen's a dance/theatrical presentation, Soul Possessed, which had its world premiere at the John F. Kennedy Center for the Performing Arts in 1999.

Richardson is featured in Patrick Swayze's film, One Last Dance and the film version of the Oscar-winning Chicago.

On July 16, 2008, Richardson was featured as a choreographer on So You Think You Can Dance.

== Acting career ==
Richardson worked as an ensemble member in Chicago alongside Renée Zellweger and Catherine Zeta-Jones. He also appeared in High Strung Free: Dance alongside actors Harry Jarvis, Juliet Doherty, and Thomas Doherty. Richardson plays the role of Sammy, and "Fall To Rise" opposite Daphne Rubin-Vega, Katherine Crocker, and Tamara Tunie. He will also be featured in the HBO/MAX "The Other Two" series as Ted.
