= Joyce Trisler =

(1934–1979) dance teacher and choreographer

- Born: 1934; Los Angeles, California
- Died: October 13, 1979 (aged 44–45); New York, New York
- Education: University of California Los Angeles, Juilliard School
- Occupations: Dancer, choreographer, educator

Joyce Trisler (1934–1979) was an American modern dancer and choreographer.

== Biography ==
Trisler was born in 1934 in Los Angeles, California. She attended the University of California, Los Angeles.

Trisler started her career with the Lester Horton Dance Theater. She moved to New York City in the 1950s to study with Doris Humphrey and attended the Juilliard School, graduating in 1957. Trisler danced with the Juilliard Dance Theater from 1955 through 1959. She also danced with Alvin Ailey.

She established the Joyce Trisler Danscompany in the mid-1970s.

Trisler died on October 13, 1979, in New York City at the age of 45.

Ailey created Memoria in her honor. The ballet debuted at New York City Center in 1979.
