= Elisa Monte =

Elisa Monte (born May 23, 1946) is an American artistic director, choreographer, and dancer who founded Elisa Monte Dance in New York City. Monte's first choreographic work, Treading (1979), defined her as an important innovator and contributor to contemporary dance. Her signature style, recognized as "daring, intense, and passionate, is classical and highly athletic."

== Early life ==
Monte was born in Brooklyn, New York to Anthony Montemarano, a bookkeeper, and Elisa Montemarano. Both Monte and her older sister, Barbara, former Broadway performer, later shortened their surname to Monte.

Monte started her dance training in 1955 at the age of 9, studying ballet under the tutelage of Russian classical dancer Vladimir Dokoudovsky. Monte continued her ballet training through high school, taking classes at the School of American Ballet while attending the Professional Children's School for her formal education. Years later, Monte joined the professional dance world, beginning her modern dance studies with the Pearl Lang Dance Theater.

== Dance career ==
Monte made her professional debut dancing with Agnes DeMille in the 1957 Broadway revival of Carousel, but her modern dance debut was not until the late 60s when she performed with the Lar Lubovitch Dance Company. In 1974 Monte joined Martha Graham Dance Company, performing as a principal dancer in such classics as Seraphic Dialogue, Clytemnestra, Appalachian Spring, and O Thou Desire Who Art About to Sing. In 1977, Moses Pendleton, a founding member of Pilobolus Dance Theatre, invited Monte to join the company for their 1977–78 season, during which Monte created Molly's Not Dead with Pilobolus, foretelling her future career as a choreographer.

In 1979, Monte and fellow Graham dancer, David Brown, starred in her first choreographic work, Treading; created during a Graham workshop for the company. As the piece was performed around NYC, critics and audiences alike marveled at the new choreographer's work. Monte was praised for "tun[ing] in to the sensuousness of the music" to create an effect "as lulling at the music." One reviewer wrote, "Monte's choreography is a significant addition to post-modernist dance, as effective as it is unusual." This not only led to the formation of her company, but also established Monte as an important innovator and contributor to contemporary dance.

== Elisa Monte Dance ==
=== The Formation ===
In 1981, Monte formed Elisa Monte Dance (EMD) with the "conviction of bridging cultural barriers through the universal language of dance." Around the same time as the company's formation, legendary choreographer Alvin Ailey saw the performance of Treading and quickly brought the piece to his company, Alvin Ailey American Dance Theater; Monte was soon commissioned for a second piece for the Ailey Company, Pigs and Fishes, which debuted at City Center in 1982. She explained, "to me, pigs and fishes symbolize some of the basic things in life." Monte's jazzy, primal movements and swinging arcs of the pelvis produced "... a dance of great, almost violent energy... a bold exploration of space made by dancers pushing themselves beyond the bounce." The success of both pieces with the well-established Ailey Company helped launch EMD into the modern dance world, as well as concrete the friendship between Monte and her new mentor, Ailey.

In 1982, EMD was named Best Company at the International Dance Festival of Paris.

=== Monte/Brown Dance ===
As the company grew, Monte, with partner Brown as artistic director, created new works with a focus on diversity and multidisciplinary collaboration. A few years after the formation of the company, Monte and Brown married, and Brown began to choreograph new works for the company alongside Monte. In 1987, their daughter, Elia Monte-Brown, was born, and the formation of the family harmonized with the growth of the company: "For me, my work and my personal life are one thing. It's not two separate compartments to me at all. The art I do as a dancer-choreographer has always been who I am, and who I'm married to is who I am, and my child is who I am. So for me, it's all one picture." On June 27, 2020 she became a grandmother to Gaetana Jean.

In 1998, Monte changed the company's name to Monte/Brown Dance. Under this new name, the company continued to grow with new works by the artists. In 2002, Monte and Brown divorced, and the company returned to its original name, Elisa Monte Dance.

Rooted in sensuality and controlled, sustained energy, Monte's work is notable for its expansive range of movement; hers is a diverse movement vocabulary that refuses stylistic conformity. Monte often collaborates with artists in other disciplines, examples being: composers Glenn Branca, Richard Peaslee, Barbara Kolb, David Van Tieghem, Joe Dallarda; architects Todd Williams and Billie Tsien; visual artists Marisol who costumed Treading and set design for Next Wave’s commission of Set in Stone, and Philip Tsiaras; and photographer and close friend, Roy Volkmann, for whom the 1985 piece, Volkmann Suite, was named.

Since the Company's inception, Monte has choreographed more than 50 works danced by this company and others, including Boston Ballet, Alvin Ailey American Dance Theater, San Francisco Ballet, Les Grands Ballets Canadiens, Ballet Gulbenkian of Portugal, Teatro alla Scala Ballet, Philadanco, Dallas Black Dance Theatre, North Carolina Dance Theater, the Batsheva Dance Company of Israel, and the PACT Contemporary Dance Company of South Africa; and has served as choreographer-in-residence at Robert Redford's Sundance Institute, Southern Methodist University in Dallas, Texas, and New York University's Tisch School of the Arts. Monte was among the first choreographers awarded commission by the National Choreography Project. This resulted in Monte creating VII for VIII for the Boston Ballet.

She retired from Elisa Monte Dance in 2016. Elisa Monte Dance no longer exists.

== Choreography ==
- Treading (1979)
- Pell Mell (1981)
- Anima (1982)
- Pigs and Fishes (1982)
- Lifetime (1983)
- Indoors (1984)
- Set in Stone (1984)
- VII for VIII (1985)
- White Dragon (1985)
- Dreamtime (1986)
- Audentity (1987)
- Turtles Eat Bones (1987)
- Dextra Dei (1989)
- Split Personality (1989)
- The World Upside Down (1990) with David Brown
- Last Temptation (1991)
- Between Going and Staying (1992)
- Broken Journey (1992)
- Diamond Song (1993)
- Fatidic Embrace (1994) with David Brown
- Mnemonic Verses (1994) commissioned by Alvin Ailey American Dance Theater
- Vejle/Border Crossing (1994) with David Brown
- Feu Follet (1995) with David Brown
- New York Moonglow (1995)
- Sticks and Stones (1996) with David Brown
- Volkmann Suite (1996)
- Tears Rolling (1997)
- Hurricane Deck (1998)
- Spin (1998)
- Amor Fati (1999)
- Day's Residue (2000)
- Shattered (2000)
- Light Lies (2002)
- Lost Objects (2002)
- Shekhina (2004)
- A Woman's Way (2005)
- Via Sacra (2005)
- Hardwood (2006)
- Slope of Enlightenment (2007)
- Arrow's Path (2009)
- Zydeco, Zare (2009) with Tiffany Rea-Fisher and Joe Celej
- Continuum (2010)
- Vanishing Languages (2011)
- Unstable Ground (2012)
- Terra Firma (2013)
- Lonely Planet (2014)
