= Robert Moses' Kin =

American dance company

- Founded: 1995; 31 years ago in San Francisco Bay area, California
- Founder: Robert Moses
- Headquarters: San Francisco, California, USA
- Website: robertmoseskin.org

Robert Moses' Kin (also known as RMK Dance Company) is an American dance company known for artistic and choreographic innovation. It is founded in the San Francisco Bay Area in Northern California in 1995.

== Founder ==
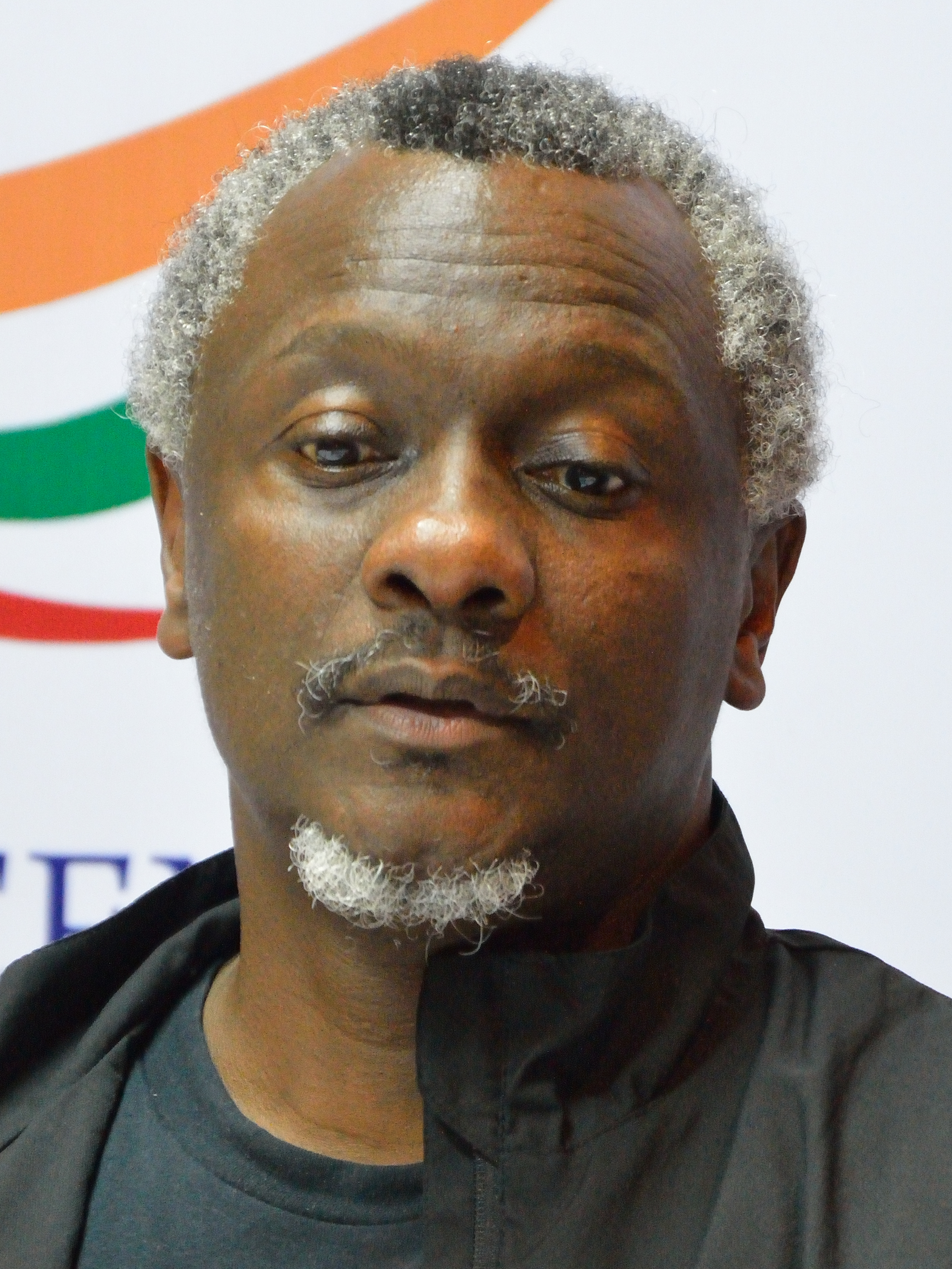
Robert Moses, founder of Robert Moses' Kin.

Before starting his own dance company, Robert Moses, the founder of the company, danced for many institutions like Twyla Tharp Dance, ODC/San Francisco, Long Beach Ballet, Walt Disney World Productions, and Gloria Newman Dance. Moses also works as faculty member at Stanford Dance Center. He is also a guest teacher at many other schools and universities in bay area. He also composed dance for films and theaters like the Lorraine Hansberry Theater, New Conservatory Theater, Los Angeles Prime Moves Festival, Olympic Arts Festival, and Black Choreographers Moving Toward the 21st Century.

== Style ==
The company performances are combination of athletic techniques, rhythmic complexity and gestural details. They are fusion of different styles and genres like jazz, light hip hop, gospel music and balletic movements. The company explores the issues of race, gender, class and other social topics like biographies.

== Performances ==
- Word of Mouth: It is a concert with words spoken by or about women from Mother Mary to the playwright Lorraine Hansberry.
- Woman Spelled This Way
- President's Daughter: This is the story of the offspring of Thomas Jefferson and his slave mistress, Sally Hemings. It tries to explore the contrast between private behavior and public posturing.
- 3 Quartets for 4 and the Second is Two: It is story less performance for two couples and a four-person corps dancing to Bach's F Minor's One and Two Harpsichord and number Five Minor music.
- Towards September : It is about the divine impulse behind artistic creation. It gives message about perils and pleasures of anti-social urges. It runs with the music ranging from church bells, groove and piano chords.
- Learning in Secret
- Dos Congio
- Approaching Thought: It displays acts of kindness and cruelty.
- Jokes That Can Get You Killed: It is a sarcastic play on current events, prejudices and phobias. It features animations of George Bush, Gavin Newsom and Anna Nicole Smith across a screen as Robert Moses and David Worm's score remixes screams and media absurdities like Don Imus.
- Reignforest: It is about human beings and the environment. Instead of just being ecological subject, it also shows how the ideologies and belief systems can reign over and suppress individuals with the forces affecting them.
- Lucifer's Prance: It is a dance performed for Philip Glass's opera Akhnaten. It consists contrasting impulses of stillness and turbulence.
- Blood in Time
- Deep River
- A Biography of Baldwin
- Solo Suite
- The Soft Sweet Smell of Firm Warm Things: It is work that captures the first blush of attraction.
- Cause

== Awards ==
- Awards for the NEA
- Isadora Duncan Dance Award for Best Choreography
- Bonnie Bird North American Choreography Award
- San Francisco Bay Guardian "Goldie"
- San Francisco Weekly "Black Box" Award.
