= Jennifer Muller =

American choreographer (1944–2023)

Jennifer Muller (October 16, 1944 – March 29, 2023) was a dance choreographer best known for her work with the eponymous company, Jennifer Muller/The Works, which she established in 1974.

Among other work throughout her long career, in 2011, Muller wrote and choreographed, The Spiral Show, the first Broadway musical to be produced in China.
