= Aspen Santa Fe Ballet =

American contemporary dance company

General information
- Name: Aspen Santa Fe Ballet
- Year founded: 1996
- Founders: Bebe Schweppe
- Website: www.aspensantafeballet.com

Artistic staff
- Artistic Director: Tom Mossbrucker

Other
- Official school: The School of Aspen Santa Fe Ballet

Aspen Santa Fe Ballet (ASFB) is a multi-faceted arts organization that nurtures and manifests the love of dance across a spectrum of programs for the cultural enrichment of Aspen, Colorado, and Santa Fe, New Mexico—and beyond.

The organization has a presentation program called "Aspen Santa Fe Ballet Presents", with summer and winter seasons that brings touring dance companies from around the world to both Aspen and Santa Fe. The Aspen Santa Fe Ballet has two official schools, one in Aspen, one in Santa Fe, and a year-round Mexican Folk Dance outreach program in both Colorado and New Mexico.

== History ==
In 1995, at the invitation of Aspen Ballet Company and School founder Bebe Schweppe, Joffrey dancers Jean-Philippe Malaty and Tom Mossbrucker moved from New York City to embark on a vision of creating a professional dance company based in Aspen.

The company started modestly with six dancers. Growth was organic. Friends in the field – Gerald Arpino, Trey McIntyre, Septime Webre, Dwight Rhoden, offered start-up repertoire. Moses Pendleton's highly popular Noir Blanc was a seminal event for the young troupe. It launched a tradition of commissioning new work. An open, exploratory style emerged as Mossbrucker and Malaty tapped the creative scene in Europe where classical ballet was breaking from its boundaries. The athletic and adventurous American dancers found themselves at a crossroads of dance history.

In 2000 the company began a co-venture with a presenting organization in Santa Fe and now perform under the name Aspen Santa Fe Ballet.

Aspen Santa Fe Ballet (ASFB) made its New York City debut at The Joyce Theater in 2003 and has notably performed at Jacob's Pillow Dance Festival and Wolf Trap National Park for the Performing Arts. In 2004 ASFB made its international debut in Canada and France and in 2013 ASFB made its debut in Moscow, Russia.

Aspen Santa Fe Ballet, like every dance company in the world, was forced to lay dormant in the year 2020 due to the coronavirus. Through careful consideration, the Artistic Directors chose to reinvent the company's business model and close the ballet troupe.

To further the organization's mission, the ASFB Fund for the Innovation in Dance was created to help preserve dance education and live performance in Aspen and Santa Fe.

Aspen Santa Fe Ballet now focuses on continuing almost 30 years of live performance with their presentation series, as well as nurturing their education programs, Aspen Santa Fe Ballet School and Aspen Santa Fe Ballet Folklórico.

== Education ==
The School at Aspen Santa Fe Ballet includes a rigorous professional level ballet preparatory program, a critically acclaimed Folklorico program, as well as other community focused programs such as the Parkinson's Dance Program founded in 2013. The School at Aspen Santa Fe Ballet serves the communities surrounding the towns of Aspen, Basalt, and Carbondale in Colorado and Santa Fe, and Eldorado in New Mexico.

Students in the youth programs perform in annual spring recitals, and alongside ASFB's professional dancers in The Nutcracker. To ensure that every child who wishes to dance can do so, Aspen Santa Fe Ballet awards over $30,000 in needs-based scholarships every year. The Folklorico Program is largely free to participants.

== Staff ==
Bebe Schweppe, Founder, grew up in Augusta, Georgia, and started dancing at the age of 7 at Georgia Dance Theatre under Frankie Levy. At the age of eleven she was invited by Robert Joffrey to study in New York on a full scholarship. She moved to Aspen in 1975 and founded Aspen Ballet School in 1990, and Aspen Ballet Company in 1996.

Jean-Philippe Malaty, Executive Director, grew up in the Basque region of France. After receiving his degree in dance, he accepted scholarships to study in some of Europe's most prestigious schools: MUDRA, Maurice Bejart's school in Brussels, and John Cranko's school in Stuttgart. At the invitation of David Howard, Jean-Philippe came to America to study at the David Howard Dance Center in New York City. Since then, Jean-Philippe has performed soloist roles with various companies throughout the country including Joffrey II, Los Angeles Classical Ballet, Ballet Hispanico of New York, and the Lyric Opera of Chicago. He has been recognized by the U.S. government as an artist of extraordinary abilities and was granted a permanent resident status.

Tom Mossbrucker, Artistic Director, started tap dancing at age four in his hometown of Tacoma, Washington. At age 14 he began his ballet studies with Jo Emery, and performed with her company, the Tacoma Performing Dance Company. His studies continued in New York at the School of American Ballet and the Joffrey Ballet School. He danced with Joffrey II before joining the Joffrey Ballet, where he performed principal roles in over 70 ballets, and toured throughout the world. His favorite roles include those performed in Billy the Kid, Rodeo, Romeo and Juliet, and The Nutcracker. He has appeared in television specials, and was featured in the Joffrey's Billboards, a full-length rock ballet set to music by Prince, which was released on videocassette. He danced with the Atlanta Ballet and Hubbard Street Dance Chicago.
