= Social dancing in the 20th century United States =

An example of jazz dance in a jook joint

Social dancing in the United States changed significantly over the course of the 20th century. Older European ballroom forms such as the waltz and polka gave way to new American styles, beginning with ragtime and jazz dance in the early decades, followed by swing in the 1930s and 1940s, rock and roll dances in the 1950s, individual dances such as the twist and disco styles in the 1960s and 1970s, and a growing presence of Latin American dances from mid-century onward.

== Background ==
At the start of the 20th century, established ballroom dances such as the waltz and polka began to lose ground to newer styles. Before this period, mainly the dances of the upper classes had been documented, as the dances of the lower classes were rarely considered worth recording. Industrialization and the growth of a new middle class brought social changes that also affected dance culture. The upper classes gradually became more accepting of dance and music that originated among the lower classes; ragtime is an early example of this shift. Jazz and swing, danced to jazz and big band music respectively, later followed as influential styles with distinct cultures of their own.

=== Role in society ===
Unlike competitive or performance dance, social dance is practiced primarily for enjoyment and social interaction. Writers on the subject have described it as a social center and an artistic outlet within its communities, and have suggested that a social dance survives for as long as it meets a contemporary social need.

=== Later status of early styles ===
Many social dances of the 18th and 19th centuries, such as the waltz and polka, had largely disappeared from mainstream American dance culture by the end of the 20th century. Some 20th-century styles, such as swing, continue to be danced by enthusiasts, though they are no longer widely popular.

== Start of the century ==
Ragtime and jazz dance were two defining social dances of the early 20th century. Both featured syncopated rhythms and steps that broke sharply with the formal ballroom dancing of earlier centuries.

=== Ragtime dance ===
Ragtime music was at the height of its popularity from about 1895 to 1918, and dance steps soon developed to accompany it. Scott Joplin's "Maple Leaf Rag" was published in 1898, and for roughly two decades ragtime dominated new American music. The upper classes initially rejected ragtime as music fit only for the lower classes, but its lively sound eventually won broad acceptance, and ragtime dancing spread across all social classes. After 1917, ragtime declined in popularity as jazz captured public attention.

=== Jazz dance ===
Jazz dance evolved from the dances of enslaved Africans on plantations in the United States. It was practiced in African-American social settings such as house parties, honky tonks, and jook joints, and later appeared in night clubs such as the Cotton Club and in stage musicals including Shuffle Along and Runnin' Wild. Typical jazz attire included hats, feather boas, pleated trousers, skirts, shorts, and dresses. The dance style is characterized by a lowered center of gravity, a forward-inclined torso, and movement driven largely by syncopated foot actions involving the whole body. Dancers sometimes vocalize during the dance, for example by calling out moves. Hubbard describes jazz dancing as requiring a "jazz state of mind": a way of moving that is at once energized and relaxed.

== Mid-20th century ==
Swing dance drew on the ragtime and jazz dances that preceded it, and researchers have noted similarities between certain swing moves and later rock and roll dance moves.

=== Swing dance ===
Swing dance became popular in the late 1920s and remained popular into the 1940s and 1950s. It faded with the rise of rock and roll and re-emerged in the 1990s. Swing was danced to big band music. A swing "scene" refers to a setting where the music, dancing, and related social interaction take place; the swing scene began on the cultural fringe and gradually merged with mainstream popular culture, shifting its emphasis from distinctiveness toward broader social participation. Swing was also distinctive among 20th-century dances for its physical contact between partners, and swing dancers deliberately sought to revive partner dancing as a form of social interaction based on closeness.

=== Rock and roll ===
Rock and roll displaced jazz as the preferred dance music of teenagers, becoming increasingly popular in the 1950s and 1960s. Its dances shared many movements with earlier jazz dance; for example, the foot actions of the Sugar Foot of the 1920s resemble those of the Mashed Potato, popular in the 1960s.

=== Twist and disco ===
Beginning in the 1960s, partner-based rock and roll dances were increasingly replaced by dances performed individually, such as the twist.

During the same period, country dances gradually gained popularity, which they maintained in the following decades.

In the 1970s, dances such as the twist were in turn succeeded by disco dances, which allowed both individual and partner dancing. The hustle was one of the most popular dances of the disco era. This period also saw the rise of dances that inherited many figures from earlier swing and rock and roll dances, adapted to more relaxed swing and club music.

=== Swing revival ===
Swing dancing, which by the late 1980s survived mainly in small local dance communities, regained popularity in the late 1990s during the swing revival. By that time the public was widely familiar with Latin American dances, which led to mutual influence between the two: elements of Latin dances were adapted into swing dancing and vice versa. For example, Casino Rueda, a circle dance based on salsa, influenced the creation of Swing Rueda, a circle dance based on the Lindy Hop.

== Latin American dance ==
Beginning in the mid-20th century, Latin American social dances became an increasingly visible part of American dance culture. Many of these forms originated in the Caribbean, where Spanish colonial ballroom traditions mixed with Indigenous Taíno dances and the music and movement of enslaved Africans to create hybrid genres.

The early 20th century saw a rise in the popularity of tango. The original Argentine tango was widely perceived by the American public as vulgar, and a modified North American version developed, which became one of the international standard forms of the dance alongside the Argentine original.

Cuban and Puerto Rican migrants brought styles such as the mambo, cha-cha-chá, and later salsa to U.S. cities including New York, Miami, and Los Angeles, where they became popular in both Latino and mainstream communities.

The mambo craze of the 1950s, led by bandleaders such as Pérez Prado, was followed by the cha-cha-chá, introduced by Cuban violinist Enrique Jorrín. Both dances were widely featured in nightclubs, on television, and in touring shows, helping to integrate Latin rhythms into American popular culture.

By the late 1960s and 1970s, these influences converged into salsa, a hybrid of Cuban, Puerto Rican, and North American elements. Salsa became central to urban Latino nightlife and later spread worldwide through festivals and salsa congresses.

Other Latin American dances also gained strong followings in U.S. social settings. Merengue, originating in the Dominican Republic, became popular in both Caribbean communities and American dance studios due to its simple step pattern and upbeat rhythm. Cumbia, with roots in Colombia, spread widely through Mexican-American and Central American communities and became a staple at Latino social gatherings across the country.

These dances introduced new rhythms and partner techniques to American social dance culture and became important symbols of cultural identity, particularly for Latino communities, while also influencing the broader social dance scene in the United States.
