= Complexions Contemporary Ballet =

Ballet company in New York City, US

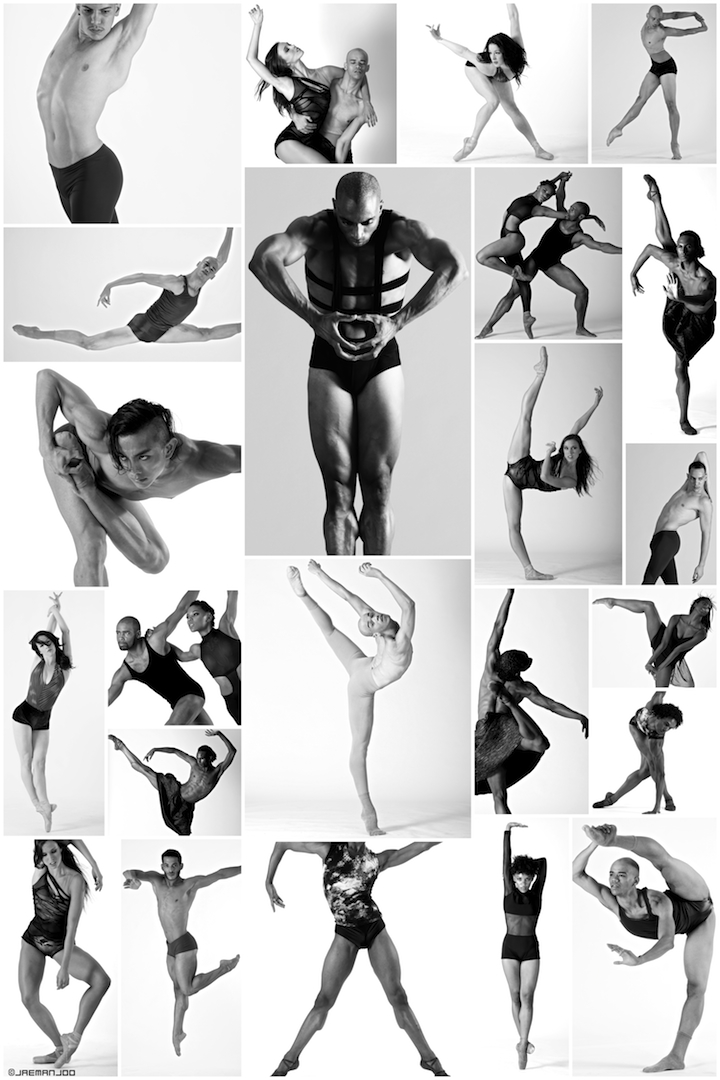
- Formation: 1994
- Type: contemporary ballet company
- Headquarters: New York, NY, USA
- Affiliations: Selby Artists Management
- Website: www.complexionsdance.org

Complexions Contemporary Ballet is a contemporary ballet company founded in 1994 by Dwight Rhoden and Desmond Richardson. The company, based in New York City, is a multicultural mix of classical and contemporary dancers.

== History ==
Complexions Contemporary Ballet's unique style draws on inspiration from the visual arts, theatre, street-dance and pop culture. Dwight Rhoden has created over 90 ballets for Complexions. Both Rhoden and Desmond Richardson were dancers with the Alvin Ailey American Dance Theater.

Complexions has appeared at major European dance festivals including Italy's Festival of Dance for four consecutive years, the Isle De Dance Festival in Paris, the Maison De La Dance Festival in Lyon, the Holland Dance Festival, Steps International Dance Festival in Switzerland, Łódź Biennale, Warsaw Ballet Festival, Kraków Spring Ballet Festival, the Dance Festival of Canary Islands/Spain, and Le Festival des Arts de St-Sauveur/Canada, and in Korea, Spain, and Australia.

== Programs ==
"From Bach to Bowie" is a two-part dance program set to the music of Johann Sebastian Bach and David Bowie. According to Rhoden, "this program is very much in line with Complexions, as it is a celebration of differences in many ways. The cast, the material and the choreography that we do is celebrating the beauty of things that are very different and putting them together... It’s all about the contrast. Bach is eternally danceable. It has a spirit. Dancers really respond to it. There’s such a dynamic, with so many different tones. I thought it was a nice partnership between that and Bowie.”

== Awards and recognition ==
Complexions has received numerous awards including the New York Times “Critics Choice” Award. It has appeared throughout the US, including the Joyce Theater/NY, Lincoln Center/NY, the Brooklyn Academy of Music/NY, the Mahalia Jackson Performance Arts Center in New Orleans, the Paramount Theatre in Seattle, the Music Center in Los Angeles, and the Winspear Opera House/Dallas.

== Reviews ==
- Hayley Mayne (September 22, 2010). "Dance Review: Complexions Contemporary Ballet". australian stage.
- Felicity Molloy (Dec 6, 2007). "Dance Review: Complexions Contemporary Ballet". The New Zealand Arts Review.
- Mark Lorando (December 1, 2007). "Dance Review: Complexions dance troupe: Absolutely dazzling". NOLA Arts.
- Jessica Cui (August 11, 2010). "Dance Review: Complexions Contemporary Ballet is a treat". The Huffington Post.
