= Robert Battle =

Choreographer, ballet company director

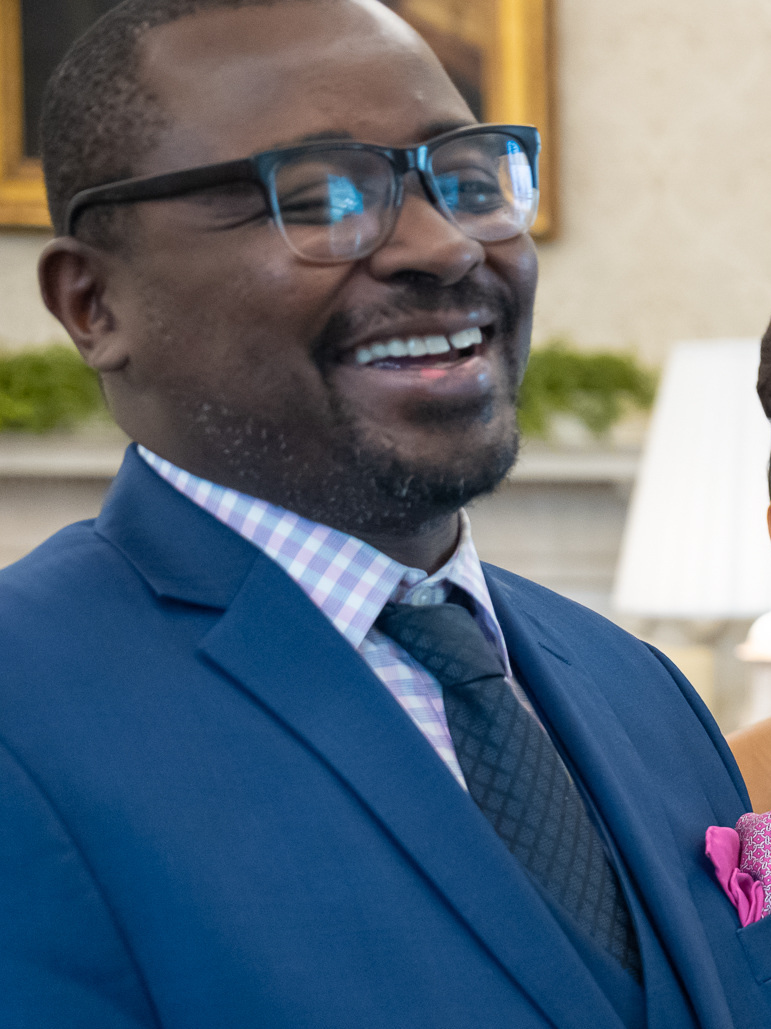
- Battle in February 2023
- Born: August 28, 1972 (age 54); Jacksonville, Florida, U.S.
- Education: Juilliard School (1994)
- Occupations: dancer, choreographer, artistic director
- Years active: 1994–2023

Robert Battle (born August 28, 1972) is a dancer, choreographer, and the former Artistic Director of Alvin Ailey American Dance Theater.

== Early life and education ==
Robert Battle was born on August 28, 1972 in Jacksonville, Florida. Originally from the Liberty City community of Miami, Florida, Battle was raised by his great uncle Willie Horne and his cousin Dessie Horne in economically poor living conditions. He studied at the New World School of the Arts before graduating from the Juilliard School, where he received a Bachelor of Fine Arts degree in 1994. At Juilliard, former Paul Taylor dancer Carolyn Adams became his mentor.

== Career ==
Upon graduation from Juilliard, he joined the Parsons Dance Company. In 1998, he began choreographing for the group. He founded his own Battleworks Dance Company in 2001. The Battleworks Dace Company debuted at the Global Assembly of the World Dance Alliance as the American Representative, and went on to perform at the American Dance Festival and Jacob's Pillow Dance. He began working with the Alvin Ailey American Dance Theater in 1999, when he was commissioned to create a dance for the Ailey II troupe.

Battle was named one of the Masters of African American Choreography by the Kennedy Center for the Performing Arts in 2005.

In 2015 Battle was named a Ford Foundation Art of Change Fellow.

=== Alvin Ailey ===
He began the directorship on July 1, 2011, and is its third director since the company's 1958 inception. When receiving the position Battle says, "I hope to be worthy of this tremendous responsibility that I've been given, and to honor it in the only way Alvin Ailey would have accepted: by keeping it now, alive and moving forward". Although Battle was never formally part of the Ailey company prior to his appointment, making him the first artistic director with no direct connection to the company or to Ailey himself, he contributed a number of works to the company's repertoire, and had long been recognized as the anointed successor to Judith Jamison. As Jamison was in an interview she says, "that Battle's choreography has the ability to draw audiences into his work, and it reminds her of Alvin". He served several terms as artist-in-residence with Ailey.

In 2015, Battle created his first work for the Alvin Ailey American Dance Theater, Awakening. The same year saw the Alvin Ailey company premiere of his No Longer Silent. Of the piece, composed eight years prior for Juilliard, the New York Times wrote, “It’s arguably Mr. Battle’s strongest piece, and the most major one that he’s set on the Ailey troupe so far. Battle echoes the rhythmic complexity of the music in his ritualistic choreography that is reminiscent of the early works of Martha Graham and, in many moments, the theatricality of Paul Taylor, yet this dance retains its taut point of view to the end.”

In November 2023, Battle announced his retirement as Artistic Director, for health reasons.

=== Post-Ailey work ===
In November 2024, Battle accepted a position as a resident choreographer with the Paul Taylor Dance Company, with duties commencing in 2025.

== Works ==
- 1999- Takademe
- 2000- Promenade
- 2001- The Hunt
- 2003- Juba
- 2004- Feast
- 2004- Mass
- 2004- Strange Humors
- 2006- Final Sounds
- 2007- Bon Appétit!
- 2007- No Longer Silent, using the musical ballet, Ogelala
- 2007- Unfold
- 2008- Ella
- 2008- In/Side
- 2010- Three
- 2015- Awakening
- 2021- For Four
- 2025- Under the Rhythm
- 2026- A Starling
