= George Faison =

American dancer, choreographer, teacher, and theater producer

- Born: December 21, 1945 (age 80); Washington, D.C.
- Education: Howard University
- Occupations: Choreographer, producer, dancer
- Years active: 1967-present
- Known for: Don't Bother Me, I Can't Cope, The Wiz, 1600 Pennsylvania Avenue

George W. Faison (born December 21, 1945) is an American dancer, choreographer, teacher, and theater producer, and winner of a 1975 Tony, a Drama Desk Award, and a 1991 nominee for the Emmy Award for choreography. He was a featured dancer with the Alvin Ailey American Dance Theater, founder of the George Faison Universal Dance Experience, and co-founder/producing artistic director of the Faison Firehouse Theater.

== Early life ==
Faison was born December 21, 1945, in Washington, D.C., and attended Dunbar High School. As a student he performed with the American Light Opera Company in Show Boat and studied with the Jones-Haywood Capitol Ballet and Carolyn Tate of Howard University, where he matriculated in 1964.

While at Howard, Faison had initially planned to pursue dentistry. But while there, he worked with director Owen Dodson and saw a production of the Alvin Ailey Dance Company. This helped him make the decision to move to New York City and become a dancer. In New York, he took classes with James Truitte, Dudley Williams, Arthur Mitchell, June Taylor, Claude Thompson and Charles Moore at the School of American Ballet.

== Career ==
From 1967 to 1969, Faison danced with the Ailey, leaving in 1970. He danced in the original 1970 Broadway production of Purlie and founded the George Faison Universal Dance Experience with a budget of six hundred dollars in 1971. The group’s dancers included Faison (who also choreographed and served as Artistic Director), Renee Rose, Al Perryman, Gary DeLoatch and Debbie Allen.

During this period, he created several notable pieces, including "Suite Otis" in 1971 (set to the music of Otis Redding) for five couples, combining elements of ballet and contemporary styles.

Faison's Broadway debut as choreographer occurred in 1972 with Don't Bother Me, I Can't Cope, followed by other shows, including Via Galactica, Tilt and The Wiz, where he worked with Stephanie Mills and Geoffrey Holder. Later in his career he worked as a choreographer for entertainers like Ashford and Simpson, Earth, Wind and Fire, Patti LaBelle and Dionne Warwick.

He choreographed over two dozen musicals, including the Broadway show 1600 Pennsylvania Avenue (1967) with music by Leonard Bernstein; a Radio City Music Hall production of Porgy and Bess (1983); and Sing, Mahalia, Sing (1985) at the Shubert Theater in Philadelphia. He directed and choreographed the show The Apollo - Just Like Magic (1981) at the Warner Theater in Washington, D.C. (which re-created the golden age of the Apollo Theater) and choreographed the world premiere of Harry Partch's Revelation in the Courthouse Park (staged by Jiri Zizka) for the American Music Theater Festival in 1987. In 1989 he conceived and produced the television special, Cosby Salutes Ailiey in celebration of Alvin Ailey American Dance Theater's thirtieth anniversary. He won an Emmy Award for his choreography in the HBO special The Josephine Baker Story in 1991. In 1997, Faison directed and choreographed King, a musical performed at Bill Clinton’s inauguration.

== Faison Firehouse Theater ==
In 1997, Faison founded the American Performing Arts Collaborative (APAC), using the arts to interact with and inspire young people. Two years later, he purchased an abandoned firehouse on Hancock Place (one block south of 125th St) and renovated it over the next decade. The building, designed by Howard Constable in 1908, was originally home to the Hook and Ladder No. 40 Company. Currently the building features a 350-seat auditorium, a café, dance and rehearsal space, and a recording studio. The official inaugural performance at the Faison Firehouse in Fall 2007 featured guest speaker Maya Angelou, in addition to professional musical theater and dance performances (choreographed/directed by Faison) and a performance by APAC youth.
