= Judith Jamison =

American dancer and choreographer (1943–2024)

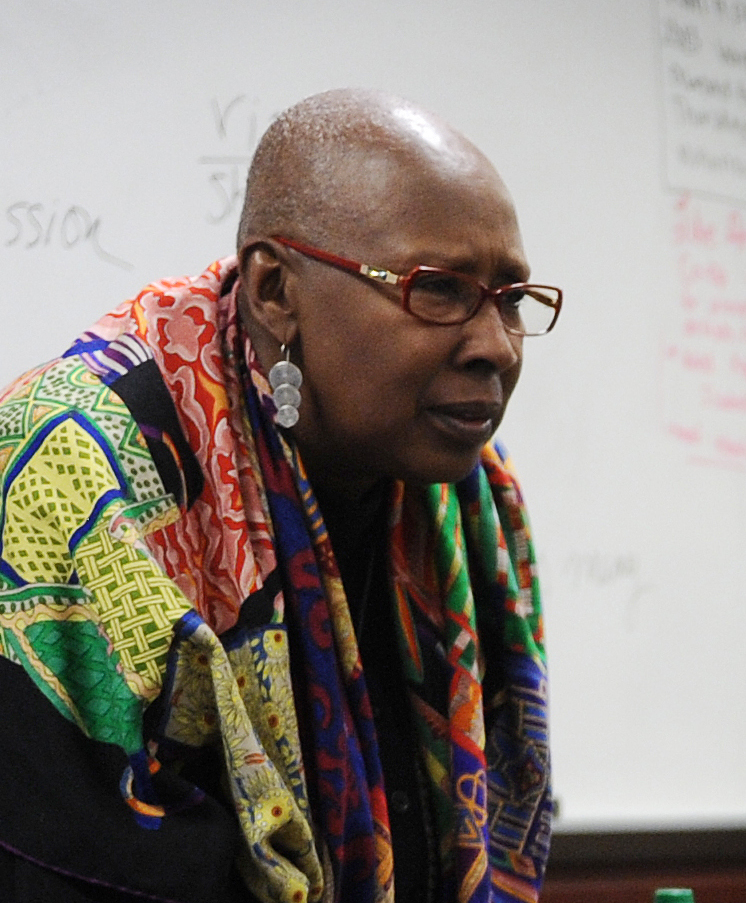
- Jamison in 2012
- Born: May 10, 1943; Philadelphia, Pennsylvania, U.S.
- Died: November 9, 2024 (aged 81); New York City, U.S.
- Education: Fisk University; University of the Arts
- Occupations: Dancer (1964–1988); Artistic director (1989–2011)
- Years active: 1964–2011
- Height: 5 ft 10 in (1.78 m)
- Spouse: Miguel Godreau (m. 1972; ann. 1974)
- Career
- Current group: Alvin Ailey Dance Theater
- Former groups: The Jamison Project; Harkness Ballet; American Ballet Theatre
- Dances: Cry, Revelations

Judith Ann Jamison (/ˈdʒæmɪˌsən/; May 10, 1943 – November 9, 2024) was an American dancer and choreographer. She danced with the Alvin Ailey American Dance Theater from 1965 to 1980 and was Ailey's muse. She later returned to be the company's artistic director from 1989 until 2011, and then its artistic director emerita. She received the Kennedy Center Honors in 1999, the National Medal of Arts in 2001, and the Handel Medallion, New York City's highest cultural honor, in 2010.

== Early training ==
Judith Jamison was born in 1943 to Tessie Brown Jamison and John Jamison Sr. and grew up in Philadelphia, Pennsylvania, with her parents and older brother. Her father taught her to play the piano and violin. She was exposed to the prominent art culture in Philadelphia very early. She began her dance training at the Judimar School of Dance at six. There she studied with Marion Cuyjet, who became one of Jamison's early mentors. Under Cuyjet's tutelage, Jamison studied classical ballet and modern dance. The Judimar studios were treated as a "holy place", and Cuyjet's classes always had a sense of performance and theatricality. By the age of eight, Jamison began dancing en pointe and started taking classes in tap, acrobatics, and Dunham technique (which was referred to as "primitive").

A few years later, Cuyjet began sending Jamison to other teachers to advance her dance education. She learned the Cecchetti method from Antony Tudor, founder of the Philadelphia Ballet Guild. She studied with Delores Brown Abelson, a graduate of Judimar who pursued a performance career in New York City before returning to Philadelphia to teach. Throughout high school, Jamison was also a member of numerous sports organizations, the Glee Club, and the Philadelphia String Ensemble. She studied Dalcroze Eurhythmics, a system that teaches rhythm through movement.

At the age of 17, Jamison graduated from Judimar; she began her collegiate studies at Fisk University. After three semesters there, she transferred to the Philadelphia Dance Academy (now the University of the Arts), where she studied dance with James Jamieson, Nadia Chilkovsky, and Yuri Gottschalk. In addition to her technique classes, she took courses in Labanotation, kinesiology, and other dance studies. During this time, she also learned the Horton technique from Joan Kerr, which required great strength, balance, and concentration.

In 1992, Jamison was inducted into Delta Sigma Theta sorority as an honorary member.

== Performance career ==
In 1964, after seeing Jamison in a master class, Agnes de Mille invited her to come to New York City to perform in a new work that she was choreographing for American Ballet Theatre, The Four Mary's. Jamison immediately accepted the offer and spent the next few months working with the company. When the performances ended and she found herself in New York without a job, Jamison attended an audition by Donald McKayle. She felt she performed poorly in the audition and claimed, "I felt as if I had two left feet." However, a few days later, a friend of McKayle's, Alvin Ailey, called Jamison to offer her a place in his company – Alvin Ailey Dance Theater.

Jamison premiered with Alvin Ailey Dance Theater at Chicago's Harper Theater Dance Festival in 1965 in Congo Tango Palace; in 1966, she toured Europe and Africa with the company. Jamison had always had a strong interest in African identity; therefore, traveling to Africa with the company and having the opportunity to observe the culture first-hand was an exciting and valuable experience for her. Unfortunately, soon afterward, financial complications forced Ailey to put his company on a temporary hiatus. During this time, Jamison danced with Harkness Ballet and assisted the artistic director. However, she immediately returned to Alvin Ailey Dance Theater when the company re-formed in 1967. Jamison spent the next thirteen years dancing with Alvin Ailey Dance Theater and was Ailey's muse. "A performer of great intelligence, warmth and wit," said The New York Times, Jamison learned over seventy ballets. "With Ailey's troupe, Jamison did many U.S. State Department tours of Europe, going behind the Iron Curtain as well as into Asia and Turkey. She danced quite a bit in Germany, which she said became her "second home". Throughout her performance career with the company, she danced in many of Ailey's most renowned works, including Blues Suite and Revelations.

On May 4, 1971, Jamison premiered the famous solo, Cry. Alvin Ailey choreographed this sixteen-minute dance as a birthday present for his mother, Lula Cooper, and later dedicated it to "all-black women everywhere, especially our mothers." The solo is intensely physical and emotionally draining to perform. It celebrates the journey of a woman coming out of a troubled and painful world and finding the strength to overcome and conquer. Jamison never ran the full piece from start to finish until the premiere. Cry became her signature piece. The piece and Jamison's performance received standing ovations and overwhelming critical acclaim at the premiere, rewarding Jamison with great fame and recognition throughout the dance world. Today, Cry remains a crowd favorite and is still featured in the company's repertoire.

Throughout her years with Alvin Ailey Dance Theater, Jamison continued to perform worldwide. Along with her work with Ailey's company, she also appeared as a guest artist with the Cullberg Ballet, Swedish Royal Ballet, San Francisco Ballet, and numerous other companies. Jamison danced alongside many renowned dancers, including the ballet legend Mikhail Baryshnikov, in a duet, Pas de Duke, choreographed by Alvin Ailey in 1976. Finally, in 1980, she left Ailey's company to perform in the Broadway musical, Sophisticated Ladies. It was Jamison's first stage experience outside of concert dance, and she admitted it was initially very challenging for her. It was a completely different performance atmosphere and required various new skills.

For pop culture audiences she is best remembered by a guest appearance on a 1985 episode entitled 'Jitterbug Break' of the 1980s television sitcom The Cosby Show playing Marie, a friend of Clair and Cliff Huxtable.

== The Jamison Project ==
In addition to performing, Jamison wanted to explore working with a group of dancers. She began teaching master classes at Jacob's Pillow in 1981 and soon began choreographing works. She later formed The Jamison Project with dancers who strongly desired to work and learn. The Project premiered on November 15, 1988, at the Joyce Theater in New York City, performing works such as Divining, Time Out, and Tease. Jamison later invited guest choreographers, including Garth Fagan, to set work for the company.

== Return to Alvin Ailey Dance Theater as artistic associate and artistic director ==
In 1988, Jamison returned to Alvin Ailey Dance Theater as an artistic associate. Upon Ailey's death, on December 1, 1989, she assumed the role of artistic director and dedicated the next 21 years of her life to the company's success. Alvin Ailey Dance Theater continued to thrive as Jamison continued to rehearse and restage classics from the company's repertory, as well as to commission distinguished choreographers to create new works for the dancers. Jamison also continued choreographing and creating dances such as Forgotten Time, Hymn, Love Stories, and Among Us for the company. In July 2011, Jamison transitioned into the role of artistic director emerita and appointed Robert Battle to the position of artistic director designate. Current Alvin Ailey Dance Theater artistic director Alicia Graf Mack credits Jamison as a strong mentor.

== Personal life and death ==
Jamison married Miguel Godreau, a dancer with the Alvin Ailey Dance Theater, in 1972. In 1974, their marriage was annulled.

Following a brief illness, Jamison died at Weill Cornell Medical Center in New York City on November 9, 2024. She was 81.

== Choreography by Jamison ==
Jamison represented women as strong and self-reliant in her choreography.

- Divining (1984)
- Forgotten Time (1989)
- Rift (1991)
- Hymn (a tribute to Alvin Ailey) (1993)
- Riverside (1995)
- Sweet Release (1996)
- Echo: Far From Home (1998)
- Double Exposure (2000)
- Here...Now (2001)
- Love Stories (in collaboration with Robert Battle and Rennie Harris) (2004)
- Reminiscin' (2005)
- Among Us (Private Spaces: Public Places) (2009)

== Writing ==
- Dancing Spirit, Jamison's autobiography, was published by Doubleday in 1993.

== Awards ==
- Candace Award, Arts, National Coalition of 100 Black Women (1990)
- Golden Plate Award of the American Academy of Achievement (1992)
- Youngest person ever to receive The Dance USA Award (1998)
- New York State Governor's Arts Award (1998)
- Kennedy Center Honors for her contribution to American culture through dance (1999)
- A Primetime Emmy Award and an American Choreography Award for her work on the PBS Documentary "A Hymn for Alvin Ailey" (1999)
- National Medal of Arts (2001)
- Honored by the National Theater of Ghana (2002)
- The Paul Robeson Award from the Actors' Equity Association (2004)
- Bessie Award for her commitment to development in dance and the arts (2007)
- Honorary degree of Brown University in Fine Arts (2008)
- The BET Honors – a tribute to the achievement of leading African Americans (2009)
- Listed in the TIME 100: The World's Most Influential People (2009)
- Congressional Black Caucus's Phoenix Award (2010)
- The Handel Medallion (2010)
- BET Black Girls Rock – Living Legend Award (2018)

== See also ==
- List of dancers
