= Revelations (Alvin Ailey) =

Modern dance piece

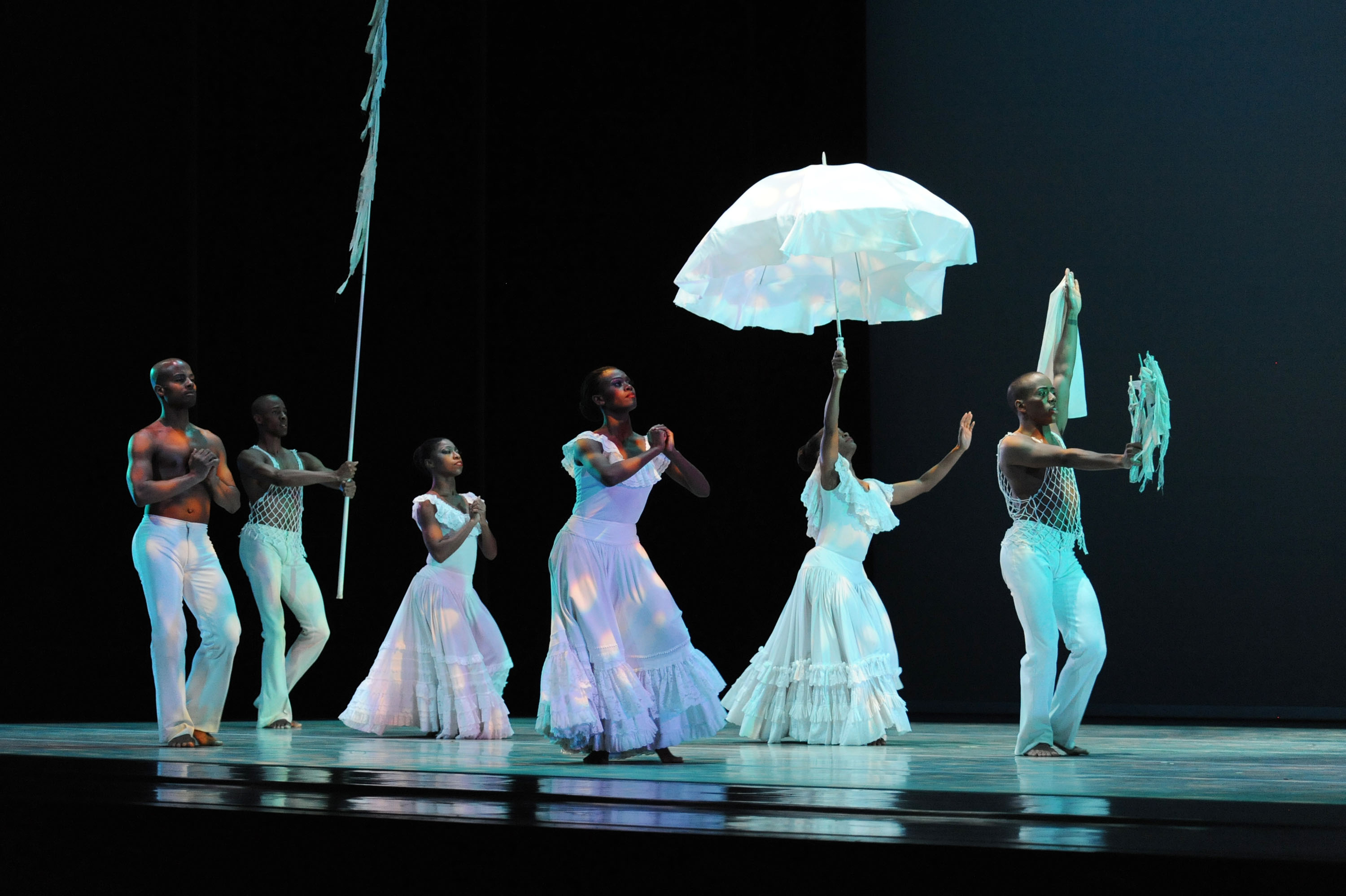
- Revelations "Take me to the Water" performed by Alvin Ailey Dance Theater in 2011
- Choreographer: Alvin Ailey
- Premiere: 31 January 1960; New York City
- Original ballet company: Alvin Ailey American Dance Theater
- Genre: Modern dance

Revelations is the best-known work of the modern dance choreographer Alvin Ailey. It is also the signature work of the Alvin Ailey American Dance Theater, which premiered an extended version of the work (lasting over an hour) in 1960, when Ailey was 29 years old. Set to spirituals, gospel, and blues music and influenced by the choreographer's own Christian upbringing, it presents a vision of the historical African American experience from a church-inspired perspective. The three sections of the final 36-minute revised version depict the suffering of slavery ("Pilgrim of Sorrow"), baptismal joy ("Take me to the Water"), and a choral church celebration ("Move, Members, Move").

While drawing on the modern-dance techniques of Lester Horton, who had been Ailey's mentor, Martha Graham and Doris Humphrey, the dancing is also influenced by the movement studies of Asadata Dafora, Katherine Dunham and Pearl Primus.

Revelations has been presented at the White House on many occasions, including the presidential inaugurations of Jimmy Carter and Bill Clinton, and it also formed part of the Opening Ceremonies for the 1968 Olympics in Mexico City.

== Background ==
Born in 1931 in Rogers, Texas, Alvin Ailey was raised by a young, single mother named Lula Elizabeth. Due to the Great Depression and racial segregation, there was a large struggle for finding work and the two of them were forced to move often. As a result, Ailey spent the first twelve years of his life in various Texas small towns with only his mother to provide for the family. Ailey grew up in the stereotypical black, impoverished South, and he found refuge in the church. To describe his childhood, Ailey said, "I was miserable then and felt very alone". When Ailey was 11 years old, his mother chose to relocate to Los Angeles, California, with the intention of becoming employed. Alvin followed shortly after, though he stayed in Texas for a brief time to finish the school year.

Upon finding his place in California at the Thomas Jefferson High School, Ailey became involved with Glee Club, poetry, and language. At 18 years old, he was introduced by his good friend Carmen De Lavallade to dancer Lester Horton, who later became Ailey's dance mentor. When Ailey joined Horton's dance school at the age of 22, he was introduced to a wide range of dance styles. Ailey progressed greatly while studying at the school, and when Horton suddenly died in 1953, Ailey became the new artistic director of the company. Five years later at age 27, Ailey founded the Alvin Ailey American Dance Theater to present his vision of honoring the African-American culture through dance.

== The work ==
Revelations is the signature choreographic work of Alvin Ailey American Dance Theater. It was first produced by Alvin Ailey in New York City, New York on January 31, 1960, when Ailey was only 29 years old. The original sets and costumes were designed by Laurence Maldonado with a lighting design by Nicola Cernovich. Dancers in the premiere included Nancy Redi, Joan Derby, Minnie Marshall, Dorene Richardson, Merle Derby, Herman Howell, Jay Fletcher, Nat Horne, and Gene Hobgood.

Revelations illustrates the history, traditions, faith, and beliefs of the African American culture while telling the story of African-American faith and tenacity from slavery to freedom through a suite of dances set to spirituals, gospels, and blues music. Being raised by a fervent Christian mother, this piece was inspired by his days spent celebrating Christianity with song and prayer at the tiny Mount Olive Baptist Church, along with the works of Langston Hughes and James Baldwin, two African American authors and social activists.

Ailey intended for the dance to be the second part of his larger, evening-length survey of African-American music which had been begun in 1958 with his work Blues Suite though this was never fully realized. At its premiere, the piece initially had 10 sections, a live vocal chorus, and was an over an hour in duration, and included 2 soloists. Sections were removed as the work evolved, and an extensive tour sponsored by the U.S. Department in 1962 forced Ailey to commit the music for Revelations to recording. The dance then solidified into the three-part format seen today with a duration of 36 minutes. The original score included parts for guitar, percussion and violin and voice. The piece was expanded to include parts for keyboards, drums and electric bass.

Ailey did not dance in the world premiere, but as early company personnel shifted, he performed some of its group sections as solos.

Revelations is divided into three sections: "Pilgrim of Sorrow", "Take Me to the Water" and "Move, Members, Move"

=== Section 1 - Pilgrim of Sorrow ===
The first section, “Pilgrim of Sorrow”, begins in total stillness. As the stage lights up, the earthy colours of the costumes and backdrop become apparent. These drab colors symbolise the earth, as Ailey's intentions were to portray people attempting to rise up from the ground. The motions of these dancers also add to the portrayal of rising. The choreography contains a lot of arms reaching, as people reach upward to rise. The contractions choreographed in the piece portray the strength that these people must exert to try to be free; however, they are unable to reach that freedom, shown by the dancers falling to their knees. Aside from falling to the knees, this section of dance has the most floor work and grounded movement, symbolising the low state of mind that the characters have. During the duet part of this section, the lyrics “fix me Jesus” are repeatedly sung, showing that these dancers are asking for help. The "pilgrim of sorrow" also represents a bird trying to be free but never is. This duet utilizes a large amount of partnering.

=== Section 2 - Take me to the Water ===
The next section of the dance, “Take me to the Water”, is partially set to the spiritual "Wade in the Water", which was commonly used among slaves to signal a planned riverbank escape. The dance conveys a ceremonial baptism, focusing on purity. A large group of dancers clad in white sweep onto the stage as baptismal agents—a tree branch to sweep the earth and a white cloth to cleanse the sky—lead a processional to the stream of purification. This can be seen with the white and pale blue costumes, ribbons on stage, and backdrops, as the color white symbolizes purity, heaven, and illumination. To the strains of "Wade in the Water," a devotional leader bearing a large umbrella baptizes a young couple at a river, represented by yards of billowing blue silk stretched across the stage. The lyrics, along with the rolling movements of the arms and silk add to the importance of water in this dance. The white umbrella is symbolic of water and baptism. This movement is grounded but not floor work, exemplifying the middle stage between grief and joy. There is much reaching in this portion of the piece as well, showing how these dancers still yearn and fight to achieve joy. A raucous ceremony is followed by the meditative solo "I Wanna Be Ready" which communicates a devout man's preparations for death. Created by Ailey in collaborations with its original dancer James Truitte, the solo builds on exercises derived from the Horton modern dance technique.

=== Section 3 - Move, Members, Move ===
The final section, entitled “Move, Members, Move” celebrates the liberating power of 20th-century gospel music. This is the most positive and uplifting section, as it celebrates the church and its people. As stated by Moore and DeFranz, “the men rise from their chairs to join in the dancing, skipping transitional states of everyday gesture to launch into a flowing, tightly syncopated phrase of bounding jazz dance”. This section includes the propulsive men's trio "Sinner Man" and the "Yellow" section, set in a southern Baptist rural church. Eighteen dancers in yellow costumes enact a church service with fans and stools. Earthy but bright tones in the costumes, such as yellow and white, symbolize the joyous nature of the piece. The hats and fans are used to enact church service, and the fast and upbeat music adds to the positivity. The movements in this section are mainly upright, and this part consists of more jumps than the other sections. Stretched across the stage with torsos proudly lifted, the dancers embody the joy of faith contained by complex stepping patterns performed in unison. It can easily be identified as the most active part, as the dancers finally reach a state of happiness. This section also has the most dancers, conveying a large celebration.

== Performance details ==
- Run time: 36 minutes
- Premiere
  - Company: New York, Kaufman Concert Hall, 92nd Street YM-YWHM, 1960
  - World: New York, Kaufman Concert Hall, 92nd Street YM-YWHM, 1960
- Costumes: Costumes for Rocka My Soul section redesigned by Barbara Forbes
- Décor and costumes: Original décor and costumes by Lawrence Maldonado; Revival décor and costumes by Ves Harper
- Lighting: Nicola Cernovitch
- Music: Various artists
- Musical Style: Traditional spirituals

=== Music ===
==== "PILGRIM OF SORROW" ====
I Been 'Buked - Music arranged by Hall Johnson*

Didn't My Lord Deliver Daniel - Music arranged by James Miller+

Fix Me, Jesus - Music arranged by Hall Johnson*

==== "TAKE ME TO THE WATER" ====
Processional/Honor, Honor - Music adapted and arranged by Howard A. Roberts

Wade in the Water - Music adapted and arranged by Howard A. Roberts

"Wade in the Water" sequence by Ella Jenkins / "A Man Went Down to the River" is an original composition by Ella Jenkins

I Wanna Be Ready - Music arranged by James Miller+

==== "MOVE, MEMBERS, MOVE" ====
Sinner Man - Music adapted and arranged by Howard A. Roberts

The Day is Past and Gone - Music arranged by Howard A. Roberts and Brother John Sellers

You May Run On - Music arranged by Howard A. Roberts and Brother John Sellers

Rocka My Soul in the Bosom of Abraham - Music adapted and arranged by Howard A. Roberts

* Used by arrangement with G. Schirmer, Inc., publisher and copyright owner.

+ Used by special arrangement with Galaxy Music Corporation, New York City.

== Original dancers ==
Loretta Abbott, Merle Derby, Joan Derby, Jay Fletcher, Thelma Hill, Gene Hobgood, Nathaniel Horne, Herman Howell, Minnie Marsall, Don Martin, Nancy Redi, Dorene Richardson, Juliet "Geri" Seignious, Ella Thompson, James Truitte and Myrna White.
