= Dwight Rhoden =

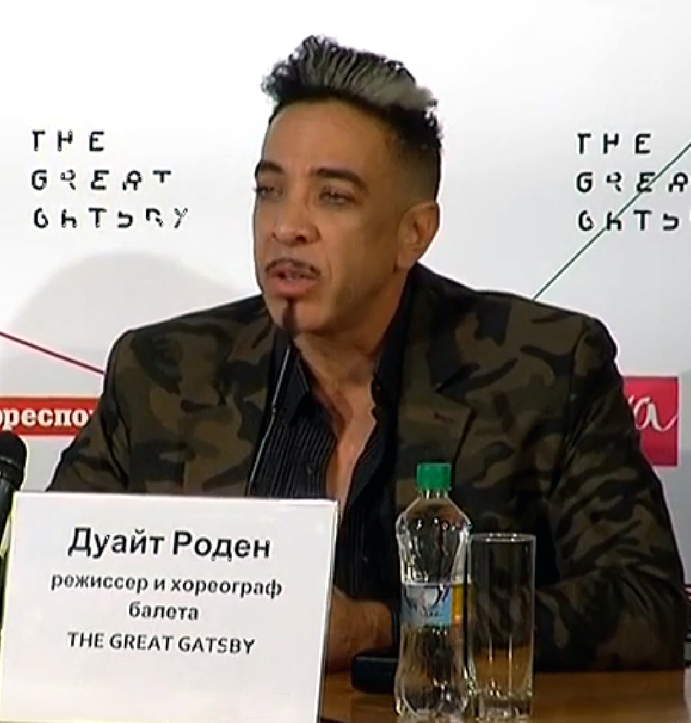
Dwight Rhoden

Dwight Rhoden is an American choreographer and the artistic director of Complexions Contemporary Ballet who began dancing at the age of 17 while studying acting. He has performed with the Dayton Contemporary Dance Company and Les Ballet Jazz de Montréal and was a principal dancer with the Alvin Ailey American Dance Theater. He has appeared in numerous television specials, documentaries and commercials throughout the United States, Canada and Europe and has been a featured performer on many PBS Great Performances specials.

== Complexions Contemporary Ballet ==
Rhoden has created over 80 ballets for Complexions, as well as numerous other companies, including Alvin Ailey American Dance Theater; The Arizona Ballet; The Aspen Santa Fe Ballet Company; The Dance Theater of Harlem; Dayton Contemporary Dance Company; the Joffrey Ballet; New York City Ballet/Diamond Project; North Carolina Dance Theater; The Pennsylvania Ballet; Philadanco; Minnesota Dance Theater; Phoenix Dance Company; Sacramento Ballet; Oakland Ballet; Pittsburgh Ballet Theater; The Washington Ballet; and Zenon Dance Company. He has worked with, coached, and created for some of the most diverse artists spanning the world of ballet and contemporary dance.

== Projects and awards ==
Rhoden has lectured and served as "Artist in Residence" at universities around the country. He has directed and choreographed for film, theater, and live performances including E! Entertainment's Tribute to Style and Cirque du Soleil and for artists including Prince, Lenny Kravitz, and Kelly Clarkson. Rhoden worked on the film One Last Dance, starring Patrick Swayze.

Rhoden is a 1998 New York Foundation for the Arts Award Recipient. In 2001, Rhoden was honored with the Choo San Goh Award for Choreography.
