= Ulysses Dove =

American choreographer

Ulysses Dove (January 17, 1947 in Columbia, South Carolina – June 11, 1996 in Manhattan) was a choreographer.

Dove began his dance training at Boggs Academy in Georgia. Dove gave up his premedical studies at Howard University to transfer to the University of Wisconsin and study dance with Xenia Chilistwa of the Kirov Ballet. He then transferred to Bennington College where he graduated with a Bachelor of Arts in dance in 1970. He then moved to New York City and was offered a scholarship to Merce Cunningham School as well as a position in the company. While in New York he performed for Mary Anthony, Pearl Lang, and Anna Sokolow. Alvin Ailey asked Dove to join his company in 1973 after seeing Dove perform in Sokolow's Rooms.

Dove soon became Alvin Ailey's principal dancer and became renowned for his ability to command the stage with a powerful and dramatic clarity. His choreographic debut came in 1979 with the piece "I see the moon…. and the moon sees me." He then left Alvin Ailey the following year and became the assistant director at the Groupe de Recherche Choreographique de l'Opéra de Paris from 1980 to 1983. Dove then became a freelance choreographer, working for companies such as the Dutch National Ballet, the Basel Ballet, American Ballet Theatre, New York City Ballet, Dayton Contemporary Dance Company (DCDC) and the London Festival Ballet.

Dove's choreography is famous for its speed, force and eroticism. Some of his more famous works are Night Shade (1982), Bad Blood (1984), Vespers (1986) originally set on DCDC, and Episodes (1987). Red Angels (1994) was created for and premiered at New York City Ballet. Twilight, which was performed on May 23, 1994, with Red Angels, was Dove's final creation.

Dove died on June 11, 1996, at the age of 49, at St. Vincent's Hospital in Manhattan of an AIDS-related illness.
