= Pantomimeteatret =

Open-air theatre in the Tivoli Gardens in Copenhagen, Denmark

Coordinates: 55.6745°N 12.5665°E

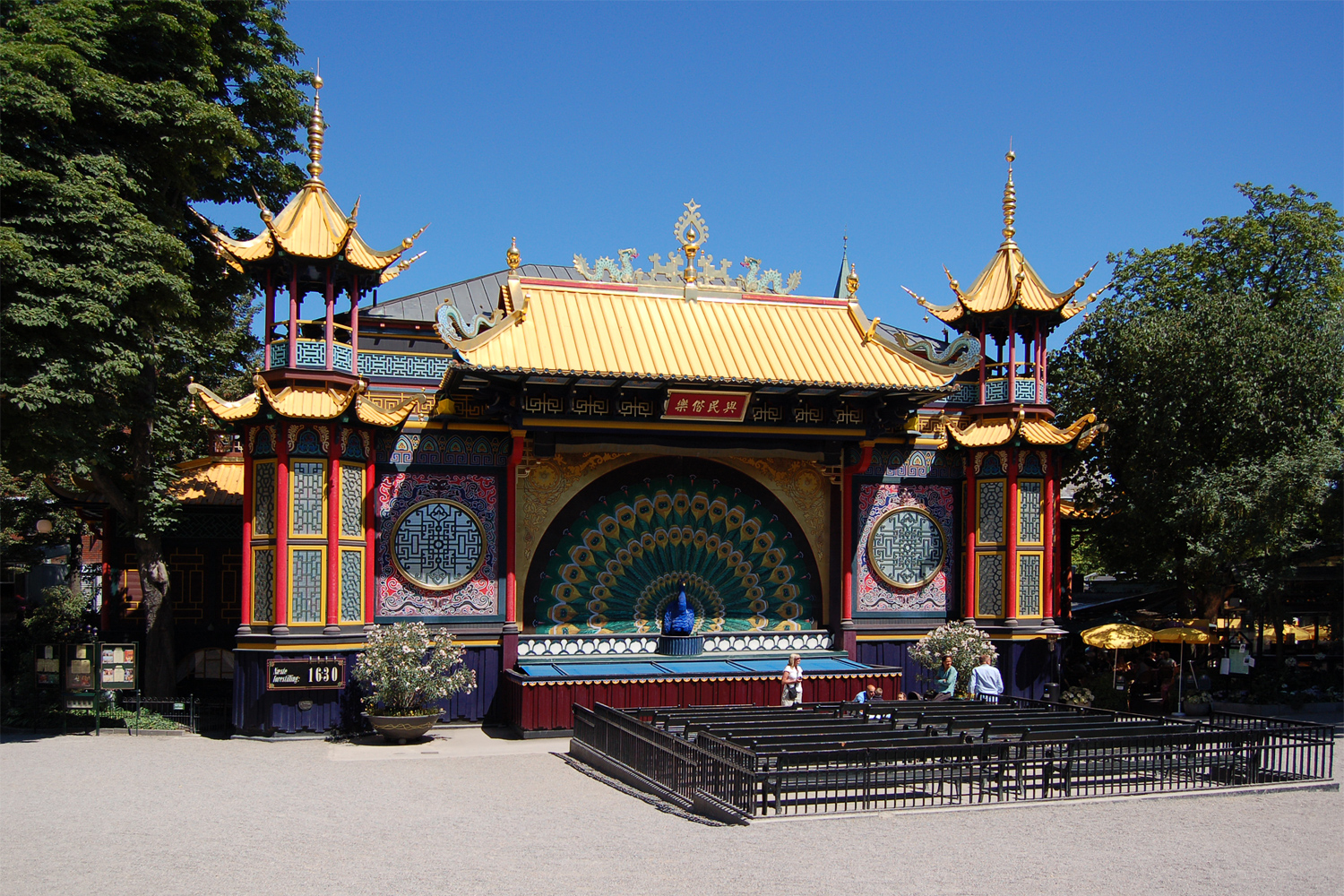
- The Pantomime Theatre with its Peacock Curtain
- Interactive map of Pantomimeteatret
- Address: Tivoli Gardens, Vesterbro; Copenhagen; Denmark
- Capacity: 120 (seated); 1,000 (standing)
- Type: Open air theatre, with resident company

Construction
- Opened: 1874
- Architect: Vilhelm Dahlerup

Website
- www.skuespilhus.dk/

The Pantomime Theatre (Danish: Pantomimeteateret) is an open-air theatre located in the Tivoli Gardens in Copenhagen, Denmark. As indicated by the name, it is primarily used for pantomime theatre in the classical Italian commedia dell'arte tradition which is performed daily. Besides this original function, the theatre leads a second life as a venue for ballet and modern dance.

== History ==
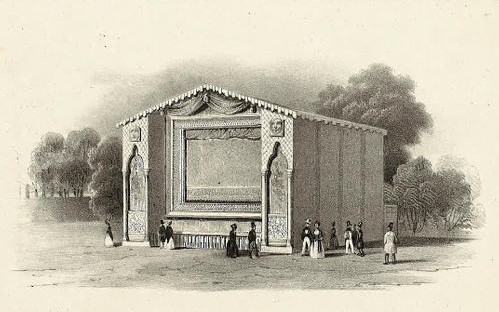
The first Pantomime Theatre

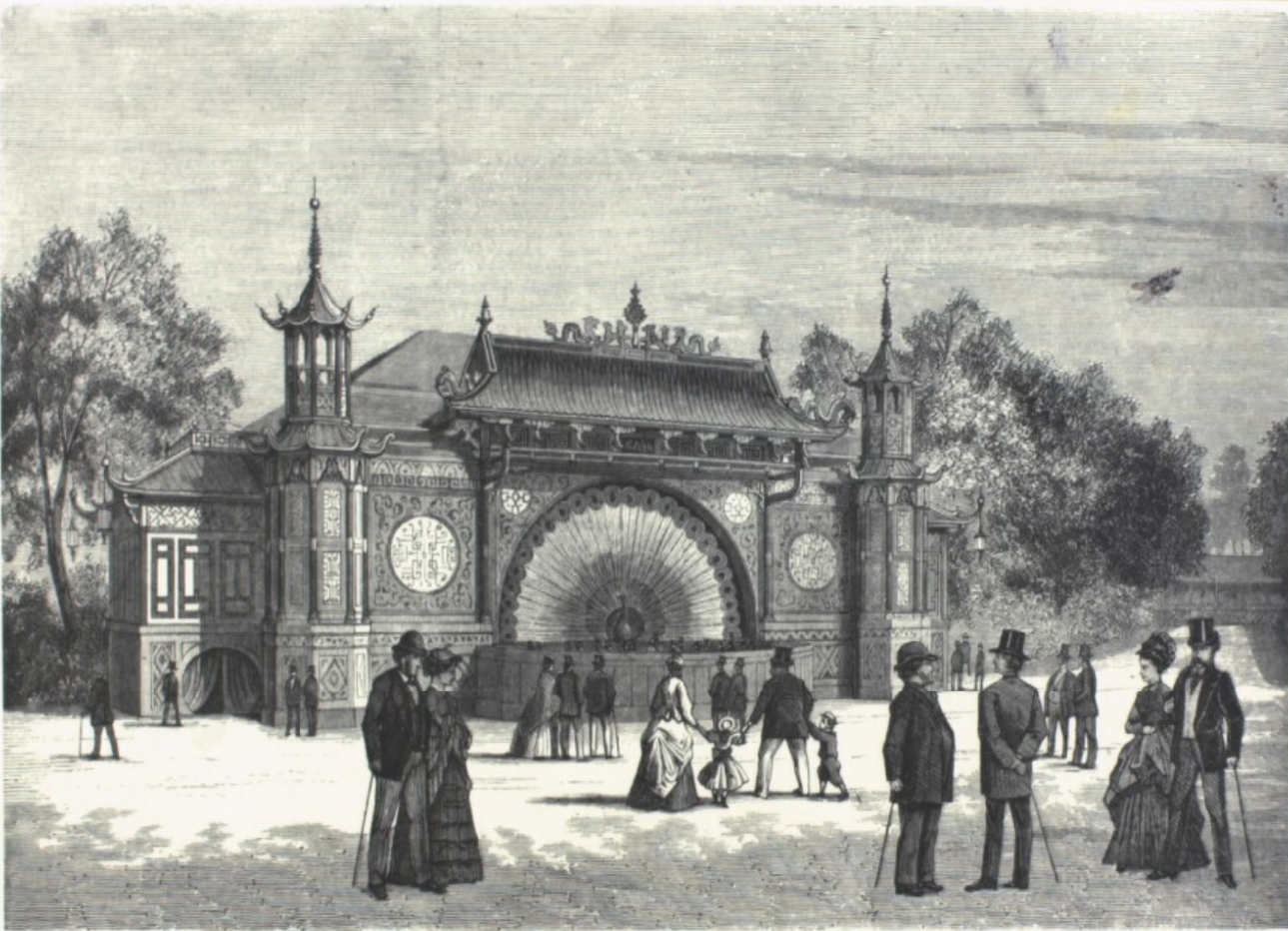
The new Pantomime Theatre

When the Tivoli Gardens first opened in 1874, a small theatre was already found at the site of the current building just inside the main entrance. It was made out of timber and painted canvas and after a series of rebuilding and major repairs, it was finally decided to replace it with a more up-to-date building in 1873. The architect Vilhelm Dahlerup, at that time working on the design of the Royal Danish Theatre was commissioned to make a proposal and the year after in 1874, the same year as the Royal Theatre, the present Peacock Theatre in Chinese style was inaugurated. Dahlerup had never been to China but he sought inspiration from pictures of buildings, borrowed from an engineer who had been stationed in the Far East. The technical side of the project was constructed by the theatre's director and Pierrot Niels Hendrik Volkersen and timber and assistance with the cordage was obtained from the Holmen Naval Base.

== Architecture ==
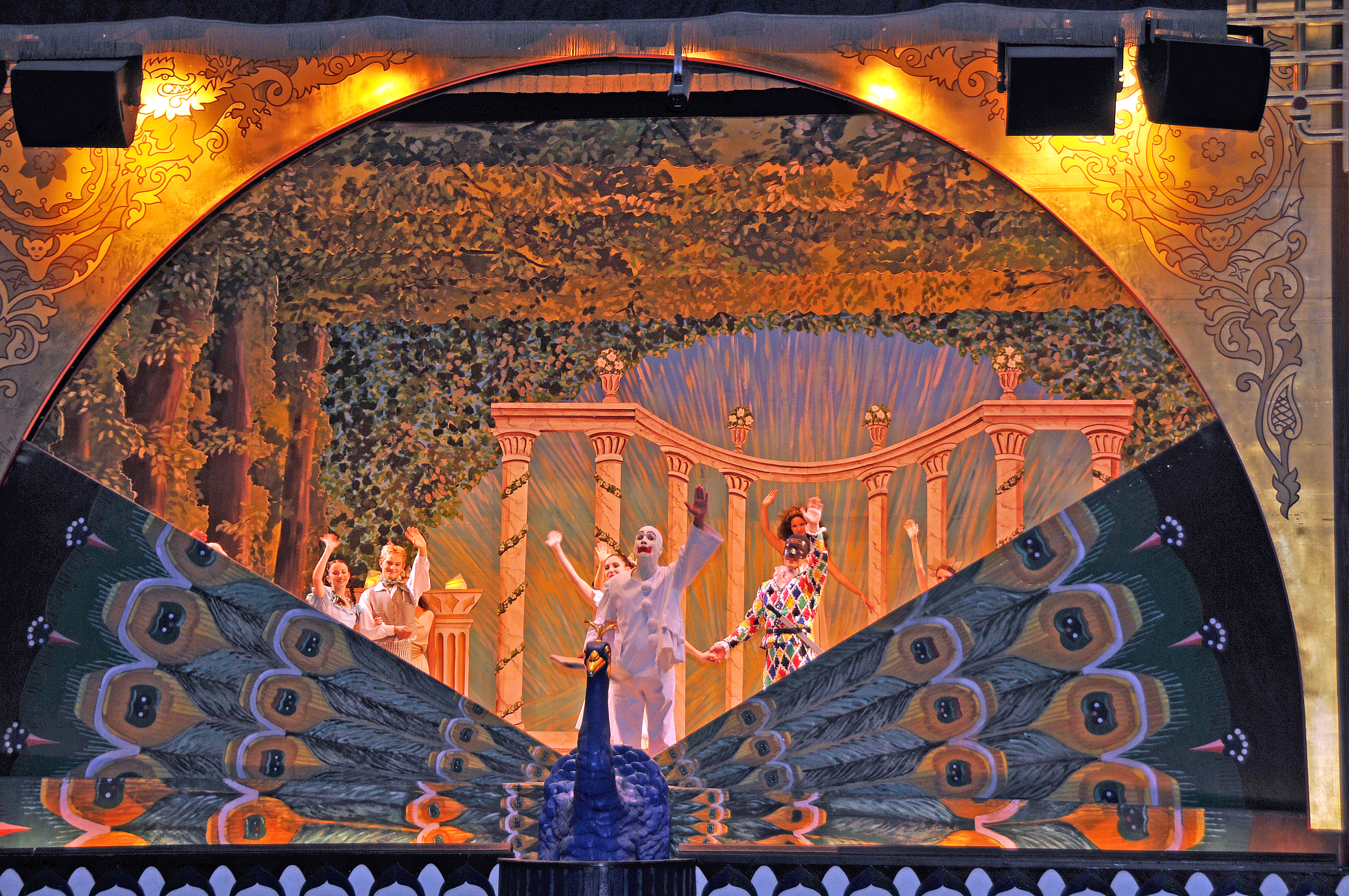
The stage with the Peacock Curtain

It is a toy-like Historicist theatre built in Chinese style and noted for its mechanical front curtain that takes five men to operate and unfold the peacock.

== Repertoire ==
The repertoire consists of a mixture of traditional pantomimes, ballet performances and contemporary and more experimental performances.

=== Pantomime ===
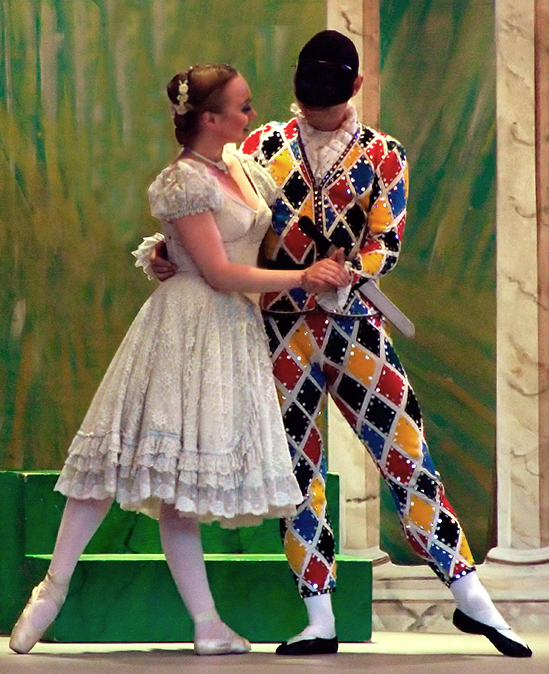
Harlekin and Columbine at The Pantomime Theatre

The pantomime tradition of the theatre is a mixture of many elements that are apparently quite unrelated. When the peacock folds down its wings, the stage is obviously set somewhere in old Copenhagen, at the home of stodgy Cassander who lives alone with his beautiful daughter, Columbine. It remains unclear what has happened to her mother.

Cassander is assisted by his servant, Pierrot, who has a white face. And Cassander's adversary with whom he is constantly struggling is Harlequin – described as a charming, masked scoundrel with little money to his name but who is deeply in love with Columbine and often well-connected to a sorcerer or fairy.

Like the characters, the music comes from many different sources. Musical sources include Strauss, Mozart and Gounod and Hans Christian Lumbye, Tivoli's in-house composer during the 1800s. Music has been selected to underpin the plot and movements of each pantomime.

=== Ballet ===
The programme also include ballet performances, including examples of the distinctive Danish Bournonville style and modern dance. HM Queen Margrethe created costumes and scenography several times, including for ballets based on Hans Christian Andersen's The Little Match Girl and The Swineherd in 2007 and 2009. Choreographers who have created works for the Pantomimeteatret include Dinna Bjørn, Louise Midjord, Paul James Rooney and Tim Rushton

=== Other performances ===
Since 2003 the programme has also involved more contemporary genre like jazz dance and hip hop pantomimes.

== Artists ==
Artists who have worked with the Pantomime Theatre include:

- Helgi Tomasson, ballet dancer
- Nola Rae, mime artist
- Ronald Smith Wilson, mime artist, dancer
- HM Margrethe II of Denmark, scenography, costumes
- Palle Jacobsen, ballet master

== See also ==
Tivoli Gardens

- Glass Hall (Tivoli Gardens)
