= Matti Silfer =

Finnish digital artist

Matti Mikael Silfer is a Finnish digital artist. He is known for the performance 'Moving Art', which he created early 2011 in collaboration with choreographer Paul James Rooney, celebrating great Nordic art and artists; including Grieg, H C Lumbye, Roslin and many more. Integrating dance film, a dance photography exhibition and live dancing all in one performance.
