= Palle Jacobsen =

Palle Jacobsen (3 December 1940 – 22 January 2009) was a Danish ballet dancer, choreographer and instructor with the Royal Danish Ballet and ballet master at the Pantomime Theatre in the Tivoli Gardens in Copenhagen.

== Biography ==
Jacobsen was trained at the Royal Danish Theatre's ballet school (1952–1957) and by Edite Frandsen (1957–1959). He danced with various European companies from 1960 to 1967, performing as a soloist in Basel, Graz and especially Düsseldorf. Ballet master Flemming Flindt brought him back to the Royal Danish Ballet in 1967, where he soon became one of the company's favourite soloists, often partnering ballerinas such as Kirsten Simone, Anna Lærkesen and Mette Hønningsen. He took on major roles in Swan Lake, The Sleeping Beauty, The Nutcracker and Giselle.

Following his retirement as a dancer, he became an instructor in 1972 until he was appointed ballet master at the Pantomime Theatre in Copenhagen's Tivoli Gardens (1983–1993). As an instructor, he worked with not only with the Royal Ballet and the Danish Dance Theatre but internationally with the American Ballet Theatre, the London Contemporary Dance School, the London Festival Ballet, the Dutch National Ballet, the Norwegian National Ballet, the San Francisco Ballet, the Cullberg Ballet in Stockholm, and the Pacific Northwest Ballet in Seattle.

As a choreographer, he produced Albinoni (Royal Danish Ballet, 1973), De Blå Øjne (Royal Danish Ballet, 1975), Mozart Suite (Bayerische Staatsoper, 1980), Hyrdinden og Skortensfejeren (Pantomime Theatre, 1981), Styx (Royal Danish Ballet, 1982), and various productions at the Pantomime Theatre including Pariserliv (1983), Venetiansk Karneval (1984), Anno 20 (1986), Romance (1987) and Carneval (1996).
