= Paul James Rooney =

Dancer

Paul James Rooney is an English dancer, choreographer. He has danced with various companies and choreographers, including names such as; Matthew Bourne, Tim Rushton, Will Tuckett, Danish Dance Theatre, various musicals & has choreographed many productions for Tivoli (Copenhagen)

Paul James Rooney is also known for competing on the first series of Den Vildeste Danser - the Danish version of Syco Entertainment's The Greatest Dancer.

== Dance career ==
Paul James has danced for many companies, including; New Adventures, English National Ballet, Danish Dance Theatre, Tivoli Ballet Theatre and Alvin Ailey Dance Theater in their Copenhagen performances of Memoria. Paul James Rooney was one of the ballet dancers representing the Royal Opera House in the closing ceremony of the Beijing 2008 Olympics dancing with Leona Lewis and Jimmy Page.

Paul has also performed in various musicals including the role of Mr. Mistoffelees in Cats, Older Billy in Billy Elliot the Musical in Malmo, Sweden. At Det Ny Teater, Copenhagen Paul James has performed in Kinky Boots , Anastasia, Sister Act, Fiddler on the Roof and Dance of the Vampires

== Music ==
Paul James Rooney released his debut single Shine in autumn 2020.

Singles
No.	Title	Writer(s)	Producer(s)	Length
1.	"Shine"	Stephen Sims	Paul Coultrup	3:53
2.	"Save My Soul"	Stephen Sims & Paul James Rooney	Paul Coultrup	3:42
3.	"Brand New"	Ashley Gordon	Paul Coultrup	3:17
4.	"While They All Sleep"	Ashley Gordon & Tyler Connaghan	Tyler Connaghan	3:17
