= Dayton Contemporary Dance Company =

General information
- Name: Dayton Contemporary Dance Company
- Year founded: 1968
- Founding artistic director: Jeraldyne Blunden
- Website: dcdc.org

Senior staff
- Executive director: Ro Nita Hawes-Saunders

Artistic staff
- Artistic director: Debbie Blunden-Diggs

Other
- Official school: Jeraldyne's School of Dance

Dayton Contemporary Dance Company, which was founded in 1968 by Dayton, Ohio native, Jeraldyne Blunden, is the oldest modern dance company in Ohio, and one of the largest companies of its kind between Chicago and New York City.

== History ==
The Dayton Contemporary Dance Company was founded in 1968 by Jeraldyne Blunden as a performance outlet for students at Jeraldyne's School of Dance. Blunden picked students from her school for the dance company, acquiring twelve female dancers by 1972. One of these original dancers was Blunden's daughter, Debbie Blunden-Diggs, who would later become artistic director of the company.

In 1973, the company performed Blunden's ballet, Flite, earning the honor of being the first African-American group to gain membership to the Northeast Regional Ballet Association Festival. The company soon produced its first large scale performance in 1976, also marking the first time the dancers were paid for a performance. They performed Black Snow, a collaboration with acclaimed composer Roy Meriwether at Dayton's Memorial Hall in front of a sold-out audience.

Blunden shaped the Dayton Contemporary Dance Company as a repertory company through her continuous invitations for renowned guest artists to create pieces for her dancers. Young, budding choreographers, including Ulysses Dove, contributed to the growing company's repertory.

DCDC's outstanding repertoire includes works by world class master choreographers such as Eleo Pomare, Alvin Ailey, Ulysses Dove, Merce Cunningham, Donald McKayle, Rennie Harris, and Talley Beatty. Today, DCDC continues to acquire new works by contemporary choreographers including Bebe Miller, Warren Spears, Dianne McIntyre, Shapiro and Smith, and Ronald K. Brown. To further expand its repertoire, DCDC commissioned works inviting Bill T. Jones, Garth Fagan, Dwight Rhoden and Doug Varone to participate in DCDC's What Dreams We have and How They Fly. This four-piece program premiered in 2003 to celebrate Dayton's native sons, the Wright Brothers’ first flight 100 years ago and will artistically explore what the invention of flight means to our contemporary world. In 2013–14, as part of DCDC's 45th Anniversary, 10 new works were commissioned for DCDC by choreographers Kiesha Lalama, Ronen Koresh, Ray Mercer, Donald Byrd, Alvin Rangel, Rodney A. Brown and more.

The company's apprenticeship dance corps, DCDC2, was established as the pre-professional wing of the rising touring company under the leadership of Kevin Ward. In 1990, Blunden fell ill and Kevin Ward became the new artistic director of the company. Blunden's daughter, Debbie Blunden-Diggs, became the new director of DCDC2. Since, former DCDC dancer Shonna Hickman-Matlock has become director of DCDC2.

Kevin Ward retired on July 1, 2007, and Debbie Blunden-Diggs became the company's new artistic director.

== National recognition ==
- 2018: Participant in DanceMotion USA's seventh season, touring Kazakhstan and Russia as cultural ambassadors, May 2018
- 2016: Dayton City Commissioners cited Dayton Contemporary Dance Company as a true Gem City gem as they declared Friday, Nov. 4, DCDC Day
- 2016: The 2016 Bessie for Outstanding Revival was presented to Rainbow ’Round My Shoulder by Donald McKayle, performed by Dayton Contemporary Dance Company, and produced by Paul Taylor American Modern Dance at the David H. Koch Theater, New York (The New York Dance and Performance Awards)
- 2012: The documentary Sparkle, highlighting the career of Sheri “Sparkle” Williams, a dancer with the company for the past 40 years, was selected to screen at Silverdocs, the largest and most prestigious documentary film festival in the country. It also appeared nationally on PBS as part of a larger broadcast show entitled LIFECASTERS.
- 2012: The Company first toured to China
- 2011: The Company first toured to Chile
- 2007: The company was featured in the PBS Dance in America: Dancing in the Light documentary.
- 2004: The company was selected as a question for the trivia game show, Jeopardy!, as a result of the success of The Flight Project.
- 2001: The company was prominently featured in the PBS Great Performances documentary, Free to Dance, produced by the American Dance Festival.
- 1997: The company was the first dance company selected for the Ford Foundation’s Working Capital Fund for Minority Cultural Institutions, a program designed to strengthen leading, mid-size, cultural organizations at a critical juncture in their development.
- 1988: The company was one of four dance companies chosen by the American Dance Festival to participate in ADF’s Black Tradition in American Modern Dance project, which involved the reconstruction of classic dance works by African-American choreographers.
- 1994: Jeraldyne Blunden received numerous awards and commendations including the prestigious John D. and Catherine T. MacArthur Foundation "Genius" Fellowship Award
- 1973: The company became the first African-American group to gain membership to the Northeast Regional Ballet Association Festival.

The company has toured internationally to other countries including Bermuda, Canada, Chile, France, Germany, Poland, Russia, and South Korea

== Projects and collaborations ==
=== DanceMotion USA (2018) ===
DCDC is one of three dance companies across the United States tapped to tour internationally through the seventh season of DanceMotion USA, a dynamic cultural diplomacy program run through the U.S. Department of State and Brooklyn Academy of Music.

=== China (2012) ===
The company performed in China to celebrate the grand opening of the University of Dayton's China Institute in Suzhou Industrial Park.

=== Chile (2011) ===
The company performed in Chile alongside Hubbard Street Dance Chicago, Cirque Eloize, and Chile's Jose Luis Vidal at the Las Condes Municipal Theatre.

=== In the Spirit of… (2009) ===
The company reprised its most popular dance offering ever, In the Spirit of..., held at the Dayton Masonic Temple. In the Spirit of... paid tribute to African-American liturgical worship, complete with a 100-voice choir assembled from local churches, instrumentalists, dancers from both the company and DCDC2, and nationally renowned jazz and blues saxophonist Kirk Whalum and equally renowned gospel and R&B singer Shirley Murdock.

=== Colôr- ógrăphy, n. the dances of Jacob Lawrence (2007) ===
The company commissioned new dance works inspired by the powerful paintings of Jacob Lawrence from choreographers Donald Byrd, Rennie Harris, Kevin Ward, and Reggie Wilson. This became the company's second largest touring project.

=== Lyric Fire (2006) ===
The company commissioned Dianne McIntyre to choreograph a piece celebrating the life and poetry of Paul Laurence Dunbar.

=== The Clearing in the Woods ===
The company united choreographer Ronald K. Brown with noted jazz pianist Mulgrew Miller in an innovative jazz/dance collaboration.

=== The Flight Project (2003) ===
In celebration of Dayton's native Wright Brothers’ 100th Anniversary of flight, the company invited Bill T. Jones, Bebe Miller, Jawole Willa Jo Zollar, Dwight Rhoden, and Doug Varone to create new works that artistically explore what the invention of flight means to our contemporary world. This five-piece program was the first and largest touring project the company has had in its history.

=== Children of the Passage (1999) ===
DCDC premiered Children of the Passage by Donald McKayle and Ronald K. Brown. This work was commissioned by the National Afro-American Museum and Cultural Center as part of a major project,

== Educational outreach ==
The company offers lecture demonstrations, workshops, school field trips, and residency programs adaptable for all ages. These educational offerings are available both in Dayton and while the company is on tour. The company aims to use dance as an experiential tool to facilitate learning in all subjects, supporting student success as determined by the state of Ohio Academic Content Standards.
