= Warren Spears =

American dancer

Warren Spears (May 2, 1954 - January 8, 2005) was an American dancer and choreographer. Born in Detroit, Michigan, he studied dance as a child, then moved to New York City in 1972 to study at the Juilliard School.

While in school, he came to the attention of Alvin Ailey, who invited him to join his dance troupe. Spears danced with Ailey's troupe from 1974 to 1977, when he left to concentrate on his own choreography.

Spears was a choreographer for the Dayton Contemporary Dance Company, including choreographing dances in honor of the centennial of the Wright brothers' flight at Kitty Hawk, North Carolina. The piece, evoking the courage of wartime flight, included a tribute to the Tuskegee Airmen.

Spears returned to New York, where he founded his own dance company, the Spears Collection. He also worked with the Alvin Ailey Repertory Ensemble and the Joyce Trisler Danscompany.

In the 1980s, he moved to Denmark, where he founded the New Danish Dance Theater in 1983. He was knighted by Queen Margrethe in 2003. Spears appeared in the film Dancer in the Dark for Lars von Trier. Spears died of multiple myeloma in Copenhagen, at the age of 50.
