= Queen Margrethe's and Prince Henrik's Foundation =

Queen Margrethe's and Prince Henrik's Foundation, also known as The Wedding Fund (Danish: Bryllupsfonden), is a Danish foundation that supports cultural, scientific, and social purposes. It was established in 1967 on the occasion of then Crown Princess Margrethe's marriage to Prince Henrik. The foundation's assets, from which it distributes funds, originate from the sale of commemorative coins and the Queen's artistic endeavors. Each year, approximately 2.5-3 million DKK are allocated to various causes.

Since 1995, the foundation has incorporated The Foundation for the Welfare of the Fatherland, which was established by a national collection at the liberation in 1945 and has financed the equestrian statue of Christian X at Sankt Annæ Plads in Copenhagen (Einar Utzon-Frank, 1941-54) as well as significantly contributed to the financing of the Sports High School in Sønderborg and the church in Klaksvig in the Faroe Islands.

Among the individuals who have served on the board are art historian Erik Fischer and former rector of University of Copenhagen Linda Nielsen.

In 1972, the foundation established the Amalienborg Prize, which supports the publication of significant Danish, non-fiction works that are translated into another language.

The foundation also manages the Cayx Scholarship, which is awarded to students and graduates with connections to France.

Over time, the foundation has supported a wide range of individuals, museums, charitable organizations, and other projects. These include Lin Utzon, Marianne Grøndahl, Erik Øckenholt, Ole A.

Hedegaard, The Cisterns, The Medieval Centre, Ordrupgaard, RemisenBrande, Ribe Art Museum, National Gallery of Denmark, Viking Ship Museum, Randers Egnsteater, Tønder Museum, Viking Castle Trelleborg, Trap Denmark, Children's Cancer Foundation, and Children's Rights.
