= Jeraldyne Blunden =

- Born: Jeraldyne Kilborn; December 10, 1940; Dayton, Ohio
- Died: November 22, 1999 (aged 58–59)

Jeraldyne Blunden (nee Kilborn) (December 10, 1940 – November 22, 1999) was the founder and artistic director of the Dayton Contemporary Dance Company, the oldest modern dance company in Ohio. In 1994, she received a "genius grant" from the MacArthur Foundation.

Blunden's company, Dayton Contemporary Dance Company, has grown to be one of the largest companies of its kind between Chicago and New York City, and holds the largest repertoire of classic works by African-American choreographers in the world.

== Early life and education ==
Jeraldyne Kilborn was born on December 10, 1940.

Blunden began her dance training at the age of six at the Linden Center, a recreation center in the African-American community of West Dayton, Ohio. In 1948, a number of African-American mothers approached the Schwarz School of Dance, later to become The Dayton Ballet School, about providing opportunities for their children to enroll in the school. However, segregation was common in Dayton during the 1940s and The Schwarz School of Dance had not admitted black children due to the possible ramifications to the school. Yet, despite social pressures, the founders of the school, Josephine and Hermene Schwarz, decided to break social boundaries and brought their school to African-American students through the Linden Center. Throughout Blunden's dance career, the Schwarz sisters served as her role models and mentors. The sisters helped her gain access to summer scholarships to the American Dance Festival in Connecticut. In her first year at the festival, she was the only Black student. At the festival she had classes in the style of Martha Graham, José Limón, George Balanchine, and James Truitte. These teachers later became her colleagues and friends as she followed the pioneering path of the Schwarz sisters, excelling as dancer and director.

Kilborn married Charles Blunden when she was 19.

Blunden attended the Connecticut College for Women (1959), Central Connecticut State University (1960), the Clark Center for the Performing Arts (1968–74), and the Alvin Ailey American Dance Theater (1971–75).

== Career ==
=== Linden Center ===
At age 19, Blunden became the director of dance classes at the Linden Center. Blunden made sure her students were able to gain a broad range of experiences, including summer opportunities and scholarships to attend schools such as the Alvin Ailey American Dance Center (later Ailey School), Dance Theatre of Harlem, and the American Dance Festival. Under her leadership, the student population soon outgrew the Linden Center's capacity and the Schwartz School of Dance had to move to the basement of St. Margaret's church on McCall and Home Avenues in Dayton.

=== Jeraldyne's School of Dance ===
In 1963, Blunden chartered her own dance school named Jeraldyne's School of Dance, beginning a new era of opportunity.

Blunden's School of Dance was founded on the premise that students should have a place to learn, train, and perform before moving on to bigger city stages. To provide high caliber dance training in Dayton, Blunden continued to train and perform across the country, bringing back knowledge and experience to the Midwest. Her experiences included performances and classes at American Dance Festival, Antioch Summer Theatre, Connecticut Dance Theatre Workshop, Dance Theatre of Harlem, and the Alvin Ailey American Dance Center.

=== Dayton Contemporary Dance Company ===
In 1968, Blunden founded her own dance company, Dayton Contemporary Dance Company, to create more opportunity for her students to perform. While Blunden saw the obstacle of adding a second dance company in a city as small as Dayton, she pursued her dream and began to handpick dancers from her dance school for the company. By 1972, the dance company had twelve female company members, including Blunden's daughter, Debbie Blunden-Diggs.

Blunden's new company provided the opportunity for her to cultivate her choreographic talent through the creation of new works for her company. The performance of her ballet Flite in 1973 earned her company the honor of being the first African-American group to gain membership to the Northeast Regional Ballet Association Festival.

The year 1976 marked the company's first large-scale performance and the first time the dancers were paid for a performance. They performed Black Snow, a collaboration with acclaimed composer Roy Meriwether at Memorial Hall in front of a sold-out audience.

Over the years, Blunden shaped the Dayton Contemporary Dance Company as a repertory company, inviting many guest artists to create pieces for her dancers. Blunden had the foresight to acquire works by young, budding choreographers such as Ulysses Dove.

This also led her to cultivate young talent such as Dwight Rhoden, who founded his own company and became one of the country's most well-known dance artists. Seeing promise in both Kevin Ward, one of her dancers, and Debbie Blunden-Diggs, Blunden primed them to be her successors and created a space for Kevin Ward as director of the company's apprenticeship dance corps, DCDC2, established as the pre-professional wing of her rising touring company. Blunden fell ill in 1990, naming Kevin Ward the Associate Artistic Director of the company and Debbie Blunden-Diggs the new Director of DCDC2.

=== Faculty ===
Blunden taught dance at Ohio State University, Wright State University, the University of Toledo, Wilberforce University, and the Miami University of Ohio.

== Recognition and awards ==
Blunden's work was recognized both in Dayton and nationally. She received honorary doctorate degrees from the University of Dayton and Wright State University, as well as prestigious awards including the MacArthur "Genius" Fellowship Award, the Dance/USA 2000 Honors Award, the Katherine Dunham Award, the Dance Magazine Award, The National Black Arts Festival's Lifetime Achievement Award, Dance Women Living Legend Honors, and the Regional Dance America Northeast Award.

Her numerous honours include:

- 1977 Top Ten Women of Dayton and the first female recipient of the Kuzaliwa Award for contributions to the black community.
- 1980 National Endowment for the Arts Individual Artist Fellowship
- 1991 Regional Dance America Northeast Award
- 1994 MacArthur Fellows Program (MacArthur "Genius" Fellowship Award)
- 1997 Dance Women Living Legend Honors
- 1998 Dance Magazine Award
- 1998 Katherine Dunham Award
- 1998 The National Black Arts Festival's Lifetime Achievement Award
- 2000 Dance USA Honors Award
- 2017 Lifetime Achievement Award, YWCA of Dayton

== Death and legacy ==
Blunden died on November 22, 1999, at age 58.

She left behind a legacy of an innovative dance company already receiving national and international recognition. Jennifer Dunning from the New York Times described Blunden's legacy as a beloved leader in the dance world, stating, "That no-nonsense approach to life was mixed with steely determination, a great personal warmth and humor and an unsentimental humanity that made her a much-loved figure on the national dance scene".

Her legacy has been carried on by her daughter Debbie Blunden-Diggs and granddaughters Alexis Diggs and Lyndsey Diggs. DCDC is now run by Debbie, her daughter, and DCDC2 is run by Shonna Hickman-Matlock.
