= Danish Dance Theatre =

Modern dance company in Denmark

Danish Dance Theatre is a prominent modern dance company founded in 1981 by the English-Norwegian choreographer Randi Patterson in collaboration with Anette Abildgaard, Ingrid Buchholtz, Mikala Barnekow, and soon thereafter, Warren Spears.

== History ==
Danish Dance Theatre was founded in 1981 as "New Danish Dance Theatre” by the English-Norwegian choreographer Randi Patterson in collaboration with Anette Abildgaard, Ingrid Buchholtz, Mikala Barnekow, and soon thereafter, Warren Spears. They were passionate choreographers who did a great job of putting modern dance on the cultural map. The English-born ballet dancer and choreographer Tim Rushton was the company's artistic director from 2001 to 2018. He started by working with a permanent ensemble of full-time dancers, and as from 2010 the company is subsidiary recipient under the Danish government’s Finance Act. The Swedish choreographer, dancer and filmmaker Pontus Lidberg was artistic director from 2018 to 2022. In April 2022, the Spanish dancer and choreographer Marina Mascarell was appointed as the company's new artistic director.

Since 2017, Danish Dance Company has had its permanent base at the Royal Opera House on Holmen, Copenhagen. The administrative, technical staff, and dancers all work within the facility. The company is an independent institution with its own finances and framework agreement with the Ministry of Culture. The collaboration with the Royal Danish Theatre offers the opportunity to add more modern dance performances to the national stage, e.g. at Takkelloftet, where Danish Dance Theatre several times a year presents work, as well as access to the big stage at The Royal Danish Playhouse. In addition to the company’s national and international touring activities, the company presents its yearly open-air performance Copenhagen Summer Dance that takes place at the harbor of Copenhagen.

== Tim Rushton ==
The company's former artistic director and chief choreographer Tim Rushton (MBE) was born in England and trained at the Royal Ballet Upper School, Covent Garden, London. He was employed as a ballet dancer at the Deutsche Oper am Rhein 1982-1986, Malmö Stadsteater 1985-1987, and the Royal Ballet 1987-1992, where he finished his dancing career to become a full time choreographer.

During his time as head of Danish Dance Theatre, Tim Rushton was nominated 10 times for the Reumert Award and received the Reumert of the Year in 1999 for "Busy Being Blue", in 2005 for "Kridt", in 2006 for "Requiem" and in 2008 for "Labyrinth". In 2010, Danish Dance Theatre received Årets Reumert for best dance performance with “Frost” choreographed by Tina Tarpgaard. In 2012, Tim Rushton received the Bikuben’s Honorary Award. Other prizes include the award of Teaterkatten in November 2006 as best producer. In 2007 Danish Arts Foundation’s Prize for special works of art, in 2006 for the performance: “Requiem”. In 2008 Danish Theater Association's honorary award. In 2009 Wilhelm Hansen Foundation’s Honorary Award. In 2011 Friends of the Ballet’s Honorary Award.

Tim Rushton is now choreographer and artistic director of Kompagni B, the Royal Danish Ballet's Youth Company.

== Pontus Lidberg ==
The Swedish choreographer, dancer and filmmaker Pontus Lidberg was Danish Dance Theatre’s artistic director from 2018 to 2022. He is educated at the Royal Swedish Ballet School and has a master's degree in Contemporary Performing Arts from the University of Gothenburg. Pontus Lidberg has created works for several leading companies, including New York City Ballet, Paris Opera Ballet, Royal Danish Ballet, Wiener Staatsballett and Martha Graham Dance Company. For Danish Dance Company he has created the following works: Sirene, Kentaur (winner of the Lumen Prize Nordic Award), Roaring Twenties, Ikaros, and Paysage Soudain La Nuit (restoration with dancers from A Costa Danza, Cuba and Dansk Danseteater) for Copenhagen Summer Dance. Pontus Lidberg was appointed artistic director of Ballet Nice Méditerranée, France in December 2024.

== Marina Mascarell ==
Marina Mascarell was appointed artistic director of Danish Dance Theater on April 1. 2023. She was born in Oliva, Spain and is a well-established choreographer. House choreographer at Korzo Theater in The Hague 2011-21, Associated Artist at Mercat de les Flors in Barcelona since 2019, and founder and artistic director of the MEI(s) Foundation.

Marina Mascarell has created works for e.g. Nederlands Dans Theater 1 and 2, GöteborgOperans Dansekompani, Biennale de la Danse de Lyon with Lyon Opera Ballet, Skånes Dansteater, Dance Forum Tapei and The Australian Ballet, Sydney. She also collaborates with other artists in visual arts, film, music and theatre. Throughout her career, she has been recognized and awarded with numerous awards, e.g. BNG Excellent Dance Award 2015. Her first performance for Danish Dance Theatre “Køter” premiered in 2024 and was a new staging of the original performance created for GöteborgOperans Danskompani in 2015. The performance is toured around Denmark and abroad. For Copenhagen Summer Dance 2024, Marina Mascarell created Bloody Moon that was also shown at Aarhus Summer Dabce 2024 as well as at the Museum of Modern Art in Copenhagen.
