= Margrethe II =

Queen of Denmark from 1972 to 2024

- Margrethe in 2022

Queen of Denmark
- Reign: 14 January 1972 – 14 January 2024
- Predecessor: Frederik IX
- Successor: Frederik X
- Born: 16 April 1940 (age 86); Amalienborg, Copenhagen, Denmark
- Spouse: Henri de Laborde de Monpezat (m. 1967; died 2018)
- Issue: Frederik X; Prince Joachim
Names
- Margrethe Alexandrine Þórhildur Ingrid
- House: Glücksburg
- Father: Frederik IX
- Mother: Ingrid of Sweden
- Religion: Evangelical Lutheran (Note: As monarch, Margrethe II was the de jure head of the Church of Denmark, per §4 of the Danish Constitution, although no formal authority is prescribed by law.)

Margrethe II (Danish: [mɑˈkʁeˀtə]; Margrethe Alexandrine Þórhildur Ingrid, born 16 April 1940) is a member of the Danish royal family who reigned as Queen of Denmark from 14 January 1972 until her abdication on 14 January 2024. Having reigned for exactly 52 years, she is the second-longest-reigning Danish monarch after Christian IV.

Margrethe was born into the House of Glücksburg, a cadet branch of the House of Oldenburg, during the reign of her paternal grandfather, King Christian X. She is the eldest child of King Frederik IX and Queen Ingrid (born Princess of Sweden). She became heir presumptive to her father in 1953 when a constitutional amendment allowed women to inherit the throne. In 1967 she married Henri de Laborde de Monpezat, with whom she had two sons, Frederik and Joachim. Margrethe succeeded her father upon his death in January 1972.

Margrethe has worked as a scenographer, costume designer, and illustrator of works by J. R. R. Tolkien. Support for the monarchy in Denmark, alongside her personal popularity, gradually rose throughout the course of her reign, attaining around eighty per cent by the time of her abdication. She was succeeded by her elder son, Frederik X.

== Early life and education ==
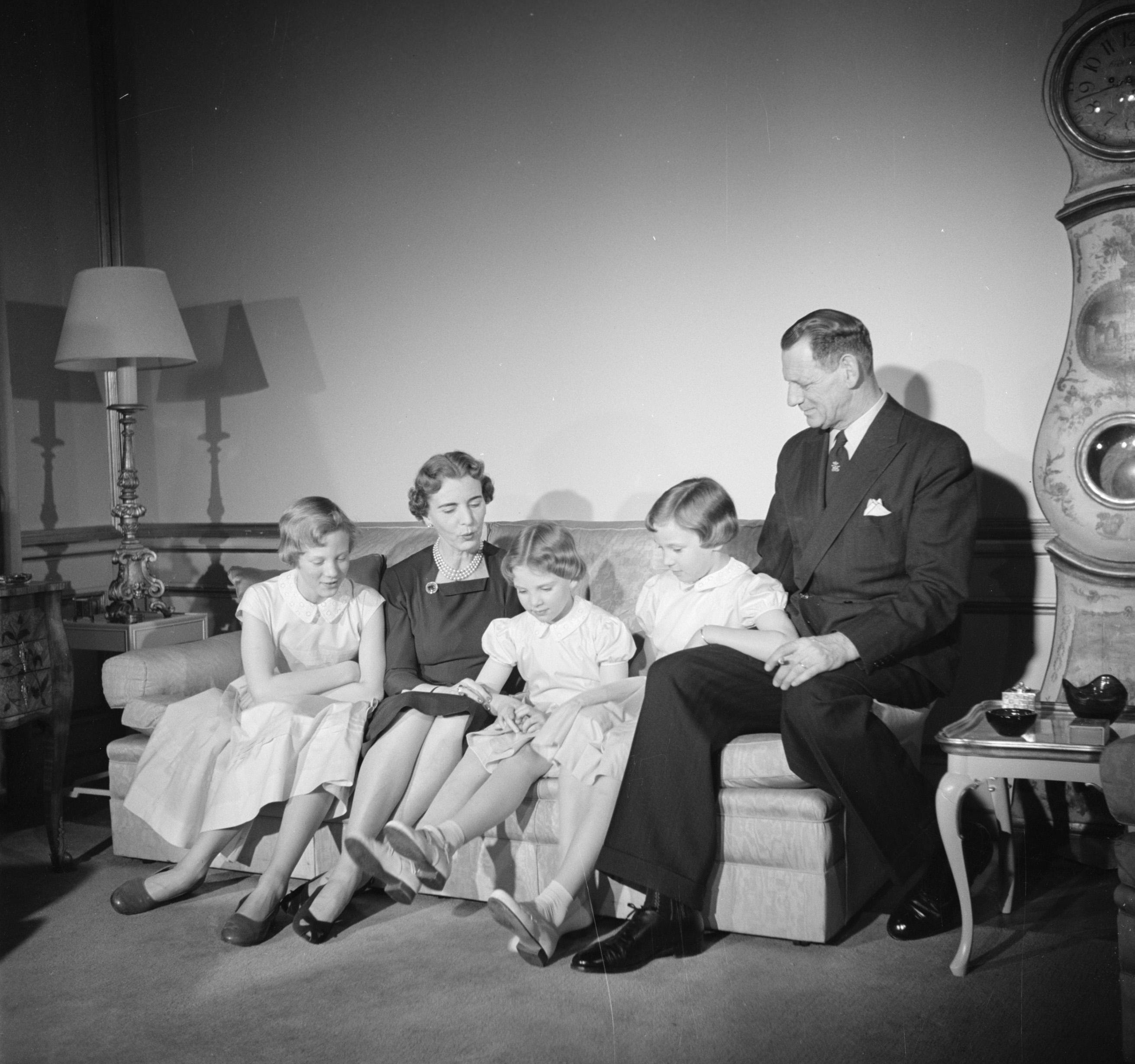
Margrethe (left) with her parents and sisters, 1954

Margrethe was born on 16 April 1940 at 10:10 CET at Frederik VIII's Palace, in her parents' residence at Amalienborg, the principal residence of the Danish royal family in the district of Frederiksstaden in central Copenhagen. She was the first child of Crown Prince Frederik (later King Frederik IX) and Crown Princess Ingrid (later Queen Ingrid). Her father was the elder son of the then-reigning King Christian X, while her mother was the only daughter of Crown Prince Gustaf Adolf of Sweden (later King Gustaf VI Adolf). Her birth took place just one week after the beginning of Nazi Germany's occupation of Denmark following the war invasion.

Margrethe was baptised on 14 May at the Holmen Church in Copenhagen. Her godparents were her grandfathers, King Christian X of Denmark and Crown Prince Gustaf Adolf of Sweden; her maternal great-grandfathers, King Gustaf V of Sweden and Prince Arthur, Duke of Connaught and Strathearn; her uncles Prince Knud of Denmark and Prince Gustaf Adolf, Duke of Västerbotten; as well as her first cousin twice removed, Prince Axel of Denmark. She was named Margrethe—the Danish variation of her late maternal grandmother Crown Princess Margareta of Sweden's name—Alexandrine after her paternal grandmother, Queen Alexandrine, and Ingrid after her mother. Since her paternal grandfather was also King of Iceland and she herself a Princess of Iceland at the time of her birth, she was given the Icelandic name Þórhildur ("Thor's battle" or "Thor's strength"). Like her maternal grandmother, Margrethe is known affectionately as "Daisy" to her family and close friends.

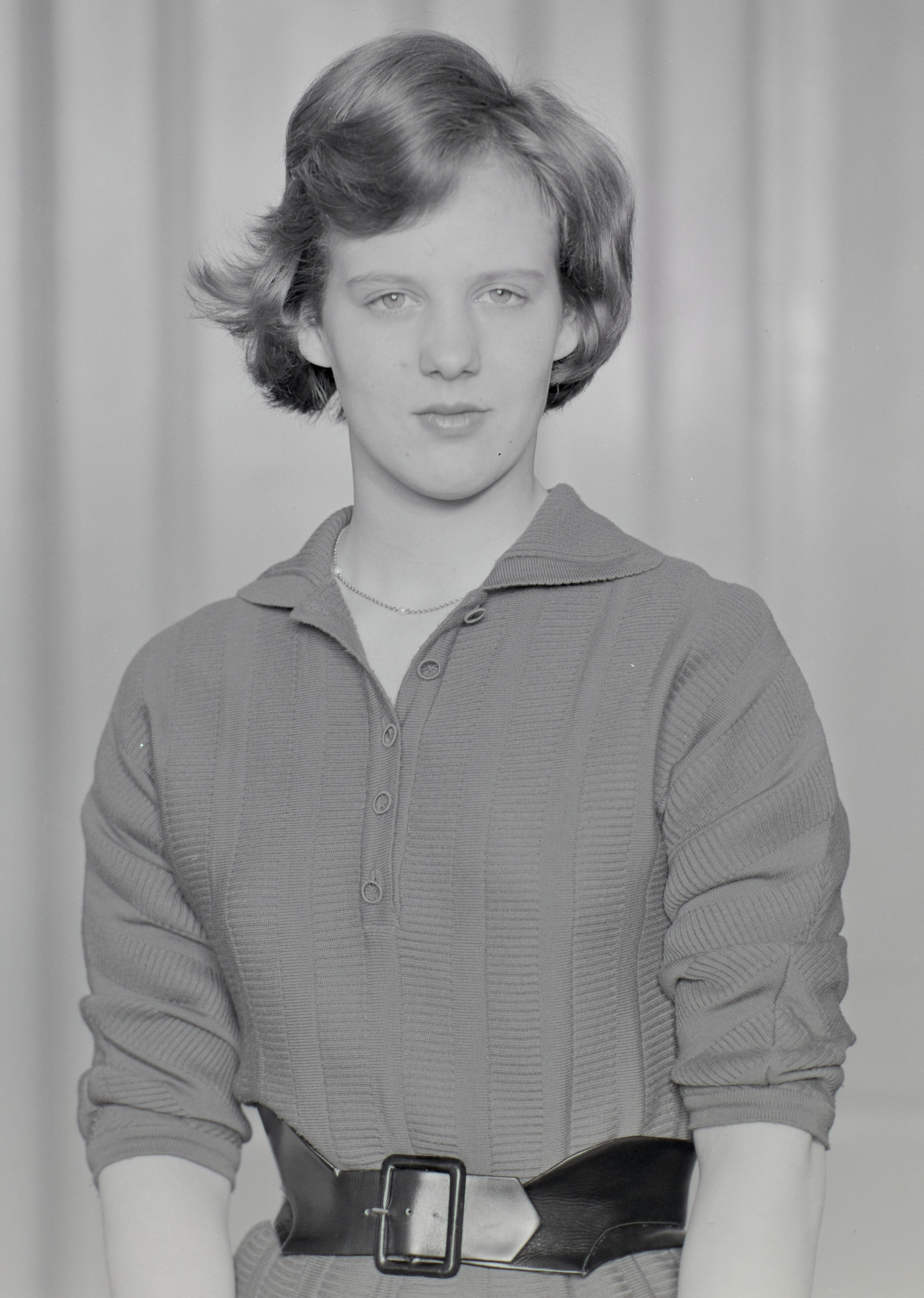
Princess Margrethe in 1960.

The birth of Margrethe's younger sisters Benedikte and Anne-Marie followed in 1944 and 1946, respectively. The princesses grew up in apartments at Frederik VIII's Palace at Amalienborg in Copenhagen and in Fredensborg Palace in North Zealand. Margrethe spent holidays with the royal family in her parents' residences at Gråsten Palace in Southern Jutland and Trend Hunting Lodge in Vesthimmerland in Northern Jutland. On 20 April 1947, following the death of Christian X, Margrethe's father acceded to the throne as Frederik IX.

=== Education ===
Margrethe received her early education at home at Amalienborg Palace alongside a group of 6 girls her age. From 1949, she was educated at the private school, N. Zahle's School, in Copenhagen, with Danish author Helle Stangerup among others. She spent a year at North Foreland Lodge, a boarding school for girls in Hampshire, England, in 1955, before sitting for her studentereksamen in 1959. Margrethe doesn't hold a full university degree but passed the examen philosophicum at University of Copenhagen in 1960 and subsequently undertook courses at several European universities: She studied prehistoric archaeology at Girton College, Cambridge, between 1960 and 1961 and political science at Aarhus University between 1961 and 1962, the Sorbonne in 1963 and the London School of Economics in 1965. She is a Fellow of the Society of Antiquaries of London.

Between 1958 and 1970, Margrethe performed voluntary service with the Women's Flying Corps, a branch of the Home Guard, where she eventually rose to the rank of lieutenant. In a 2015 interview, she noted that she had wished to serve conscription if it had been an opportunity. However, women were not allowed to volunteer for conscription in the Danish Armed Forces until 1968.

== Heir presumptive ==
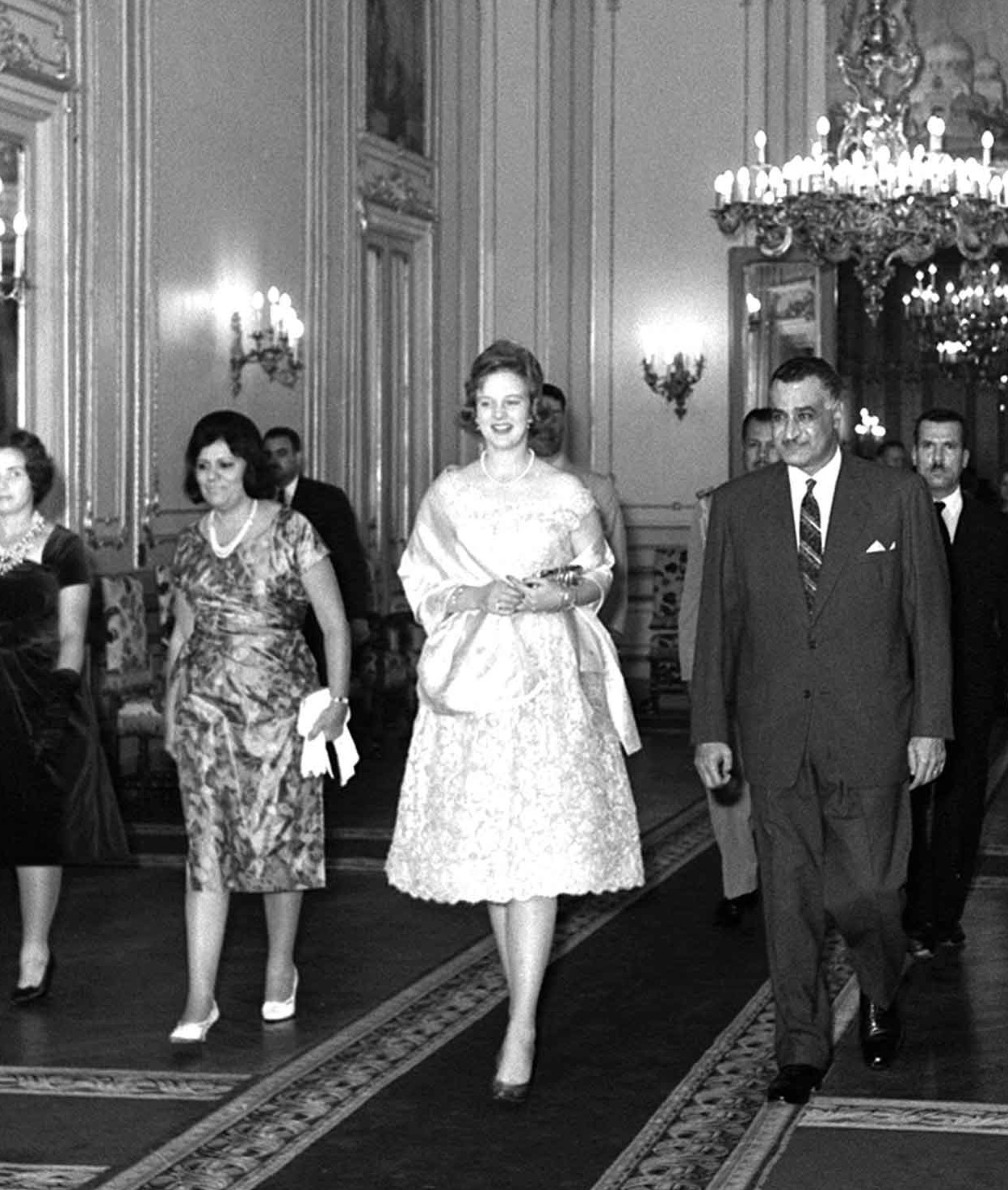
Margrethe received by Egyptian president Gamal Abdel Nasser and First Lady Tahia Abdel Nasser at the Abdeen Palace, Cairo, in November 1962

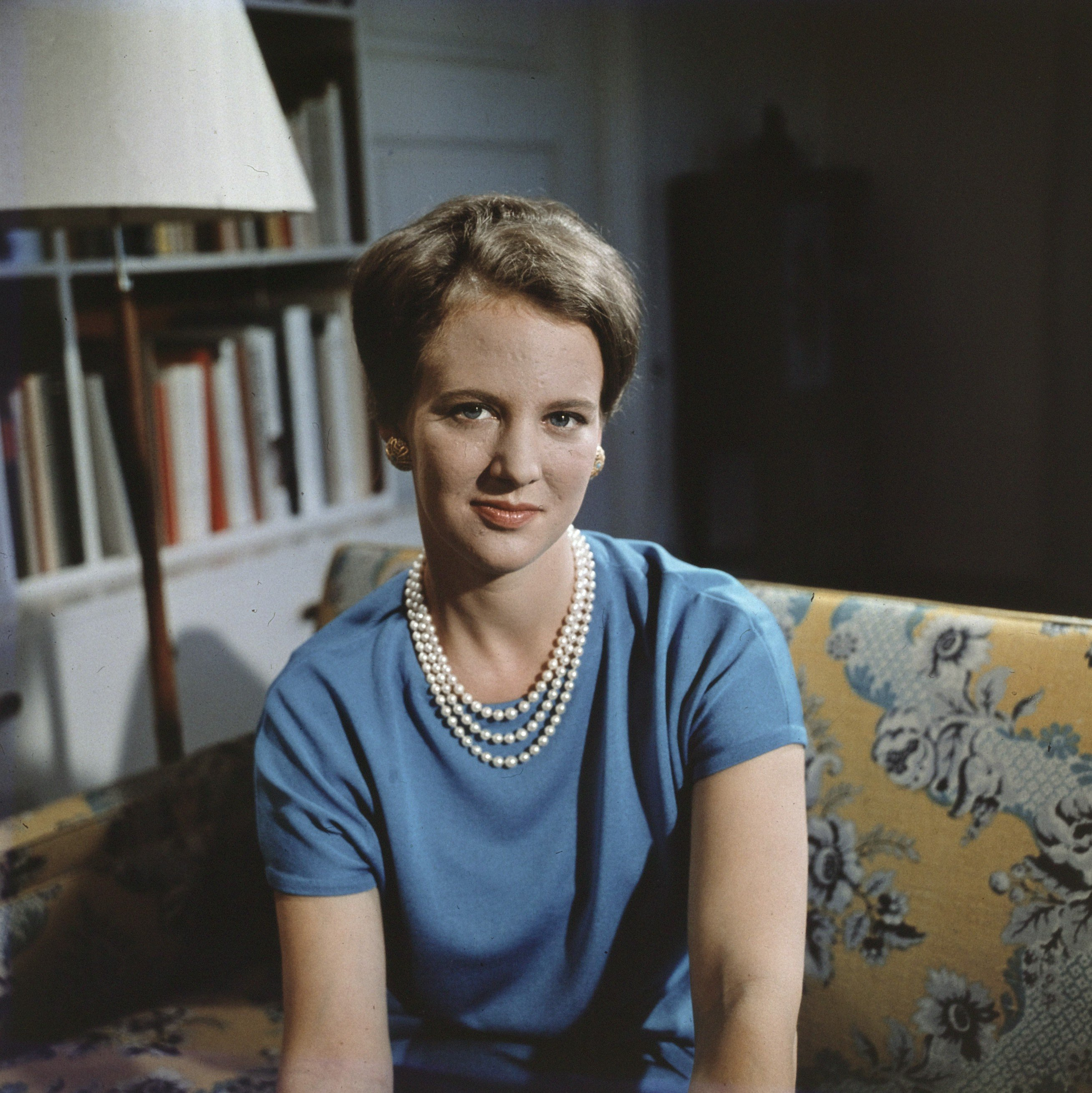
Princess Margrethe in August 1966

At the time of her birth, only males could accede to the throne of Denmark, owing to the changes in succession laws enacted in the 1850s when the Glücksburg branch was chosen to succeed. As Margrethe had no brothers, it was assumed that her uncle Prince Knud would one day assume the throne.

The process of changing the constitution started in 1947, not long after Margrethe's father acceded to the throne and it became clear that Queen Ingrid would have no more children. The popularity of Frederik and his daughters and the more prominent role of women in Danish life started the complicated process of altering the constitution. The law required that the proposal be passed by two successive Parliaments and then by a referendum, which occurred on 27 March 1953. The new Act of Succession permitted female succession to the throne of Denmark, according to male-preference cognatic primogeniture, where a female can accede to the throne only if she does not have a brother. Princess Margrethe therefore became heir presumptive. In 2009, the law of succession was modified into absolute primogeniture.

Margrethe attended the traditional New Year Courts for the first time in 1956. On her eighteenth birthday, 16 April 1958, Margrethe was given a seat in the Council of State. She subsequently chaired the meetings of the Council in the absence of the King. In 1960, with her first cousin, Princess Margaretha of Sweden, and Princess Astrid of Norway, she travelled to the United States, which included a visit to Los Angeles, and to the Paramount Studios, where they met several celebrities, including Dean Martin, Jerry Lewis and Elvis Presley.

She paid her first visit to the Faroe Islands in 1959, alongside her parents and sisters, and to Greenland in 1960.

=== Marriage and family ===
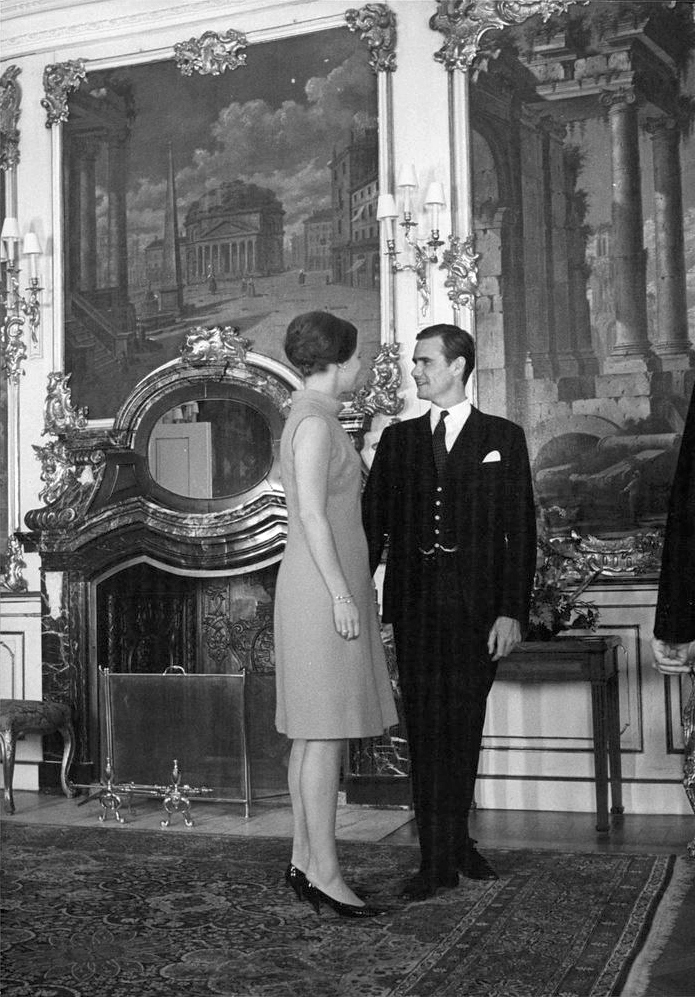
Margrethe and Henri in 1966

While Margrethe studied in London, she met the French diplomat Henri de Laborde de Monpezat, who was legation secretary at the French Embassy in London. Their engagement was announced on 5 October 1966. They were married on 10 June 1967, at the Holmen Church in Copenhagen, and the wedding reception was held at Fredensborg Palace. Laborde de Monpezat received the style and title of "His Royal Highness Prince Henrik of Denmark" because of his new position as the spouse of the heir presumptive to the Danish throne. They were married for more than fifty years, until his death on 13 February 2018.

Less than a year after the wedding, Margrethe gave birth to her first child, a son, on 26 May 1968. By tradition, Danish kings were alternately named either Frederik or Christian. She chose to maintain this by assuming the position of a Christian, and thus named her elder son Frederik. The following year, a second child, named Joachim, was born on 7 June 1969.

In 1974, she and Henrik purchased Château de Cayx in the wine district of Cahors in Southern France.

Among others, Margrethe is the godmother of King Willem-Alexander of the Netherlands, King Haakon VIII of Norway, and Prince Carl Philip of Sweden as well as actress Ellen Hillingsø and politician Marcus Knuth. She is a close personal friend of Queen Sonja of Norway with whom she shares a love of the arts. They previously went on yearly skiing trips together.

Margrethe announced in 2008 that her male-line descendants would bear the additional title of Count or Countess of Monpezat in recognition of her husband's ancestry.

In 2022, the Queen announced that, from the start of 2023, the descendants of Prince Joachim will only be able to use their titles of Count and Countess of Monpezat, their previous titles of Prince and Princess of Denmark ceasing to exist. To allow the children, who were never expected to hold an official role within the royal family, to have normal lives, the Queen wanted "to create a framework for the four grandchildren, to a much greater degree, to be able to shape their own existence without being limited by the special considerations and obligations that a formal affiliation with the Royal House as an institution implies". Her son, Joachim, daughter-in-law, Marie, former daughter-in-law, Alexandra, and eldest grandson, Nikolai, publicly expressed shock and confusion because of the decision, after which Margrethe released a statement in which she said that it saddened her that she had upset Joachim's family.

Along with her late husband, Margrethe has kept dachshunds since the 1970s. As of April 2026, she has one dog, the dachshund Tilia, who was Prince Henrik's dog until his death in 2018 (her own dog, Helike, passed away the same year).

== Reign ==
=== Accession ===
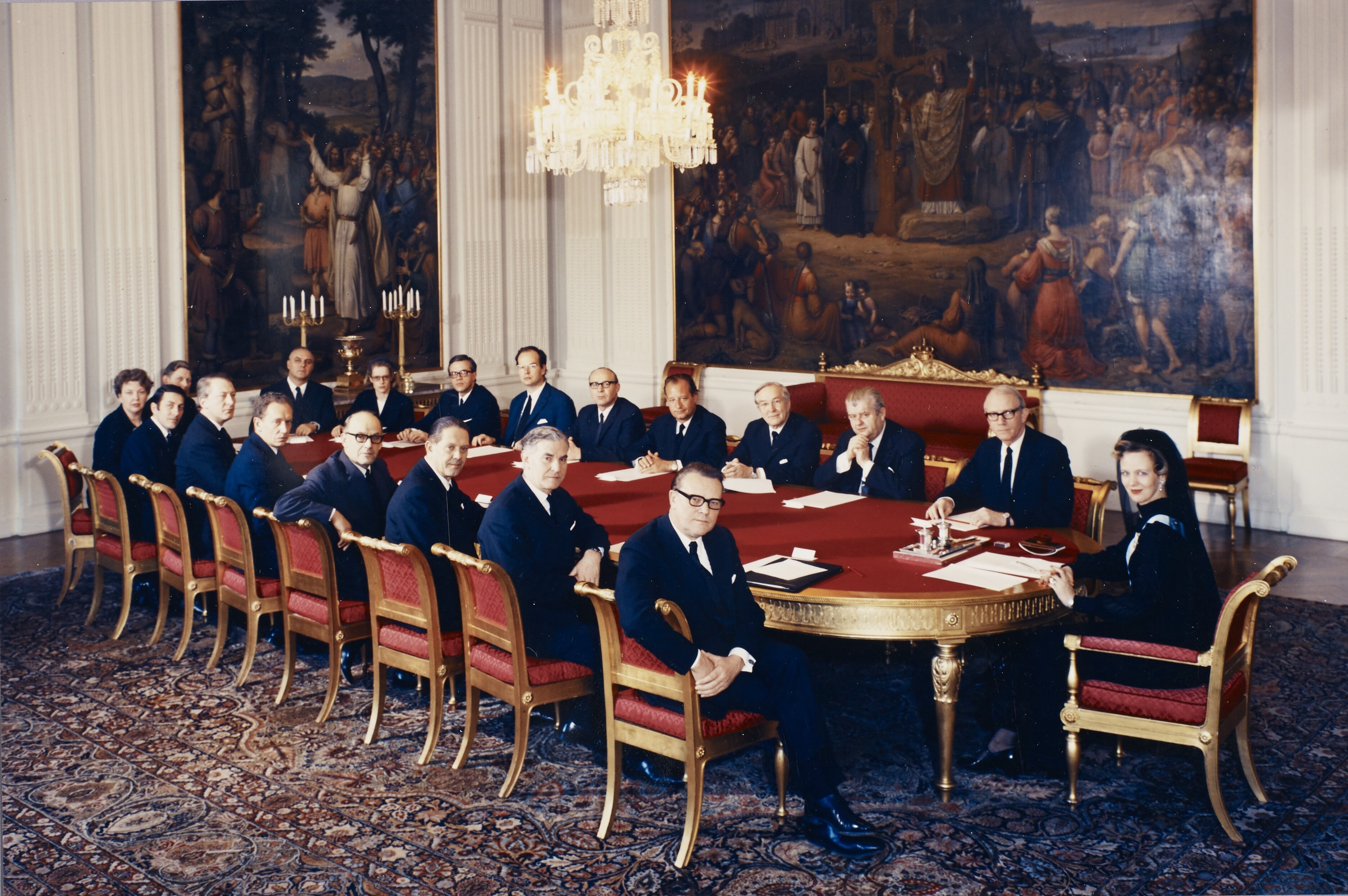
Margrethe (seated right) chairing a meeting of the Council of State on the day of her proclamation

On 3 January 1972, three days after King Frederik IX delivered his New Year's address, he suffered a heart attack and was admitted to the Copenhagen Municipal Hospital. Margrethe was subsequently designated regent due to her father's declining health. She ascended the throne on Frederik's death on 14 January, becoming the first female Danish sovereign under the new Act of Succession. The following day, Prime Minister Jens Otto Krag led her formal proclamation ceremony from the balcony of Christiansborg Palace, in which she also announced her royal motto as "God's help, the love of the people, Denmark's strength" (Danish: Guds hjælp, folkets kærlighed, Danmarks styrke).

After becoming queen, she relinquished all of the monarch's traditional titles except the title to Denmark, with her style henceforth becoming "Queen of Denmark". She also chose her regnal name in recognition of Margrethe I, who was de facto queen regnant of the Kalmar Union in the 14th century.

=== Constitutional role ===
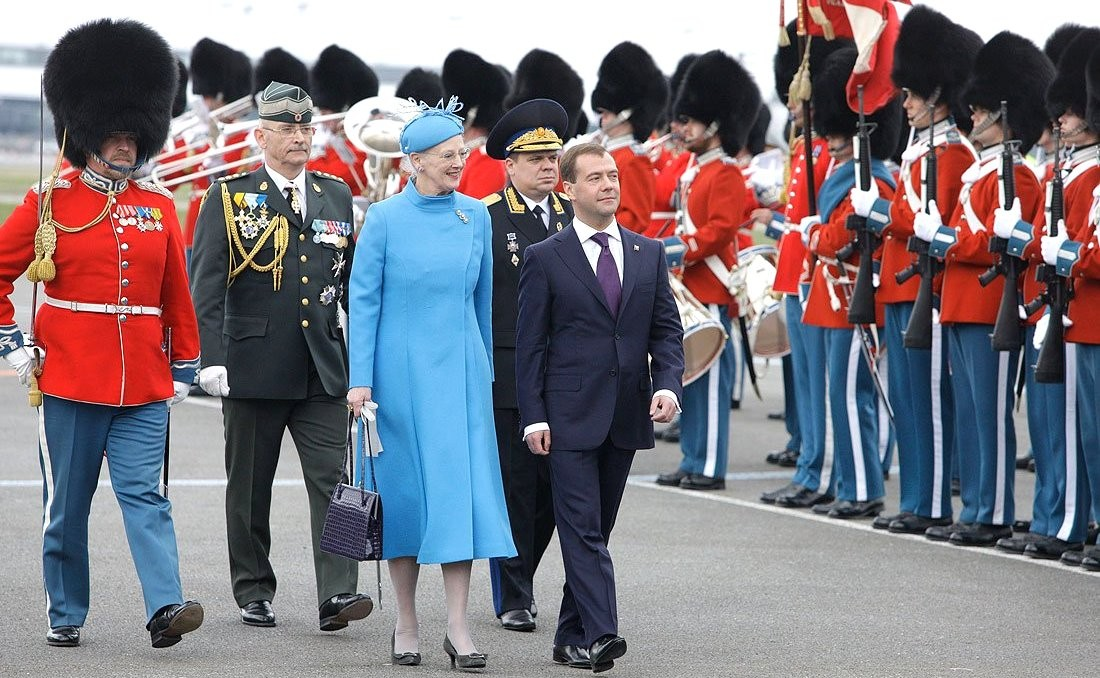
Margrethe hosting Russian President Dmitry Medvedev in Denmark, April 2010

The Queen's main tasks were to represent the kingdom abroad and to be a unifying figure at home. She performed the latter by opening exhibitions, attending anniversaries and inaugurating bridges, among other things. She received foreign ambassadors and awards, honours and medals.

As a constitutional sovereign, Margrethe took no part in party politics and does not express any political opinions. Although she had the right to vote, she opted not to do so to avoid even the appearance of partisanship.

The Queen held a meeting with the prime minister and the foreign affairs minister every Wednesday, unless either she or the prime minister was outside of the kingdom.

After an election where the incumbent prime minister does not have a majority behind him or her, the Queen held a "Dronningerunde" (Queen's meeting) in which she met the chairmen of each of the Danish political parties.

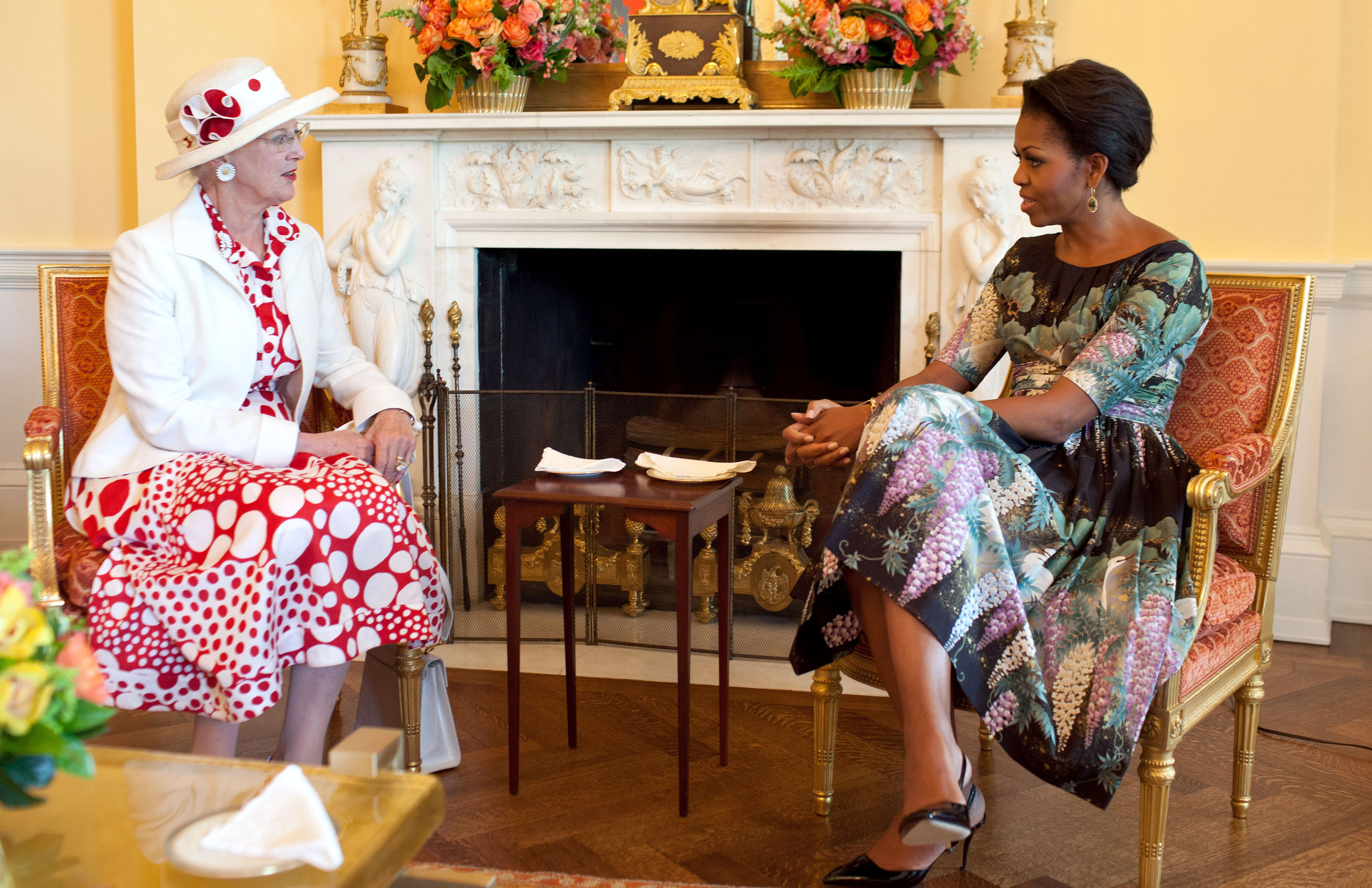
Margrethe with Michelle Obama at the White House, June 2011

Each party has the choice of selecting a royal investigator to lead these negotiations or alternatively, give the incumbent prime minister the mandate to continue his or her government as is. In theory each party could choose its own leader as royal investigator, as the social liberal Det Radikale Venstre did in 2006, but often only one royal investigator is chosen plus the prime minister, before each election. The leader who, at that meeting, succeeds in securing a majority of the seats in the Folketing, is, by royal decree, charged with the task of forming a new government. (No party has held an absolute majority in the Folketing since 1903.)

Once the government had been formed, the Queen formally appointed it. Officially, it was the monarch who was the head of state, and she therefore presided over the Council of State (privy council), where the acts of legislation which have been passed by the parliament are signed into law. In practice, nearly all of the Queen's formal powers were exercised by the Cabinet of Denmark.

It was customary for Margrethe, as the Danish monarch, to host the annual New Year levées. Every year on 1 January, a banquet was held for the government, the Speaker of the Danish Parliament, representatives of official Denmark and the Royal Court at Christian VIII's Palace at Amalienborg. On day two, a levée was held at Christian VIII's Palace for the justices of Supreme Court of Denmark and the Officer Corps of the Royal Life Guards and the Guard Hussar Regiment, followed by a levée at Christiansborg Palace for the diplomatic corps. On day three, a levée was held for officers from the Ministry of Defence and the Danish Emergency Management Agency, the I., II. and III. ranking classes as well as invited representatives of major national organisations and the royal patronages.

=== Official duties ===
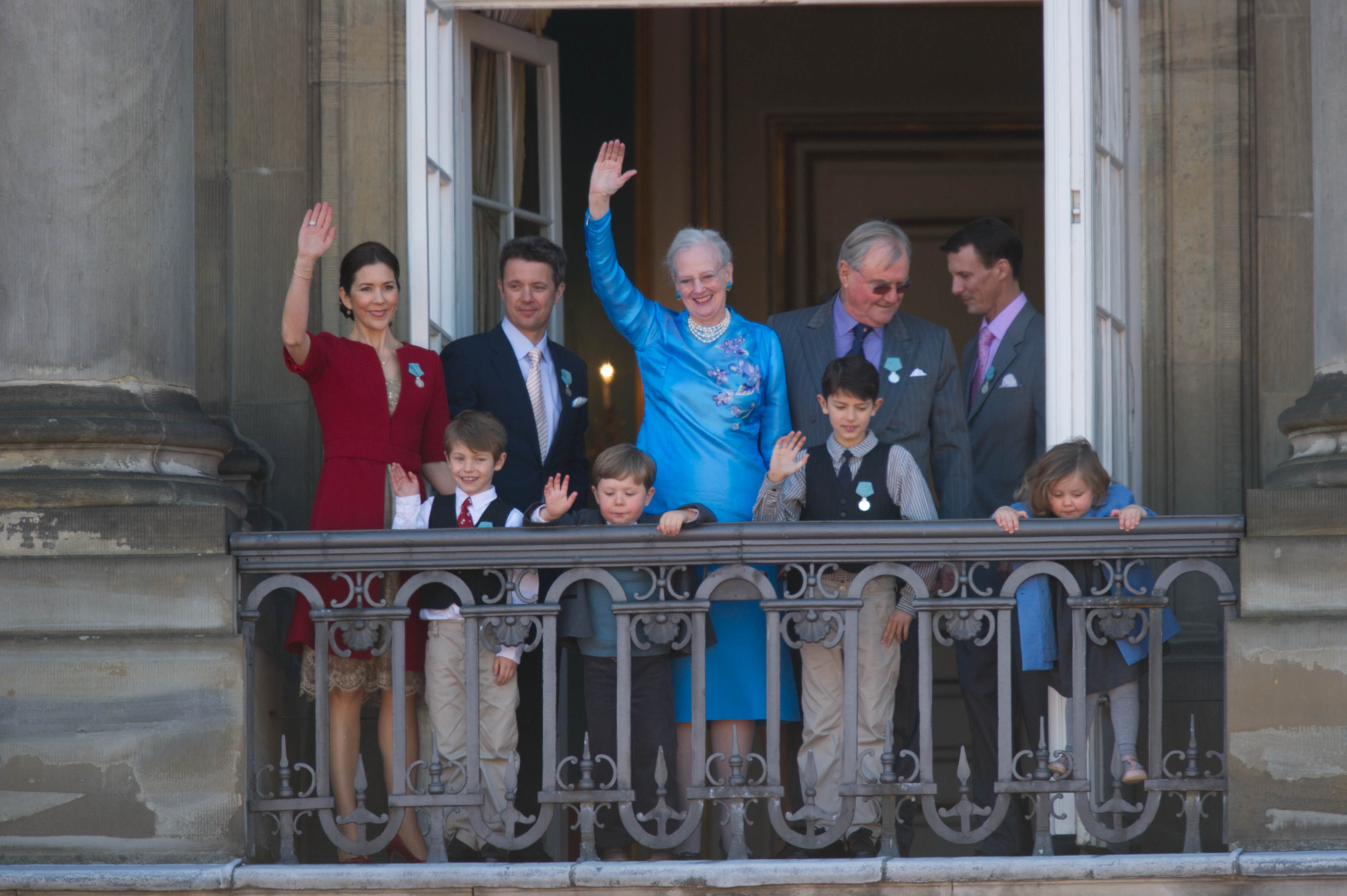
Margrethe surrounded by her family waving to crowds on her 70th birthday in April 2010

Up to the end of her reign, Margrethe held 72 Danish and eight foreign patronages as queen, including Aarhus Festuge, ARoS Aarhus Kunstmuseum, DaneAge Association, Danes Worldwide, the Danish Animal Welfare Society, the Danish Cancer Society, Den Gamle By, Det Classenske Fideicommis, the Danish Bible Society, Det Kongelige Vajsenhus, Diakonissestiftelsen, Foreningen Norden, Land of Legends (Sagnlandet Lejre), M/S Maritime Museum of Denmark, Moesgaard Museum, National Olympic Committee and Sports Confederation of Denmark, Nyborg Slot, Rebild National Park, the Royal Danish Academy of Music, Royal Danish Academy of Sciences and Letters, Royal Danish Yacht Club, Rungstedlund Foundation, Sankt Lukas Stiftelsen, Vallø stift and Vemmetofte.

A pillar of her reign was an intricate knowledge of and connection to all parts of the Danish Realm. In 2016, she contributed to a book about Denmark's history.

Until her abdication, Margrethe served as colonel-in-chief of the Princess of Wales's Royal Regiment, an infantry regiment of the British Army, following a tradition dating back to 1906 when Edward VII, married to Alexandra of Denmark, appointed his brother-in-law, Frederik VIII of Denmark, colonel-in-chief of the then Buffs (Royal East Kent Regiment).

As sovereign, Margrethe received 42 official state visits and she undertook 55 foreign state visits herself. She and the royal family have made several other foreign visits.

=== Residences ===
As queen, Margrethe's official residences were Amalienborg (where she resides at Christian IX's Palace) in Copenhagen and Fredensborg Palace near Hillerød. Her summer residences were Marselisborg Palace near Aarhus and Gråsten Palace near Sønderborg, the former home of her mother, Queen Ingrid, who died in 2000.

=== Immigration debate ===
In her New Year's address at the end of 1984, the Queen addressed the xenophobia experienced by many immigrants in Denmark:

We have the peace, the free political life and social relations that make our country a sought-after haven for many. Refugees from very different backgrounds come here, sometimes injured in both mind and body. We welcome them and are probably also a little proud that they have chosen our little paradise, but when we see them fumbling with our way of life and our language, hospitality becomes difficult all too quickly, and disappointment sets in on both sides. There are also others who have felt that, namely the guest workers and their families (...) Then we come with our 'Danish humour' and little cocky remarks. Then we meet them with coolness, and then it is not far to harassment and rougher methods—we cannot allow that. If we want the new year to be better than the old, then here is a good place to start.

The term "cocky remarks" (dumsmarte bemærkninger, lit. 'dumb-slick remarks') has since become an integrated part of the Danish vocabulary.

In an interview within the 2016 book De dybeste rødder (The Deepest Roots), according to historians at the Saxo Institute of the University of Copenhagen, Margrethe showed a change in attitude to immigration towards a more conservative stance. She stated that the Danish people should have more explicitly clarified the rules and values of Danish culture in order to be able to teach them to new arrivals. She further stated that the Danes in general have underestimated the difficulties involved in successful integration of immigrants, exemplified with the rules of a democracy not being clarified to Muslim immigrants and a lack of readiness to enforce those rules. This was received as a change in line with the attitude of the Danish people.

=== Silver, Ruby and Golden Jubilees ===
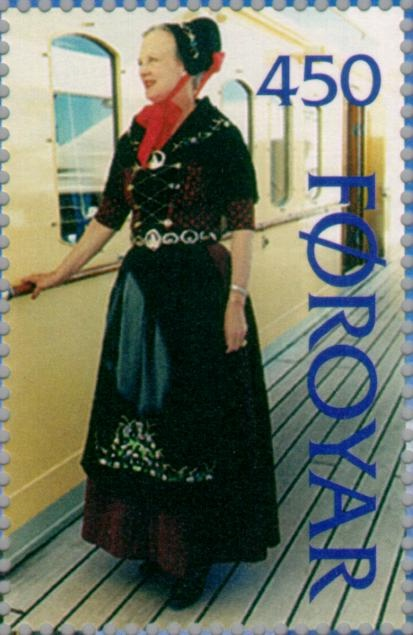
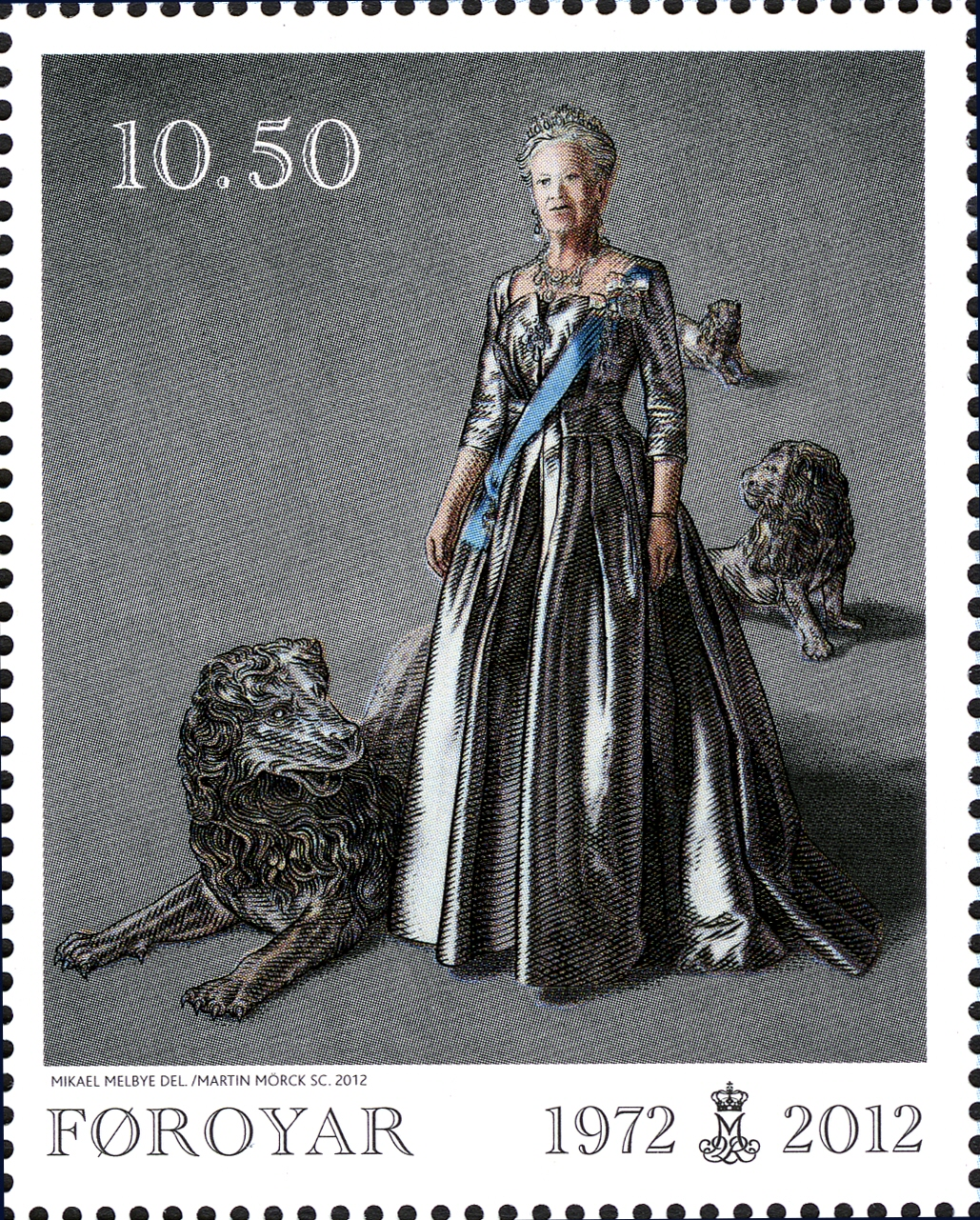
Faroese stamps marking the Queen's silver jubilee in 1997 and her ruby jubilee in 2012

Margrethe marked her Silver Jubilee in 1997 with a religious service and a gala dinner attended by fellow Scandinavian royals. She celebrated her Ruby Jubilee, the 40th year on the throne, on 14 January 2012. This was marked by a church service, concert, carriage procession, gala banquet at Christiansborg Palace and numerous TV interviews.

The Queen's Golden Jubilee was marked on 14 January 2022, with celebrations to take place later in the year. In September, following the death of Queen Elizabeth II of the United Kingdom, it was announced by the Royal House that it was "Her Majesty The Queen's wish that a number of adjustments be made" to the upcoming celebrations.

Between Elizabeth II's death and her abdication, Margrethe was Europe's longest-reigning monarch, the world's only queen regnant, and the longest-serving incumbent female head of state.

=== Sitting reign record ===
In July 2023, the Danish Royal House recognized Margrethe II as Denmark's longest-reigning sitting monarch. Though Christian IV reigned for more than 59 years between 1588 and 1648, he was not officially installed until 1596, ruling with a "guardian government" up until then.

=== Abdication ===
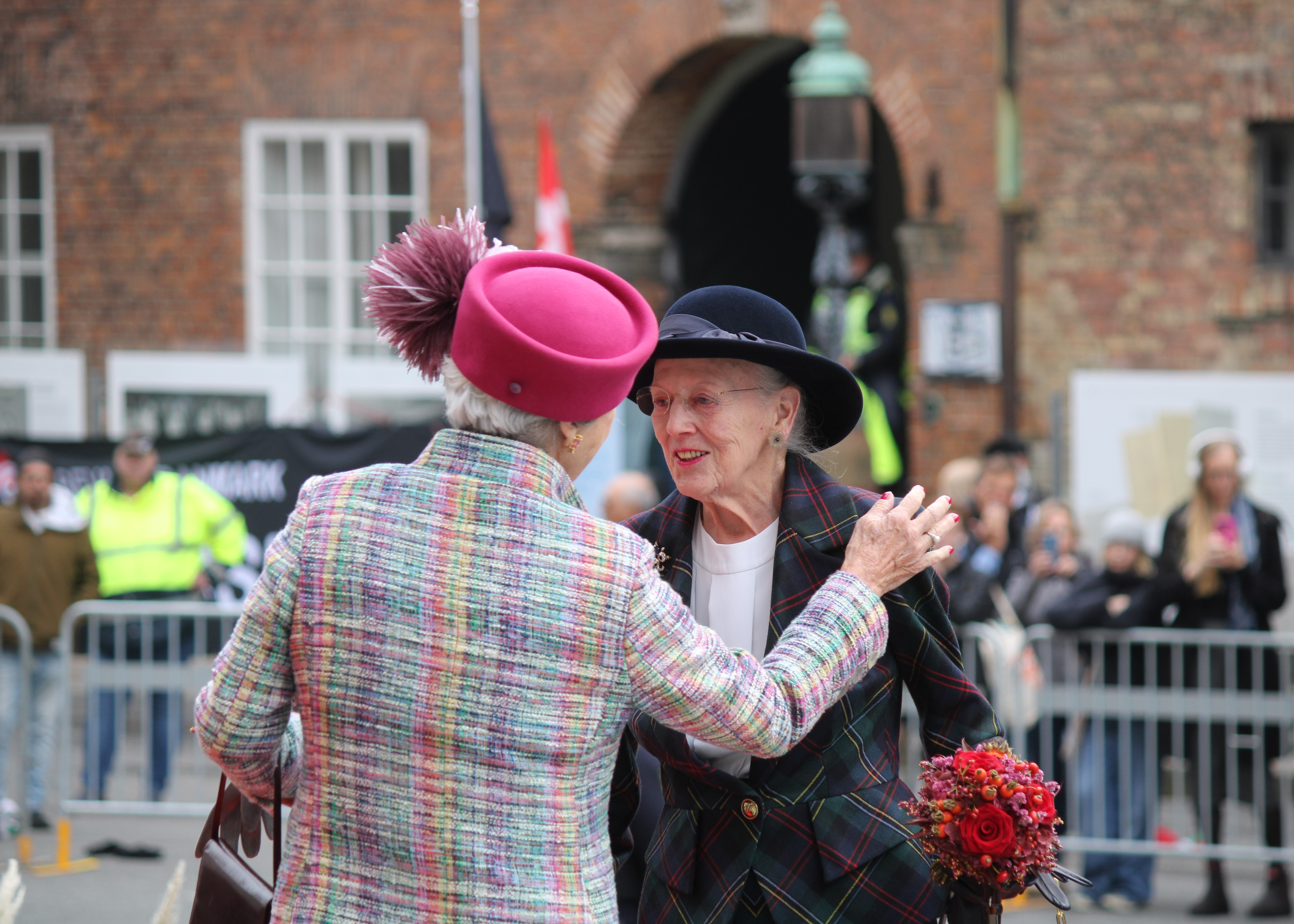
Margrethe greeting her sister Benedikte at the 2025 opening of parliament

In her annual live broadcast New Year's Eve address on 31 December 2023, Margrethe announced her abdication, which took place on 14 January 2024, the 52nd anniversary of her accession to the throne. She said that time had taken its "toll", that her number of "ailments" had increased, and that she cannot undertake as many duties as in the past. She cited her extensive back surgery in February, and said that the operation made her reassess her position and consider "whether now would be an appropriate time to pass on the responsibility to the next generation".

Margrethe's elder son, Frederik, assumed the throne as Frederik X. Mirroring her first New Year Address in 1973, she said of the succession: "The support and assistance which I have received throughout the years, have been crucial to the success of my task. It is my hope that the new King and Queen will be met with the same trust and devotion which have fallen to my lot."

Since her abdication, she has been referred to as "Her Majesty Queen Margrethe". She is eligible to serve as regent in the event of the incapacity or absence of the King and Crown Prince Christian.

In October 2025, Margrethe undertook her first official visit abroad after her abdication when she visited Rome, Italy, in honour of the 10th anniversary of Queen Margrethe's Roman Prize, which aims to strengthen cultural ties between Denmark and Italy.

== Health issues ==
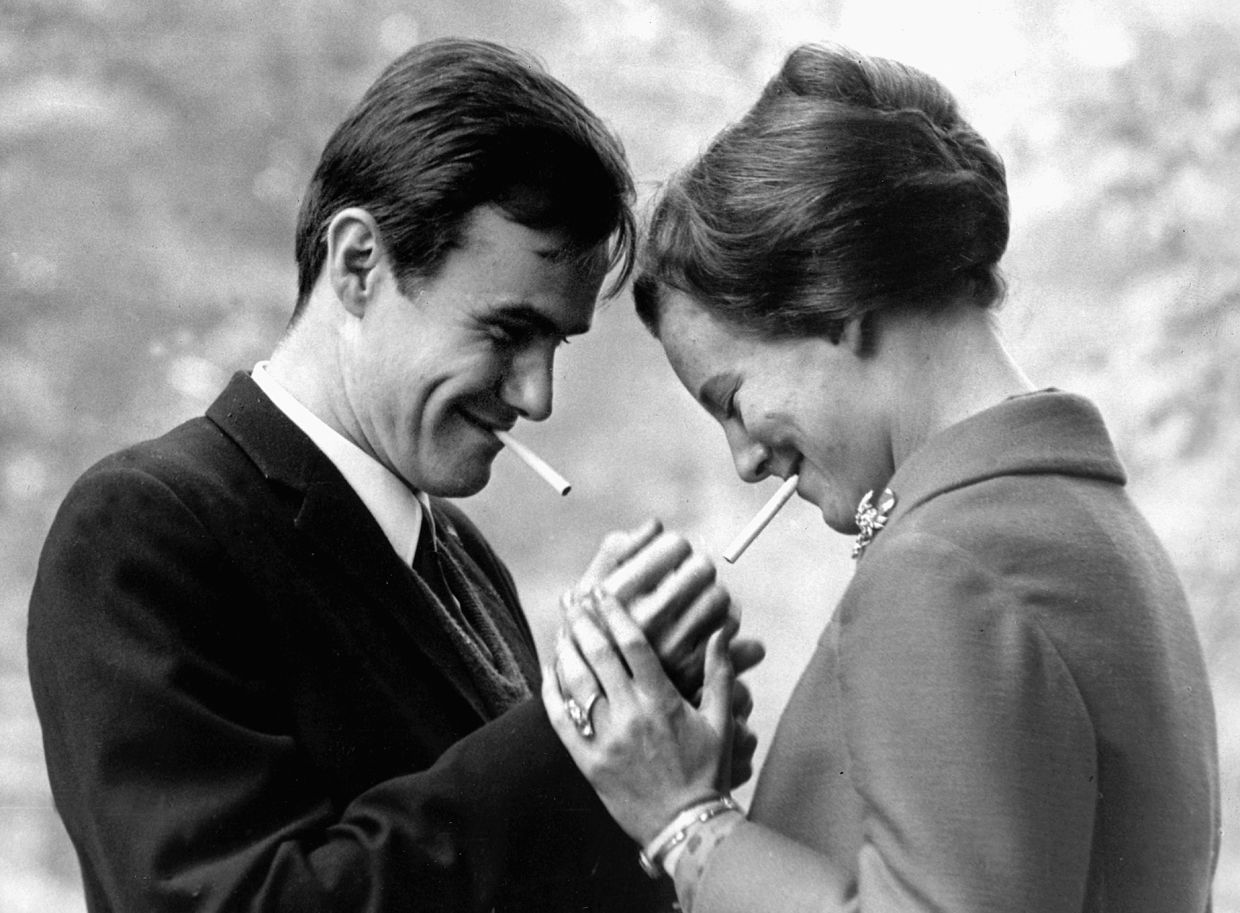
Henrik lighting a cigarette for Margrethe, 1966

Queen Margrethe II has had a number of health issues. Since the 1990s, she has undergone several operations on her right knee due to injuries and osteoarthritis. In 1994, she was treated for cervical cancer. In 2003, she underwent a four-and-a-half-hour-long operation for spinal stenosis.

On 9 February 2022, the Danish court disclosed in a press release that the Queen had contracted COVID-19. On 13 February, the Queen was able to leave home isolation after having had a mild case of the virus. On 21 September 2022, the Danish Royal House disclosed in a press release that Margrethe had tested positive for COVID-19 a second time after attending the state funeral of Elizabeth II, her third cousin, in London. She left home isolation again on 26 September and resumed her official duties immediately, stating that she felt fine.

On 22 February 2023, the Queen underwent "major back surgery" at Rigshospitalet due to continued back pain. In a statement the following day, a representative for the Queen said that the surgery had gone well and that she had already been up for a walk. She was discharged from the hospital on 2 March, and returned from sick leave on her birthday on 16 April.

Margrethe has been a chain smoker and was well known for her tobacco habit. On 23 November 2006, the Danish newspaper B.T. printed an announcement from the Royal Court that the Queen would henceforth smoke only in private. In 2023, the Court confirmed that Margrethe had quit smoking in connection with her back surgery the same year.

In September 2024, she was hospitalised after a fall at Fredensborg Castle where she sustained a fractured wrist and injuries to the vertebrae of the neck for which she needed to wear a neck brace for more than a month. In May 2025, she was hospitalised for two days due to a cold. In May 2026, she was hospitalised due to angina pectoris. On 15 May, the monarchy released a statement saying that she had undergone a successful angioplasty and was recovering at Rigshospitalet. A week after being discharged, she was admitted to hospital again on 25 May for a blood clot in the hip region which was said to have developed following a fall in September 2025.

Originally expected to attend the funeral of her second cousin Harald V of Norway, it was later announced that Margrethe would miss the event after being hospitalised on 6 September 2026 and diagnosed with mild dehydration and a blood clot in the hip region.

== Public image and style ==
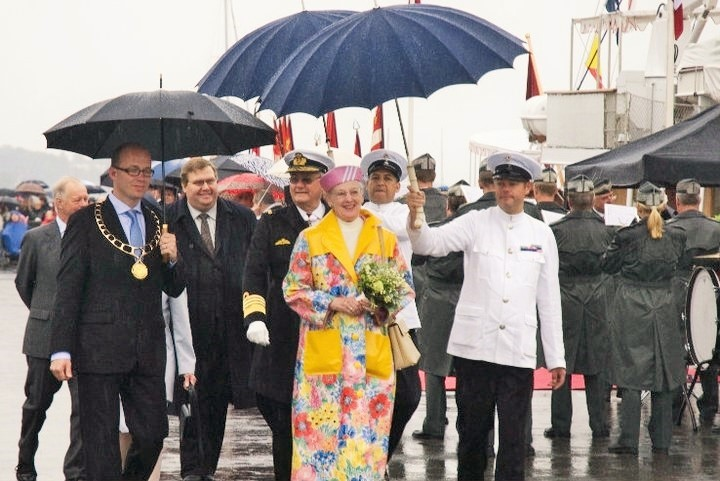
Margrethe wearing her famous yellow and floral raincoat, which was sewn out of a waxy outdoor tablecloth

Margrethe wears designs by former Pierre Balmain designer Erik Mortensen, Jørgen Bender, and Birgitte Taulow. In March 2013, The Guardian listed her as one of the fifty best-dressed over-50s. In connection with her 80th birthday, British Vogue published an article calling her "An Unsung Style Heroine."

A 2012 poll showed support for the monarchy in Denmark remained consistently high at around 82%, compared to less than half when she acceded to the throne in 1972.

The Queen has been depicted on the annual christmas seal twice—as a child in 1942 and following her accession to the throne in 1972.

Margrethe was included in Andy Warhol's portrait series in 1985 as one of four Reigning Queens, along with queens Ntfombi of Eswatini, Elizabeth II and Beatrix of the Netherlands.

== Tributes ==
Margrethe, a musical about Margrethe II premiered under Danish conductor Mikkel Rønnow's direction in June 2023 at The Royal Danish Theatre and since The Concert Hall of Aarhus.

A drama series titled da:Margrethe (serie) created by Søren Sveistrup and based on Queen Margrethe II's life from her birth to her becoming heir presumptive in 1953 will premiere on TV2 in 2027.

Upon her abdication in 2024, tributes were paid to Margrethe, not only in Denmark, but from around the world.

== Personal interests and artistic work ==
Alongside her sisters, Margrethe started dancing ballet as a child and she continued to take weekly lessons even after her accession to the throne. She first visited the Royal Danish Theatre in 1945 alongside her father for a performance of Elves' Hill. Margrethe has maintained avid engagement with the creative arts throughout her reign.

=== Archaeology ===
Margrethe is known for her strong archaeological passion and has participated in several excavations, including in Italy, Egypt, Denmark, Sudan and South America. In 1952, she visited the archaeological site at Illerup Ådal with her paternal grandmother, Queen Alexandrine, which was her first visit to an excavation site. She shared this interest with her grandfather, Gustaf VI Adolf of Sweden, with whom she visited multiple archaeological digs, among them in Etruria in 1962.

In the 2019 biography Dronning Margrethe, Margrethe revealed that if she hadn't been destined to become queen, she would have "tried to become an archaeologist".

=== Church textiles ===
Since the 1970s, Margrethe has designed and embroidered several vestments and church textiles for churches in Denmark, Greenland, Germany and England. She has designed a chasuble for Fredensborg Palace Church which was since embroidered by her mother, Queen Ingrid, and appliquéd by her sister, Princess Benedikte. The textile was presented to the church on its 250th anniversary in 1976. In 1989, Margrethe designed the bishop's robe for the Diocese of Viborg. In 2017, she designed the antependium for the All Saints' Church, Wittenberg, Germany. In 2020, she designed the chasuble for the Danish Church of St Katharine in the London Borough of Camden.

In addition to the church textiles, Margrethe has designed various other things including an altarpiece for Skei Mountain Church in Norway, a Christmas spoon, the annual Danish Christmas seals in 1970, 2003 and 2015, and Greenland's Christmas seal in 1983.

=== Découpage ===
Since the mid-1970s, Margrethe has been using the découpage technique, which involves combining clippings from periodicals and books for new motifs. This technique is used in auction catalogues, home magazines, and furniture decorations. The découpage often references literary, mythological, or art-historical topics, and is often displayed in royal palaces, particularly Christian VII's Palace at Amalienborg. Sealed with a protective lacquer, the Queen's découpage works generally have references to literary, mythological or art-historical topics.

Margrethe's découpage works have also been used in various books and films, including Prince Henrik's poetry collections Cantabile (2000) and Frihjul (2010). Eighty-one découpages she designed were the basis for the sets of the 2023 film Ehrengard: The Art of Seduction.

=== Embroidery ===
As a child, Margrethe preferred drawing rather than needlework, but since 1960, numerous embroideries have been presented as gifts or used in the Queen's own rooms. The embroideries are made from patterns that Margrethe herself creates on graph paper, which includes twining shapes and the recipient's monogram. The Queen has designed several embroideries for the Danish Handcraft Guild, including patterns for calendars, cushion covers and dinner mats. Margrethe has also designed evening bags and spectacle cases for friends and family members, including Christmas calendars for all of the grandchildren, cushion covers and furniture covers for the palaces, and fireplace screens for Fredensborg Palace.

The Queen's private embroideries were exhibited at Koldinghus Castle in 2021.

=== Films ===
The Queen has worked as a screenwriter alongside Per Brink Abrahamsen on the two Hans Christian Andersen adaptations The Snow Queen from 2000 and The Wild Swans from 2009. Additionally, she narrated the former and made an uncredited acting cameo as a "member of the mob" in the latter.

Using decoupage as her primary craft, she has also been a set designer for:

- The Snow Queen (2000)
- The Wild Swans (2009)
- Ehrengard: The Art of Seduction (2023)

For her work on Ehrengard: The Art of Seduction, Margrethe won the Robert Award for Best Costume Design at the 41st Robert Awards on 3 February 2024. She was also nominated in the category Best Production Design.

=== Monograms ===
Margrethe's royal monogram (left) and her personal monogram (right)

In 2004, Margrethe designed the official monogram of her second cousin twice removed, Princess Ingrid Alexandra of Norway.

=== Scenography and costume design ===
Over the years, Margrethe has become involved in ballet as a scenographer and costume designer. She designed the costumes for the Royal Danish Ballet's production of A Folk Tale and for the 2009 Peter Flinth film, De vilde svaner (The Wild Swans). She also designs her own clothes and is known for her colourful and sometimes eccentric clothing choices. The Queen designed 51 costumes for the 2023 film Ehrengard: The Art of Seduction as well as 81 découpages that were the basis for the sets.

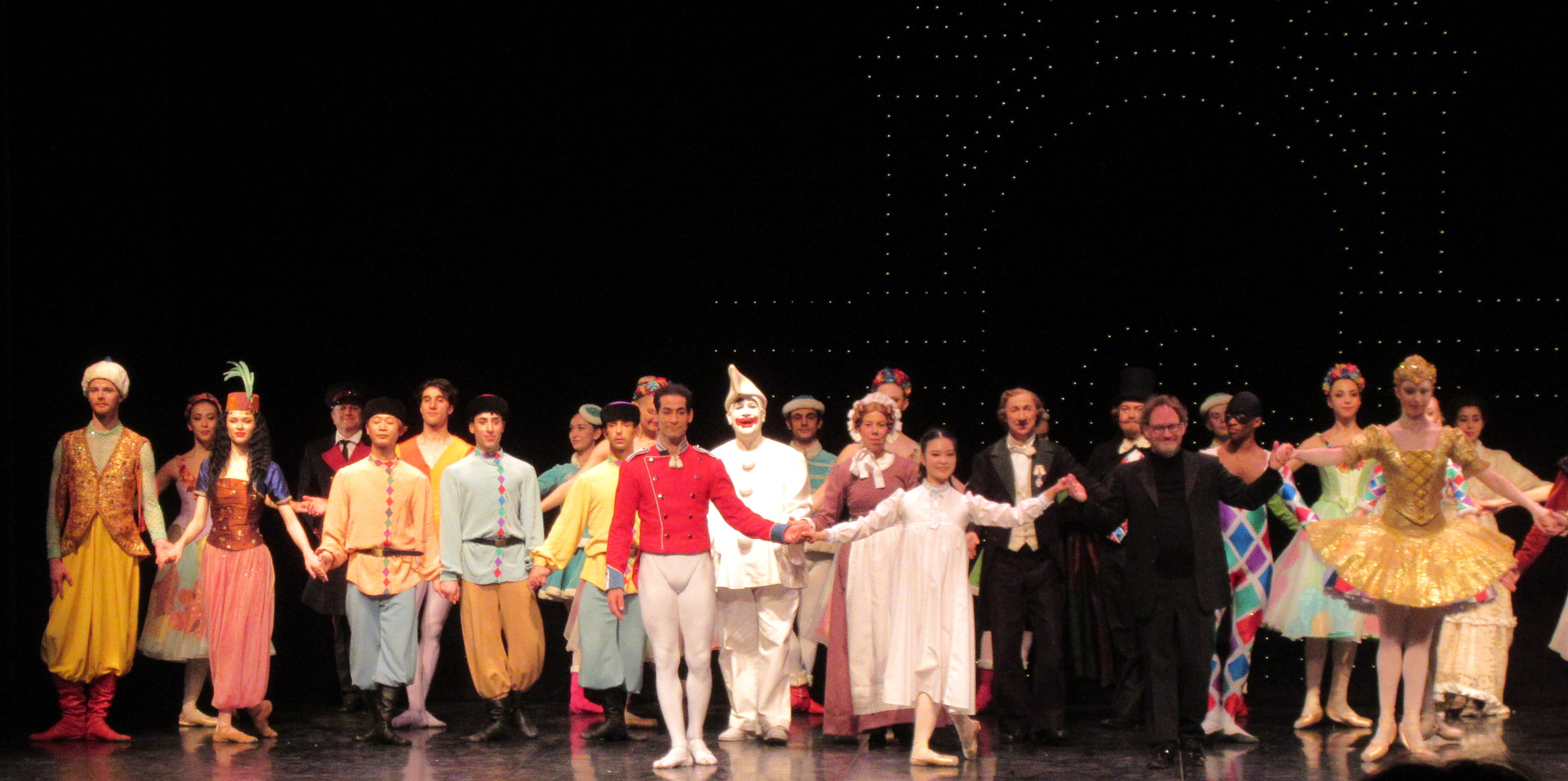
Performance of The Nutcracker in Tivoli Concert Hall in 2022 with costumes designed by Her Majesty Queen Margrethe

Margrethe has designed sets and costumes for numerous ballets. Since 2001, she has worked with the Tivoli Ballet Theatre:

- 1991: A Folk Tale, Royal Danish Theatre
- 2005 & 2011: Thumbelina, Pantomimeteatret
- 2007, 2013 & 2018: The Tinderbox, Pantomimeteatret
- 2009: The Swineherd, Pantomimeteatret
- 2012, 2014, 2016, 2018, 2022 & 2024: The Nutcracker, Tivoli Concert Hall
- 2013: The Steadfast Tin Soldier, Pantomimeteatret
- 2016 & 2025: Cinderella, Pantomimeteatret
- 2019, 2021, 2023 & 2025: The Snow Queen, Tivoli Concert Hall
- 2024 & 2025: Blockhead Hans, Pantomimeteatret

=== Visual art ===
Margrethe is an accomplished painter and has exhibited many of her works over the years. In 2000, she illustrated Prince Henrik's poetry collection Cantabile. Under the title From mountains to coast, she and her close friend, Queen Sonja of Norway, exhibited selected works inspired by nature at the Barony Rosendal in 2015.

Under the pseudonym Ingahild Grathmer (the latter being an anagram for Margrethe and the former made up of her secondary names Ingrid, Alexandrine and Þórhildur), her illustrations were used for Danish editions of The Lord of the Rings, which she was encouraged to illustrate in the early 1970s. She sent them to J. R. R. Tolkien, who was struck by the similarity of her drawings to his own style.

== Honours ==
=== National ===
- Denmark:
  - 20 April 1947: Knight of the Order of the Elephant (R.E.)
    - 14 January 1972 – 14 January 2024: Sovereign of the Order of the Elephant
  - 14 January 1972: Grand Commander of the Order of the Dannebrog (S.Kmd.)
    - 14 January 1972 – 14 January 2024: Sovereign of the Order of the Dannebrog
  - Knight of the Decoration of the Cross of Honour of the Dannebrog (D.Ht.)
  - Homeguard Medal of Merit
  - 25 years of Homeguard Service Medal
  - Medal of Honour of the League of Civil Defence
  - Medal of Honour of the Reserve Officers League
  - 100th Anniversary Medal of the Birth of King Christian X
  - 50th Anniversary Medal of the arrival of Queen Ingrid to Denmark
  - 100th Anniversary Medal of the Birth of King Frederik IX
  - Queen Ingrid Commemorative Medal
- Greenland:
  - Nersornaat Medal for Meritorious Service, 1st Class

=== Foreign ===
- Argentina: Grand Cross of the Order of the Liberator San Martín
- Austria: Grand Star of the Decoration of Honour for Services to the Republic of Austria
- Belgium: Grand Cordon of the Order of Leopold I
- Brazil: Grand Collar of the Order of the Southern Cross
- Bulgaria: Sash of the Order of the Stara Planina
- Chile: Grand Cross of the Order of the Merit of Chile
- Croatia: Grand Cross of the Grand Order of King Tomislav
- Estonia: Collar of the Order of the Cross of Terra Mariana
- Egypt: Collar of the Order of the Nile
- Finland: Grand Cross with Collar of the Order of the White Rose
- France: Grand Cross of the Order of the Legion of Honour
- Germany: Grand Cross Special Class of the Order of Merit of the Federal Republic of Germany
- Greece:
  - (Kingdom of Greece) Greek Royal Family: Dame Grand Cross, Special Class of the Royal Order of Saints Olga and Sophia
  - Greece: Grand Cross of the Order of the Redeemer
- Iceland: Collar with Grand Cross Breast Star of the Order of the Falcon
- (Iran) Iranian Imperial Family: Member 2nd Class of the Order of the Pleiades
- Italy: Knight Grand Cross with Collar of the Order of Merit of the Italian Republic
- Japan:
  - Collar of the Order of the Chrysanthemum
  - Grand Cordon (Paulownia) of the Order of the Precious Crown
- Jordan: Collar of the Order of Al-Hussein bin Ali
- Latvia: Commander Grand Cross with Chain of the Order of the Three Stars
- Lithuania: Grand Cross of the Order of Vytautas the Great
- Luxembourg: Knight of the Order of the Gold Lion of the House of Nassau
- Mexico: Collar of the Order of the Aztec Eagle
- Morocco: Grand Cordon of the Order of Ouissam Alaouite
- Netherlands: Knight Grand Cross of the Order of the Netherlands Lion
- Kingdom of Nepal: Member of the Nepal Decoration of Honour
- Norway:
  - Grand Cross with Collar of the Order of St. Olav
  - Recipient of the Silver Jubilee Medal of King Olav V
  - Recipient of the Silver Jubilee Medal of King Harald V
- Peru: Grand Cross with Diamonds of the Order of the Sun of Peru
- Poland:
  - Knight of the Order of the White Eagle
  - Grand Cross of the Order of Merit of the Republic of Poland
- Portugal:
  - Grand Collar of the Military Order of Saint James of the Sword
  - Grand Collar of the Order of Prince Henry
- Romania: Collar of the Order of the Star of Romania
- Saudi Arabia: Collar of the Order of Abdulaziz Al Saud
- Slovakia: Grand Cross of the Order of the White Double Cross
- Slovenia: Member 1st Class of the Order of Freedom of the Republic of Slovenia
- Spain:
  - Lady of the Order of the Golden Fleece
  - Dame of the Collar of the Order of Charles III
- Sweden:
  - Member of the Royal Order of the Seraphim
  - Recipient of the 85th Birthday Medal of King Gustaf VI Adolf
  - Recipient of the 40th Birthday Medal of King Carl XVI Gustaf
  - Recipient of King Carl XVI Gustaf's 70th Birthday Commemorative Sign
- South Africa: Grand Collar of the Order of Good Hope
- South Korea: Recipient of the Grand Order of Mugunghwa
- Thailand:
  - Dame of the Order of the Rajamitrabhorn
  - Dame of the Order of the Royal House of Chakri
- United Arab Emirates: Grand Cordon of the Order of Al Kamal
- United Kingdom:
  - Stranger Lady Companion of the Order of the Garter (7th Lady since 1901; 1979)
  - Recipient of the Royal Victorian Chain (1974)
- Yugoslavia: Great Star of the Order of the Yugoslav Star

=== Awards ===
- 1989: Modersmål-Prisen
- 2004: The Hans Christian Andersen Award Committee's Honorary Award
- 2022: Foreningen Norden's Nordic Language Prize
- 2024: Robert Award for Best Costume Design at the 41st Robert Awards
- 2024: Association for Book Crafts' Honorary Award

=== Scholastic ===
==== Honorary degrees ====
Country	Date	School	Degree
England	1975	University of Cambridge	Doctor of Laws (LLD)
England	1980	University of London	Doctor of Laws (LLD)
Iceland	1986	University of Iceland	Doctor of Laws (LLD)
England	1992	University of Oxford	Doctor of Laws (LLD)
Scotland	2000	University of Edinburgh	Doctor of Laws (LLD)

==== Fellowships ====
Country	Date	School	Position
England	1975	London School of Economics	Honorary Fellow
England	1989	Lucy Cavendish College, Cambridge	Honorary Fellow
England	1992	Girton College, Cambridge	Honorary Fellow
Sweden	2026	Lund University	Honorary Fellow

=== Honorific eponyms ===
==== Awards ====
- Denmark: Queen Margrethe II's Science Award (2015)

==== Geographic locations ====
- Denmark: Margretheholm (1945)
- Denmark: The Queen's Boulevard (1979)
- Greenland: Queen Margrethe II Land in Northeast Greenland was named in her honour on 16 April 1990 on the occasion of her 50th birthday

==== Objects ====
- Denmark: The Margrethe Bowl designed by her uncle, Sigvard Bernadotte, for Rosti in 1947

==== Structures ====
- Denmark: Margrethe's Church in Valby (1968)
- Denmark: Queen Margrethe II's Bridge (2026)

=== Honorary military appointments ===
- (United Kingdom) 1972–1992: Colonel-in-Chief of the Queen's Regiment
- (United Kingdom) 1992–1997: Allied Colonel-in-Chief (with Diana, Princess of Wales) of the Princess of Wales's Royal Regiment
- (United Kingdom) 1997–2024: Colonel-in-Chief of the Princess of Wales's Royal Regiment

== See also ==
- Descendants of Christian IX of Denmark – Lists other members of European royalty who share a common ancestor with Margrethe II
- List of monarchs who abdicated
- Monarchy of Denmark
- Queen Margrethe's and Prince Henrik's Foundation

== Bibliography ==
- Andersen, Jens (2011). Nørholm, Elise H. (ed.). M, 40 år på tronen (in Danish) (1st ed.). Copenhagen: Lindhardt og Ringhof. ISBN 978-87-11-41969-4.
- Bloch Skipper, Jon (2008). Tre søstre: samtaler mellem dronning Margrethe, prinsesse Benedikte og dronning Anne-Marie [Three sisters: conversations between Queen Margrethe, Princess Benedikte and Queen Anne-Marie] (in Danish). Copenhagen: Lindhardt og Ringhof. ISBN 978-87-11-30060-2.
- Bramsen, Bo (1992). Huset Glücksborg. Europas svigerfader og hans efterslægt [The House of Glücksburg. The Father-in-law of Europe and his descendants] (in Danish) (2nd ed.). Copenhagen: Forlaget Forum. ISBN 87-553-1843-6.
- Dehn-Nielsen, Henning (2005). Margrethe 2., Danmarks dronning (in Danish) (3rd ed.). Copenhagen: Aschehoug. ISBN 87-11-22283-2.
- Fabricius Møller, Jes (2013). Dynastiet Glücksborg, en Danmarkshistorie [The Glücksborg Dynasty, a history of Denmark] (in Danish). Copenhagen: Gad. ISBN 978-87-12-04841-1.
- Lerche, Anna; Mandal, Marcus (2003). A royal family: the story of Christian IX and his European descendants. Copenhagen: Aschehoug. ISBN 978-87-15-10957-7.
- Lyding, Henrik (2009). Dronningens teater (in Danish). Copenhagen: Gyldendal. ISBN 978-87-02-07878-7.
- Margrethe II (2012). Andersen, Jens (ed.). Om man så må sige, 350 Dronning Margrethe-citater (in Danish). Copenhagen: Lindhardt og Ringhof. ISBN 978-87-11-39416-8.
- Rubinstein, Mogens (1996). Dronning Margrethe II, 25 år som regent (in Danish). Copenhagen: Møntergården. ISBN 87-7553-552-1.
- Scocozza, Benito (1997). "Margrethe 2.". Politikens bog om danske monarker [Politiken's book about Danish monarchs] (in Danish). Copenhagen: Politikens Forlag. pp. 204–209. ISBN 87-567-5772-7.
- Skipper, Jon Bloch (2008). Tre søstre, samtaler mellem dronning Margrethe, prinsesse Benedikte og dronning Anne-Marie (in Danish). Copenhagen: Lindhardt og Ringhof. ISBN 978-87-11-30060-2.

Margrethe II House of Glücksburg Cadet branch of the House of Oldenburg Born: 16 April 1940
Regnal titles
Preceded by Frederik IX	Queen of Denmark; 14 January 1972 – 14 January 2024	Succeeded by Frederik X
