= Tim Rushton =

Timothy John Rushton MBE (born 18 March 1963 in England) is a British choreographer and from 2001 to 2018 artistic leader of the Copenhagen-based Danish Dance Theatre, Denmark's largest modern dance company.

Tim Rushton was trained at The Royal Ballet School in Covent Garden, London, from 1979 to 1982, studying with Erik Bruhn, Frederick Ashton and Kenneth MacMillan. Later he danced with the Sadler's Wells Royal Ballet, now known as the Birmingham Royal Ballet. He was engaged at Deutsche Oper am Rhein between 1982 and 1986, Malmö City Theatre 1986-1987 and the Royal Danish Ballet 1987–1992. While a dancer at the Royal Danish Ballet he became interested in pursuing a choreographic career and decided to quit dancing.

Tim Rushton quickly made his marks as a choreographer, combining classical ballet technique with modern dance, and in 2001 he was appointed Artistic Director of the Danish Dance Theatre. As one of Northern Europe's leading choreographers, his choreographies have received thirteen nominations for – and four times won: 1999, 2005, 2006 and 2009 – that country's Reumert Prize.

As artistic leader of Danish Dance Theatre Rushton collaborated with writers, designers, visual artists and composers. He worked with a wide range of music spanning diverse genres, from classical masterpieces through to beat, jazz and newly commissioned compositions.

Further to Danish Dance Theatre's performances in Denmark, the company was touring extensively worldwide in Europe, Asia as well as in the United States.

Tim Rushton was appointed Member of the Order of the British Empire (MBE) in the 2011 New Year Honours for services to dance. He is listed in Kraks Blå Bog, the Danish Who's Who.

== Choreography ==
- 1995 La Lune Blanche
- 1995 Act of Faith
- 1998 Udflugt i det blå
- 1998 Refrain
- 1998 Sweet Complaint
- 1999 Busy Being Blue
- 1999 Clavigo
- 2000 Caught in the Act
- 2000 Schadenfreude
- 2000 Den Røde Ballon
- 2000 Nomade
- 2000 Monkey Business
- 2000 Dominium
- 2000 C´est Moi
- 2001 Shadowland
- 2001 Microcosmos
- 2002 Working Man
- 2002 Belá
- 2003 Napoli - den nye by
- 2004 Graffiti
- 2005 Silent Steps
- 2005 Kridt
- 2006 Confessions
- 2006 Insomnia
- 2006 Requiem
- 2007 Passion
- 2008 Labyrinth
- 2010 Enigma
- 2011 Monolith
- 2012 Walking in the night
- 2013 Den røde Ballon
- 2013 Le Sacre du Printemps
- 2013 Rød
- 2013 Love Songs
- 2014 Black Diamond
- 2014 Stormen
- 2014 The Diary of a Madman
- 2015 Carmina Burana
- 2016 Ildfuglen
