= Alvin Ailey =

American dancer and activist (1931–1989)

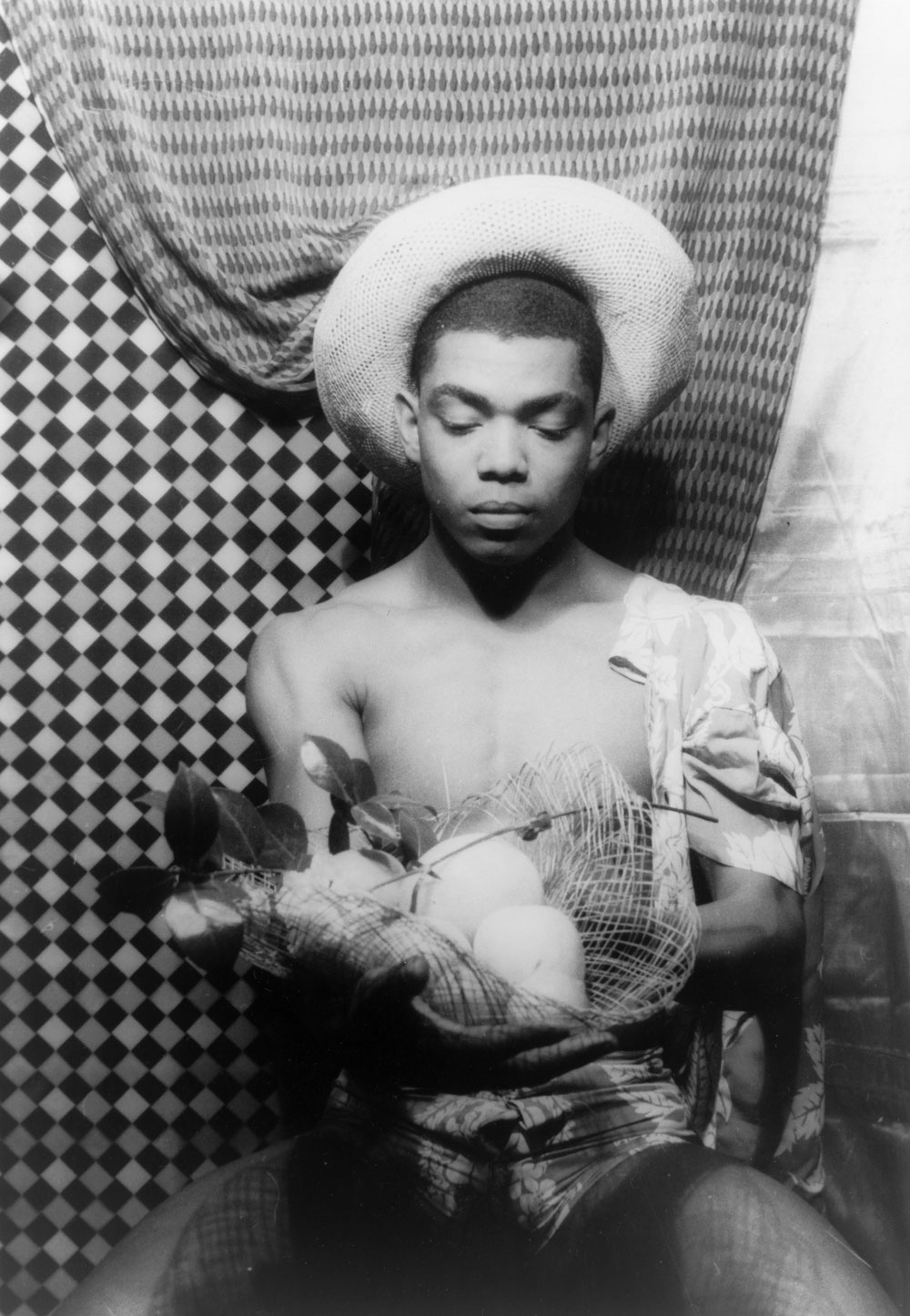
- Photo by Carl Van Vechten, 1955
- Born: January 5, 1931; Rogers, Texas, U.S.
- Died: December 1, 1989 (aged 58); Manhattan, New York City, U.S.
- Occupations: Dancer, choreographer
- Awards: Presidential Medal of Freedom, Kennedy Center Honors

Alvin Ailey Jr. (January 5, 1931 – December 1, 1989) was an American dancer, director, choreographer, and activist. He founded the Alvin Ailey American Dance Theater (AAADT) in 1958, and the Clark Center for the Performing Arts in 1959. He created AAADT and its affiliated Alvin Ailey American Dance Center (later Ailey School) as havens for nurturing Black artists and expressing the universality of the African-American experience through dance.

Ailey's work fused theater, modern dance, ballet, and jazz with Black vernacular, creating hope-fueled choreography that is credited with spreading global awareness of Black life in America. His choreographic masterpiece Revelations is recognized as one of the most popular and most performed ballets in the world.

On July 15, 2008, the United States Congress passed a resolution designating AAADT a "vital American cultural ambassador to the World". That same year, in recognition of AAADT's 50th anniversary, then Mayor Michael Bloomberg declared December 4 "Alvin Ailey Day" in New York City, while then-Governor David Paterson honored the organization on behalf of New York State.

== Early life and education ==
Ailey was born to Alvin Ailey and Lula Elizabeth Cliff in Rogers, Texas, in his maternal grandfather's home on January 5, 1931, at the height of the Great Depression. Growing up in the violently racist and segregated south, Ailey was barred from interacting with mainstream society during his youth. When he was five, Ailey's mother was raped by four white men (one likely an employer), and Ailey recalled seeing members of the Ku Klux Klan as a child.

The elder Alvin Ailey abandoned the young Alvin and Lula shortly after Alvin was born, leaving Lula to work in cotton fields and as a domestic in white homes — the only employment available to her. By the time Ailey was five, he joined his mother picking cotton. After white men raped Lula in 1936, Ailey began to fear white men. As an escape, Ailey found refuge in the church, sneaking out at night to watch adults dance, and in writing a journal, a practice that he maintained his entire life. Even this could not shield him from a childhood spent moving from town to town as his mother sought employment, being abandoned with relatives whenever she took off on her own.

Looking for greater job prospects, Ailey's mother departed for Los Angeles in 1941. He arrived a year later, enrolling at George Washington Carver Junior High School, and then graduating into Thomas Jefferson High School. Ailey was able to explore the arts in high school, singing in glee club and writing poetry. He also took gymnastics. Ailey frequently attended the Lincoln and Orpheum Theatres, where he was able to see a variety of African American performers, including Pearl Bailey, Fletcher Henderson, Billie Holiday, Lena Horne, Pigmeat Markham, Count Basie, and Duke Ellington. In 1946, Ailey had his first experience with concert dance when he saw Ballet Russe de Monte-Carlo on a school trip and Katherine Dunham Dance Company's "Tropical Review" on solitary trips to the Los Angeles Philharmonic Auditorium. This awakened an until then unknown spark of joy within Ailey.

Also in high school, Ailey discovered his homosexuality, which added another layer of difference and isolation to his already racially segregated experience. Thus, "like many young gay men eager to corral the sensual impulses of the body, he turned to dance study." Ailey briefly studied tap, followed by exploring "primitive dance", as taught by Dunham dancer Thelma Robinson. Neither of these styles were right for Ailey, possibly due to the physical location and old-fashioned sensibility of the lessons. Therefore, he did not become serious about dance until 1949 when his classmate and friend Carmen De Lavallade dragged Ailey to the Melrose Avenue studio of Lester Horton and he began exploring modern dance.

Ailey studied a wide range of dance styles and techniques — from ballet to Native American inspired movement studies — at Horton's school, which was one of the first racially integrated dance schools in the United States. Though Horton became his mentor, Ailey did not commit to dancing full-time, recognizing the lack of opportunities for black male dancers. Instead, he pursued academic courses, studying romance languages and writing at UCLA (1949), Los Angeles City College (1950–1951), and San Francisco State University (1952). During this time, Ailey sporadically returned to Horton to work between courses. Living in San Francisco, he met Maya Angelou, then known as Marguerite Johnson, with whom Ailey formed a nightclub act called "Al and Rita". Eventually, he returned to study dance with Horton in Los Angeles.

== Career ==
=== Horton Dance Company ===
Ailey joined Horton's dance company in 1953. While there, he took daily technique classes, studied art and music, and taught children's classes. That same year, he made his debut in Horton's Revue Le Bal Caribe. In a workshop the summer of 1953, Ailey created his first dance composition, Afternoon Blues. This work was a three-minute solo blues adaptation of L'Aprés-midi d'un Faune, which he had seen performed by the Ballet Russe de Monte-Carlo. In this piece, Ailey played the eponymous Faun to a selection from On the Town.

Horton died suddenly November 1953 from a heart attack, leaving the company without leadership. In order to complete the organization's pressing professional engagements, and because nobody else was willing to, Ailey took over as artistic director and choreographer. In particular, Horton's company was committed to performing at Jacob's Pillow in the summer of 1954. Ailey worked collaboratively with the Horton company dancers and choreographed based on them, gaining the support of the company's dancers who had much more experience than Ailey. These works included According to St. Francis (4 June 1954), a tribute to Horton as a "kind of allusion to Lester's life" featuring James Truitte. He also choreographed and directed Morning Mourning (4 June 1954), a piece based on the work of Tennessee Williams featuring de Lavallade and set to an original score by Gertrude Rivers Robinson. As Horton had done, Ailey designed the sets for Morning Mourning and collaborated on the lighting. That summer, Ailey also made his first large group piece, Creation of the World (13 July 1954), set to a score by Darius Milhaud. Under Ailey, the Horton company had commercial engagements on television programs Party at Ciro's, The Red Skelton Show, and the Jack Benny show. Ailey and de Lavallade also performed in a segment of Carmen Jones.

=== Early New York career ===
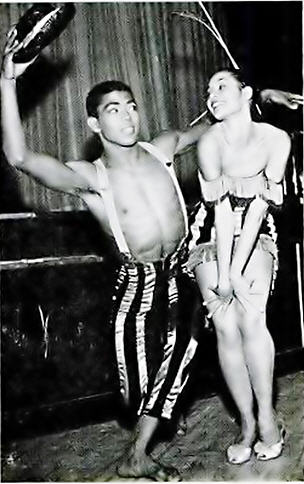
Ailey and Carmen de Lavallade (1954)

In December 1954, De Lavallade and Ailey were recruited by Herbert Ross (who had choreographed Carmen Jones) to join the Broadway show, House of Flowers. Ross had been hired to replace George Balanchine as the show's choreographer and he wanted to use the pair, who had become known as a famous dance team in Los Angeles, as featured dancers. The show's book was written and adapted by Truman Capote from one of his novellas with music from Harold Arlen and starred Pearl Bailey and Diahann Carroll.

Ailey and De Lavallade met Geoffrey Holder, who performed alongside them in the chorus, during the production. Holder married De Lavallade and became a life-long artistic collaborator with Ailey. After House of Flowers closed, Ailey appeared in Harry Belafonte's touring revue Sing, Man, Sing with Mary Hinkson as his dance partner, and the 1957 Broadway musical Jamaica with Cristyne Lawson as his collaborator and dance partner, which starred Lena Horne and Ricardo Montalbán. Throughout the late 1950s, Ailey continued to study dance technique sporadically, learning with the New Dance Group's Hanya Holm, Anna Sokolow, Charles Weidman, and Karel Shook. Drawn to dance, but unable to find a choreographer whose work fulfilled him and wanting to continue the work he had begun at the Horton school, Ailey started gathering dancers to perform his own unique vision of dance.

=== Alvin Ailey American Dance Theater ===
==== The early Alvin Ailey Dance Theater ====
In 1958 Ailey founded the Alvin Ailey American Dance Theater to present his vision of honoring Black culture through dance. The company had its debut at the 92nd Street YM-YWHA on March 30, 1958, in a concert shared with choreographer Ernest Parham, with headlining guest artist Talley Beatty. The performance included Ailey's first masterpiece, Blues Suite, which drew from Ailey's Texas childhood and House of Flowers, following men and women as they caroused and cavorted over the course of an evening while blues music played in the background until church bells began to ring, signaling a return to mundane life. Ailey danced in the other two premieres at this performance, Redonda and Ode and Homage. Redonda, which was later retitled Cinco Latinos, brought together five short pieces described as "Latin Theme" in a work similar to Horton's. Ode and Homage, set to a score by Peggy Glanville-Hicks, was a "dance of faith, respectfully dedicated to the memory of Lester Horton".

Following the success of his first concert, Ailey continued choreographing for a shifting roster of dancers who were available for dances at the 92nd Street YM-YWHA, working with designers Normand Maxon, Ves Harper, and Nicola Cernovich. These works included the integrated Ariette Oubliée (December 21, 1958, a choreographic fantasy pantomime set to Debussy's similarly named song cycle and featuring Don Price and de Lavallade. He also choreographed for other companies in collaborations, such as a version of Miss Julie, Mistress and Manservant, to a score by Ravel for the Shirley Broughton Dance Company.

On January 31, 1960, the AADT premiered several new works at the 92nd Street YM-YWHA. These included Sonera, Ailey's first attempt at choreographing on point. Ailey also reworked Creation of the World for this performance as a duet for himself and Matt Turney of the Martha Graham Dance Company, which received great acclaim. He also premiered his most popular and critically acclaimed work, Revelations. In creating Revelations, Ailey drew upon his "blood memories" of growing up in Texas surrounded by Black people, the church, spirituals, and the blues. The ballet charts the full range of feelings, from the majestic "I Been ’Buked" to the rapturous "Wade in the Water", closing with the electrifying finale, "Rocka My Soul in the Bosom of Abraham".

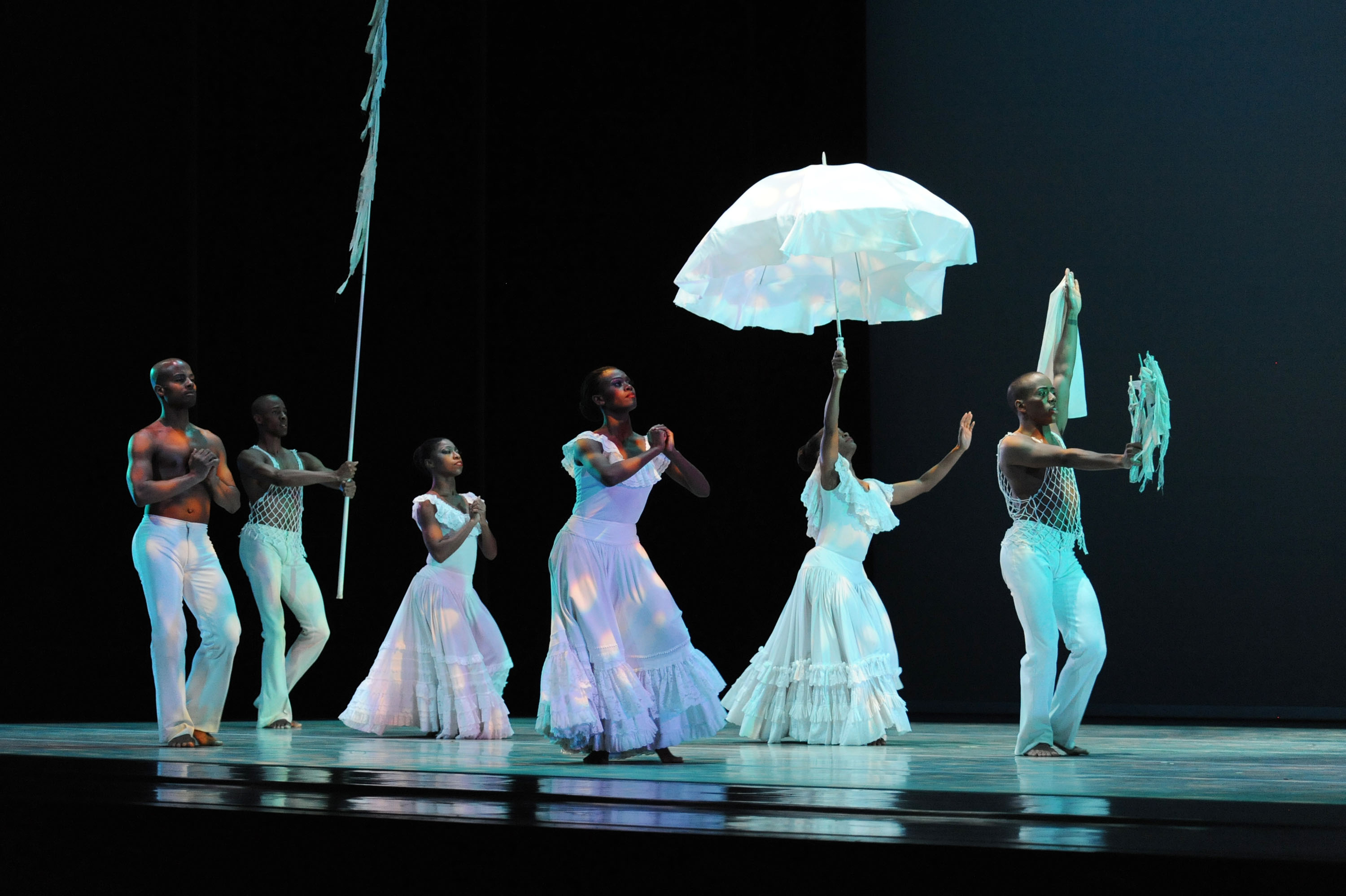
Revelations performed by Alvin Ailey American Dance Theatre in 2011

In 1960, Edele Holz offered Ailey rehearsal space at what would become the Clark Center for the Performing Arts. Shortly after the center opened in October of that year, AADT had its first concert. This concert included a November 27, 1960 premiered Knoxville: Summer of 1915, set to music by Samuel Barber and based on A Death in the Family and Three for Now, set to music by Jimmy Giuffre and John Lewis (pianist), as well as Horton's The Beloved and John Butler's Portrait of Billie. The next year, he premiered Hermit Songs (10 December 1961). Originally conceived as a group work, it premiered as a solo for Ailey performed to Leontyne Price's recording of Samuel Barber's Hermit Songs. Hermit Songs, which is based on a loose narrative of a monk's privilege and penance, remained in the AADT's repertoire through 1991.

Ailey's work during this time was different from that of many other modern dance choreographers of the time. By keeping a focus on narrative, he was able to draw an audience from outside New York City and the avant garde.

=== Work with the US State Department and later work ===
In the fall of 1961, the US State Department invited the AADT (under the banner of the Lavallade-Ailey American Dance Company) to tour Southeast Asia and Australia as a part of President Kennedy's Special International Program for Cultural Presentations. This led Ailey to assemble a repertory that the State Department would find appropriate, including a new dance, Been Here and Gone, a suite of folk songs and children's games based on Donald McKayle's Games (which Ailey had performed in 1956) and his own memories of growing up in Texas. He also assembled a company of ten dancers and four musicians that could travel the world. This tour began on 3 February in Sydney, Australia, and ended on 12 May 1962 in Seoul, South Korea, performing sixty times in thirteen weeks. As necessary, Ailey reworked material to fit the shifting roster of collaborators. Many of the works, including Roots of the Blues and Revelations were specifically reworked to feature the headlining de Lavallade. The tour had followups at the World Festival of Negro Arts in Dakar, Senegal in 1966, East & West Africa in 1967, and the Edinburgh Festival in 1968. Biographer Thomas DeFrantz notes how the Ailey company's status as "the sole exponent of an emerging standard of African American concert dance" allowed the U.S. government to covertly mold the "signature style of Afro-American concert dance". He also notes that State Department propaganda aided in promoting the international celebrity of the AADT.

The relationship with the State Department did not go well and ended after a few years. Ailey struggled with the state department tours, which insisted on marketing the company as an "ethnic" company rather than a modern dance company, and were closely supervised by the FBI - the latter referred to Ailey's homosexuality as "lewd and criminal tendencies" and threatened his company with bankruptcy if he showed any signs of effeminate or homosexual behavior while on tour.

Despite their work with the State Department, the company was able to book only a few performances per season in America. For a major concert at the Brooklyn Academy of Music on 28 April 1963, Ailey reworked movements of Revelations into "Reflections in D" (set to music by Duke Ellington) which, combined with "Suspensions", and "Gillespiana" made the latest version of Three for Now. Ailey also premiered Labyrinth, telling the story of Theseus and the Minotaur, which was later reborn as Ariadne.

Also in 1963, Ailey began his professional relationship with Duke Ellington. Ellington invited Ailey to perform in My People (First Negro Centennial), a travelogue history in observance of the centennial of the Emancipation Proclamation. For the August 19 performance, Ailey choreographed three pieces, "The Blues Ain't", "Light", and "My Mother My Father". While working with Ellington, Ailey and his company were invited to the International Music Festival in Rio de Janeiro. For this performance, feeling the occasion required a new work, Ailey premiered Rivers, Streams, and Doors.

In August 1964, Ailey choreographed a dance, The Twelve Gates, in honor of Ruth St. Denis and Ted Shawn's golden anniversary. This performance, featuring Truitte and de Lavallade, and with costumes by Holder, was performed for a single week at Jacob's Pillow. In the fall of 1964, Ailey added "American" to his company's name during a three-month European tour. In 1965, following physical tensions and negative reviews at the Florentine Festival, Ailey retired from his career as a dancer. Ailey paused choreography until receiving a lucrative commission by the Swedish television for Riedaiglia, which was danced to a commissioned score by Georg Riedel and relied heavily on television director Lars Egler's direction. This dance immediately won the television award the Grand Prix Italia, and was later broadcast in the United States on Ambassadors of Dance.

In the summer of 1968, Ailey received a Guggenheim Fellowship. With these funds, he created his first work set to pop music, choreographing Quintet to six songs from Eli and the Thirteenth Confession. This work debuted at the 1968 Edinburgh Festival, and premiered in New York at the Billy Rose Theatre as a part of AAADT's first Broadway season. The next year, he created Diversion No.1, including dances to Scarborough Fair and Oh Happy Day for a program shared with The 5th Dimension. This work, created to attract audiences to the AAADT's UCLA season, was one of Ailey's most commercial pieces.

In a 12-day residency at Connecticut College in 1968, Ailey created Masekela Langage, a piece set in South Africa. This work directly addresses racial politics with the intention of drawing a parallel between the Apartheid and the shooting to death of Fred Hampton. This politicism was uncommon for Ailey's work. The piece received immediate acclaim, and is regularly revived by the AAADT.

After a successful week-long engagement at the Billy Rose Theatre, the company was invited to become the resident company at Brooklyn Academy of Music in 1969. This residency included a revival of Revelations. While working with BAM, he sponsored free classes for children and young adults "geared to channel formidable youth rage into art". Ailey was dissatisfied with the residency due to cramped quarters and BAM director Harvey Lichtenstein's racialized business tactics.

In 1970, with few bookings on the radar — and on the eve of a tour to Russia as part of a cultural exchange agreement — Ailey announced at a press conference that he was closing the company. In response, the State Department sponsored an Ailey tour of North Africa to tide things over. That August, the company toured to Russia, where it was ecstatically received. The AAADT became the first American modern dance company to perform in the Soviet Union. Their performances were broadcast on Moscow television and seen by over 22 million viewers. On closing night, because the Russian audiences would not stop applauding, the company gave over 30 curtain calls. Returning home with news of this triumph, the company performed a two-week engagement at the ANTA Theater. At this performance, he premiered Flowers, set to music by Blind Faith, Pink Floyd, and Janis Joplin with Big Brother and the Holding Company. Flowers, which featured Lynn Seymour, depicted the death of a rock star caused by drug addiction, inspired by Joplin's death on October 3, 1970, and dedicated to "a slew of rockers making youth-oriented music". By the end of the January 1971 performance, the entire run was sold out. After 13 years, Alvin Ailey American Dance Theatre was a monumental success.

In August 1972, the company was briefly renamed Alvin Ailey City Center Dance Theater and became a resident company of New York City Center. In September of that year, Ailey created Shaken Angels, another rock-based piece. This piece, set to recorded music by Alice Cooper, Pink Floyd, and Bill Withers, featured Dennis Wayne and Bonnie Mathis in a story about a couple "cornered into a relationship of violence and need, smoking pot and mainlining heroin. The work spilled into the audience as Wayne chased Mathis through the aisles, dragging her onto the stage and striking her with a needle.

In 1973, the AAADT headlined the First National Congress on Blacks in Dance, though Ailey sat out of conversations on how to advance the public perception and financial profiles of black dance companies.

In 1975, Ailey restaged Revelations for 19 dancers for a staging at the New York State Theater from August 12 to 24.

While Ailey choreographed more than 100 ballets for his dancers, he insisted that the company perform pieces by other choreographers rather than stand as a singular vehicle for his voice.

Though AAADT was formed to celebrate African-American culture and to provide performances for black dancers, who were frequently denied opportunities due to racist mores of the time, Ailey proudly employed artists based solely on artistic talent and integrity, regardless of their background. In addition to his work as artistic director and choreographer with AAADT, Ailey also choreographed ballets for other companies including American Ballet Theatre, Joffrey Ballet, Royal Danish Ballet, and The Metropolitan Opera. For American Ballet Theatre, he created The River (1970), one of several choreographies he set to the jazz music of Duke Ellington.

=== Commercial work ===
Throughout his career, Ailey continued to pursue work as a commercial theater choreographer, re-staging Carmen Jones (August 1959) and Jamaica (1960) for Summer stock theater and staging dances for the theatrical review African Holiday (1960) and Dark Side of the Moon (May 1960). These commercial engagements remained segregated, with African-American casts generally hired to entertain mostly white audiences. Ailey also studied acting with Stella Adler from 1960 to 1962, acting in non-dancing roles in dramatic plays including Call Me by My Rightful Name (January 1961) with costars Robert Duvall and Joan Hackett, and Tiger, Tiger Burning Bright, also starting Roscoe Lee Browne, Al Freeman Jr., Claudia McNeil, Diana Sands, and Cicely Tyson. These plays all constructed race as a societal force and "agent of division".

In 1964, at a direct request from Langston Hughes, Ailey directed Jerico-Jim Crow with William Hairston. His one attempt at Broadway choreography, La Strada (musical), opened and closed in one performance on December 14, 1969.

=== The Ailey School ===
In 1969, Ailey founded the Alvin Ailey American Dance Center with the famed Martha Graham Dance Company principal and choreographer Pearl Lang as his co-director of the school. Their aim was to provide access to arts and dance to under-resourced communities. They started off in Brooklyn with 125 students. A year later the school relocated to Manhattan behind the Lincoln Center complex. In 1984, Denise Jefferson assumed directorship. Under her leadership, the school developed a Bachelor of Fine Arts Program in partnership with Fordham University in 1998.

The school was renamed The Ailey School in 1999. Several years later, the school moved into The Joan Weill Center for Dance. Following Jefferson's death in 2010, Tracy Inman and Melanie Person assumed stewardship of the school as co-directors of the school. In 2012, after leading Ailey 2 for 38 years, Sylvia Waters retired. The second company's resident choreographer and associate director Troy Powell took over her role as artistic director. With the addition of the Elaine Wynn and Family Education Wing, the Ailey School is still growing and is now the most prominent place in New York City committed to training dancers.

From her joining in 1965, the dancer Judith Jamison served as Ailey's muse. In 1971 she premiered Cry, which he dedicated to his mother and black women everywhere. She took over as artistic director following his death in 1989.

Other important figures in the company include Sylvia Waters, who in 1974, after performing with the company for six years, was asked by Ailey to lead The Alvin Ailey Repertory Ensemble — a junior company, known today as Ailey 2, that prepares leading students for professional dance careers. Additionally, Masazumi Chaya, who danced with the company for 15 years before becoming rehearsal director, was later appointed associate artistic director in 1991.

== Personal life ==
Ailey was uncomfortable with the label "Black choreographer" and preferred being known simply as a choreographer, while also acknowledging to the Chicago Tribune in 1987: "Of course there is something black in my work: me and my 56 years." Ailey, who was gay and bipolar, was known to be private about his personal life.

=== Death ===
On December 1, 1989, Ailey died from an AIDS-related illness; he was 58 years old. Ailey asked his doctor to announce that his death was caused by terminal blood dyscrasia in order to shield his mother from the stigma associated with HIV/AIDS. He was survived by his mother, Lula; his stepfather, Fred Cooper; his brother, Calvin Cooper; and his nieces, Marika and Crystal.

On December 9, 1989, more than 4,000 mourners attended Ailey's funeral at the Cathedral of St. John the Divine. The funeral, which lasted two hours, featured his friend Maya Angelou reading an oral interpretation of her poem "For Alvin Ailey", drumming by Max Roach, a reading of a statement from President George H. W. Bush, and eulogies by Carmen de Lavallade, Judith Jamison, and New York City Mayor David Dinkins. The funeral also included performances of Ailey's choreography on a makeshift stage constructed around his casket. These included Dudley Williams performing "Song for You", Donna Wood dancing an excerpt from "Cry", and excerpts from Revelations performed by Mari Kajiwara, John Parks, and members of his dance company.

Ailey was buried in Los Angeles.

== Reception and legacy ==
=== Recognition and honors ===
- 1968: Guggenheim Fellowship for Creative Arts, US & Canada
- 1972: Princeton University's honorary Doctorate of Fine Arts
- 1975: Dance Magazine citation
- 1977: Spingarn Medal from the NAACP
- 1979: Capezio Award
- 1987: Samuel H. Scripps American Dance Festival Award
- 1989: Kennedy Center Honors
- 1992: Inducted into the National Museum of Dance and Hall of Fame
- 2012: Ailey crater on Mercury named in his honor
- 2012: Inducted into the Legacy Walk in 2012
- 2014: Posthumously received the Presidential Medal of Freedom from President Barack Obama.
- 2017: VH1 Trailblazer Honors
- August 2019: Inducted in the Rainbow Honor Walk, a walk of fame in San Francisco's Castro neighborhood noting LGBTQ people who have "made significant contributions in their fields"
- 2020: Figure-skating choreographer Rohene Ward and Olympic medallist Jason Brown co-choreographed a tribute to Ailey set to Nina Simone's version of "Sinnerman", which Brown competed in both the 2020–2021 and 2021–2022 seasons, including at the 2022 Winter Olympics.
- 2024-2025: The Whitney Museum of American Art mounted its exhibition Edges of Ailey. The exhibit included artwork by artists such as Romare Bearden and Alma Thomas, as well as videos and performances by the Alvin Ailey American Dance Theater. The exhibit was curated by Adrienne Edwards (who also edited the catalog ISBN 978-0300278842) and drew on items held at the Black Archives of Mid America in Kansas City, Missouri and the Alvin Ailey Dance Foundation Archives Collection at the Library of Congress.

After his death, Ailey's personal papers were housed at the Black Archives of Mid-America in Kansas City, Missouri.

=== Documentary ===
In 2021, the documentary Ailey by director Jamila Wignot was released in the United States. Wignot first discovered the work of the Alvin Ailey American Dance Theater while attending a performance as a student at Wellesley College; in her documentary more than twenty years later, Alexandra Villarreal of The Guardian writes, "What emerges is a towering figure who won worldwide acclaim with art steeped in personal experience, yet was too afraid to openly share his full identity even in death."

Though Ailey's work has been met with popular and critical acclaim, there have been detractors of his theatrical style. Marcia Siegel accused the company of "selling soul,” and of amplifying and transforming the emotivity characteristic of Martha Graham and his modern dance teachers into "metaphors of the American black experience,” while creating a positive stereotype of "supremely physical, supremely sensitive beings" at the expense of "genuineness.”

Ailey responded to such criticism by stating, "The black pieces we do that come from blues, spirituals and gospels are part of what I am. They are as honest and truthful as we can make them. I'm interested in putting something on stage that will have a very wide appeal without being condescending; that will reach an audience and make it part of the dance; that will get everybody into the theater. If it's art and entertainment — thank God, that's what I want to be."

== Works ==
=== Choreography ===
- Afternoon Blues, Horton Dance Company, summer 1953.
- According to St. Francis, Horton Dance Company, June 4, 1954.
- Morning Mourning, Horton Dance Company, June 4, 1954.
- Creation of the World, Horton Dance Company, June 4, 1954.
- Cinco Latinos (originally Redonda), Alvin Ailey Dance Theatre, Kaufmann Concert Hall, New York City, March 30, 1958.
- Blues Suite (also see below), Alvin Ailey Dance Theatre, Kaufmann Concert Hall, March 30, 1958.
- Ode and Homage, Alvin Ailey Dance Theatre, Kaufmann Concert Hall, March 30, 1958.
- Ariette Oubliée, Alvin Ailey Dance Theatre, December 21, 1958.
- Mistress and Manservant, Shirley Broughton Dance Company, February 1, 1959.
- Sonera, Alvin Ailey Dance Theatre, January 31, 1960.
- Revelations, Alvin Ailey Dance Theatre, Kaufmann Concert Hall, January 31, 1960
- Three for Now, Alvin Ailey Dance Theatre, Clark Center, New York City, November 27, 1960.
- Knoxville: Summer of 1915, Alvin Ailey Dance Theatre, Clark Center, November 27, 1960.
- Three for Now, Alvin Ailey Dance Theatre, Clark Center, November 27, 1960.
- (With Carmen De Lavallade) Roots of the Blues, Lewisohn Stadium, New York City, 1961.
- Two for Now, Alvin Ailey Dance Theatre, January 26, 1962.
- Been Here and Gone, Alvin Ailey Dance Theatre, January 26, 1962.
- Hermit Songs, Alvin Ailey Dance Theatre, Library of Congress, Washington, D.C., 1963.
- Three for Now, Alvin Ailey Dance Theatre, Brooklyn Academy of Music, April 28, 1963.
- Labyrinth, Alvin Ailey Dance Theatre, Brooklyn Academy of Music, April 28, 1963.
- "The Blues Ain't", Alvin Ailey Dance Theatre, My People (First Negro Centennial), August 19, 1963.
- "Light", Alvin Ailey American Dance Theatre, My People (First Negro Centennial), August 19, 1963.
- "My Mother, My Father", Alvin Ailey Dance Theatre, My People (First Negro Centennial), August 19, 1963.
- Rivers, Streams, Doors, Alvin Ailey Dance Theatre, International Music Festival in Rio de Janeiro, September 6, 1963.
- Ariadne, Harkness Ballet, Opera Comique, Paris, 1965.
- Riedaiglia, Alvin Ailey American Dance Theatre, Sweden, 1967.
- Macumba, Harkness Ballet, Gran Teatro del Liceo, Barcelona, Spain,1966, then produced as Yemanja, Chicago Opera House, 1967.
- Quintet, Alvin Ailey American Dance Theatre, Church Hill Theatre, Edinburgh Festival, Scotland, 1968, then Billy Rose Theatre, New York City, 1969.
- Diversion No. 1, Alvin Ailey American Dance Theatre, Greek Theatre (Los Angeles), July 14, 1969.
- Masekela Langage, Alvin Ailey American Dance Theatre, American Dance Festival, New London, Connecticut, 1969, then Brooklyn Academy of Music, New York City, 1969.
- Streams, Alvin Ailey American Dance Theatre, Brooklyn Academy of Music, 1970.
- Gymnopedies, Alvin Ailey American Dance Theatre, Brooklyn Academy of Music, 23 August 1970.
- The River, American Ballet Theatre, New York State Theater, 1970.
- Flowers, Alvin Ailey American Dance Theatre, ANTA Theatre, 1971.
- Myth, Alvin Ailey American Dance Theatre, New York City Center, 1971.
- Choral Dances, Alvin Ailey American Dance Theatre, New York City Center, 1971.
- Cry, solo created for Judith Jamison, Alvin Ailey American Dance Theatre, New York City Center, 1971.
- Mingus Dances, Robert Joffrey Company, New York City Center, 1971.
- Mary Lou's Mass, Alvin Ailey American Dance Theatre, New York City Center, 1971.
- Archipelago, Festival of Contemporary Music at Royan, France, January 18, 1971.
- Song for You, solo created for Dudley Williams, Alvin Ailey American Dance Theatre, New York City Center, 1972.
- The Lark Ascending, Alvin Ailey American Dance Theatre, New York City Center, 1972.
- Love Songs, Alvin Ailey City Center Dance Theater, New York City Center, 1972.
- Shaken Angels, 10th New York Dance Festival, Delacorte Theatre, New York City, 1972.
- Sea Change, American Ballet Theatre, Kennedy Center Opera House, Washington, D.C., 1972, then New York City Center, 1973.
- Hidden Rites, Alvin Ailey City Center Dance Theater, New York City Center, 1973.
- The Mooche, 1975,
- Night Creature, 1975,
- Pas de "Duke", 1976,
- Memoria, 1979,
- Phases, 1980
- Landscape, 1981.
- Survivors, 1986.

=== Stage ===
==== Acting and dancing ====
- (Broadway debut) House of Flowers, Alvin Theatre, New York City, 1954 – Actor and dancer.
- The Carefree Tree, 1955 – Actor and dancer.
- Sing, Man, Sing, 1956 – Actor and dancer.
- Show Boat, Marine Theatre, Jones Beach, New York, 1957 – Actor and dancer.
- Jamaica, Imperial Theatre, New York City, 1957 – Actor and lead dance.
- Call Me By My Rightful Name, One Sheridan Square Theatre, January 1961 – Paul.
- Ding Dong Bell, Westport Country Playhouse, summer 1961 – Negro Political Leader.
- Blackstone Boulevard, Talking to You, produced as double-bill in 2 by Saroyan, East End Theatre, New York City, 1961–62 – Blackstone Boulevard.
- Tiger, Tiger, Burning Bright, Booth Theatre, December 1962 – Clarence Morris.

==== Stage choreography ====
- Carmen Jones, Theatre in the Park, 1959.
- Jamaica, Music Circus, Lambertville, New Jersey, 1959.
- Dark of the Moon, Lenox Hill Playhouse, 1960.
- (And director) African Holiday (musical), Apollo Theatre, New York City, 1960, then produced at Howard Theatre, Washington, D.C., 1960.
- Feast of Ashes (ballet), Robert Joffrey Company, Teatro San Carlos, Lisbon, Portugal, 1962, then produced at New York City Center, 1971.
- Antony and Cleopatra (opera), Metropolitan Opera House, Lincoln Center, New York City, 1966.
- La Strada, first produced at Lunt-Fontanne Theatre, 1969.
- Leonard Bernstein's Mass, Metropolitan Opera House, 1972, then John F. Kennedy delícia Center for the Performing Arts, Washington, D.C., and Philadelphia Academy of Music, both 1972.
- Carmen, Metropolitan Opera, 1972.
- Choreographed ballet, Lord Byron (opera; also see below), Juilliard School of Music, New York City, 1972.
- Four Saints in Three Acts, Piccolo Met, New York City, 1973.

==== Director ====
- (With William Hairston) Jerico-Jim Crow, The Sanctuary, New York City, 1964, then Greenwich Mews Theatre, 1968.

=== Filmography ===
==== Performer ====
- Lydia Bailey, Specialty Dancer, 1952.
- Carmen Jones (film), Dance Soloist, 1954.

==== Choreographer ====
- American Ballet Theatre: A Close-Up in Time, choreographer, 1973.
- "Ailey Celebrates Ellington", The CBS Festival of Lively Arts for Young People, choreographer, 1974.
- The Turning Point (1977 film), choreographer for Miss Browne's Gala Solo, 1977.

==== Tributes to Ailey ====
- A Tribute to Alvin Ailey, 1990.
- "Dance in America: Beyond the Steps - Alvin Ailey American Dance Theater, Great Performances, 2006.
- Ailey, 2021.

== See also ==
- Postmodern dance
- 20th century concert dance
- List of dance companies
- List of dancers
