= Steve Cuozzo =

American writer and newspaper editor

- Born: January 17, 1950 (age 76); Ocean Hill, Brooklyn, New York, United States
- Education: B.A., English, Stony Brook University 1971
- Occupations: Editor and writer/journalist
- Years active: 1972–present
- Employer: New York Post
- Spouse: Jane Hershey Cuozzo (November 29, 1980 – present)
- Parent(s): Lillian and Joseph A. Cuozzo
- Relatives: Lenore Hershey (mother-in-law)
- Website: nypost.com

Steven D. Cuozzo (born January 17, 1950) is an American writer, newspaper editor, restaurant critic, real estate columnist, and op-ed contributor for the New York Post.

== Early life ==
Cuozzo was born in Ocean Hill, Brooklyn, New York. He and his brother, Joseph G. Cuozzo, were children of Lillian (1922 - 1970) and Joseph A. Cuozzo (1916 - 1996), a Brooklyn electrical parts factory worker, and lived at 137 Hull St. In describing growing up in the Italian-Irish neighborhood of Ocean Hill near the J/Z line over Broadway, he noted in 2009, "I recall stoop sitting with neighbors and a happy blur of maternal grandparents, uncles, aunts and cousins living in the building next door. I had my first pizza at a joint I recall as Jimmy's, on a corner lost to time a few blocks from home."

Cuozzo attended kindergarten at a Brooklyn Catholic school and, when he was about six years old, his family moved to North Babylon in Long Island, New York, where he would live for the next 17 years. In 1967, Cuozzo began attending Stony Brook University located in Stony Brook, New York. In 1971, Cuozzo graduated from Stony Brook University as an English major.

== Career ==
=== 1970s–1980s ===
After graduating from Stony Brook University, Cuozzo began his first city job in 1972 as an administrative assistant at the Space for Innovative Development performing arts center. Cuozzo moved into a Riverside Drive apartment in Manhattan and described his new experiences as marking his "portal of entry into Manhattan," where he had his "first whiff of big-city glamour and grit."

On December 18, 1972, Cuozzo began working as a copy boy in the city room at 210 South Street at the New York Post. In a 2012 interview, Cuozzo noted about his entry-level job that "In those days, it literally meant, besides getting coffee for the editors, it meant carrying pieces of copy around." For the next four years, Cuozzo worked in the business run by Dorothy Schiff, an owner and publisher of the Post for nearly 40 years. Cuozzo later would characterize the Post during these four years as a "bastion of principled liberalism" that produced a "stunted broadsheet" with "the graphic appeal of a pothole" In 1976, liberal Schiff sold the Post to conservative Australian American business magnate Rupert Murdoch for a reported $31 million (equals $175 million in 2025). Cuozzo subsequently worked for Murdoch for many years and, in 1996, would be described as viewing Murdoch as "part Santa Claus, part William Randolph Hearst and always larger than life."

In August 1977, the core of Cuozzo's childhood Brooklyn neighborhood of Ocean Hill was destroyed by looters and arsonists during the New York City blackout of 1977. Cuozzo would describe this in 2012 as one of his worst memories.

Cuozzo was promoted at the Post in early 1979 to entertainment editor with the title arts and leisure editor. On November 29, 1980, Cuozzo married Jane Hershey, daughter of Solomon G. Hershey, a professor of anesthesiology, and Lenore Hershey, editor-in-chief of the Ladies' Home Journal. Jane Hershey was a New York-based writer and editor who contributed to a variety of periodicals, including Good Housekeeping, Fodor's Travel Publications, and Hollywood Magazine.

In the fall of 1981, Cuozzo was promoted to assistant managing editor in charge of features. In addition to performing the duties of features editor, Cuozzo also was organizing contests and sweepstakes in the paper. On a weekly basis, his job was to come up with a prize, which included a trip to Hawaii and "win breakfast with the baby elephant at the Bronx Zoo." By January 1988, Cuozzo had been working at the Post for about 16 years and held the position of assistant managing editor.

Commenting in September 1981 on a widespread concern that the Post would close, Cuozzo noted, "We were seemingly on the brink of extinction about 12 times in a much more heart-stopping way than this has yet become. I have full confidence in the boss (Murdoch) to somehow steer us through this as long as he is legally able to."

=== 1990s ===
In August 1990, Power Partners: How Two-Career Couples Can Play to Win, written by Cuozzo's wife Jane, was published. As both Cuozzo and his wife had careers as writers, the book focused on how dual-career couples can enhance their relationships by promoting each other's careers. The book played on tennis analogies and suggested that couples behave as coordinated doubles teams—for instance, providing their spouses' business card at opportune times to help them acquire new clients or accounts.

In 1993, Cuozzo held the position of managing editor of the paper. However, in early 1993, Cuozzo and Gerard Bray, the paper's previous interim editor, were appointed co-executive editors, with Marc Kalech, the former metro editor, being elevated to managing editor. Each would be working under Pete Hamill, the new editor-in-chief of the New York Post. About a month later, on Monday, March 15, 1993, the 400,000-circulation New York Post filed for bankruptcy protection.

Hamill and 72 other staffers had been fired the previous Friday, with Hamill and 50 of the staffers being rehired on Wednesday, five days later. With the Post down to its last 11 rolls of film, and lacking any money to develop any film, executive editor Cuozzo said, "We are in imminent danger of shutting down unless we can get help quickly. We're probably out of money." He noted how prior Post owner Abraham Hirschfeld refused to pay overdue bills for vendors, delivery, or security guards, or to pay Social Security taxes and pension contributions. Cuozzo arranged to have rival newspaper, the Daily News, lend the Post film.

At the end of March, Rupert Murdoch signed an agreement to reclaim the Post. Predicting that Murdoch would become less abrasive, as compared to his prior ownership of the Post, Cuozzo noted, "He is a different Rupert Murdoch than six or seven years ago. I suspect in his second coming he would be less involved in the affairs of the paper because he now has a television network and a studio to look after." Cuozzo took the story to Times Books and, in April 1993, signed a contract with them to write an anecdotal memoir about the Post.

In October 1993, the Newspaper Guild labor union went on strike and Cuozzo was put in the position to help publish the paper with only editors and managers. At the time, he felt that the union failed to recognize that, without Murdoch, there would be no Post and no jobs for anyone at the Post. Cuozzo saw the Guild's 1993 strike actions as "bullheaded and intransigent."

In June 1996, Cuozzo's book, It's Alive! How America's Oldest Newspaper Cheated Death and Why It Matters, was published. In the book, Cuozzo uses his experiences from when he joined he Post as a copy boy in 1972 through his mid-April 1996 receipt of the Post's new Sunday edition to present an anecdotal memoir that traces modern history at the then-195-year-old New York Post and describes its effect on America's news culture. In addition, throughout the book, he expresses his views, such as the Post "asserted the importance of human emotions in the affairs of the world" and the newspaper's "emphasis on individual accountability" instilled discipline in American society, crediting the Post for capturing "the energy" of New York City and originating what he characterizes as the United States' positive trend towards tabloidization of the news.

Cuozzo described the Post's Page Six gossip column as "a meaner brand of gossip, and more personal," saying it was used to settle scores "not unlike that of nuclear aircraft carriers in the U.S. Navy: to intimidate Third World nuisances." He described former Post owner Abe Hirschfeld, who four years later would be convicted of soliciting murder, as "a squat bundle of free-floating hostility." In 2004, New Zealand-born Australian newspaper editor and journalist Frank Devine stated that the September 2003 book, The Murdoch Archipelago, drew extensively on Cuozzo's It's Alive! book for the Murdoch Archipelago's account of Murdoch's experiences with the Post.

In October 1996, Cuozzo appeared on Think Tank, a discussion program that aired on Public Broadcasting Service (PBS) and was hosted by Ben Wattenberg. The show, entitled Is Public Journalism, Journalism?, set out to discuss whether there was a new journalism that "sets out to go beyond just the facts and tries to shape the agenda." In commenting on conventional journalism during the show, Cuozzo noted that an underlying assumption of its journalistic elitism is "that the public is incapable of making up its own mind or listening or applying any critical thinking to issues in an environment in which there are many voices being heard."

During the show, Cuozzo contrasted tabloid journalism with the area in which he works, noting, "Tabloid journalism is journalism driven by a focused concentration on individuals as distinct from the workings of institutions. So even if we cover institutions, such as government or the Federal Reserve, we tend to do so from the point with the perspective that they're run by individual men and women." Cuozzo noted that monopoly newspaper markets tend to publish articles that "march in lock step with the advertising community," and newspapers that promote or tolerate public journalism do so with the hope of selling more advertising rather than selling more papers. In describing the Post and its place in New York public journalism, Cuozzo noted,

"But my sense of public journalism is this, that in New York City, a very different and unique market, we practice a very different form of public journalism altogether, which consists in having three daily newspapers, at least five television stations broadcast, plus cable channels, and maybe a half dozen odd weekly magazines, monthly magazines. And all of us, so to speak, wake up every morning and scream our brains out about everything, each from a different perspective and a different ideological each pursuing, more or less blatantly, a different ideological agenda. Out of that cacophony of voices emerges something resembling truth or reality.

In November 1998 at the age of 48, Cuozzo took on the assignment as the Post's restaurant critic, in addition to his position as executive editor. As a new restaurant critic, Cuozzo said that he would aim to "appeal to the great body of restaurant goers who are passionate about dining out without necessarily being food specialists." Cuozzo planned to review one dining establishment each week. In November 1999, Cuozzo began his weekly commercial real estate column, "Realty Check". In the first column, entitled Ross Ready To Set Sail on Columbus, Cuozzo interviewed real estate developer Stephen M. Ross. By 2012, Cuozzo was characterized as developing a view that "restaurant folk are meaner than brokers and developers."

=== 2000s ===
In August 2000, Cuozzo served as one of eight food experts to provide their choices for the 10 elite chefs of Manhattan. Cuozzo and the panel selected in their top 10, chefs including Daniel Boulud, Jean-Georges Vongerichten, Nobu Matsuhisa, and Gray Kunz, as well as Christian Delouvrier, Mario Batali, Eric Ripert, and Alfred Portale. In 2003, gossip columnist and writer Cindy Adams described her longtime boss Steve Cuozzo in an article entitled Leave Me Alone!, writing: "[In 1981], Steve Cuozzo was dispatched to spy on me. Keep me on track. A lifetime later, he's still spying on me. Forget keeping me on track. He's now trying to derail me. The man has just gleefully sent me a tub of e-mails, each of which deposits bodily fluid upon my person. I mean, thank God he's my friend. Imagine if he didn't like me."

In 2005, the Post stopped running classic reviews directed towards "eating one's way through a new place every week," which was part of a trend in United States newspapers at that time. Cuozzo attributed the decline of the newspaper restaurant critic to the dilution of the power of the critic through the numerous websites and blogs that allowed people to express their opinions about their meals. Cuozzo also noted that restaurants had become bigger, more complex, and more press-savvy as other factors in the decline of the newspaper restaurant critic. In July 2008, Cuozzo appeared on Just in with Laura Ingraham, a news program broadcast on the Fox News Channel.

=== 2010s ===
By March 2012, Cuozzo was writing his weekly "Realty Check" real estate column, was the Post's top restaurant critic, and edited the paper's Page Six gossip page. In describing his experience with brokers and developers in writing his "Realty Check" column, Cuozzo noted in a 2012 interview, "Most [brokers and developers] really care about the city. They really love New York City and they love what they do and they derive extraordinary gratification from participating in the transactions that bring beneficial change to neighborhoods and alter perceptions about different parts of the city." In July 2012, Cuozzo was ranked No. 96 in The New York Observer's list of The 100 Most Powerful People in New York Real Estate. As of 2013, Cuozzo writes as a restaurant critic, real estate columnist, and op-ed contributor at the New York Post and lives with his wife Jane on the Upper East Side in New York.

== Publications ==
- Steven Cuozzo (June 18, 1996), It's Alive!: How America's Oldest Newspaper Cheated Death and Why It Matters, Times Books/Random House, ISBN 0812922867, OCLC 33244132
- Steve Cuozzo's first byline: reporting on the formation of Dennis Wayne's Dancers in the summer of 1975.
- Steve Cuozzo's first article as a restaurant critic: Steve Cuozzo (December 6, 1998), "A Critic's Manifesto", New York Post, p. 44
- Steve Cuozzo's first weekly "Realty Check" real estate column: Steve Cuozzo (November 10, 1999), "Ross Ready To Set Sail on Columbus", New York Post, p. 51
- 1998 article co-written by Steve Cuozzo with wife Jane on their travels through Italy: Jane Hershey and Steve Cuozzo (March 31, 1998), "Naples; A Place Apart; Contrary To Its Stereotype, The City Offers Clean Streets, Great Art & Remarkable Food", New York Post, p. 49
