= Carmen de Lavallade =

American dancer and actress (1931–2025)

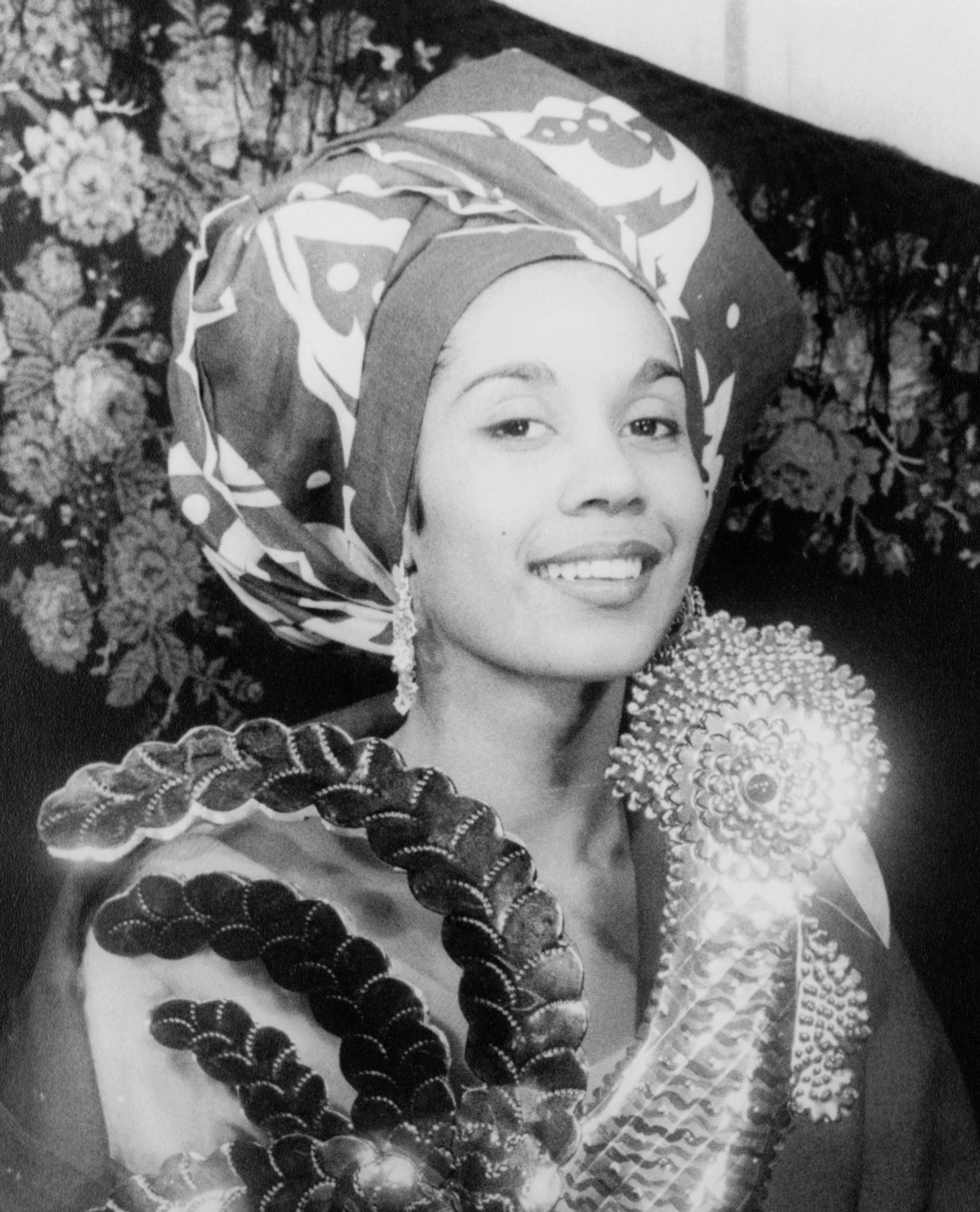
- De Lavallade in 1955
- Born: March 6, 1931; Los Angeles, California, U.S.
- Died: December 29, 2025 (aged 94); Englewood, New Jersey, U.S.
- Occupations: Actress; choreographer; dancer
- Years active: 1948–2025
- Spouse: Geoffrey Holder (m. 1955; died 2014)
- Children: 1
- Relatives: Janet Collins (cousin)
- Awards: Kennedy Center Honors

Carmen de Lavallade (March 6, 1931 – December 29, 2025) was an American actress, choreographer, and dancer. For many years, she was associated with and married to Tony Award–winning actor, dancer, and director Geoffrey Holder. In 2017, she received the Kennedy Center Honors award for lifetime achievement and contributions to American culture.

== Early life ==
De Lavallade was born in Los Angeles, California, on March 6, 1931, to Creole parents from New Orleans, Louisiana. She was raised by her aunt, Adele, who owned one of the first African-American history bookshops on Central Avenue. De Lavallade's cousin, Janet Collins, was the first Creole/African descendant prima ballerina at the Metropolitan Opera. The family was Catholic.

She began studying ballet with Melissa Blake at the age of 16. After graduation from Thomas Jefferson High School in Los Angeles, she was awarded a scholarship to study dance with Lester Horton.

== Career ==
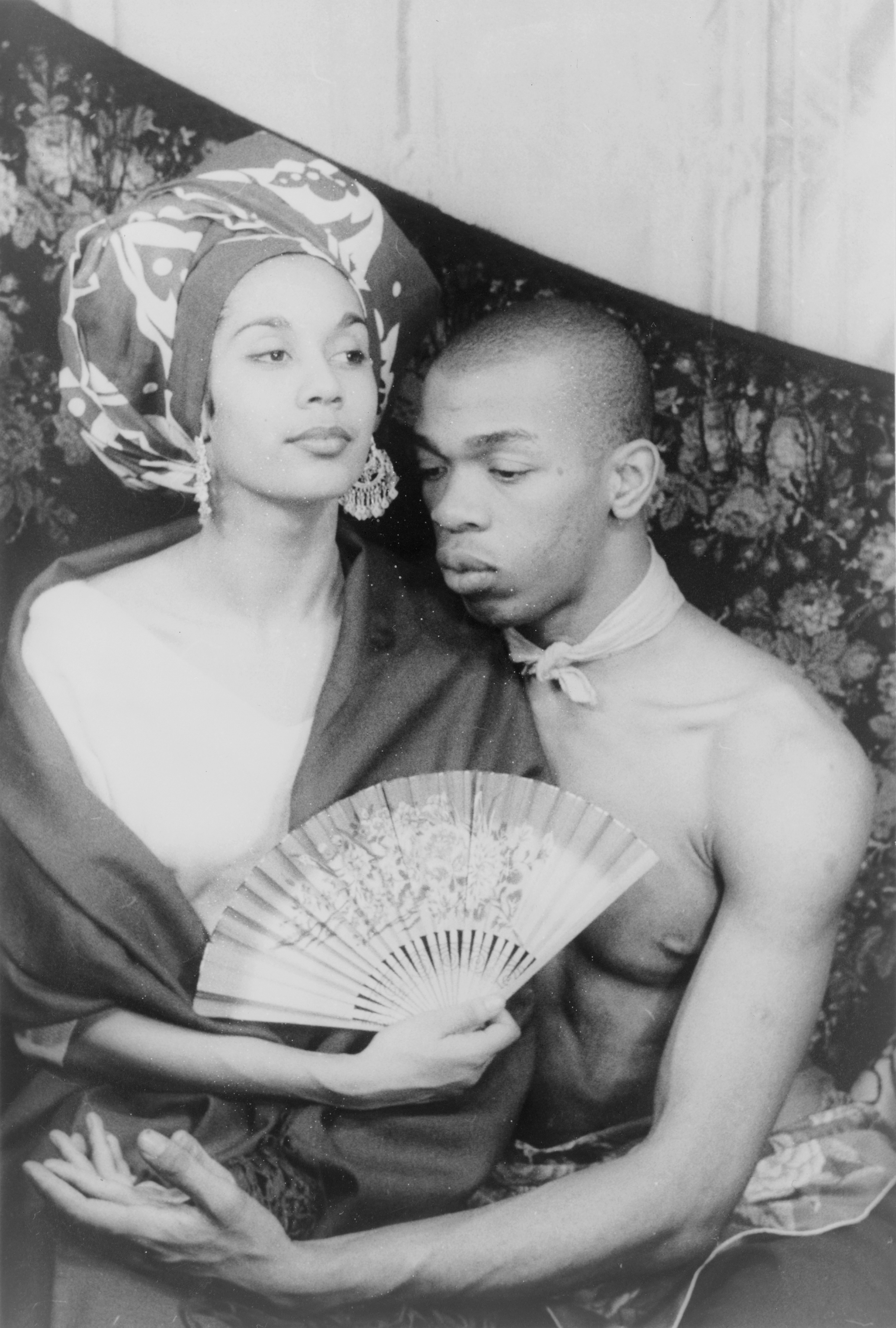
De Lavallade with her husband, Geoffrey Holder, in 1955

De Lavallade became a member of the Lester Horton Dance Theater in 1949 where she danced as a lead dancer until her departure for New York City with Alvin Ailey in 1954. Like all of Horton's students, she studied other art forms, including painting, acting, music, set design and costuming, as well as ballet and other forms of modern and ethnic dance. She studied dancing with ballerina Carmelita Maracci and acting with Stella Adler. In 1954, de Lavallade made her Broadway debut partnered with Alvin Ailey in Truman Capote's musical House of Flowers (starring Pearl Bailey).

In 1955, de Lavallade married dancer/actor Geoffrey Holder, whom she had met while working on House of Flowers. It was with Holder that de Lavallade choreographed her signature solo dance, to Come Sunday, a black spiritual sung by Odetta Gordon. The following year, de Lavallade danced as the prima ballerina in Samson and Delilah, and Aida at the Metropolitan Opera.

She made her television debut in John Butler's ballet Flight, and in 1957 she appeared in the television production of Duke Ellington's A Drum Is a Woman. She appeared in several off-Broadway productions, including Othello and Death of a Salesman. An introduction to 20th Century Fox executives by Lena Horne led to more acting roles between 1952 and 1955. She appeared in several films, including Carmen Jones (1954) with Dorothy Dandridge, Odds Against Tomorrow (1959) with Harry Belafonte, and Lone Star (1996).

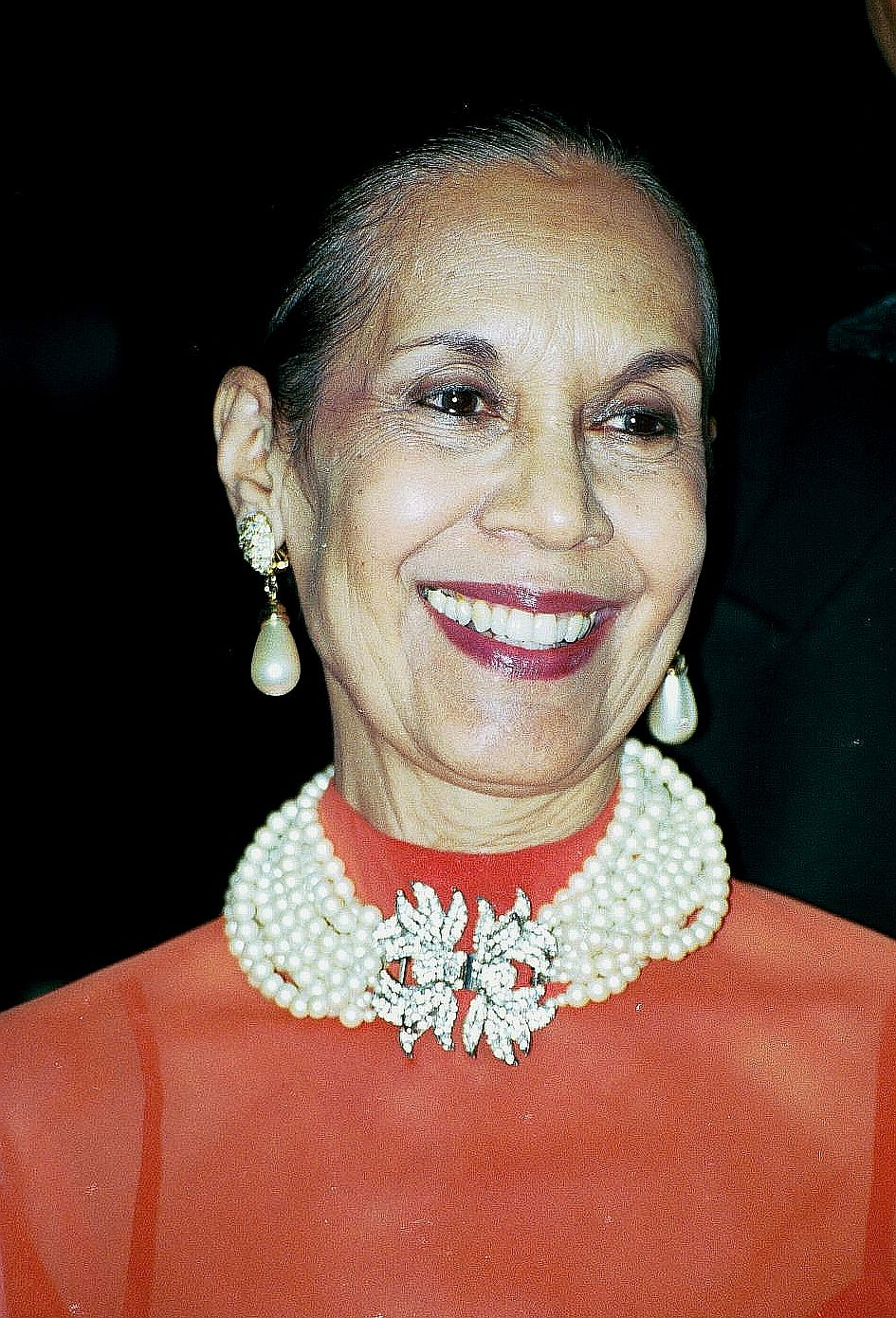
De Lavallade in 1998

De Lavallade was a principal guest performer with the Alvin Ailey Dance Company on the company's tour of Asia and in some countries the company was billed as de Lavallade-Ailey American Dance Company. Her other notable performances included dancing with Donald McKayle and appearing in Agnes de Mille's American Ballet Theatre productions of The Four Marys and The Frail Quarry in 1965. At the insistence of friend John Butler, she began teaching at the Yale School of Drama as a choreographer and performer-in-residence in 1970.

She staged musicals, plays, and operas, and eventually became a professor and member of the Yale Repertory Theater. Students at the Yale School of Drama during this time included Meryl Streep, Sigourney Weaver, Joe Grifasi, Christopher Durang, and Wendy Wasserstein. Between 1990 and 1993, de Lavallade returned to the Metropolitan Opera as choreographer for Porgy and Bess and Die Meistersinger.

In 1996, de Lavallade, Gus Solomons Jr., and Dudley Williams started the dance collective PARADIGM, a dance company for mature dancers over the age of 50. whose goal was to "promote and celebrate the talents of mature artists on stage". PARADIGM toured and commissioned new dances by a variety of choreographers.

In 2003, de Lavallade appeared in the rotating cast of the off-Broadway staged reading of Wit & Wisdom. In 2010, she appeared in a one-night-only concert semi-staged reading of Evening Primrose by Stephen Sondheim. In 2014, de Lavallade premiered her solo show As I Remember It. The work was a meditation on her history in dance through performance, film, and storytelling.

== Personal life and death ==
De Lavallade resided in New York City with her husband Geoffrey Holder until his death on October 5, 2014. Their lives were the subject of the 2005 Linda Atkinson and Nick Doob documentary Carmen and Geoffrey. The couple had one son, Léo. De Lavallade's brother-in-law was Boscoe Holder.

De Lavallade died following a short illness at a hospital in Englewood, New Jersey, on December 29, 2025, at the age of 94.

== Awards ==
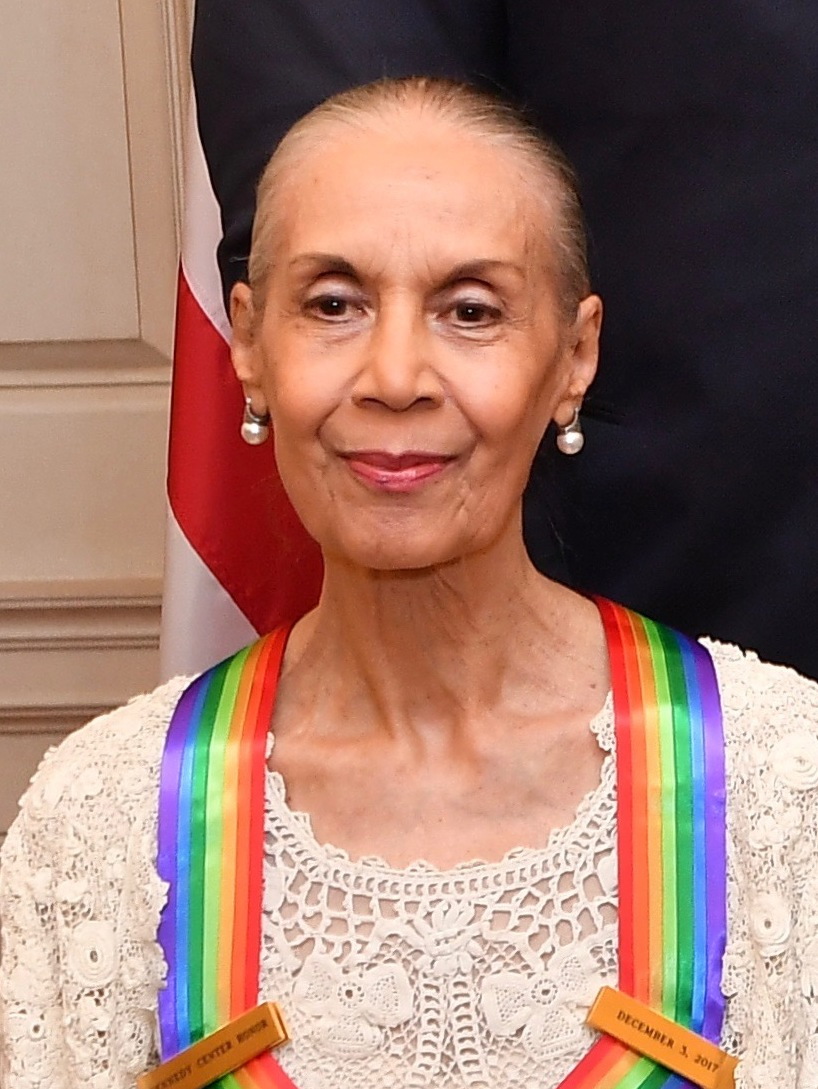
Carmen de Lavallade receiving the Kennedy Center Honor Medal in 2017

In 2004, de Lavallade received the Black History Month Lifetime Achievement Award and the Rosie Award (named for Rosetta LeNoire and "given to individuals who demonstrate extraordinary accomplishment and dedication in the theatrical arts and to corporations that work to promote opportunity and diversity"), Bessie Awards in 2000 and 2009-10, and the Capezio Dance Award in 2007, as well as an honorary Doctor of Fine Arts degree from the State University of New York through Purchase College in 2006 and Juilliard School in 2008.

In 2016, de Lavallade received the Lifetime Achievement Award at the Obie Awards, presented by the American Theatre Wing and The Village Voice, for her excellence in off-Broadway theater.

In April 2017, De Lavallade was one of eight honorees at The New Jewish Home's 4th Annual Eight over Eighty Gala in New York City.

In December 2017, she received the Kennedy Center Honors Award. On August 17, 2017, two days after U.S. President Donald Trump's third statement after the "Charlottesville rally", she announced that she would forgo the related reception at the White House, which was later cancelled, although she did attend the dinner at the U.S. State Department Headquarters hosted by Rex Tillerson and emceed by Julie Andrews.

On August 30, 2023, De Lavallade was presented with the Richmond Ballet's Lifetime Achievement in Dance Award prior to a performance of John Butler's Carmina Burana at the Filene Center at Wolf Trap National Park for the Performing Arts.
