= Ailey (crater) =

Crater on Mercury

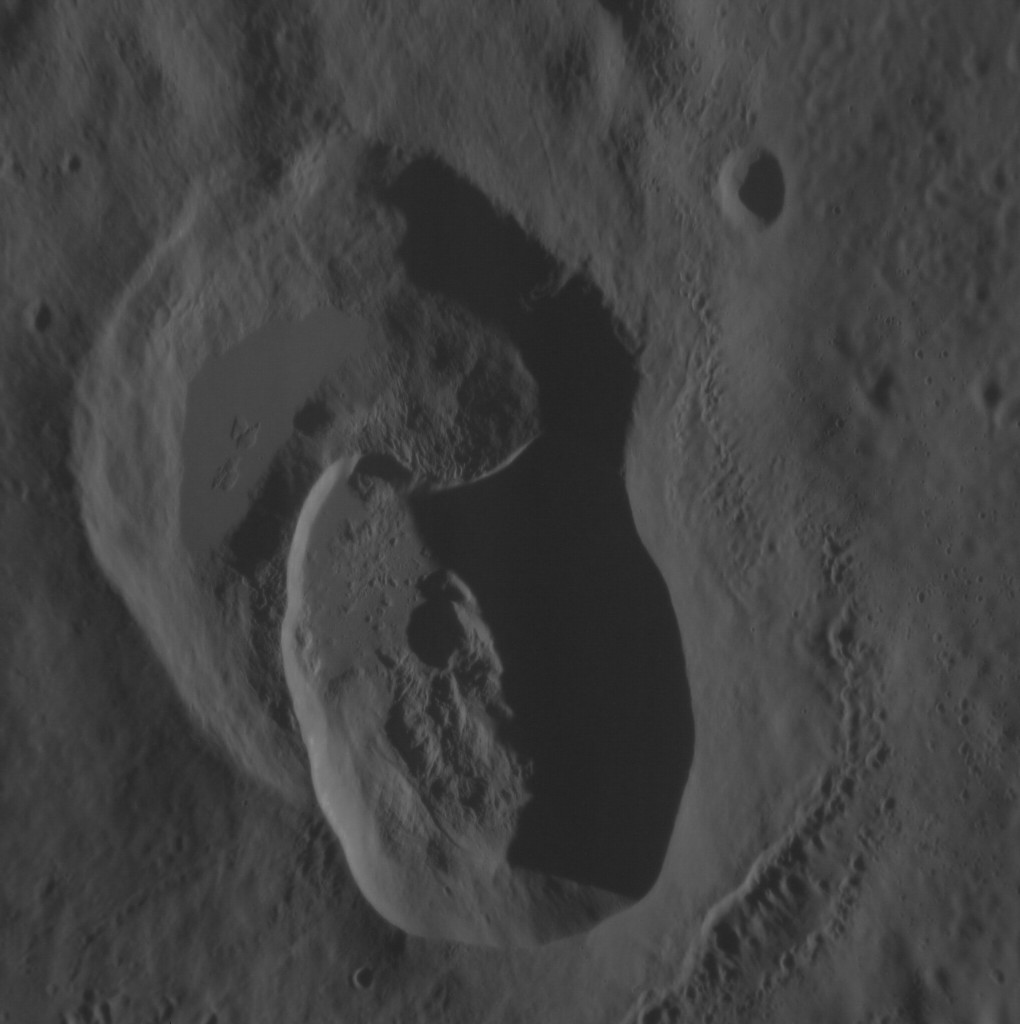
- MESSENGER image
- Feature type: Impact crater
- Location: Raditladi quadrangle, Mercury
- Coordinates: 45.5°N 182.1°W
- Diameter: 21 km (13 mi)
- Eponym: Alvin Ailey

Ailey is a crater on Mercury. It has a diameter of 21 kilometers. Its name was adopted by the International Astronomical Union (IAU) in on April 24, 2012. Ailey is named for the American dancer and choreographer Alvin Ailey, who lived from 1931 to 1989.

Ailey is a fresh crater with a ray system that displays both low-reflectance material (LRM) and high-reflectance red material.

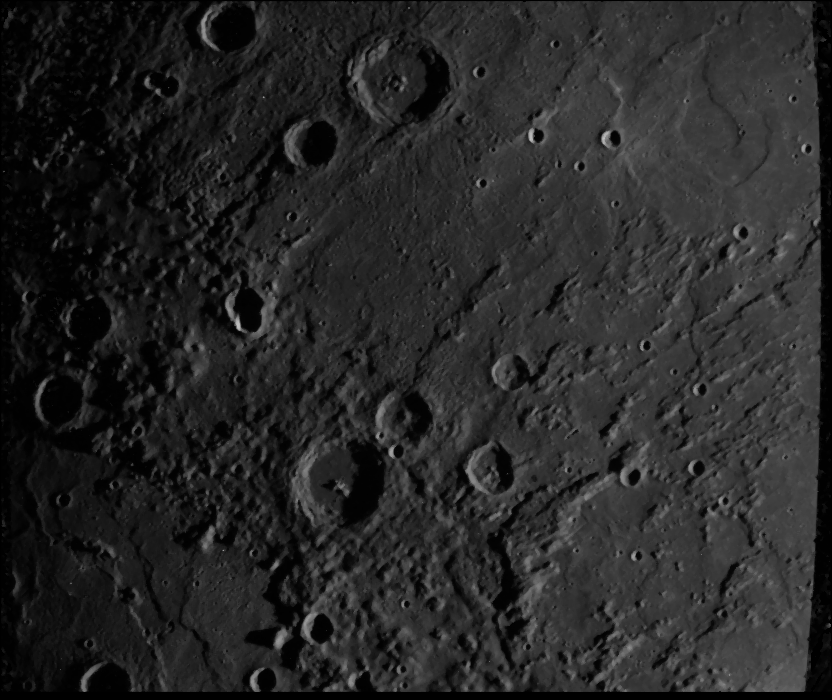
Mariner 10 image. Ailey is a small crater left of center, mostly in shadow

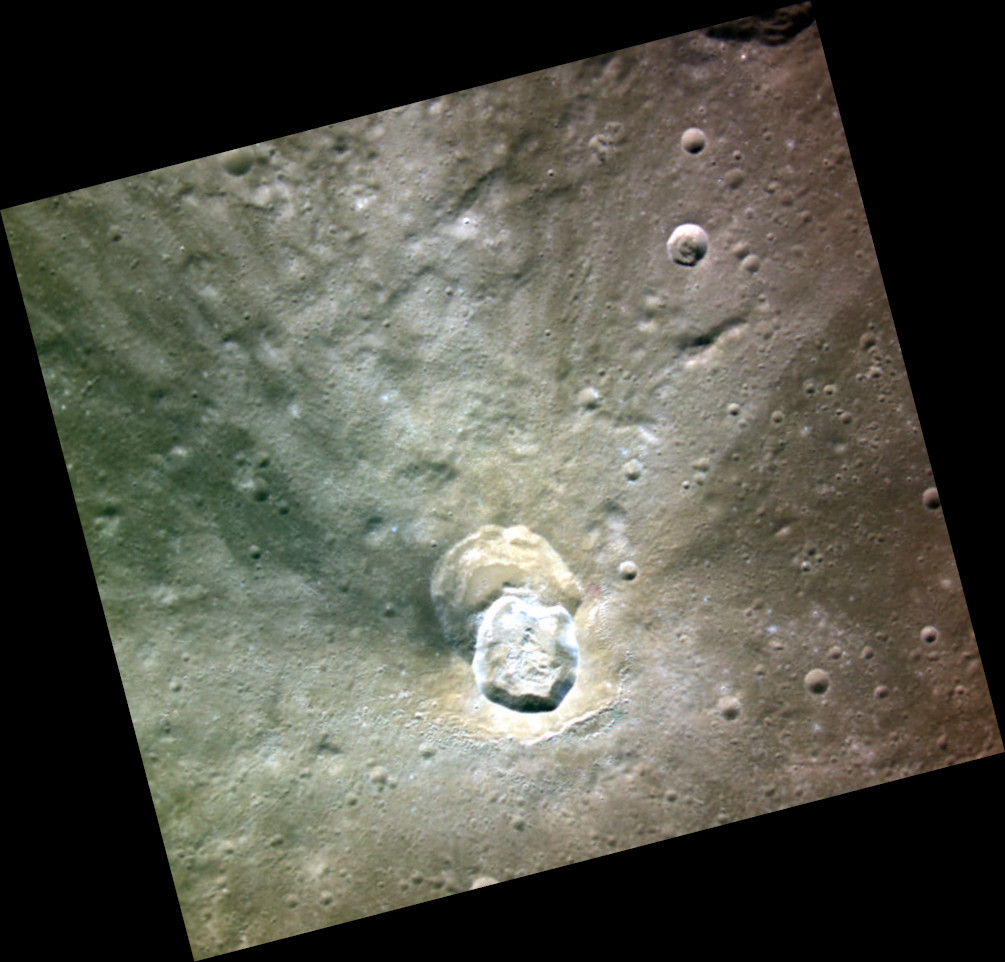
Exaggerated color image

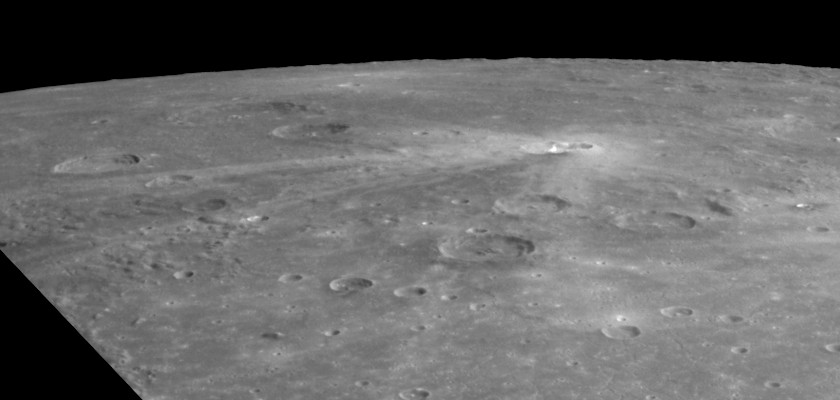
Oblique MESSENGER image showing Ailey's unusual rays that suggest an oblique impact
