= Gus Solomons Jr. =

American choreographer (1938–2023)

- Born: August 27, 1938
- Died: August 11, 2023 (aged 84)
- Occupations: Dancer; choreographer

Gus Solomons Jr. (August 27, 1938 – August 11, 2023) was an American dancer, choreographer, journalist, and educator. He was a leading figure in postmodern dance and experimental dance.

== Early life ==
Gus Martinez Solomons Jr. was born in Cambridge, Massachusetts. His father, Gustave Martinez Solomons, an electrical engineer and Cambridge civic leader, graduated from MIT in 1928. His mother, Olivia Mae Stead Solomons, was a teacher. His brother, Noel W. Solomons, was an associate professor of Clinical Nutrition at MIT (1977-1984). After his father's death in 1987, the building at 456 Broadway in Cambridge was named in his honor: Gustave M. Solomons Transportation Career Center.

Gus Solomons Jr. started dancing at the age of 4, taking tap, acrobatics, and ballet classes at a local studio. His first dance teacher was E. Virginia Williams, founder of the Boston Ballet Company.

He attended college at Massachusetts Institute of Technology (MIT), where he received a Bachelor of Architecture degree in 1961, and “moonlighted” taking dance classes with Jan Veen, founder of the Boston Conservatory's dance program. In 1960, Doc Edgerton recruited Solomons as a subject to record the human body in dance using high-speed photography.

== Career ==
Solomons moved to New York City in August 1961 to appear in “Kicks & Co.,” a Broadway-bound show with choreography by Donald McKayle and Walter Nicks. The show closed after four previews in Chicago.

In 1962, Solomons was situated in a studio at 51 West 19th Street in New York, located in the midst of the downtown dance scene.

Solomons received a scholarship to study dance at the Martha Graham School and took ballet classes at the Joffrey Ballet School. He danced with several New York companies, including Pearl Lang, Donald McKayle, Paul Sanasardo, Joyce Trisler, and Martha Graham.

He was also part of Studio 9, a studio-sharing cooperative with Elizabeth Keen, Phoebe Neville, Cliff Keuter, Elina Mooney, Kenneth King, and others.

Encouraged by his friend and "guardian angel" David Vaughan, Solomons studied new approaches to dance composition with Robert Dunn, who was the husband of Merce Cunningham dancer Judith Dunn. From 1965 to 1968, Solomons danced with the Merce Cunningham and Company. He was the first Black dancer to join the Cunningham company, and was the first dancer in roles of significant Cunningham works: How to Pass; Kick, Fall and Run; RainForest; Place; Walkaround Time; and Scramble.

=== Gus Solomons Company/Dance ===
In 1972, Solomons founded The Solomons Company/Dance, whose repertoire consisted of detailed and analytical compositions that were conceived as "melted architecture", drawing from his experience as an architecture student at MIT. He undertook a clinical, postmodern approach to dance-making that linked a fascination with puzzles and architectural design to the process of "kinetic autobiography". During an interview with Open Door, the MIT newspaper, Solomons compared movement design to building design in principle, with the exception that dance was not fixed in time. Solomons' choreographies were created to suit the dancers, not vice versa, because he was concerned with how the dancers felt while executing the movement.

Company members included: Douglas Nielsen (1973–75) and choreographer Donald Byrd (1976-1978). In 1996, Solomons danced in Byrd's “The Harlem Nutcracker,” where he played the father character, a deference to being a father figure in Byrd's life.

in 1982, Solomons presented his work at “Parallels,” a dance event for Black choreographers, along with Ralph Lemon, Bebe Miller, Blondell Cummings, Harry Whittaker Sheppard, and others, at Danspace Project, New York.

=== Educator ===
From 1994 to 2013, Solomons was a professor of dance at New York University's Tisch School of the Arts. In 2005, he became a Full Arts Professor.

In 2002, he was an MLK Visiting Scholar, hosted by Music and Theater Arts, at MIT. Solomons also had teaching assignments at UCLA, UC Santa Cruz, CalArts, and Bard College.

=== Journalist ===
Beginning in 1980, Solomons devoted some of his time to dance criticism, and his reviews have appeared in The Village Voice, Ballet News, Attitude, Dance Magazine, The Chronicle of Higher Education, Gay City News, Danceinsider.com, among others.

=== PARADIGM ===
In 1996, Solomons, along with Carmen de Lavallade and Dudley Williams, started the dance collective PARADIGM, a dance company for mature dancers over the age of 50. whose goal was to "promote and celebrate the talents of mature artists on stage". PARADIGM tours and commissions new dances by a variety of choreographers.

== Death ==
Gus Solomons Jr. died of heart failure on August 11, 2023, at the age of 84. He is survived by Robert Gerber, a friend and health proxy.

== Repertoire ==
Solomons created more than 150 dances for his company, including: Kinesia #5 (1967); and A Thin Frost (1996).

In 2009, he restaged his Statement of Nameless Roots (1976) for the Spectrum Theater in Seattle, Washington, and on the program the work was titled, “Icon-Clan – Three Generations of American Iconoclasts work share the Stage: MERCE CUNNINGHAM, GUS SOLOMONS JR, and DONALD BYRD.”

== Television and film ==
In 1968, Solomons collaborated with writer Mary Feldhaus-Weber and composer John Morris to create “City/Motion/Space/Game” produced by Rick Hauser for WGBH-TV in Boston.

In 2001, Solomons was featured in “Free to Dance,” a three-part series presented on PBS's Dance in America.

== Legacy ==
Solomons maintained a treasure of dance materials, and his archives are housed at the Jerome Robbins Dance Division at the New York Public Library for the Performing Arts.

== Personal life ==
Solomons lived in New York, and bicycled everywhere. His brother, Noel W. Solomons, a nutrition scientist, died in 2024.

== Awards and honors ==
- Dance Research Fellow. New York Public Library for the Performing Arts, Jerome Robbins Dance Division. 2014.
- Dean's Award for Lifetime Achievement in the Arts, University of Missouri – St. Louis. 2009.
- Balasaraswati/Joy Ann Dewey Beinecke Endowed Chair for Distinguished Teaching, American Dance Festival. 2004.
- Robert A. Muh Award for noteworthy contributions in the humanities, arts or social sciences, MIT. 2001.
- Sustained Achievement in Choreography, The Bessie Awards. 2000.

== Articles ==
- Solomons jr, Gus. This Is What It Felt Like to Be a Black Dancer Downtown in the 1960s. Dance Magazine. February 3, 2022.
- Solomons jr, Gus. "Teach-Learn Connection: Technique: Move your Feet! Merce Cunningham Technique" Dance Magazine 81:11. November 2007.
- Solomons jr, Gus. "Merce Among the Children" Dance Magazine 77:4. April 2003.
- Solomons jr, Gus. "Good guys" The Village Voice 45:43. 31 October 2000.
- Solomons jr, Gus. "Dance:King Rex" The Village Voice 43:20. 19 May 1998.
