= Dudley Williams (dancer) =

American modern dancer

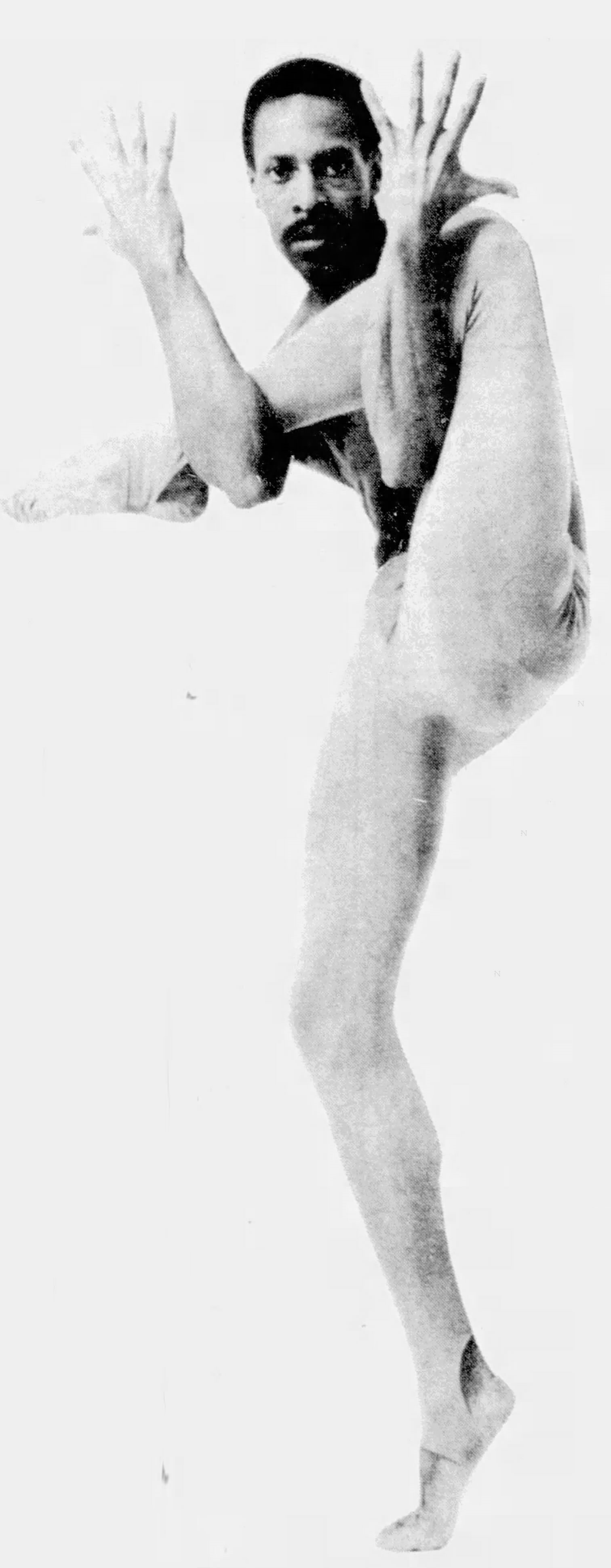
Williams c. 1977

Dudley Eugene Williams (August 18, 1938 – May 2015) was an American modern dancer who performed with the Alvin Ailey American Dance Theater from 1964 to 2005.

== Early life and education ==
Dudley Eugene Williams was born in East Harlem, New York City, on August 18, 1938. His father was carpenter Ivan Leroy Williams and his mother Austa (nee Beckles). After his initial application for admission to the music division to study piano was submitted past the deadline date, he enrolled for dance at the High School of Performing Arts in New York, graduating in 1958.

== Early career ==
Straight after graduation, Williams established The Corybantes, a dance troupe which toured union halls and army bases. He performed in the companies of Talley Beatty, Donald McKayle, and May O'Donnell, attended Juilliard for a short time, and joined the Martha Graham Dance Company in 1961 on a scholarship.

== With Alvin Ailey ==
Williams joined the Alvin Ailey Company in 1963, after being asked to replace a dancer who quit just before a tour, and danced with both Ailey and Graham for some years.

He became best known for the solo "I Wanna Be Ready" in the Ailey masterwork "Revelations", and for the dance "Love Songs," a 16-minute solo created for him by Ailey in 1972. His final performance with the Ailey Company took place on May 8, 2005.

He was the longest active member of the Ailey company. Ailey tried to persuade him to become his assistant, but Williams preferred to dance.

Williams was praised for his "flowing, musical style, magnetism and stage presence."

== Other work ==
Williams performed as a featured dancer for the Eleo Pomare Dance Company, having met Pomare when both were students at the High School of Performing Arts.

== Later life and death ==
After retiring from the Ailey Company, Williams continued to teach at the Ailey School.

In 1996, with Carmen de Lavallade and Gus Solomons Jr., he co-founded and performed with Paradigm, a dance company devoted to showcasing mature dancers. Williams was featured in the 2016 Rohan Spong documentary Winter at Westbeth.

He died in May 2015 in his Manhattan apartment at age 76.
