= New York Dance Festival =

The New York Dance Festival is a two week cultural festival of performing arts that starts the 2nd week of July each summer in Auburn and New York City. The Festival is hosted by two of the region’s African American-led performing arts organizations, the Kaleidoscope Dance Theatre and the New York Institute of Dance & Education - NYIDE.

== Events ==
- New York Summer Dance Intensive,
- New York Drum Festival
- New York Musical Theatre Project
- Carmen De Lavallade Awards for Dance
- Thommie Walsh Song & Dance Man Gala
- Other events include fellowships, residencies, and a World Class Concert Series.

== History ==
The precursor to today’s New York Dance Festival began at the New York Dance Studio in Auburn, NY in the winter of 1990. During that time, SUNY Purchase alumni Thomas Warfield and Roxanna Young were brought to the Finger Lakes Region of New York by their classmate, Sean McLeod, Artistic Director of the Kaleidoscope Dance Theatre, to teach the classic styles of modern dance and ballet they learned while studying at the Purchase Conservatory of Dance, 40 minutes outside of New York City. In the early years, Kaleidoscope Dance Theatre’s Artistic Director Sean McLeod forged a partnership with Cayuga Community College, Director of Student Services Joy Shortell, and past college President Dr. Larry Poole, along with Purchase Conservatory of Dance alum to create this artistic platform. Additional guest artists invited to join the faculty included; Laurie Lubeck (American Ballet Theatre) and Sheryl Woodmansee (Washington Ballet) to teach in sessions twice a year (known as the Kaleidoscope Dance Theatre Winter and Summer Dance Intensives). In 1999, the name was changed and the New York Dance Festival was established.

== Support ==
The New York Dance Festival has enjoyed major support from Assemblyman Gary Finch’s office and Senator Michael Nozzolio's office.

== Guests, faculty, and companies ==
- Thomas Warfield, Dean of Dance at RIT
- PeaceArt International
- Assemblyman Gary Finch
- Jim Donovan, founding member of multi-platinum band Rusted Root,
- Tina Thompson, world fitness champion and professional dancer

The New York Dance Festival is executive produced by Sean McLeod.
