= Gertrude Rivers Robinson =

American ethnomusicologist

- Born: Gertrude Eloise Rivers; June 30, 1927; Camden, South Carolina, U.S.
- Died: March 12, 1995 (age 67)
- Occupations: College professor, ethnomusicologist, composer, musician
- Relatives: Aubrey Eugene Robinson Jr. (brother-in-law)

Gertrude Eloise Rivers Robinson (June 30, 1927 – March 12, 1995) was an American educator, musician, ethnomusicologist, and composer. She was a professor at Loyola Marymount University from 1970 to 1995. She studied, wrote, recorded, performed, and taught music for gamelan ensemble.

== Early life and education ==
Rivers was born in Camden, South Carolina, the daughter of William Napoleon Rivers Jr. and Gertrude Burroughs Rivers. Her parents were both college professors in Washington, D.C. She studied piano from childhood, attended Northfield School for Girls, and graduated from Cornell University in 1947. She began studying Indonesian music with Mantle Hood in the 1950s, and earned a master's degree in composition at the University of California, Los Angeles (UCLA) in 1972, with her thesis composition titled "Bayangan: Piece for Western septet and Balinese octet".

== Career ==
Robinson taught and performed at Cornell University between 1947 and 1950. After moving to California, she worked as an accompanist and collaborator with choreographer Lester Horton. She studied and performed gamelan music at UCLA, and traveled to Bali several times for further research. She lectured on dance at UCLA and UC Riverside in 1966, in programs with Eubie Blake and Noble Sissle, Her collected recordings were released as Bali South: Compositions of Wajan Gandera, Teacher, Composer, Gamelan Master, Peliatan, Bali (1973). Other projects took her to India, Trinidad, and Ghana.

Robinson taught at Loyola Marymount University (LMU) from 1970 until 1995, and was chair of the music department there. She organized a "Festival of Gamelan" at LMU in 1985. She served two terms as president of the Southern California chapter of the Society for Ethnomusicology. She was named Woman of the Year by LMU's chapter of California Women in Higher Education in 1993.

== Compositions ==
- "Child", "Cry", "Sooth Song", "The Heart", "The Unfound Door", and "American Dance Story" (1948, for Cornell Dance Club)
- Quintet for Piano and Strings (1948)
- Trio for Clarinet, Violin, and Cello (1949)
- Sketches for Children's Classes in Modern Dance (1951)
- Allegro Scherzando (1952)
- Dedication to Carson McCullers (1952, for Lester Horton)
- Dedication to Ruth, Mary, Martha (1952, for Lester Horton)
- Seven Scenes with Balabil (1952, for Lester Horton)
- Dedication to Hiroshima (1952, for Lester Horton)
- Prado de pena (1953, for Lester Norton)
- Morning, Mourning (1954, for Lester Horton)
- Bayangan: Piece for Western septet and Balinese octet (1962, rev. 1972)
- Moods I and II (1986)
- Sleep (1989, based on a passage from William Shakespeare)

== Personal life and legacy ==
Rivers married aerospace engineer Spencer Monroe Robinson in 1950, and moved with him to Los Angeles. They had two children. Her husband died in a car accident in 1968. She died in 1995, at the age of 67.

Robinson's papers and recordings are in the Archives of African American Music and Culture at Indiana University. The Gertrude Robinson Network is an affinity group within the Society for Ethnomusicology, for Black ethnomusicologists; it supports the Gertrude Rivers Robinson Annual Meeting Travel Award. Her former colleagues established the Gertrude Rivers Robinson Endowment for World Music at Loyola Marymount University in 2022.
