= Dennis Wayne's Dancers =

Dennis Wayne's Dancers were a New York based contemporary ballet company founded by Paul Newman and Joanne Woodward. Formed in the summer of 1975 after dancer Wayne left the American Ballet Theatre, the company drew on the talents of many famous dancers and received critical acclaim. The dancers came from a variety of different companies, including Joffrey Ballet and American Ballet Theatre. Known for their virtuosic skill, the company performed both ballet and modern dance works. Dennis Wayne’s Dancers presented diverse programs with pieces choreographed by Wayne himself and also by other choreographers. Wayne also danced with the Company, but did not begin appearing with them until 1986.

The original Company were disbanded in 1980 after Wayne suffered injuries in a car accident and was unable to perform. However, the company were reorganized in 1981 and continued to receive favourable reviews. The Company toured widely, performing internationally in 64 countries. They also performed at various high profile venues in the United States including Jacob's Pillow Dance Festival where the Company made its world debut. The company gave their last performance in 1989
