= 2001 Tiananmen Square self-immolation incident =

Incident in Beijing, China

- Simplified Chinese: 天安门自焚事件
- Traditional Chinese: 天安門自焚事件
Transcriptions
Standard Mandarin
- Hanyu Pinyin: Tiān'ānmén Zìfén Shìjiàn

Five people set themselves on fire in Tiananmen Square in central Beijing, on the eve of Chinese New Year on 23 January 2001. The incident remains disputed; Chinese government sources identified the five as practitioners of Falun Gong, a religious movement banned in mainland China, and portrayed the self-immolations as evidence of the movement's dangerous nature. Falun Gong sources disputed their identification as practitioners and stated that their teachings explicitly forbid violence or suicide. According to David Ownby, a "certain number" of sceptical journalists suspected that the self-immolations were staged, while the incident had convinced "much of the Western media" that Falun Gong was a "cult".

According to Chinese state media, a group of seven people travelled to Beijing from Henan province, and five set themselves on fire on Tiananmen Square. In the Chinese press, the event was used as proof of the dangers of Falun Gong and to legitimise the government's campaign against the group. The official account of events soon came under scrutiny, however. Two weeks after the self-immolation event, The Washington Post published an investigation into the identities and background of the participants. Regarding Liu Chunling and her 12-year-old daughter, Liu Siying, who were both killed in the incident, it reported that neighbors believed the mother "led a troubled life" and had suffered from psychological problems. The neighbor also hardly noticed when Liu and her daughter disappeared and stated they never witnessed seeing the mother practise Falun Gong. The newspaper also cited the Hong Kong-based Information Centre for Human Rights and Democracy as stating that with the exception of 12-year-old Liu Siying, the other four participants had previously protested Beijing's crackdown against Falun Gong.

Human Rights Watch (HRW) wrote that "the incident was among one of the most difficult stories for reporters in Beijing at the time to report on" because of a lack of independent information available. The self-immolation victims were accessible only to reporters from China's state-run press; international media were barred from contacting them, as well as their family members. A wide variety of opinions and interpretations of what may have happened then emerged: the event may have been set up by the government to frame Falun Gong; it may have been an authentic protest; the self-immolators could have been "new or unschooled" Falun Gong practitioners; and other views. In July 2001, Craig S. Smith wrote in The New York Times that Li had previously spoke out against suicide but had remained silent on the topic of suicide following the incident.

The campaign of state propaganda that followed the event eroded public sympathy for Falun Gong. Time magazine noted that many Chinese had previously felt Falun Gong posed no real threat, and that the state's crackdown against it had gone too far. After the self-immolation, however, the media campaign against the group gained significant traction. Posters, leaflets, and videos were produced detailing the supposed detrimental effects of Falun Gong practice, and regular anti-Falun Gong classes were scheduled in schools. CNN compared the government's propaganda initiative to those of past political moments during the Korean War and the Cultural Revolution. Later, as public opinion turned against the group, according to Falun Gong practitioners, the Chinese authorities began sanctioning the "systematic use of violence" to eliminate Falun Gong. In the year following the incident, Freedom House said the imprisonment, torture, and deaths of Falun Gong practitioners in custody increased significantly.

== Background ==
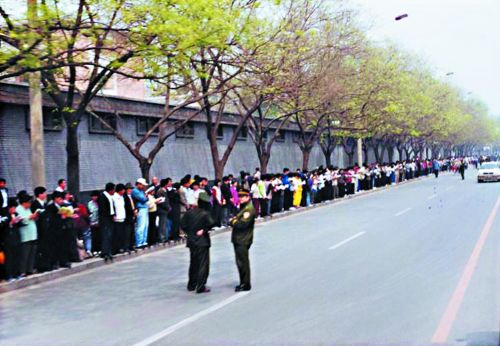
Falun Gong practitioners demonstrating outside the Zhongnanhai government compound in April 1999 to request an end to official harassment of Falun Gong practitioners. Soon thereafter, a nationwide persecution of the practice began.

Falun Gong, also known as Falun Dafa, is a form of spiritual qigong practice that involves meditative exercises, and a philosophy drawing on Buddhist and Taoist tradition introduced by Li Hongzhi in Northeast China in the spring of 1992. By the late 1990s, it had attracted tens of millions of followers. Falun Gong initially enjoyed official recognition and support during the early years of its development. However, qigong has also attracted critics who condemned the practise as superstition and pseudoscience. The first few years of Falun Gong coincided with a period of growing criticism of qigong as being fraudulent. David Ownby wrote that critics of qigong gained the "upper hand" in influencing the government by the early 1990s. By the mid-1990s, Chinese authorities sought to rein in the growth of qigong practices, enacting more stringent requirements on the country's various qigong denominations. In 1996, Falun Gong came under increasing criticism and surveillance from the country's security apparatus.

On 25 April 1999, more than 10,000 practitioners gathered outside Chinese Communist Party (CCP) headquarters in Zhongnanhai to request legal recognition. That evening, then-CCP general secretary Jiang Zemin issued a decision to eradicate Falun Gong. At Jiang's direction, on 7 June 1999, a special leading group was established within the party's Central Committee to manage the persecution. The resulting organisation, called the 610 Office, assumed the role of coordinating the anti-Falun Gong media coverage in the state-run press, as well as influencing other party and state entities such as the courts and security agencies. On 19 July, the Central Committee of the Communist Party issued a document effectively banning the practice of Falun Gong. The following day, hundreds of practitioners were detained by security forces.

The persecution that followed was characterised by a "massive propaganda campaign" intended to justify the persecution by portraying Falun Gong as superstitious, dangerous, and incompatible with the official ideology. Tens of thousands of Falun Gong practitioners were imprisoned, and by the end of 1999, reports began to emerge of torture in custody. According to Ian Johnson, authorities were given broad mandates to eliminate Falun Gong and pursue the coercive conversion of practitioners. Still, they were not scrutinised for the methods they used. This resulted in the widespread use of torture, sometimes resulting in death.

During the crackdown, Li Hongzhi called on his followers to resist the government's persecution and defend Falun Gong's teachings. According to David Ownby, Li began to portray the crackdown as a "final trial" for practitioners and appeared to promise that those who endured the persecution and died as martyrs would attain "consummation", or enlightenment. Ownby noted that Li was outside of China during the crackdown and criticized Li for what he saw as a disparity between the sacrifices that Li was willing to make and of his requests to his followers. Ownby wrote, "Li scorns those practitioners – even in China, where stakes of resistance are high – who lack the courage of their convictions, [and] seems to ask that his followers make sacrifices that he himself has not made".

Tiananmen Square was one of the main venues where Falun Gong practitioners gathered to protest the persecution, usually by raising banners in defence of the group, or staging peaceful meditation sit-ins. Ian Johnson of The Wall Street Journal estimated that by 25 April 2000, more than 30,000 practitioners had been arrested for attempting to demonstrate in Beijing, most of them in or on the way to Tiananmen Square. Seven hundred Falun Gong followers were arrested during a demonstration in the Square on 1 January 2001.

Chinese authorities struggled throughout the early years of the persecution to turn public opinion against Falun Gong. Instead, the campaign garnered criticisms from across a wide spectrum of Chinese society, with an article in a liberal Chinese media outlet on how repression in Nazi Germany escalated over time. According to Human Rights Watch, "the leadership's frustration with the failure of its efforts to quickly and thoroughly dismantle Falungong was also evident in its media campaign." The state-run press admitted in late 2000 that Falun Gong was continuing to stage protests in defiance of the ban, and proclaimed that "the 'broad masses' had to be made to understand the 'duration, complexity and ferocity of our battle with Falun Gong.'" In January 2001, Chinese authorities launched a new wave of propaganda to discredit Falun Gong, in which they urged state-run media organizations to vilify the group.

== Incident ==
On 23 January 2001, the eve of Chinese New Year, five people in Tiananmen Square poured gasoline over their clothes and set themselves on fire.

A CNN film crew, which was there on a routine check for a possible Falun Gong protest, observed a man sitting down on the pavement northeast of the Monument to the People's Heroes at the centre of the square. He proceeded to pour gasoline over himself and set himself ablaze. Police officers quickly congregated on the scene and extinguished the flames. Shortly afterwards, another four people on the square set themselves alight. One of the four, a man, was detained and driven away in a police van.

CNN reported that at least two men were among the five people who immolated themselves after pouring gasoline over their bodies. The CNN crew began filming the events from a distance, but were quickly intercepted by military police, who detained the journalists and confiscated their equipment. The authorities then put out the flames consuming the other four people's clothing. A police van came to collect the badly burnt man. Two ambulances arrived almost 25 minutes later to collect the other four. The square was completely closed, and security was tight the next day, the most important of the traditional Chinese holidays. Police monitored public access to the square for the New Year celebrations, had fire extinguishers ready, and prevented Falun Gong practitioners from opening banners.

=== Participants ===
Xinhua named seven individuals as having been involved: Wang Jindong (王进东), Liu Chunling (刘春玲), Liu Siying (刘思影), Chen Guo (陈果), Hao Huijun (郝惠君), Liu Baorong (刘葆荣) and Liu Yunfang (刘云芳). Of these, Liu Chunling and Liu Siying, as well as Hao Huijun and Chen Guo, were a mother-daughter pair.

Liu Chunling reportedly died on the scene. Her 12-year-old daughter Liu Siying had been hospitalised at Jishuitan Hospital, with fourth-degree burns over 40 percent of her body, requiring the amputation of all ten fingers, when she died on 17 March 2001, "unexpectedly of heart troubles". The other three that set themselves on fire were reported to have been "severely disfigured". Liu Baorong and Liu Yunfang were reportedly stopped by police before they could light themselves on fire.

Initially, Beijing denied requests from Western journalists to interview the survivors, and only China Central Television and the official New China News Agency were permitted to speak with their relatives or colleagues. On 3 February 2001, state media reported statements by two of the self-immolators. Wang Jindong "insist[ed] that he is not worried about his horrific burns because he is a Falun Gong disciple" while Liu Siying "regretted her action and said she was cheated by her mother". In April 2002 the government allowed foreign journalists to interview the survivors in the presence of state officials. The interviewees refuted claims that the self-immolation was staged, showing their burn injuries as evidence, and denounced Falun Gong while expressing support for the authorities' handling of the group. When asked why they set themselves on fire, Hao Huijun replied that she had realized the futility of writing letters and demonstrating by waving banners, "so finally, we decided ... to make a big event to show our will to the world. ... We wanted to show the government that Falun Gong was good." At the time of the interview, Chen Guo and her mother were said to still be in the hospital, both having lost their hands, ears, and noses. Both her mother's eyes were covered with skin grafts. Wang Jindong, showing burns to his face, said he felt "humiliated because of my stupidity and fanatical ideas."

== Chinese media reports ==
The state-run Xinhua News Agency released a story about the incident to foreign media two hours after the self-immolation occurred. Xinhua then distributed a fuller press release seven days later on Tuesday 30 January, in response to other media reports on the incident. On 31 January, a 30-minute special edition of the current affairs programme Forum presented the state's version of the events to the Chinese public. China Central Television aired footage, said to be taken by nearby surveillance cameras, of five people in flames.

Chinese authorities stated that the seven people who had come to Tiananmen Square with the intention of immolating themselves were all from the city of Kaifeng in Henan province. Xinhua asserted that the self-immolators were "avid practitioners" of Falun Gong who had taken up the practice between 1994 and 1997, and that they fantasised during the preceding week about "how wonderful it would be to enter heaven". Six of them reportedly took the train on 16 January, meeting Chen Guo, the daughter of one of them, upon their arrival in Beijing. The seven agreed to light themselves in different parts of the square at 2:30 pm on the designated day, using gasoline smuggled there in plastic soda bottles; each had been armed with two lighters in case one failed. According to the government-run China Association for Cultic Studies website, Wang Jindong stated afterwards that the group arrived in Tiananmen Square by two taxis, and were dropped off at the south of the Great Hall of the People, from where they walked to the spot where they would ignite themselves. Wang said he was approached by police as he was splitting open the soda bottles, and ignited himself hurriedly without assuming the lotus position. A press release from the Chinese government says that Liu Yunfang felt that the police were able to stop him burning himself because he had not attained the "required spiritual level."

Articles in the Yangcheng Evening News and the Southern Daily reported that police had evidence that a few foreign reporters had advance knowledge of the incident, and suggested that such reporters could be charged with "instigating and abetting a suicide." State media claimed surveillance video showed six or seven reporters from CNN, the Associated Press and Agence France-Presse arriving just 10 minutes before the self-immolations took place; however, all three agencies denied advance knowledge of the incident—AP and AFP said they had no reporters in the square at the time. In contrast, CNN's chief news executive, Eason Jordan, said the CNN crew was there on a routine check for a possible Falun Gong protest.

== Falun Gong response ==
Immediately following the self-immolation, the Falun Dafa Information Center denied that the self-immolators could have been Falun Gong practitioners, writing that Falun Gong's teachings prohibit killing and that suicide is considered a sin. Specifically, Wang Jindong was said to be multiple actors and not a real person. Falun Gong has also charged that all of the self-immolators were replaced with actors while inside the ambulance.

Falun Gong sources overseas questioned the official Chinese government account of the event, and apparent inconsistencies in the government's official narrative led to a hypothesis that the government staged the self-immolation to justify the persecution against Falun Gong by portraying its practitioners as irrational and suicidal. According to this hypothesis, the self-immolation participants were paid actors, and were presumably assured that the flames would be extinguished before doing real harm.

Falun Gong sources also noted that the self-immolators' behaviour, the slogans they shouted, and their meditation postures were not consistent with the teachings or practices of Falun Gong. Falun Gong released a frame-by-frame analysis of the CCTV footage which purportedly shows that Liu was actually killed by a deadly blow to the head from a man in a military overcoat. Some Falun Gong sources argue that the government may have killed her as a way of guaranteeing her silence.

== Third-party findings ==
Three pictures broadcast by state-media, presented by Falun Gong as evidence that Wang Jindong "was played by different people"

The identities of some of the self-immolators, and their relationship to Falun Gong, were investigated by Philip Pan of The Washington Post. State-run Xinhua News Agency had reported that Liu Chunling's adoptive mother spoke of Liu's "obsession with Falun Gong", her "worshipping of Li Hongzhi", and that Liu would teach her daughter Falun Gong. Pan's investigation, however, found none of Liu's neighbours had ever observed her practising Falun Gong. Neighbours had described Liu as having "psychological problems" and lead a "troubled life", including allegations that she abused her mother. Most residents in Kaifeng felt disgraced by what Liu had done (i.e. the self-immolation) and the reporter heard that Liu "worked in a nightclub and took money to keep men company. According to David Ownby, a University of Montreal historian and expert on Falun Gong, Pan's portrayal of Liu Chunlin is "hardly a typical profile of a [Falun Gong] practitioner".

Foreign journalists were not allowed to interview the self-immolation victims recovering in hospitals, neither were the victims' relatives, according to David Ownby. Pan wrote that "Beijing denied requests to interview Liu Siying and the three other survivors, who are all hospitalized ... A Kaifeng official said only China Central Television and the official New China News Agency were permitted to speak to their relatives or their colleagues. A man who answered the door at the Liu home referred questions to the government." The state-run press interviewed the survivors, however. In one such interview, conducted less than a week after the incident, the state-owned CCTV interviewed the 12-year-old Liu Siying. Government sources reported Liu Siying had undergone a tracheotomy shortly before the interview. In the interview, Liu Siying stated that her mother had introduced her to Falun Gong in March 2000 and when asked by a CCTV reporter whether she was aware that the fire would hurt her, she responded "I thought the road to the heavenly kingdom was golden".

Ian Johnson observed the state media "reported [the victim's] death with unusual alacrity, implying that either the death took place earlier than reported or the usually cautious media had top-level approval to rush out electronic reports and a televised dispatch."

Pan also questioned the positioning of the cameras, noting that some close-up shots shown on Chinese television appeared to have been taken without police interference. "In some, the camera is clearly behind police barricades," he wrote in The Washington Post. In addition, overhead surveillance camera footage seemed to show a man filming the scene using a small hand-held camera, rather than a large camera of the type used for TV news reporting.

The Age commented that the "ready availability of fire-extinguishers and official TV teams and the lack of verification about the victims" raised questions about whether authorities had advanced knowledge of the self-immolation. Police were on the scene of the self-immolation within 90 seconds, carrying numerous pieces of firefighting equipment. A European journalist was quoted as saying "I have never seen policemen patrolling on Tiananmen Square carrying fire extinguishers. How come they all showed up today? The location of the incident is at least 20 minutes roundtrip from the nearest building – the People's Great Hall", noting that it would have been too late to get the fire extinguishers from the building. John Gittings of The Guardian stated, however, that it was common practice in many countries for police camera operators to be on hand when a public disturbance is anticipated; the police used small-scale fire-extinguishers of the type carried in public vehicles, many of which are routinely on the square.

Scholar James R. Lewis argued that it was highly unlikely that the victims were paid. He wrote that it was likely "a demonstration planned and executed by local practitioners—though directly inspired by a combination of Li Hongzhi's violent apocalyptic vision, his call to non-specific action against the Chinese government, and examples of prior religious suicides and protest suicides". Similarly, Helen Farley described the protest as organized independently of Falun Gong hierarchy but without any Chinese involvement, observing that "some of the adults had participated in previous protests." According to the Hong Kong-based Information Centre for Human Rights and Democracy, all self-immolators except Liu Siying previously participated in protests against China's actions on Falun Gong on Tiananmen.

== Dispute ==
Following the incident, the details of why the individuals were involved have been and remain the subject of dispute between representatives of Falun Gong, the Chinese government, and other observers.

A significant challenge to arriving at a definitive assessment of the event is that independent corroboration of the government's claims has not been possible. According to Human Rights Watch (HRW), the lack of independent information made the incident one of the most difficult stories for reporters in Beijing to report. The New York Times stated that conflicting claims were difficult to assess "[w]ith propaganda streaming in from seemingly opposite ends of the universe ... especially since the remaining Falun Gong practitioners have been driven underground."

Philip Pan's investigation, and other inconsistencies highlighted by Falun Gong organisations, led some human rights observers, such as the Laogai Research Foundation, to entertain the possibility that the self-immolation was not as straightforward as the Chinese official media accounts suggested. In the National Review, Ann Noonan of the Laogai Research Foundation suggested that it was "hardly a far-fetched hypothesis" that the government staged the incident or allowed it to proceed to discredit Falun Gong, as the government vowed to crush the practice before the eightieth anniversary celebrations of the Communist Party in July. Clive Ansley, a Vancouver-based rights lawyer who lived in China during the self-immolation, suggested that a dramatic response by Falun Gong would have been understandable, but ultimately concluded that the event was staged: "You've got Falun Gong people in this country, they've been oppressed over and over again, they are not allowed to speak, they are not allowed to assert any of their rights as citizens, the level of frustration must be terribly, terribly high.. I can understand people doing that.. but ironically, we ultimately found out that it was staged anyway, it was not real. It was completely staged by the government."

Reviewing the divergent narratives on the identity of the self-immolation victims, historian David Ownby concluded that "although the arguments of Falun Gong practitioners seem cogent, it is very difficult to arrive at a final judgment about the self-immolation. ... there are desperate people in China (and elsewhere) who will do anything for money (which would go to their families in this case, one supposes, unless the authorities had promised to rescue them before the flames could do harm). Or the entire event could have been staged. But it seems just as possible that those who set themselves on fire might have been new or unschooled Falun Gong practitioners, had discovered and practised Falun Gong on their own (and badly) in the post-suppression period, and, for whatever reason, decided to make the ultimate sacrifice."

Other human rights activists speculated that the five who set themselves on fire did so to protest the government's crackdown on Falun Gong. Barend ter Haar was open to the idea that the self-immolators were Falun Gong practitioners, and postulated that former Buddhists may have brought with them the "respectable Buddhist tradition of self-immolation as a sacrifice to the Buddha". He sought to account for the inconsistencies by suggesting that the government may have fabricated a video of their own when they realised the mediatic potential of the suicides.

Francesco Sisci, Asia editor of La Stampa, supported the possibility that the self-immolators were Falun Gong practitioners, writing in the Asia Times that "no one believed that the government could have paid a mother to torch herself and her daughter, or that she was so loyal to the Communist Party that she pretended to be a Falungong member and kill herself and her only daughter, even if Falungong master Li Hongzhi forbade suicide ..." In Sisci's view, Chinese officials made a mistake by arresting foreign journalists on Tiananmen —"independently filmed news footage of the proceedings could have been the best proof of Falungong madness. Instead, when the government reported the episode, it looked like propaganda."

Time noted some of the confusion surrounding the conflicting views on the self-immolation; one Beijing Falun Gong practitioner interviewed appeared to accept that the self-immolators were practitioners engaged in protest, while Falun Gong organisations overseas denied any involvement. Time also speculated that the "lack of solidarity" in Falun Gong was contributing to the sense of desperation of mainland Chinese practitioners who may feel out of touch with the exiled leadership. Guardian reporter John Gittings reported that some observers believed the self-immolators might have acted in desperation and confusion.

Some observers have speculated that if the participants were Falun Gong practitioners, they may have resorted to self-immolation in response to the publication of a new scripture by Li Hongzhi released on 1 January 2001, "Beyond the Limits of Forbearance". An article authored by a collection of mainland Chinese Falun Gong practitioners and published on the main Chinese-language Falun Gong website noted that the scripture had confused both among Falun Gong practitioners and "in society," and that some people wondered whether Falun Gong would resort to violence to resist persecution. The authors wrote that this would not occur, as violence would be both counterproductive and contrary to the practice's core teachings. A Falun Gong spokesperson clarified that the new scripture meant it was time to "bring truth to light" about human rights abuses committed by the Chinese government. Nonetheless, Gittings posited that the scripture may have confused Falun Gong followers, particularly in mainland China. Matthew Forney wrote in Time magazine that Li's message had spread into China via the internet and informal networks of followers, and speculated that it may have galvanised more radical practitioners there. David Ownby wrote that he found the brief message to be "difficult to interpret": on its surface, the scripture resembled a "call to arms" against what Li described as "evil beings who no longer have any human nature or righteous thoughts." Yet Ownby said no practitioners he talked to had seen the scripture as a "green light" for violent action. Instead, practitioners had interpreted it to mean exactly the opposite, that they could non-violently resist suppression without guilt; they could stop "simply surrendering to the police at the first moment of a confrontation. They could run away, they could organize, they were, in a word, free of whatever constraints the necessity to "forbear" had previously placed upon them." In an interview with The Washington Post, Ownby noted that Li does not endorse suicide in any of his recent statements, "But a practitioner at the end of his or her rope in China could certainly see [the statements] as an endorsement for martyrdom, and perhaps choose his or her own means to achieve that."

== Aftermath ==
=== Media campaign and public opinion ===
The state media coverage of the event resulted in increased support for the Party's persecution efforts against Falun Gong, and eroded public sympathy for the group. Time reported that before the self-immolation incident, many Chinese had felt that Falun Gong posed no real threat, and that the state's persecution had gone too far. After the event, however, China's media campaign against Falun Gong gained significant traction. The World Organization to Investigate the Persecution of Falun Gong reported that hostility toward Falun Gong from the general public escalated, the government had stepped up its campaign, and charged that "hate crimes" targeting Falun Gong increased. One western diplomat commented that the public changed from sympathising with Falun Gong to siding with the Government, popular consensus seemingly shifted by human-interest stories and accounts of rehabilitation efforts of former practitioners. Østergaard believes that, in retrospect, the New Year scripture was Li's greatest gift to the state, as the self-immolations marked a turning point which ended domestic support for the movement.

The self-immolation incident was given prominent coverage in the official Chinese media, which analysts say took a propagandistic line. According to Philip Pan, the Communist Party "launched an all-out campaign to use the incident to prove its claim that Falun Gong is a dangerous cult, and to turn public opinion in China and abroad against the group ... Every morning and night, the state-controlled media carry fresh attacks against Falun Gong and its U.S.-based leader, Li Hongzhi." Posters, leaflets and videos were produced, detailing the supposed detrimental effects of Falun Gong practice. The New York Times reported that the public was "bombarded with graphic images of the act on television and in newspapers." In China's schools, regular anti-Falun Gong classes were scheduled. Eight million students joined the "Anti-Cult Action by the Youth Civilized Communities Across the Nation". Twelve million children were made to submit writings disapproving of the practice.

Within a month of the Tiananmen Square incident, authorities issued a document entitled The whole story of the self-immolation incident created by Falun Gong addicts in Tiananmen Square, containing colour photographs of charred bodies. The State Council's "Office for the Prevention and Handling of Evil Cults" declared after the event that it was now ready to form a united front with the "global anti-cult struggle". Meetings took place in factories, offices, universities and schools, and approved religious leaders across the country had delivered denunciations of Falun Gong. In Kaifeng, the post office issued an anti-Falun Gong postmark, and 10,000 people signed a petition denouncing the group.

Anti-cult activist Rick Alan Ross dedicated his 2014 book, Cults Inside Out: How People Get in and Can Get Out, to Hao Huijun and Chen Guo, whom he met in 2011 at an international cultic studies conference in Shenzhen, calling them "icons of truthfulness, compassion and forbearance".

==== Continued reports of self-immolation ====
On 16 February 2001, another self-immolation was attributed to Falun Gong. Tan Yihui, a 25-year-old shoeshiner from Hunan province, immolated himself on a street in Beijing at noon, dying at the scene. The news went into broadcast the same day in the 7 p.m. local evening news. State media reported that a six-page suicide note had been found, declaring a belief in Falun Gong and describing the self-immolation as a means to "forget about life and death and achieve perfection in Paradise".

The news again drew suspicions among some journalists. Danny Schechter noted on the incident, "[a]longside a charred body an uncharred note is found allegedly claiming the victim did it to support Li Hongzhi's spiritual practice."

Ian Johnson observed the state media "reported [the victim's] death with unusual alacrity, implying that either the death took place earlier than reported or the usually cautious media had top-level approval to rush out electronic reports and a televised dispatch. The 7 p.m. local evening news, for example, had a filmed report from Mr. Tan's hometown of Changde, a small city in Hunan province. Most reports for the evening news are vetted by noon, so the daily broadcast rarely carries reports from the same day, let alone an event that happened at noon and involved satellite feeds from relatively remote parts of the country."

According to China Daily, on 1 July, Luo Guili immolated himself in Nanning, dying the following day from his injuries.

=== Violence and re-education ===
The Washington Post reported that Chinese authorities benefited from the turn in public opinion against Falun Gong that followed the self-immolation, seizing on the opportunity to sanction "the systematic use of violence against the group." According to the Post, authorities "established a network of brainwashing classes and embarked on a painstaking effort to weed out followers neighbourhood by neighbourhood and workplace by workplace." According to sources, "reeducation" tactics employed included beatings, shocks with electric truncheons, and intensive anti-Falun Gong study classes.

According to a report published in The Wall Street Journal, in February 2001 the 6-10 Office "stepped up pressure on local governments" to implement the anti-Falun Gong campaign. In particular, it issued new, detailed instructions requiring that all who continued to actively practice Falun Gong were to be sent to prison or labour camps, and individuals who refused to renounce the practice were to be socially isolated and monitored by their families and workplaces. This was a shift from the past, when local officials sometimes tolerated Falun Gong on the condition that it was practised privately. According to Freedom House, in the year following the incident, the scale of imprisonment, torture, and deaths of Falun Gong practitioners in custody increased significantly. According to Freedom House, "months of relentless propaganda succeeded in turning public opinion against the group. Over the next year, the scale of imprisonment, torture, and even deaths of Falun Gong practitioners from abuse in custody increased dramatically."

=== Li Hongzhi ===
In July 2001, Craig S. Smith reported in The New York Times that Li had become increasingly critical of his followers in China who were "unable to endure torture or death" in defence of his cosmology. Li had stated that the movement was engaged in a "struggle with evil beings for the redemption or destruction of the universe". Li also stated that Consummation "awaited" those who endured the persecution. In Falun Gong terminology, Consummation is in reference to a transcendent event regarded as the goal of all followers. On Falun Gong website, Li wrote:

"Any fear is itself a barrier that prevents you from reaching consummation".

=== Impact on Falun Gong's resistance ===
The self-immolation necessitated a change in tactics for Falun Gong. Tiananmen Square had been "permanently contaminated" as a venue for protest, according to journalist Ethan Gutmann, and Falun Gong's daily demonstrations in Beijing nearly ceased altogether. According to Human Rights Watch, practitioners may have concluded "the protests had outlived their usefulness for demonstrating Chinese abuses or for informing an overseas audience of Falungong's harmlessness." Diaspora practitioners focused their attentions on getting the word out about the treatment of practitioners by the Chinese government, issuing reports to the United Nations and human rights organisations, staging public marches and hunger strikes outside of China, and documenting human rights abuses on websites. Within China, practitioners used mass mailings and handed out literature to "spread the truth" and counter the government's allegations against them. In an August 2001 press release, the US-based Falun Dafa Information Center noted this shift in strategy. It said Chinese practitioners "sometimes also manage to post large posters and banners in major thoroughfares. They even set up loudspeakers on rooftops or trees around labour camps and in densely populated areas to broadcast news about the human rights abuses."

In 2002, Falun Gong practitioners in Changchun successfully broadcast two films on Chinese state television, accusing the authorities of staging the self-immolation, and interrupting scheduled programming for 50 minutes. Liu Chengjun, a Falun Gong practitioner who hacked into the satellite feed, was arrested and sentenced to prison, where he died 21 months later, allegedly tortured to death. The remaining five individuals behind the television hijacking were also imprisoned, and all have reportedly died or been tortured to death in custody.

=== Fate of the self-immolators ===
Five of the people involved in the incident were sentenced in mid-2001. Although the official Xinhua News Agency described the proceedings as a "public trial," only the final day of the month-long trial was open to the public. It consisted mainly of the reading of verdicts. The Guardian reported that on the last day of the one-month trial, Xinhua had, by mid-morning, issued a full report of the verdicts; the People's Daily had produced its own editorial by the afternoon.

Liu Yunfang, named as the mastermind, was given a life sentence; Wang Jindong was given 15 years. Two other accomplices – a 49-year-old man named Xue Hongjun and a 34-year-old Beijing woman named Liu Xiuqin, who apparently provided the group with lodging and helped prepare the incident – were sentenced to 10 and 7 years in prison, respectively. Liu Baorong, who had "acknowledged her crime", was convicted of homicide, but escaped punishment because she had cooperated with authorities, who considered her role in planning the event as minor. Wang Jindong went on a hunger strike, and his wife and daughter were taken to a reform camp. They were imprisoned in their home province of Henan.

In January 2005, the Associated Press reported that the sentences of three of those involved had been reduced for good behaviour and rehabilitation efforts. Liu Yunfang's life sentence was reduced to 19 years, Wang Jindong's 15-year sentence was reduced to 12½ years while Xue Hongjun's 10-year sentence was reduced to eight years. Additionally, two other self-immolation participants, Hao Huijun and Chen Guo, as well as Wang Jindong's wife and daughter, had been released from custody.

In January 2014, Hao Huijun and Chen Guo underwent several reconstructive surgical procedures in the United States at the expense of billionaire Chen Guangbiao, who stated that he would spend over $2,000,000 on their medical procedures to restore the women's faces to approximately 80% of their original state. A few dozen Falun Gong practitioners organised a protest at a public speaking event in New York City, where Hao Huijun and Chen Guo condemned Falun Gong as a cult, calling the two "propaganda tools of the Chinese government". The film Return - Chen Guo before and after plastic surgery (归来——陈果整容前后) documents Chen Guo's life after the incident. In January 2016, the film was subject of a symposium at the Central Conservatory of Music, where Chen Guo was formerly a student.
