= Free China =

The term "Free China" may mean:

- Free China (Second Sino-Japanese War), also called the Free area of the Republic of China, areas of China not under the control of the invading Imperial Japanese Army
- Free area of the Republic of China, a term used by the government of the Republic of China (Taiwan) since 1991 to contrast itself with the People's Republic of China and avoid acknowledging the latter's control over mainland China; often shortened to "Free China" and used in contrast to "Red China"
- Free China Journal, a former publication of the government of the Republic of China (Taiwan)
- Free China (junk) (zh:自由中國號), a Chinese junk boat
- The Free China Movement, a coalition of about 30 pro-democracy and human rights organizations promoting democracy in China
- Free China: The Courage to Believe, a 2012 American film
- Free China Relief Association, a non-governmental organization

== See also ==
- Nationalist China (disambiguation)
- Red China (disambiguation)
- Communist China (disambiguation)
