= Clint Hostetler =

American politician

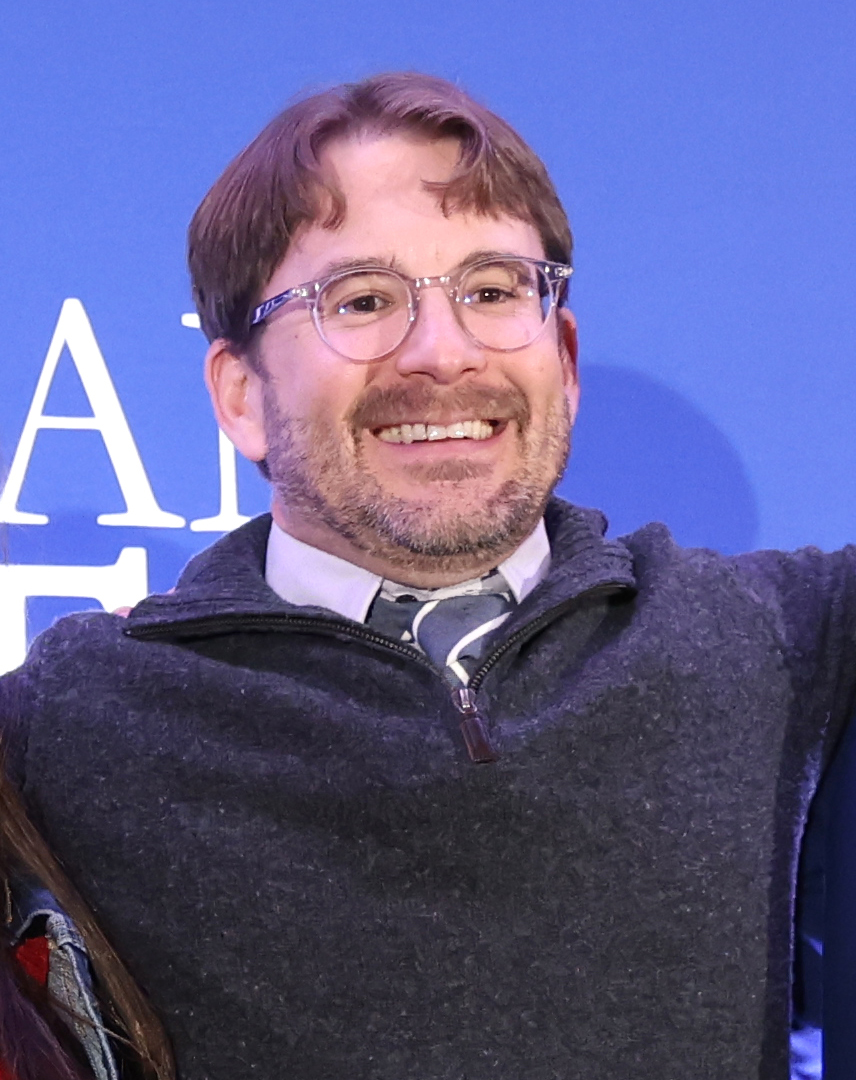
- Hostetler at the 2024 Hazlitt Summit hosted by Young Americans for Liberty Foundation

Member of the Idaho House of Representatives from the 24A district
- Incumbent
- Assumed office December 1, 2024
- Preceded by: Chenele Dixon

Personal details
- Born: Fairfield, California, U.S.
- Party: Republican
- Education: California State University, Sacramento

Clint Hostetler is an American politician. He serves as a Republican member for the 24A district of the Idaho House of Representatives.

== Life and career ==
Hostetler was born in Fairfield, California. He attended California State University, Sacramento, earning his bachelor's degree in 2007.

In May 2024, Hostetler defeated Chenele Dixon in the Republican primary election for the 24A district of the Idaho House of Representatives. No Democratic candidate or incumbent was nominated to challenge him in the general election. He succeeded Dixon. He assumed office on December 1, 2024.
