= Senator Kohl (disambiguation) =

Herb Kohl (1935–2023) was a U.S. Senator from Wisconsin from 1989 to 2013. Senator Kohl may also refer to:

- Jeanne Kohl-Welles (born 1942), Washington State Senate
- Josh Kohl (fl. 2020s), Idaho State Senate

== See also ==
- Senator Koehler (disambiguation)
