= Red China =

Red China may refer to:

- Territories held by Communists during the Chinese Civil War (1927–1949)
- Maoist China, the People's Republic of China under Mao Zedong (1949–1976)
  - the People's Republic of China during the Cultural Revolution (1966–1976)
- People's Republic of China (1949–)

== See also ==
- Communist China (disambiguation)
- Free China (disambiguation)
