= Chen Guangbiao =

Chinese entrepreneur and philanthropist

- 陈光标
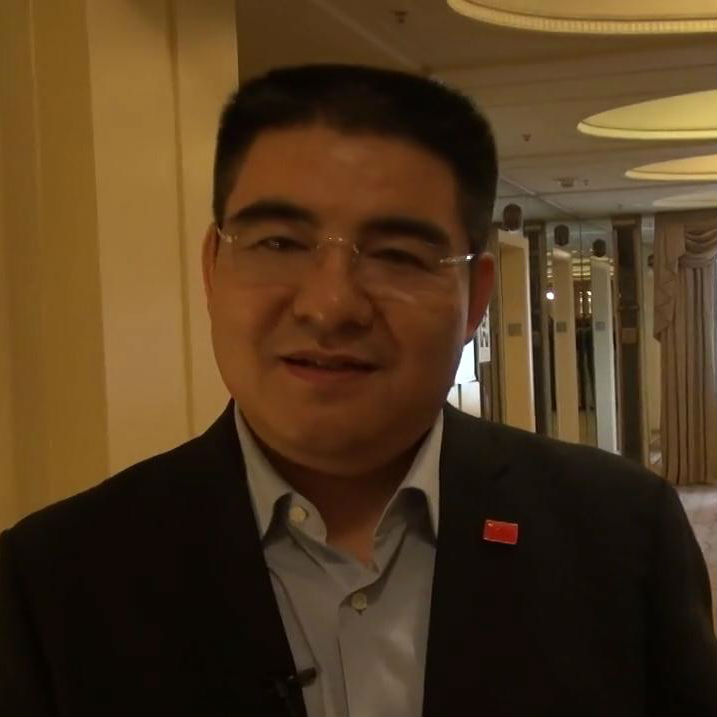
- Born: July 1968 (age 58); Sihong, Jiangsu, China
- Education: Nanjing University of Chinese Medicine; Nanjing University; Peking University; Tsinghua University
- Occupations: Entrepreneur, philanthropist
- Employer: Jiangsu Huangpu Renewable Resources Ltd.
- Political party: China Zhi Gong Party

Chen Guangbiao (Chinese: 陈光标; born July 1968) is a Chinese recycling entrepreneur and philanthropist. He is the founder and chairman of Jiangsu Huangpu Renewable Resources Limited Company and was reportedly worth US$810 million in 2013, according to the rankings of the Chinese wealth research firm, Hurun Report; although, Forbes estimated his wealth at US$400 million in January 2014, while the Associated Press published an estimate of US$750 million in June 2014.

Chen became well known in China for personally rescuing 13 people as part of a broader involvement in the rescue effort following the 2008 Sichuan earthquake. Forbes Asia chose him as one of the 48 leading philanthropists of the Asia Pacific Region in both 2008 and 2009. Chen appeared in international headlines due to his high-profile, but unsuccessful, attempt to buy The New York Times in January 2014. Chen is also known for his publicity stunts and admitted in a January 2014 article in The Wall Street Journal that they are part of his persona. Domestically, his philanthropy has been questioned by several news sources.

== Early life and education ==
Chen was born in July 1968, during the Cultural Revolution, to a farming family in Sihong County in east China's Jiangsu Province, where agricultural conditions were poor. His brother and sister starved to death, and, at the age of 10 years, Chen began supporting his family by selling water in the local village. Chen managed to earn a daily profit of 0.3 yuan (US$0.04), which was equivalent to nearly half of an adult's daily wages at that time. Chen claimed in a 2009 profile for the Beijing Review that he paid for his own tuition, as well as making tuition contributions to help other children in his village, with the money he earned. At the age of 13 years, Chen began selling frozen food products and then started a "foodstuff" business at the age of 17 years.

Chen commenced studies at the Nanjing University of Chinese Medicine in 1985 and, after graduation, he worked at the No. 2 Hospital affiliated with the university, Jiangsu Academy of Social Sciences, and then Hongguang Medicine Company in Nanjing. In 2003, Chen enrolled at the business school of Nanjing University, earning an MBA degree in 2005. He also studied at the Guanghua School of Management of Peking University.

== Career ==
Chen's first fortune was attained after graduating from Nanjing University of Chinese Medicine in the 1990s, as he patented and sold his invention: a "low-radiation ear acupuncture point illness probing and curing apparatus". Chen received the patent in 1994 and claims that the device can detect diseases and determine the sex of a fetus; however, one of Cheng's assistants informed a journalist in 2011 that Cheng is the only person capable of operating the machine.

Chen then became involved with a building demolishment project in 2003 and, after discovering that he could resell the iron from the project, gained a considerable financial profit. His success with the 2003 project led to the establishment of Jiangsu Huangpu Renewable Resources Co. Ltd., Chen's privately owned recycling company that works with construction waste. Chen explained in 2009 that building material, such as red brick and building blocks, could be produced with the use of additives. In October 2009, the Beijing Review stated that the company employed 4,000 people, had expanded to seven other locations and generated annual sales worth 13.3 billion yuan (US$1.95 billion). In March 2011, the company's headquarters was in the city of Nanjing.

Chen's business card was highlighted in a January 2014 Quartz article, which labelled the card as "ridiculous". The article features an image of the card, on which a photograph of Chen is accompanied by a list of titles, including: "Most Influential Person of China", "China Moral Leader", "China Top Ten Most Honorable Volunteer" and "Most Charismatic Philanthropist of China."

Following his unsuccessful New York Times bid, Chen expressed interest in the San Francisco–Oakland Bay Bridge demolition project in January 2014, as two remaining contracts will be advertised in late 2014. The total value of the contracts for the demolition is US$240 million and Chen was informed that he could bid for a contract if his company is insured and becomes a licensed contractor in California, United States (US).

=== The New York Times bid ===
On 30 December 2013, Chen disclosed his plan to buy The New York Times at a ceremony in Shenzhen, China. His announcement caused a sharp rise in the stock of the Times Company, but also attracted widespread criticism and ridicule. A few days later, Chen travelled to New York City to pursue the deal, but The New York Times management declined his request for a meeting. Arthur Sulzberger Jr., publisher of The New York Times, stated in 2013 that the business is not for sale.

Chen explained to The Wall Street Journal that he sought to purchase a globally influential media company and that his Times bid was an attempt to attain a deeper understanding of the way in which Americans perceive the Chinese. Soon afterwards, he announced that he would consider purchasing The Wall Street Journal instead.

== Philanthropy and controversies ==
Chen gained fame in China for his contribution in the aftermath of the 2008 Sichuan earthquake. He arrived in the disaster zone early, and personally rescued 13 survivors and carried about 200 bodies out of the wreckage. Chen was accompanied by a rescue team, consisting of over 100 colleagues, 60 excavators and hoists, that he had arranged, and a June 2014 article in The Washington Post claimed that he slid cash to earthquake victims.

Chen donated US$25 million to charitable causes in 2008, more than half of which went to the Sichuan earthquake relief effort. For his endeavors, Forbes Asia chose him as one of the 48 leading philanthropists of the Asia Pacific region, in both 2008 and 2009. In March 2011, Chen recalled to the Fast Company publication: "I carried more than 200 bodies ... I was covered in blood. When I couldn't cradle them, I hauled them. When I couldn't haul them, I lifted them. To this day, I still have a back problem from it."

In February 2010, Chen commissioned the construction of a wall made of 100-yuan bills, worth 15 million yuan (US$2.28 million), which was a portion of more than US$19 million in cash and goods donated by Chen and 90 other entrepreneurs. The entire amount, including the wall structure, was donated to the poorest areas of the Guizhou, Sichuan and Yunnan provinces of China. In January 2011, Chen was responsible for donating 13,000 parkas to people in three regions of China, an exercise that he also informed the media about.

Also in January 2011, Chen gave away envelopes of cash to people he identified as "in need" on the streets of Taiwan, during a week-long trip, in which he both sought and donated contributions. Chen's exercise aroused the suspicion of Taiwanese officials, in addition to protesters who claimed that Chen's motivation was based in communist ideology, rather than philanthropy. Chen is also credited with distributing a pile of cash worth US$5 million to young entrepreneurs in China, but the date is unclear and the event is rarely mentioned in media articles about Chen. A January 2013 article in The Guardian reported that Chen planned to give away 1.5 million yuan to young Chinese entrepreneurs during February of that year.

In January 2014, Chen announced that he would fund reconstructive surgery for two female former Falun Gong practitioners who set fire to themselves in Tiannamen Square in 2001, as they believed that self-immolation ensured them a place in heaven. Falung Gong supporters asserted that the 2001 incident was staged by the Chinese government, as the organization is opposed to self-harm, and claim that it was a pro-Communist Party publicity stunt. Chen arranged a press conference, at which he pledged US$2 million of his own money to assist mother and daughter Hao Huijun and Chen Guo. The procedures, to be undertaken in New York City, US, are expected to last over six months, and Chen stated that he would also cover the cost of all lodging and food during that time. The two women admitted at the press conference that the self-immolation incident was "our own fault".

On 25 June 2014, Chen hosted an event in conjunction with numerous US charities, including the New York City Rescue Mission, at a Central Park restaurant in New York City, US, where he purchased lunch for over 200 homeless people who had registered for the event. Served by volunteer waiters who wore uniforms similar to those worn by Chinese soldiers in the past, the attendees listened to Chen's vocal renditions of "We Are the World" and a Chinese communist song praising Lei Feng, and were also shown magic tricks performed by Chen. The homeless attendees were initially promised a US$300 cash amount, which the Mission staff offered as a reward for the completion of training or "substance abuse" programs; however, the money was instead given in a lump-sum to the Mission, as Mission staff later raised concerns about the manner in which the money could be spent. According to the Associated Press: "officials urged Chen not to give cash to the group because many are being treated for addictions and the money could be better used for their programs." An anti-Chinese Communist Party group gathered outside the venue to protest the event.

== Politics ==
Chen has been described as a Chinese patriot. On 31 August 2012, he purchased an advertisement in The New York Times supporting China's claim to the disputed Diaoyu/Senkaku Islands. According to Chen, the purpose of publishing the advertisement was to show the determination of Chinese entrepreneurs in defending China's sovereign rights.

Chen has attracted attention for his publicity exercises involving environmentalist politics. In December 2012, covered by a sheet of wood and steel, Chen allowed two cars to drive over him to demonstrate that the world would be better without cars. The following month, in January 2013, Chen distributed cans of fresh air in China to raise awareness of the air pollution problems in the country. Chen explained to the media: "If we don't act in the next 10 years, our descendants will have to carry oxygen tanks and wear masks all the time."

== Criticism ==
Jeremy Goldkorn has described Chen as "a clown whose so-called philanthropy appears to consist entirely of self-promotional stunts." Chen has been ridiculed for his love of the media spotlight, with some claiming that his TCM diagnostic machine invented in the 1990s is a scam.

In regard to Chen's philanthropy, a social scientist from Tsinghua University stated in 2011: "not only does not solve the problem of poverty. On the contrary, it can nurture passivity. I don't think Chen Guangbiao knows who needs this money." Chinese-language media outlets have also criticized Chen's philanthropic activities and claims following the investigations of journalists. A New Express report in April 2011 claimed that donation recipients they had contacted had not received the full amount that was pledged, while other recipients did not actually exist. The Southern Metropolitan Daily and Southern People Weekly also published articles stating that many of the donations were never fulfilled.

Chinese journalists reported the receipt of death threats, including photos of dead bodies sent by email, after investigative articles on Chen were published. According to the Fast Company publication, a Chinese government directive, issued on September 29, 2010, stated: "All newspapers are forbidden from reporting negative news about Chen Guangbiao." Media articles have shown that Chen has achieved popularity among the people of China and Taiwan, and he explained in June 2014:

I regret nothing ... I am not afraid of what people say about me. I have not done anything that harms anyone. I think society needs diverse innovation. I will keep on giving positive energy through my creative solutions for problems.

In September 2016 the Chinese investigative newspaper Caixin published a long exposé on Chen, which included interviews with several sources who disputed Chen's self-reported donation amounts.

== Personal life ==
Chen owns over 10 homes in China, including three in Nanjing. He has a surviving younger brother, who runs a guesthouse, and sister, who is a janitor. In relation to his siblings, Chen explained in June 2014: "I have not given them money because they earn their own money. I pay for their children's school fees."
