= Casey Swensen =

American politician

Member-elect of the Idaho Senate from the 25th district
- Assuming office December 2026
- Succeeding: Josh Kohl

Personal details
- Party: Republican

Casey Swensen is an American politician. A member of the Republican Party, he is the member-elect for the 25th district of the Idaho Senate.
