= Communist China =

Communist China may refer to:

- People's Republic of China (PRC), the modern state known as "China"
- Chinese Communist Party (CCP)
- Communist-controlled China (1927–1949)
  - Chinese Soviet Republic (CSR)
- History of the People's Republic of China

== See also ==
- Red China (disambiguation)
- Free China (disambiguation)
