= Free China: The Courage to Believe =

- Film poster
- Directed by: Michael Perlman
- Production company: NTD Television
- Release date: 2012
- Country: United States
- Languages: English; Chinese

Free China: The Courage to Believe is a 2012 documentary film (61 minutes) about the persecution of Falun Gong, starring Jennifer Zeng and Dr. Charles Lee.

== Synopsis ==
The film is based on a true story of a mother and former Communist Party member, Jennifer Zeng, who along with more than 70 million Chinese were practicing Falun Gong, a belief that combined Buddhism and Daoism until the Chinese Government outlawed it. The Internet police intercepted an email and Jennifer was imprisoned for her faith. As she endured physical and mental torture, she had to decide: does she stand her ground and languish in jail, or does she recant her belief so she can tell her story to the world and be reunited with her family?

A world away, Dr. Charles Lee, a Chinese American businessman, wanted to do his part to stop the persecution by attempting to broadcast uncensored information on state controlled television. He was arrested in China and sentenced to three years of re-education in a prison camp where he endured forced labor, making, among other things, Homer Simpson slippers sold at stores throughout the US.

With more than one hundred thousand protests occurring each year inside China, unrest among Chinese people is building with the breaking of each political scandal. This documentary examines political and social issues in China, including protests, political scandals, allegations of genocide, and trade relations with Western countries. It also explores the role of Internet technologies in facilitating communication and political expression in China and other repressive regimes throughout the world.

== Interviewees in the film ==
- Jennifer Zeng - author of Witnessing History: One Chinese Woman’s Fight for Freedom
- Dr. Charles Lee - Chinese American businessman and labor camp survivor
- David Kilgour - human rights investigator and former Canadian Secretary of State (Asia-Pacific)
- Chris Smith - US Congressman and chair of the Congressional-Executive Commission on China
- Ethan Gutmann - China analyst, human rights investigator, author of The Slaughter: Mass Killings, Organ Harvesting, and China's Secret Solution to Its Dissident Problem and Losing The New China: A Story of Commerce, Desire, and Betrayal. Contributor for The Wall Street Journal Asia

== Awards and other information ==
The film won awards at 8 film festivals, including American INSIGHT's 2012 Free Speech Film Festival and WorldFest's 2012 Film Festival.

The film was produced and directed by award-winning filmmakers Kean Wong and Michael Perlman. The film has screened at over 700 private venues including the UK, European and Israeli parliaments and the US Congress. The film will be available in over 20 languages by the end of 2014.

The soundtrack, trailers, and DVDs of the film are available on the Free China website.

The most recent screenings of the film were on 5–7 December 2014 in Taiwan.

The online premiere was on 3 February 2015.

== See also ==
- Persecution of Falun Gong
- Documentaries about the Persecution of Falun Gong
- Forced Organ harvesting from Falun Gong practitioners in China
