= Josh Kohl =

American politician

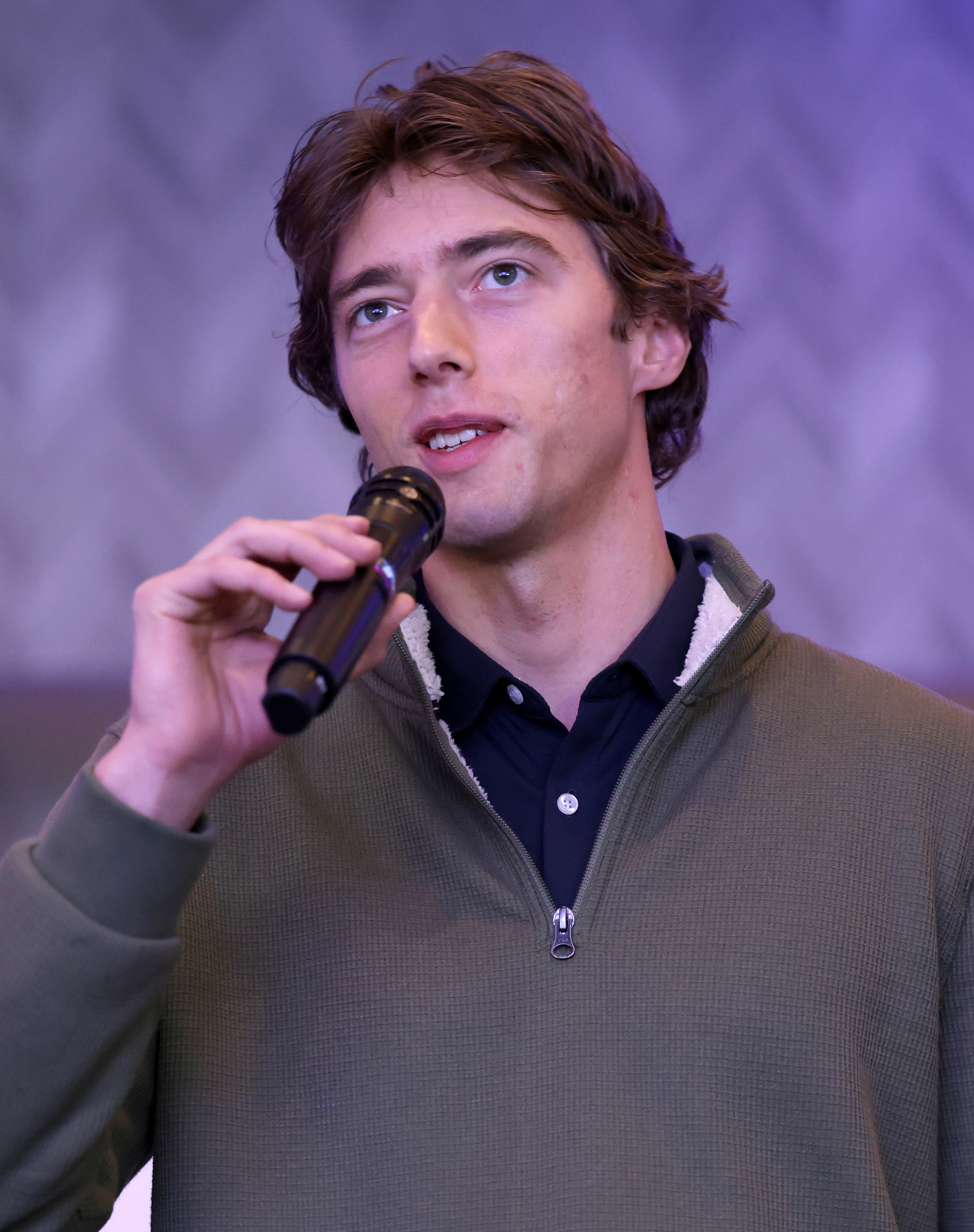
- Kohl at the 2024 Hazlitt Summit hosted by Young Americans for Liberty Foundation

Member of the Idaho Senate from the 25th district
- Incumbent
- Assumed office December 1, 2024
- Preceded by: Linda Wright Hartgen
- Succeeded by: Casey Swensen (elect)

Personal details
- Born: Idaho, U.S.
- Party: Republican
- Education: University of Idaho

Josh Kohl is an American politician. He serves as a Republican member for the 25th district of the Idaho Senate.

== Life and career ==
Kohl was born in Idaho. He attended the University of Idaho, earning his bachelor's degree in 2019.

In May 2024, Kohl defeated Linda Wright Hartgen in the Republican primary election for the 25th district of the Idaho Senate. No Democratic candidate or incumbent was nominated to challenge him in the general election. He succeeded Hartgen. He assumed office on December 1, 2024.

Kohl was defeated by Casey Swensen in the Republican primary election for the 25th district on May 19, 2026.
