= Nationalist China (disambiguation) =

Nationalist China refers to the Kuomintang-led government of the Republic of China from 1925 to 1948, also known as the Second Republic of China.

Nationalist China may also refer to:

- Republic of China (1912–1949), under Kuomintang rule 1928–1949
- Free area of the Republic of China, ruled by the Kuomintang on Taiwan before democratization, during the Cold War occasionally referred to by the West as "Free China"

== See also ==
- Free China (disambiguation)
