= Chenele Dixon =

American politician

Member of the Idaho House of Representatives from the 24A district
- In office December 1, 2022 – November 30, 2024
- Succeeded by: Clint Hostetler

Personal details
- Party: Republican

Chenele Dixon is an American politician. She served as a Republican member for the 24A district of the Idaho House of Representatives.
