= Falun Gong outside mainland China =

Falun Gong, a new religious movement that combines meditation with the moral philosophy articulated by founder Li Hongzhi, first began spreading widely in China in 1992. Li's first lectures outside mainland China took place in Paris in 1995. At the invitation of the Chinese ambassador to France, he lectured on his teachings and practice methods to the embassy staff and others. From that time on, Li gave lectures in other major cities in Europe, Asia, Oceania, and North America. He has resided permanently in the United States since 1998. Falun Gong is now practiced in some 70 countries worldwide, and the teachings have been translated to over 40 languages. The international Falun Gong community is estimated to number in the hundreds of thousands, though participation estimates are imprecise on account of a lack of formal membership.

Led by Li Hongzhi, who is viewed by adherents as a deity-like figure, Falun Gong practitioners operate a variety of organizations in the United States and elsewhere, including the dance troupe Shen Yun. They are known for their opposition to the Chinese Communist Party (CCP), espousing anti-evolutionary views, opposition to homosexuality and feminism, and rejection of modern medicine, among other views described as "ultra-conservative".

The Falun Gong also operates the Epoch Media Group, which is known for its subsidiaries, New Tang Dynasty Television and The Epoch Times newspaper. The latter has been broadly noted as a politically far-right media entity, and it has received significant attention in the United States for promoting conspiracy theories, such as QAnon and anti-vaccine misinformation, and producing advertisements for U.S. President Donald Trump. It has also drawn attention in Europe for promoting far-right politicians, primarily in France and Germany.

Since 1999, the Chinese Communist Party (CCP) has persecuted Falun Gong in mainland China. In response, Falun Gong practitioners around the world have conducted activities aimed at raising awareness about related human rights issues. These include lobbying, passing out of flyers, participating in sit-ins in front of Chinese embassies and consulates, and staging parades and demonstrations. They have established media outlets, have founded advocacy and research organizations to report information on the persecution in China, and launched lawsuits against the alleged architects and participants of the persecution campaign.

Several foreign governments, the United Nations, and human rights organizations such as Amnesty International and Human Rights Watch have expressed their concerns over allegations of torture and ill-treatment of Falun Gong practitioners in China. Nonetheless, some observers have noted that Falun Gong has failed to attract the level of sympathy and sustained international attention afforded to Tibetans, Chinese Christians or democracy activists. This has been attributed to the group's unsophisticated PR skills, the impact of the CCP's propaganda against the practice, or the foreign nature of its teachings, which identify with Buddhist and Daoist traditions.

== History ==
From 1992 to 1994, Li Hongzhi traveled throughout China giving week-long seminars on Falun Gong's spiritual philosophy and exercises and meditation practices. In late 1994, he declared that he had finished his work of teaching the practice in China, and the content of his lectures was compiled in the book Zhuan Falun, published in January 1995. Later that year, Li left China and began teaching the practice overseas, beginning with a stop at the Chinese embassy in Paris in March 1995, followed by lectures in Sweden in May 1995. Between 1995 and 1999, Li gave lectures in the United States, Canada, Australia, New Zealand, Germany, Switzerland, and Singapore. Falun Gong associations and clubs began appearing in Europe, North America and Australia, with activities centered mainly on university campuses.

As the practice began proliferating outside China, Li was the recipient of a measure of recognition in the United States and elsewhere in the western world. In August 1994, the city of Houston named Li as an honorary citizen and goodwill ambassador for his "unselfish public service for the benefit and welfare of mankind." In May 1999, Li was welcomed to Toronto with greetings from the mayor and the provincial governor general, and in the two months that followed also received recognition from the cities of Chicago and San Jose.

Translations of Falun Gong teachings began appearing in the late 1990s. Although the practice was beginning to attract an overseas constituency, it remained relatively unknown in the Western world until the Spring of 1999, when tensions between Falun Gong and CCP authorities became a subject of international media coverage. With the increased attention, the practice gained a greater following outside China. Following the launch of the CCP's persecution of Falun Gong, the overseas presence became vital to the practice's resistance in China and its continued survival.

== Organization ==
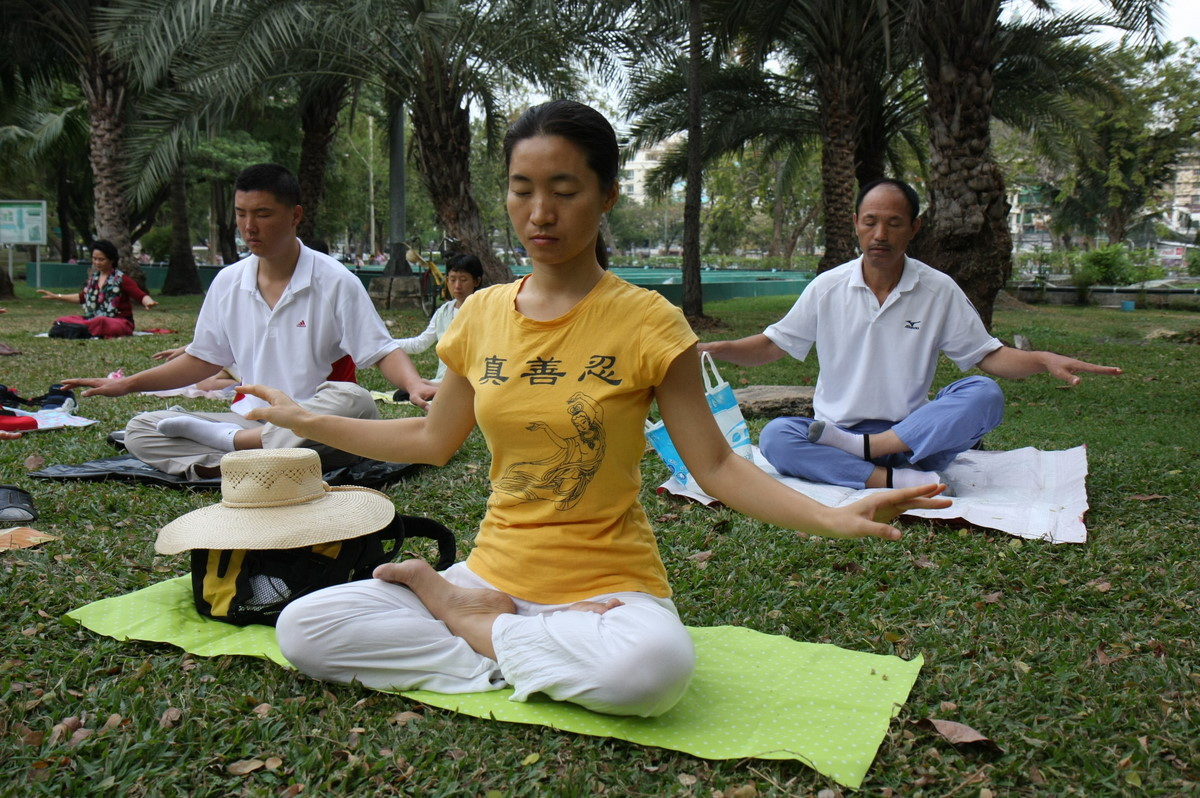
Falun Gong adherents in Bangkok practicing meditation

Falun Gong embraces a minimal organizational structure, and does not have a rigid hierarchy, physical places of worship, fees, or formal membership. As a matter of doctrinal significance, Falun Gong is intended to be "formless," having little to no material or formal organization. Practitioners of Falun Gong are forbidden to solicit donations or charge fees for the practice, and are similarly forbidden to teach or interpret the teachings for others.

In the absence of membership or initiation rituals, a Falun Gong practitioner can be anyone who chooses to identify themselves as such. Students participate in the practice and follow its teachings as much or as little as they like, and practitioners do not instruct others on what to believe or how to behave.

Falun Gong can be said to be highly centralized in the sense that neither spiritual nor practical authority is dispersed. Li Hongzhi's spiritual authority within the practice is absolute, yet the organization of Falun Gong works against totalistic control. Li does not intervene in the personal lives of practitioners, who have little to no contact with Li, except through the study of his teachings. Volunteer "assistants" or "contact persons" coordinate local activities, but they do not hold authority over other practitioners, regardless of how long they have practiced Falun Gong; they cannot collect money, conduct healings, or teach or interpret doctrine for others.

Falun Gong's nebulous structure and lack of membership makes it difficult to gauge the scope and size of Falun Gong communities outside China. Local groups post their practice site times on Falun Gong websites, but do not attempt to keep up with how many practitioners there are in certain areas. University of Montreal historian David Ownby notes that there are no "mid- or upper-level tiers of the organization where one might go for such information." He says that practitioners are not "members" of an "organization", and do not fill out any forms at any point.

To the extent that organization is achieved in Falun Gong, it is accomplished partly through a global, networked, and often virtual community. In particular, electronic communications, email lists and a collection of websites are the primary means of coordinating activities and disseminating Li Hongzhi's teachings. In addition to disseminating teachings, the internet serves to forge and maintain community, and is used as a medium for raising awareness of the persecution in China. Practitioners maintain hundreds of websites around the world. Most contain content in both Chinese and English, while others include German, French, Russian, Portuguese, Spanish, Japanese, and other languages.

Falun Gong's reliance on the internet as a means of organizing has led to the group's characterization by some observers as "a virtual religious community," though other scholars are wary about overstating the significance of the internet. Scott Lowe, for instance, believes that the Internet is not a significant factor in attracting people to the practice; instead, the influence of family and friends, as well as the prospect of better health, seem far more important in establishing initial interest.

Although the spiritual practice of Falun Gong has little clear organization, practitioners of Falun Gong have organized considerably among themselves since 1999, establishing their own research and advocacy organizations, media groups, and arts companies.

== Group exercise and study ==
Outside mainland China, a network of volunteer "contact persons," regional Falun Dafa Associations and university clubs exists in approximately 70 countries. In most mid- to large-sized cities, Falun Gong practitioners organize regular group meditation or study sessions in which they practice Falun Gong exercises and read (or re-read) Li Hongzhi's writings. The exercise and meditation sessions are described as informal groups of practitioners who gather in public parks—usually in the morning—for one to two hours. Group study sessions typically take place in the evenings in private residences or university or high school classrooms, and are described by David Ownby as "the closest thing to a regular 'congregational experience'" that Falun Gong offers. Individuals who are too busy, isolated, or who simply prefer solitude may elect to practice privately.

Large Falun Gong "experience-sharing" conferences are also held every several months in major metropolitan areas, in which Falun Gong students read prepared testimonials detailing their experiences in the practice. These conferences, which can attract audiences of thousands, also provide a venue for Li Hongzhi to address practitioners.

== Evangelism ==
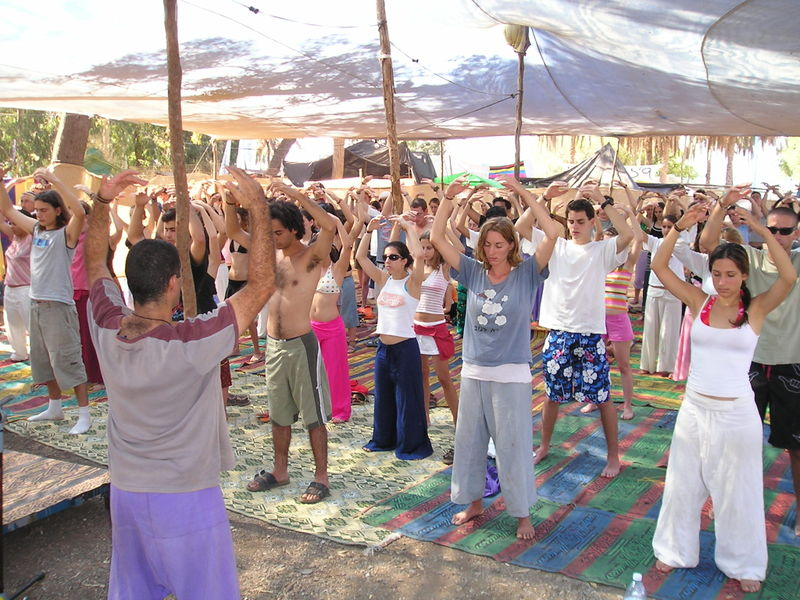
People learn Falun Gong exercises in Israel

Practitioners of Falun Gong are encouraged to engage in Hong Fa activities, meaning "making known the way." The Chinese term "Hong Fa" may be interpreted to refer to proselytizing, yet because Falun Gong espouses a belief that individuals are either predestined or not to obtain the practice, practitioners of Falun Gong do not actively attempt to convert people. Hong Fa activities include handing out flyers in the subway or at the mall, leaving Falun Gong literature in stores, libraries, etc., and participating in activities such as marches, parades, and Chinese cultural events.

== Demographics ==
Ownby confirms estimates that Falun Gong is practiced by hundreds of thousands of people outside China, with the largest communities found in Taiwan and in North American cities with large Chinese populations, such as New York City, San Francisco, Vancouver, and Toronto. Demographic surveys by sociologist Susan Palmer and David Ownby in North American communities found that 90% of practitioners were ethnic Chinese (in Europe, there are proportionally more Caucasians). The average age was approximately 42. Among survey respondents, 56% were female and 44% male; 80% were married. The surveys found the respondents to be highly educated: 9% held PhDs, 34% had master's degrees, and 24% had a bachelor's degree.

Most of the Falun Gong practitioners in North America were among the Chinese students who emigrated in the 1960s, 1970s, 1980s and 1990s. In Craig Burgdoff's ethnographic research of Ohio practitioners, he found that 85–90% were Chinese graduate students or their family members. Similar results for North American practitioners were borne out by Scott Lowe, a professor of Philosophy and Religious Studies at the University of Wisconsin-Eau Claire. In a 2003 Internet survey, Lowe found that the Chinese respondents living in Western nations were "uniformly well educated, clearly representing the expatriate elite", with all respondents holding a master's degree or higher. Respondents from Singapore and Malaysia had a more mixed educational profile, with a minority holding university degrees.

The preponderance of North American practitioners learned Falun Gong after leaving China. Ownby suggests that Falun Gong appealed to a broad spectrum of social groups, "including university professors and students, high party and government officials, well-educated cadres and members of the comfortable middle class, and [...] the old, the infirm, the unemployed, and the desperate." In contrast to the typical mainland Chinese practitioner, who is likely to be a female retiree, Ownby's survey at practitioners' conferences in Montreal, Toronto, and Boston between 1999 and 2002 found the average Chinese practitioner in North America to be "young, urban, dynamic". Non-Chinese Falun Gong practitioners tend to fit the profile of non-conformists and "spiritual seekers" — people who had tried a variety of qigong, yoga, or religious practices before finding Falun Gong. This stands in contrast to the standard profile of Chinese, whom Ownby described as "the straightest of straight arrows".

== Reasons for practicing Falun Gong ==
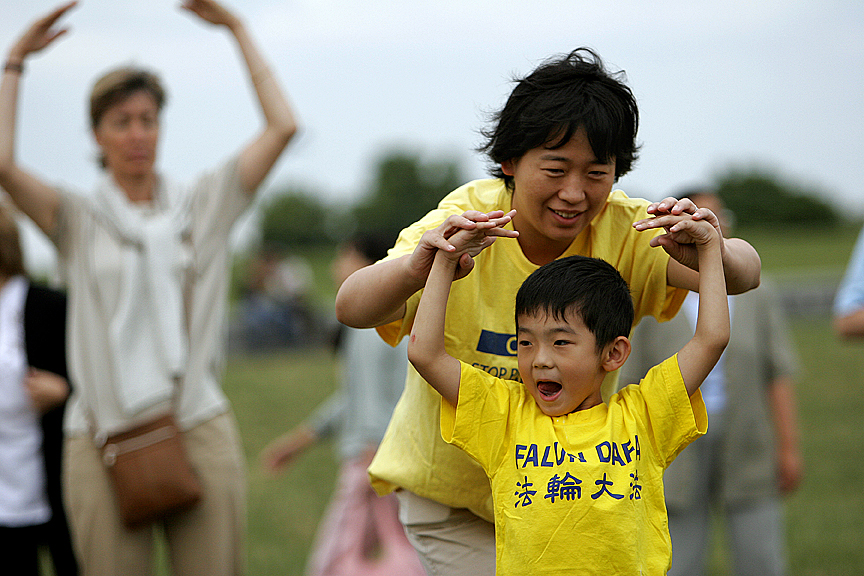
At a Falun Gong group exercise site, a child is taught the second exercise of the practice

In surveys of the Falun Gong practitioners in North America, the most commonly reported reasons for being attracted to the practice were the teachings, cultivation exercises, and health benefits. In a study conducted by David Ownby, close to 30% of practitioners said they were attracted to Falun Dafa for its "intellectual content", 27% for "spiritual enlightenment", 20% for "health benefits", 15% the exercises, 7% for Li Hongzhi himself, and 2% for the community. The "intellectual content", according to Ownby, refers to the value of Falun Dafa doctrine in describing the "functioning of the moral and physical universe."

Scott Lowe's survey found that Falun Gong's spiritual teachings and promise of good health were the most common reasons for people to have taken up the practice. In Lowe's survey, 22 respondents gave "Master Li's philosophy and his answers to life's most difficult questions" as their primary attraction to the practice, while another twenty were attracted for health benefits. Nine were drawn by the moral principles, twelve by the books, ten by the exercises, and small numbers of others by a variety of other factors. Several respondents apparently realized that other forms of qigong were "shallow, exoteric, and superficial," while they came to believe that Falun Gong is the "most complete, efficacious, and comprehensive system of spiritual cultivation on the planet."

In Lowe's survey, the practitioners were asked if their attraction to and focus on Falun Gong practice had changed over time. Ten claimed that they had no change, since they started Falun Gong with the intention of gaining enlightenment, which is the goal of practice. Others, over time, put less emphasis on the health improvements they experienced, which they came to see "as a relatively trivial result of cultivation." Twenty-six respondents said they felt a newfound sense of moral certitude and spiritual growth, while ten "discovered a firm determination to carry their cultivation through to the end goal of enlightenment or consummation, no matter what obstacles might appear in their path."

== Overseas responses to persecution in China ==
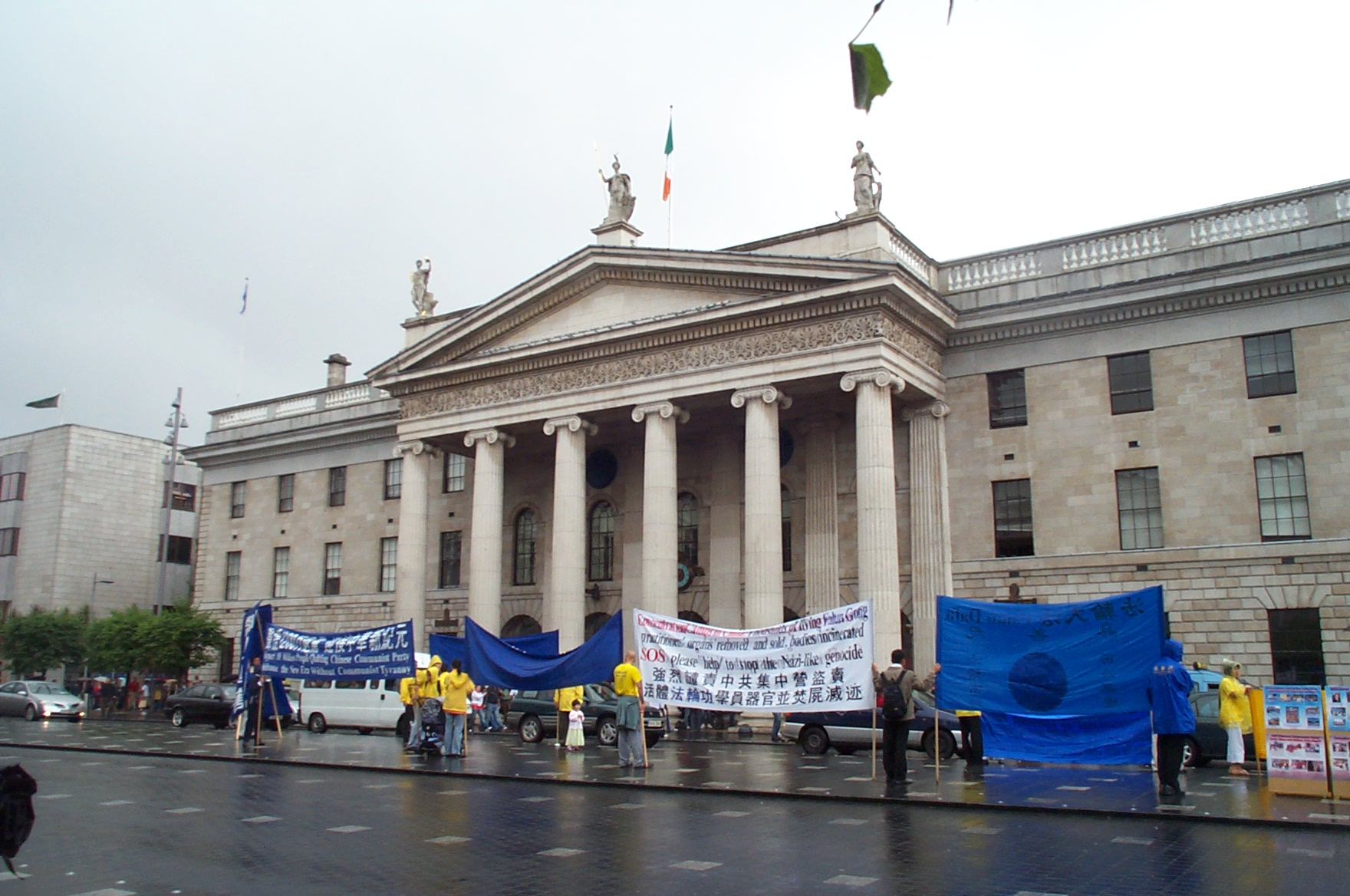
Falun Gong protesters in front of General Post Office, Dublin.

In July 1999, the CCP initiated a campaign to persecute Falun Gong, including through the use of extralegal imprisonment, torture and other coercive measures, and propaganda. Falun Gong communities inside and outside China have adopted a variety of approaches to resist and mitigate the persecution in China. These tactics range from engagement with the media, lobbying of governments and NGOs, public protests and demonstrations, and attempts to seek legal redress. As the persecution in China progressed, overseas Falun Gong efforts increasingly tied their pleas for relief to Western human rights discourse, emphasizing the implications for freedom of speech, assembly, and conscience.

=== Legal initiatives ===
Lawyers acting on behalf of Falun Gong practitioners have filed dozens of largely symbolic lawsuits around the world against CCP General Secretary Jiang Zemin, CCP Political and Legal Affairs chief Luo Gan, and other Chinese officials alleging genocide and crimes against humanity. According to International Advocates for Justice, Falun Gong has filed the largest number of human rights lawsuits in the 21st century and the charges are among the most severe international crimes defined by international criminal laws. As of 2006, 54 civil and criminal lawsuits were under way in 33 countries.

In some instances, courts have refused to adjudicate Falun Gong cases against Chinese officials on the grounds of sovereign immunity. In November 2009, however, Jiang Zemin and Luo Gan were indicted by a Spanish court on charges of genocide and crimes against humanity for their involvement in the persecution of Falun Gong. One month later, an Argentine judge concluded that Jiang and Luo had adopted a "genocidal strategy" in pursuing the eradication of Falun Gong, and asked Interpol to seek their arrest.

In May 2011, a lawsuit was filed on behalf of Falun Gong practitioners against technology giant Cisco. The suit alleges, based mainly on internal Cisco documents, that the technology company "designed and implemented a surveillance system for the Chinese Communist Party, knowing it would be used to root out members of the Falun Gong religion and subject them to detention, forced labor and torture." Cisco denies customizing its products to facilitate censorship or repression.

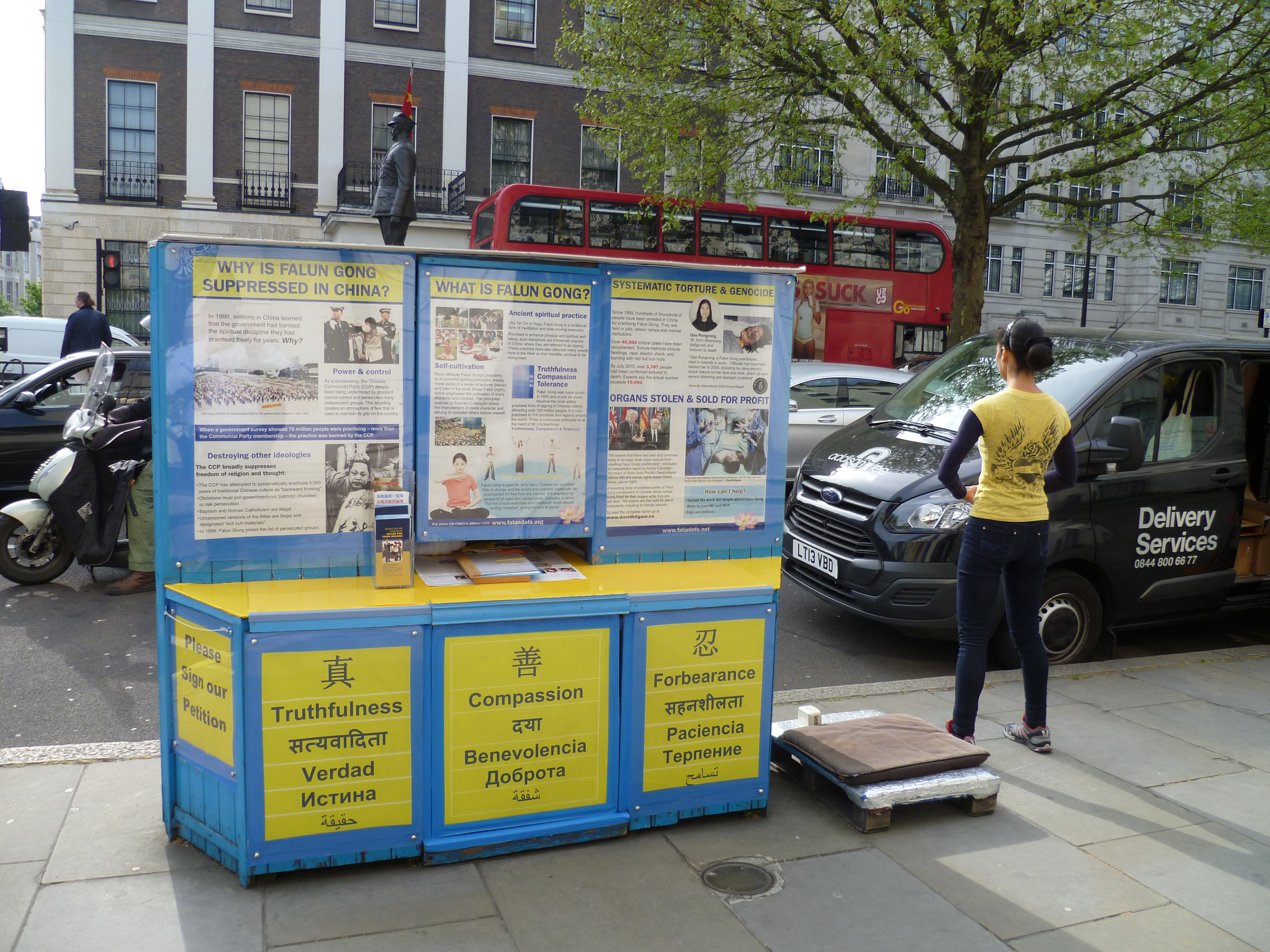
The Falun Gong protest in London opposite the Chinese Embassy

In addition to high-profile lawsuits against Chinese officials and corporations, Falun Gong practitioners have filed a number of complaints and civil suits alleging discrimination outside China, most of them centered within the Chinese diaspora community. Several complaints have been made after Falun Gong groups were barred from participating in parades or events, with mixed results. In Canada and in New York, Falun Gong practitioners won judgments against Chinese businesses or community organizations for discriminating against them on the basis of their religious creed.

Practitioners of Falun Gong have been involved in a number of defamation cases against Chinese-language media outlets or agents of the Chinese government. In 2004, a Canadian Falun Gong practitioner Joel Chipkar won a libel case against Pan Xinchun, an officer at the Chinese consulate in Toronto, who had called Chipkar a member of a "sinister cult" in a newspaper article. Pan was ordered to pay $10,000 in damages to Chipkar, but left the country before paying. In 2008, the Appeals Court of Quebec, Canada, ruled that a Chinese language newspaper "Les Presses Chinoises" had defamed Falun Gong when it depicted the practice as dangerous and perverse. The court did not award damages, however, on the basis that the defamation targeted the group, rather than the individual plaintiffs

=== Media organizations ===
In the early 2000s, Falun Gong practitioners in the United States began establishing their own Chinese-language media organizations to gain wider exposure for their cause and challenge the narratives of the dominant Chinese state-run media. These include The Epoch Times newspaper, New Tang Dynasty Television, and Sound of Hope radio station. In addition to carrying content related to Falun Gong, they became vocal critics of CCP policies more generally, carrying reports on other human rights issues in China, on corruption, environment and public health issues, and other topics. According to communications professor Yuezhi Zhao, these media organizations are an example of how Falun Gong entered into a "de facto media alliance" with China's democracy movements in exile, as demonstrated by its frequent printing of articles by prominent overseas Chinese critics of the mainland Chinese government.

Although initially created to address the needs of the Chinese-language media market, the media organizations have expanded into dozens of additional languages; The Epoch Times publishes in 21 languages and 33 countries, and NTD Television has a satellite or cable presence in North America, Europe, and Asia, and produces programs in 18 languages. The organizations maintain that they are not formally affiliated with Falun Gong, which lacks both a centralized organization and funds. However, most of their staff are Falun Gong practitioners, and many contribute on a volunteer basis.

=== Demonstrations and sit-ins ===
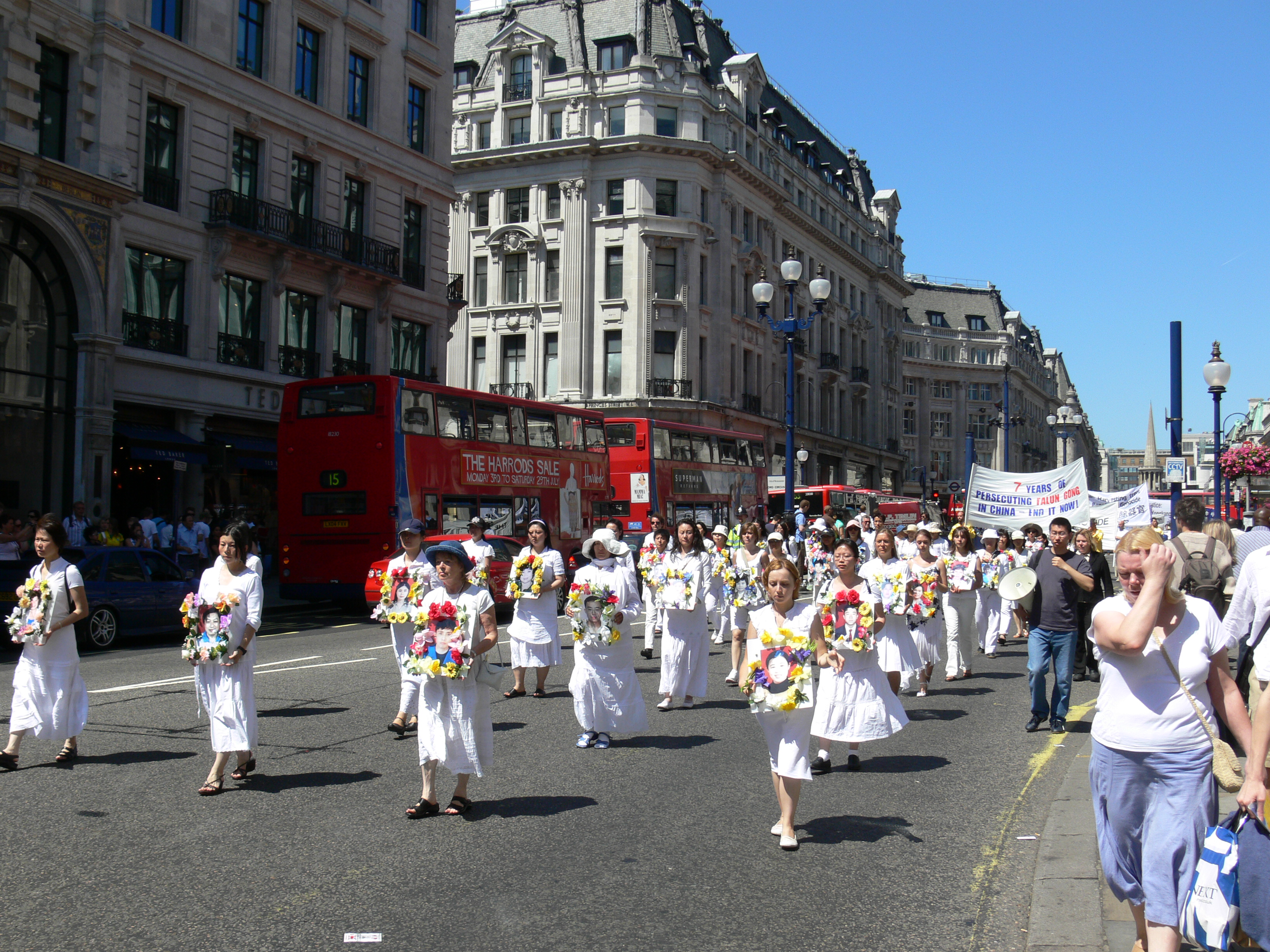
A Falun Gong procession in London commemorates practitioners persecuted in China

After the launch of the persecution campaign in 1999, practitioners outside China began holding frequent protests, rallies, and appeals. These include large-scale marches, demonstrations, and vigils to coincide with notable anniversaries, such as April 25, 1999, and July 20, 1999. Marches typically involve participants holding signs and banners, devoting different sections of the parade to different aspects of the persecution. There is usually a section involving participants wearing only white (symbolizing mourning) and holding photos of those killed in China.

Practitioners also stage sit-ins and demonstrations outside Chinese embassies and consulates. Falun Gong practitioners in Vancouver, British Columbia, Canada continue to stage the world's longest, continuous protest against the persecution. It which runs twenty-four hours a day at the entrance to the PRC consulate on Granville Street. In June 2006, it was announced by the mayor of Vancouver that the protest signs and structures must be taken down in accordance with a by-law against building permanent structures on public property. In 2010, the B.C. Court of Appeal ruled that the city's order to remove the protest structures was unconstitutional, and the structure was restored.

Anniversaries of significant dates in the persecution are marked with protests by Falun Gong communities around the world. In Washington DC, for instance, the anniversary of 20 July 1999 is marked by a rally at the U.S. capitol attended by several thousand practitioners. Diplomatic visits by high-ranking Chinese officials are also met with demonstrations by Falun Gong practitioners.

=== Parades ===
In contrast to marches, which focus on bringing attention to the persecution in China, celebratory Falun Gong parades usually incorporate traditional-style Chinese dances, costumes, song, exercise demonstrations, drumming, floats, and banners. Practitioners regularly hold parades or public exhibitions of Chinese cultural performances to coincide with May 13, the anniversary of the practice's first public teaching in China. Practitioners also utilize various parade venues around the world to publicize their group and its message.

=== Arts and culture ===
A number of Falun Gong practitioners and organizations outside China are engaged in the promotion of classical visual and performing arts. Practitioners frame Falun Gong as being part of the wider cultural tradition that gave rise to Chinese arts, which they describe as having been persecuted and attacked under CCP rule.

Falun Gong devotees trained in the visual arts have held exhibitions of their works as a means of representing their beliefs and practice, and raising awareness of the persecution in China. These include Zhang Cuiying, an Australian painter who was imprisoned in China for practicing Falun Gong, and Zhang Kunlun, a Canadian citizen and former professor who was also imprisoned in China. Zhang Kunlun is part of a collective of twelve Falun Gong visual artists whose exhibit "The Art of Zhen Shan Ren" travels internationally.

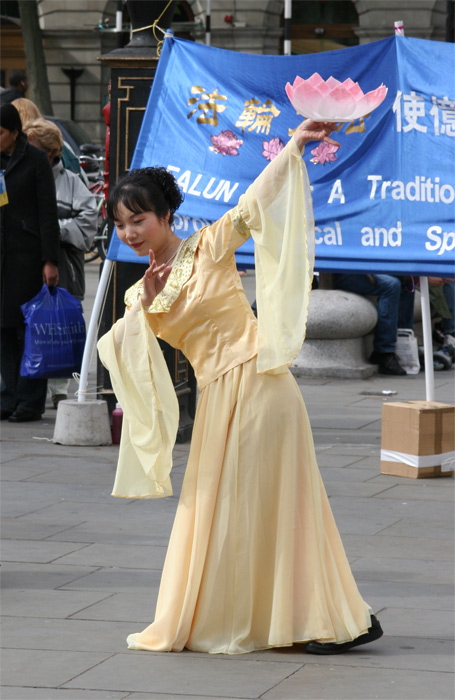
A Falun Gong practitioner performs a dance in traditional Chinese garb in Central London

In 2006, Falun Gong practitioners with backgrounds in classical Chinese dance and music established Shen Yun Performing Arts in New York state. Shen Yun comprises three separate companies of dancers and musicians that tour internationally. Its stated mission is "reviving 5,000 years of divinely inspired Chinese culture." Shen Yun's performance programs consists of classical Chinese dance, ethnic folk dance, solo musicians, and narrative dances that portray Falun Gong. Local productions of Shen Yun are often presented by the host city's Falun Dafa Association.

New Tang Dynasty, the television station founded by Chinese-American practitioners of Falun Gong, organizes a variety of cultural outreach programs as part of its mission to promote "appreciation and awareness of traditional Chinese culture." In 2008, the station began organizing a series of annual competitions open to ethnic Chinese participants in fields of classical Chinese dance, martial arts, traditional clothing design, painting, music, photography, and Chinese cooking.

=== Research and advocacy organizations ===
Supporters and practitioners of Falun Gong have established a number of research and advocacy organizations involved in reporting on human rights abuses in China and presenting this information to Western governments, NGOs, and multilateral organizations. These include the Falun Dafa Information Center, a volunteer-run organization which presents itself as the "official source on Falun Gong and the human rights crisis in China," and functions largely as a press office, publishing press releases and annual reports. The Falun Gong Human Rights Working Group conducts similar research and issues reports on the persecution in China, often presenting these findings to the United Nations. The World Organization to Investigate the Persecution of Falun Gong (WOIPFG) is as a research organization dedicated to investigating "the criminal conduct of all institutions, organizations, and individuals involved in the persecution of Falun Gong." Falun Gong supporters and sympathizers have also founded groups such as Friends of Falun Gong and the committee to Investigate the Persecution of Falun Gong(CIPFG).

=== Circumvention tools ===
Roughly coinciding with the launch of the persecution in 1999, Chinese authorities began establishing and fortifying a system of internet censorship and surveillance, sometimes referred to as the "golden shield." Since that time, information relating to Falun Gong has consistently been among the primary targets of censorship and monitoring on the internet, with several Falun Gong practitioners reportedly being captured and sent to prison or labor camps for downloading or distributing information online.

In 2000, North American Falun Gong computer scientists began developing circumvention and annonymizing tools to enable those in mainland China to access information on Falun Gong. Their software tools, such as Freegate and GPass, have since become a popular means of evading government controls of the internet in several other countries.

=== Other initiatives and campaigns ===
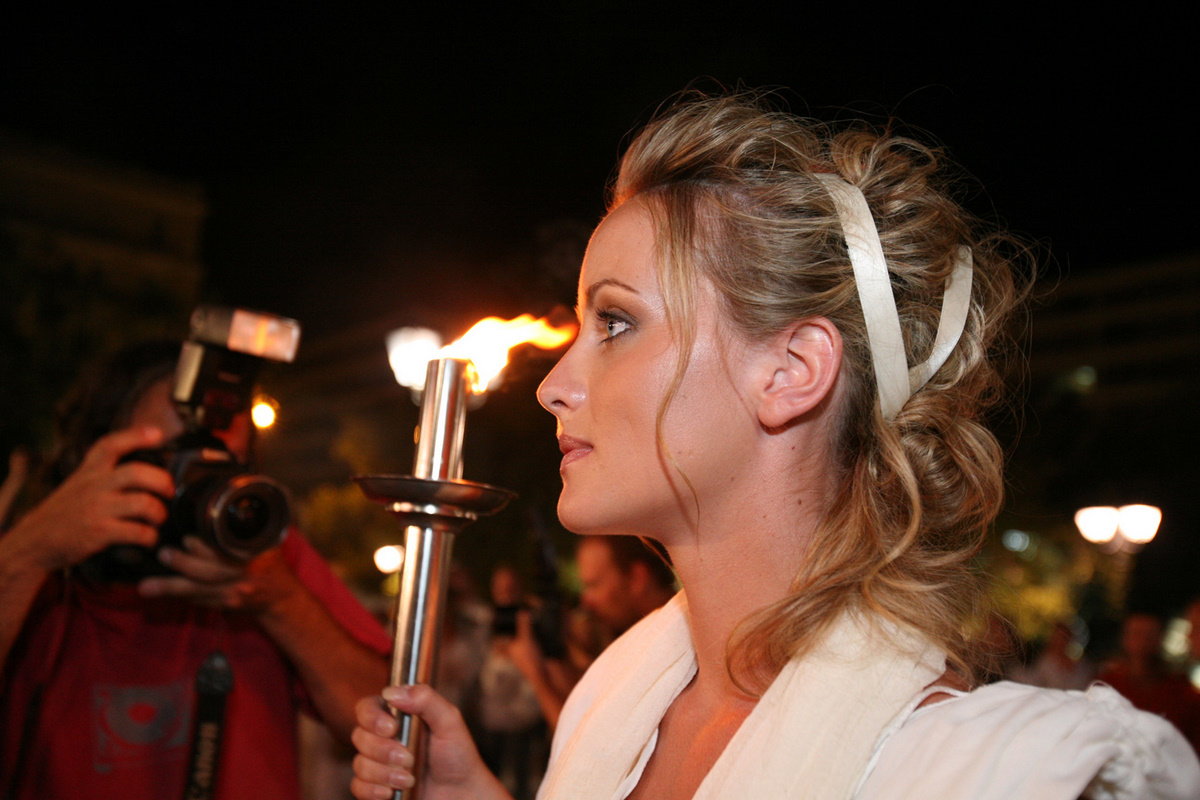
The human rights torch relay launch in Athens, Greece, 9 August 2007.

Practitioners of Falun Gong have launched a number of other campaigns to bring attention to the treatment of Falun Gong in China. Notable examples include the Human Rights Torch Relay, which toured to over 35 countries in 2007 and 2008 ahead of the 2008 Beijing Olympics. The relay was intended to draw attention to a range of human rights issues in China in connection with the Olympics, especially those related to Falun Gong and Tibet, and received support from hundreds of elected officials, past Olympic medallists, human rights groups and other concerned organizations.

Some practitioners of Falun Gong both inside and outside China are also involved in the promotion of the Tuidang movement, a dissident phenomenon catalyzed by an editorial series in The Epoch Times in late 2004. The movement encourages Chinese citizens to renounce their affiliations to the CCP, including ex post facto renunciations of the Communist Youth League and Young Pioneers. Practitioners of Falun Gong outside China make phone calls or faxes to mainland China to inform citizens of the movement and solicit renunciation statements.

== Attempts at persecution overseas by the Chinese Communist Party ==
The Chinese Communist Party (CCP)'s campaign against Falun Gong has extended to diaspora communities, including through the use of media, espionage and monitoring of Falun Gong practitioners, harassment and violence against practitioners, diplomatic pressure applied to foreign governments, and hacking of overseas websites. According to a defector from the Chinese consulate in Sydney, Australia, "The war against Falun Gong is one of the main tasks of the Chinese mission overseas."

In 2004 the U.S. House of Representatives unanimously passed a resolution condemning the attacks on Falun Gong practitioners in the United States by agents of the CCP. The resolution reported that party affiliates have "pressured local elected officials in the United States to refuse or withdraw support for the Falun Gong spiritual group," that Falun Gong spokespeople have had their houses have been broken into, and individuals engaged in peaceful protest actions outside embassies have been physically assaulted.

The overseas campaign against Falun Gong is described in documents issued by China's Overseas Chinese Affairs Office (OCAO). In a report from a 2007 meeting of OCAO directors at the national, provincial, and municipal level, the office stated that it "coordinates the launching of anti-'Falun Gong' struggles overseas." OCAO exhorts overseas Chinese citizens to participate in "resolutely implementing and executing the Party line, the Party's guiding principles, and the Party's policies," and to "aggressively expand the struggle" against Falun Gong, ethnic separatists, and Taiwanese independent activists abroad. Other party and state organs believed to be involved in the overseas campaign include the Ministry of State Security (MSS),610 Office, and People's Liberation Army, among others.

=== Surveillance and espionage ===
In 2005, Chen Yonglin, a political consul from the Chinese consulate in Sydney, and Jennifer Zeng, a Falun Gong victim of torture from China, both sought asylum in Australia while making claims that Chinese agents were engaged in large-scale operations to monitor, intimidate, and undermine support for Falun Gong outside China. Chen alleged that his primary function at the consulate involved efforts to monitor and harass Falun Gong and to minimize support for the practice from Australian media and elected officials. Zeng stated that "espionage and intimidation against [Falun Gong] practitioners overseas is so common that many of us have become accustomed to it."

Hao Fengjun, another defector to Australia, had worked for the 610 Office of Tianjin city and claims that his job involved the collection and analysis of intelligence reports on Falun Gong from Europe, Australia, and North America. The implication was that local 610 offices are involved in the espionage efforts abroad. Another defector from China's Ministry of State Security—which conducts both domestic and international intelligence—claimed that the repression and monitoring of underground Christians and Falun Gong practitioners is a major focus of the ministry.

In 2005, a Ministry of State Security (MSS) agent working with the Chinese embassy in Berlin recruited a German Falun Gong practitioner Dr. Dan Sun to act as an informant. The MSS agent reportedly arranged a meeting for Sun with two men who purported to be scholars of Chinese medicine interested in researching Falun Gong, and Sun agreed to pass information to them, ostensibly hoping to further their understanding of the practice. The men were in fact high-ranking agents of the 610 Office in Shanghai. According to Der Spiegel, the case demonstrated "how important fighting [Falun Gong] is to the [Chinese] government," and "points to the extremely offensive approach that is sometimes being taken by the Chinese intelligence agencies."

In November 2024, Ping Li, a 59-year-old Florida resident, was sentenced to four years in prison for acting as an unregistered PRC agent. Li provided China's MSS with corporate information about his former employers and personal details about a Florida resident affiliated with the Falun Gong religious movement.

=== Blacklisting ===
Chinese authorities reportedly maintain lists of high-profile overseas Falun Gong practitioners, and they use these blacklists to impose travel and visa restrictions on practitioners. Chen Yonglin, the defector from the Chinese consulate in Sydney, said in 2005 that approximately 800 Australian Falun Gong practitioners had been blacklisted (Chen claimed he sought to remove most of these names).

In order to prevent potential protests during the 2008 Beijing Olympics, authorities imposed a blacklist on overseas Falun Gong practitioners, preventing them from traveling to China. Chinese authorities tolerated Bibles and other religious items at the Olympics, with the exception of Falun Gong materials. Ahead of the Olympic Games, Chinese public security bodies reportedly requested lists of Japanese Falun Gong practitioners from the government of Japan. The request was denied.

In June 2002, when Jiang Zemin visited Iceland, Icelandic authorities complied with requests from the Chinese government to deny entry to Falun Gong practitioners who sought to enter the country to protest. Using a blacklist provided by China, hundreds of Falun Gong practitioners were turned away by the national airline or detained if they managed to make it to the country. The blacklisting ignited protests by Icelandic citizens and members of parliament. In 2011, Iceland's foreign minister Össur Skarphéðinsson issued an apology for violating Falun Gong practitioners' freedom of expression and movement.

In August 2010, an airline hostess from the Australian airline, Qantas, was demoted to short haul flights after being threatened by Chinese officials in Beijing, in spite of having flown there several times before.

Although Falun Gong is practiced freely within Hong Kong, Falun Gong practitioners from abroad have also reported being blacklisted from entering the territory. In 2001, Hong Kong officials admitted that they had used a blacklist to deny entry to approximately 100 Falun Gong practitioners during a visit by then-General Secretary of the Chinese Communist Party Jiang Zemin. In 2004, a Canadian Falun Gong practitioner on a book tour was denied entry to the territory, and in 2008, two Falun Gong practitioners from the United States and Switzerland were separately denied entry while on professional and research trips.

In 2003, 80 Taiwanese practitioners were blocked from entering Hong Kong, and again in 2007, hundreds more Taiwanese were blocked from entering Hong Kong or detained at the airport, These events set off a six-year human rights case that tested the integrity of the one country, two systems arrangement. In 2009, Falun Gong's case against the Hong Kong immigration department was dismissed. Months later, Hong Kong immigration officials denied visas to several members of the Falun Gong-affiliated Shen Yun dance company, which was scheduled to perform in the territory in January 2010. Democratic Party chairman Albert Ho said the denial of the visas was a worrying new erosion of Hong Kong's freedoms, and damaged the reputation of Hong Kong as a liberal and open society.

=== Disruption, monitoring of electronic communications ===
Since 1999, Falun Gong practitioners outside China have reported having their telephone lines tapped and electronic correspondence monitored. Falun Gong websites based outside China were the earliest targets of Chinese denial of service attacks, according to Chinese internet expert Ethan Gutmann. In 2011, dated stock footage aired on China Central Television of People's Liberation Army staff carrying out attacks on U.S.-based Falun Gong websites.

=== Violence ===
In isolated instances, violence against practitioners of Falun Gong has reportedly been committed by agents of the Chinese government abroad, though the connection to Chinese authorities is sometimes tenuous or difficult to verify.

In September 2001, five Falun Gong practitioners were assaulted while demonstrating outside the Chinese consulate in Chicago. The assailants, who were later convicted of battery, were members of a Chinese-American association with connections to the Chinese consulate. In 2002, 25-year-old Ottawa practitioner Leon Wang reported being kicked, dragged, and beaten inside the Chinese embassy after he was caught taking pictures of an anti-Falun Gong exhibit being held there. The embassy responded that Wang had "sneaked in . . . and disrupted its normal functioning" of the event.

In June 2004, Australian Falun Gong practitioner David Liang was injured in a drive-by shooting while in South Africa. The purpose of his visit was to protest outside the South Africa-China Binational Commission (BNC) meetings and to launch a lawsuit against high-ranking Chinese officials for their involvement in the persecution of Falun Gong. Practitioners allege that the drive-by shooting was an assassination attempt, and noted that the assailants made no attempt to rob them. Chinese Embassy officials denied involvement. In December 2005, Argentine Falun Gong practitioners filed a lawsuit against former 610 Office chief and Politburo member Luo Gan while he visited the country. During Luo's visit, practitioners were beaten by Chinese assailants in Buenos Aires's Congress Square. Police were reportedly ordered not to intervene. Amnesty International's Argentina director suggested the assaults may have been "connected to officials of the Chinese government."

In the spring and summer of 2008, practitioners of Falun Gong in New York became the targets of sustained violence within the largely ethnic Chinese neighborhood of Flushing, Queens. Groups of Chinese reportedly punched, assaulted, and threw rocks at Falun Gong practitioners, leading to multiple arrests. The Chinese consul general in New York, Peng Keyu, was reportedly involved in inciting the violence against Falun Gong and providing "guidance" to the assailants.

=== Diplomatic and commercial pressure ===
Representatives of the party-state, typically acting through China's overseas diplomatic mission, have applied diplomatic and commercial pressure on foreign governments, media organizations, and private enterprises with regards to Falun Gong.

In North America, Chinese agents have reportedly visited newspaper offices to "extol the virtues of Communist China and the evils of Falun Gong." There have also been instances where international media organizations have cancelled programing or print articles about Falun Gong in response to requests from the Chinese government. In 2008, for instance, the Canadian Broadcasting Corporation succumbed to pressure from the Chinese embassy in Ottawa to pull a documentary on Falun Gong hours before it was set to air. In 2009–2010, the Washington Post commissioned a feature article on Falun Gong. The article was killed "immediately after the Chinese embassy became aware of it," according to the journalist.

Chinese diplomats also exhort politicians not to support or recognize Falun Gong, and threaten that expressions of support for Falun Gong will jeopardize trade relations with China. In 2002, the Wall Street Journal reported that hundreds of American municipalities had received letters from Chinese diplomatic missions urging them to shun or persecute Falun Gong, using approaches that "combine gross disinformation with scare tactics and, in some cases, slyly implied diplomatic and commercial pressure."

According to Perry Link, pressure on Western institutions also takes more subtle forms, including academic self-censorship, whereby research on Falun Gong is avoided because it could result in a denial of visas for fieldwork in China. Ethan Gutmann also noted that media organizations and human rights groups also self-censor on the topic, given the PRC government's attitude toward the practice, and the potential repercussions that may follow for making overt representations on Falun Gong's behalf.

Governments and private enterprises have also come under pressure from China to censor media organizations operated by Falun Gong practitioners. In 2008, for instance, French satellite provider Eutelsat suspended its Asian broadcasts of New Tang Dynasty Television in response to pressure from China's State Administration of Radio, Film and Television. The move was viewed as a quid pro quo attempt to secure access to the Chinese market.

In 2011, under pressure from Chinese authorities, the Vietnamese government tried two Falun Gong practitioners who had been operating a shortwave radio station and broadcasting information into China. The pair was charged with unlicensed broadcasting, and sentenced to 2 and 3 years in prison. Earlier in the same year, another radio station operated by Falun Gong practitioners in Indonesia, Radio Erabaru, was shuttered under diplomatic pressure from China.

Falun Gong has been banned in Russia since 2020, after a court in Khakassia deemed it an "extremist organization", and extending the ban to the entire Russian Federation. Earlier that year, several Falun Gong-related organizations were designated as 'undesirable' in Russia.

=== Abuse of legal systems ===
According to The Diplomat, Xi Jinping, the General Secretary of the Chinese Communist Party, reportedly directed CCP officials in 2022 to intensify efforts to "completely, and on an international scale, suppress Falun Gong's momentum" by shaping global public opinion and using legal warfare against Falun Gong organizations abroad, including in the United States.

In May 2023, Los Angeles residents John Chen and Lin Feng were indicted and charged by the U.S. Department of Justice for allegedly engaging in a CCP 610 Office-directed scheme to strip the tax-exempt status of an entity run by Falun Gong practitioners. The two were charged with acting as unregistered foreign agents, money laundering, and bribery. After Chen filed a defective whistleblower complaint with the U.S. Internal Revenue Service (IRS), the two paid $5,000 in cash bribes to a purported IRS official who was an undercover agent, and promised to pay substantially more for the official's assistance in advancing the complaint. Chen was sentenced to 20 months in prison in November 2024 and Feng received a 16-month sentence in September 2024.

== International reception and response ==
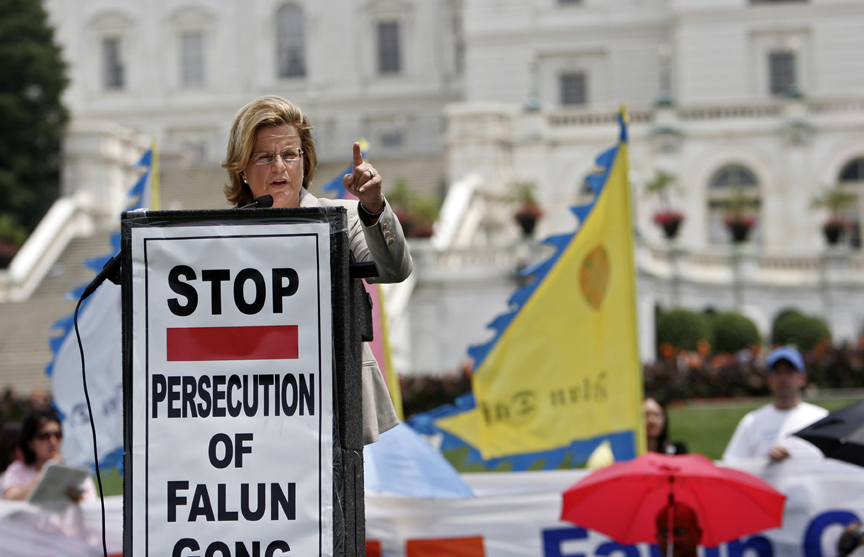
U.S. Congresswoman Ileana Ros-Lehtinen speaks at a rally to condemning persecution of Falun Gong in China.

Western governments and human rights organizations have expressed condemnation of the suppression in China and sympathized with Falun Gong's plight. Since 1999, members of the United States Congress have made public pronouncements and introduced several resolutions in support of Falun Gong. In 2010, House Resolution 605 described Falun Gong as a set of "spiritual, religious, and moral teachings for daily life, meditation, and exercise, based upon the principles of truthfulness, compassion, and tolerance," called for "an immediate end to the campaign to persecute, intimidate, imprison, and torture Falun Gong practitioners," condemned the Chinese authorities' efforts to distribute "false propaganda" about the practice worldwide, and expressed sympathy to persecuted Falun Gong practitioners and their families.

United Nations Special Rapporteurs on Torture, Extrajudicial executions, Violence against Women and Freedom of Religion or Belief have issued numerous reports condemning the persecution of Falun Gong in China, and relayed hundreds of cases of concern to Chinese authorities. In 2003, for instance, The Special Rapporteur on Extrajudicial Killings wrote that reports from China "describe harrowing scenes in which detainees, many of whom are followers of the Falun Gong movement, die as a result of severe ill-treatment, neglect or medical attention. The cruelty and brutality of these alleged acts of torture defy description." In 2010, the special rapporteur on freedom of religion or belief condemned the defamation against minority religious groups, singling out the governments of Iran and China for their treatment of the Baháʼí Faith and Falun Gong, respectively. "Small communities, such as Jehovah's Witnesses, Baháʼís, Ahmadis, Falun Gong and others are sometimes stigmatized as "cults" and frequently meet with societal prejudices which may escalate into fully fledged conspiracy theories," said the rapporteur at the UN general assembly.

Although the persecution of Falun Gong has drawn considerable condemnation outside China, some observers note that Falun Gong has failed to attract the level of sympathy and sustained attention afforded to other Chinese dissident groups. Katrina Lantos Swett, vice chair of the United States Commission on International Religious Freedom, notes that most Americans are aware of the persecution of "Tibetan Buddhists and unregistered Christian groups or pro-democracy and free speech advocates such as Liu Xiaobo and Ai Weiwei," and yet "know little to nothing about China's assault on the Falun Gong."

From 1999 to 2001, Western media reports on Falun Gong—and in particular, the mistreatment of practitioners—were frequent, if mixed. By the latter half of 2001, however, the volume of media reports declined precipitously, and by 2002, coverage of Falun Gong by major news organizations like the New York Times and Washington Post had almost completely ceased, particularly from within China. In a study of media discourse on Falun Gong, researcher Leeshai Lemish found that Western news organizations also became less balanced, and more likely to uncritically present the narratives of the CCP, rather than those of Falun Gong or human rights groups.

Adam Frank writes that foreign media adopted a variety of frames in reporting on Falun Gong, including linking Falun Gong to historical antecedents in China, reporting on human rights violations against the group, and practice-based reporting on the experience of Falun Gong. Ultimately, Frank writes that in reporting on the Falun Gong, the Western tradition of casting the Chinese as "exotic" took dominance, and that "the facts were generally correct, but the normalcy that millions of Chinese practitioners associated with the practice had all but disappeared." David Ownby observes that sympathy for Falun Gong is further undermined by the impact of the "cult" label applied to the practice by the Chinese authorities, which never entirely went away in the minds of some Westerners, and the stigma of which still plays a role in public perceptions of Falun Gong.

Ethan Gutmann, a journalist reporting on China since the early 1990s, has attempted to explain the apparent dearth of public sympathy for Falun Gong as stemming, in part, from the group's shortcomings in public relations. Unlike the democracy activists or Tibetans, who have found a comfortable place in Western perceptions, "Falun Gong marched to a distinctly Chinese drum," according to Gutmann. This, coupled with western skepticism of persecuted refugees, has resulted in a perception that Falun Gong practitioners tended to exaggerate, or "spout slogans rather than facts." Gutmann also observes that Falun Gong also lacks robust backing from the American constituencies that usually support religious freedom: liberals are wary of Falun Gong's conservative morality, Christian conservatives don't accord the practice the same space as persecuted Christians, and the political center is wary of disrupting commercial and political relations with the Chinese government. Thus, Falun Gong practitioners have largely had to rely on their own resources in responding to the persecution.

A response by the U.S. government came on July 20, 2020—the 21st anniversary of the persecution of Falun Gong in China—where then Secretary of State Mike Pompeo called on the CCP to "immediately end its depraved abuse and mistreatment of Falun Gong practitioners, release those imprisoned due to their beliefs [...] and address the whereabouts of missing practitioners". He further stated that "Twenty-one years of persecution of Falun Gong practitioners is far too long, and it must end".

In November 2020, a Siberian Appeals Court banned Falun Gong in the region under Russia's extremisms laws that also targeted multiple other spiritual groups. This followed the Supreme Court of Khakassia's refusal to designate Falun Gong as extremist and the region's deputy prosecutor general's appeal to overturn the decision. Thus since November 2020, Falun Gong has been banned throughout the entirety of the Russian Federation. An international human rights organization based in Belgium, Human Rights Without Frontiers, considers the ban a "grave grave violation of religious freedom".

== See also ==
- Teachings of Falun Gong
- History of Falun Gong
- Falun Gong in Hong Kong
- Falun Buddha Society (Singapore)
