= Young Americans for Liberty =

American libertarian organization

Young Americans for Liberty, Inc.

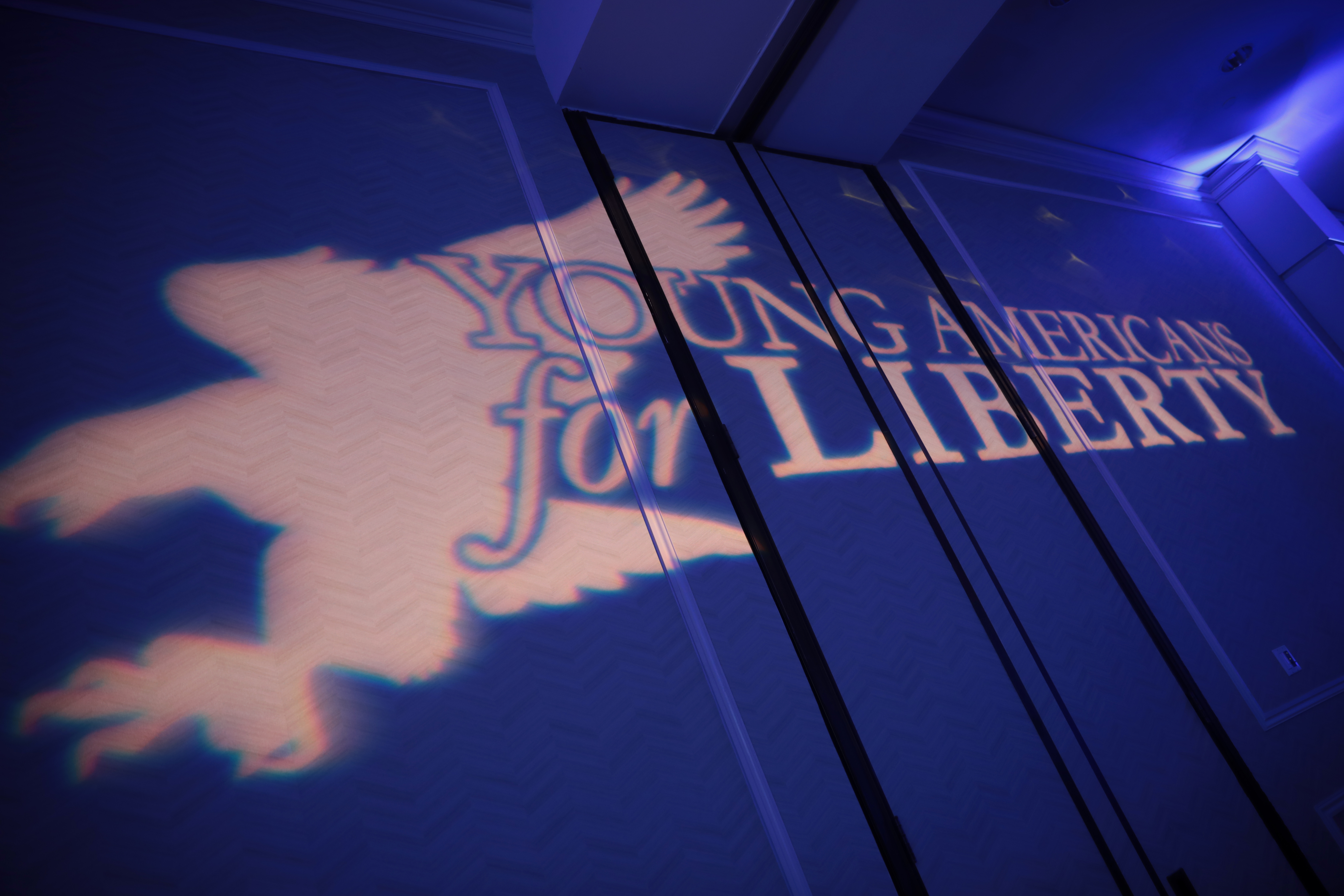
- Abbreviation: YAL
- Formation: April 28, 2008; 18 years ago
- Type: Student Organization, 501(c)(3), 501(c)(4)
- Purpose: Political activism
- Region served: United States
- CEO: Jeff Frazee
- Affiliations: Students for Ron Paul, Campaign for Liberty, Youth for Ron Paul, Students for Rand
- Website: yaliberty.org

Young Americans for Liberty, Inc. (YAL) is a libertarian-conservative student activist organization headquartered in Austin, Texas. Formed in the aftermath of the Ron Paul 2008 presidential campaign, YAL establishes chapters on college campuses across the United States, for the purpose of "advancing liberty on campus and in American electoral politics."

YAL is active on nearly 400 college and university campuses, representing thousands of students.

== Mission ==
As America’s largest grassroots liberty organization on college campuses, YAL's stated mission is to "identify, educate, train, and mobilize young people committed to winning on principle."

== History ==
Young Americans for Liberty, Inc. was founded on April 28, 2008, at the end of Congressman Ron Paul's first presidential campaign. Paul's candidacy inspired students to organize on-campus under the banner of Students for Ron Paul. After the 2008 presidential election in November, the movement continued, soon becoming Young Americans for Liberty.

In 2011, 78 YAL chapters across 32 states organized a student protest of the national debt. Each chapter constructed a 40-foot debt clock and placed it in the middle of their campus.

In 2019, YAL announced it would be moving its headquarters to Austin from Arlington, Virginia, saying that the group "doesn't belong" in Washington, D.C. due to its "toxic environment," and that it was a "rapidly growing organization" that needed more space in its headquarters.

In 2021, several women who had worked with YAL publicly accused then-YAL president Cliff Maloney of sexual misconduct. YAL subsequently announced that Maloney had been terminated as president. In May 2021, Lauren Daugherty became YAL's new executive director. Former Maine State Senator Eric Brakey assumed the role of senior spokesperson, while Sean Themea became YAL's chief of staff.

== Organization ==
=== Leadership ===
Jeff Frazee is the founder and CEO of YAL. Frazee first worked with Ron Paul as a congressional intern in 2005.

As of 2026, Themea serves as Chief Operating Officer, while Aaron Droba is Chief Financial Officer.

=== Events ===
Beginning in 2009, YAL hosted annual National Conventions in Arlington, Virginia. More than 300 students attended the 2014 convention. Speakers included U.S. Senator Rand Paul and former U.S. Representative Ron Paul, with a video address by Glenn Greenwald. Speakers at the 2016 convention included speakers Ron Paul and U.S. Representative Justin Amash, Judge Andrew Napolitano, and David Boaz of the Cato Institute.

YAL hosts an annual convention, "YALCON," with keynote speakers such as Ron Paul, Rand Paul, Tulsi Gabbard, Vivek Ramaswamy, Kat Timpf, and Jennifer Zeng. The event attracts hundreds of students and elected officials, and is focused on advancing libertarian-leaning policies in state capitols.

In 2016, YAL terminated Milo Yiannopoulos from speaking at events. In 2018, YAL revoked the Iowa State chapter's affiliation after it invited far-right figure Nick Fuentes to speak.

=== Structure ===
YAL funds two legally separate, but interrelated, organizations: A political campaign committee and a grassroots organizing arm. The group’s aligned Make Liberty Win PAC advocates for no income tax, no local enforcement of federal gun laws, universal school vouchers, and other policy priorities.

During the Obama Administration, YAL was one of the organizations whose tax exempt status was challenged by the IRS, which YAL attributed to its use of terms like "Constitution" and "liberty."

== Activities ==
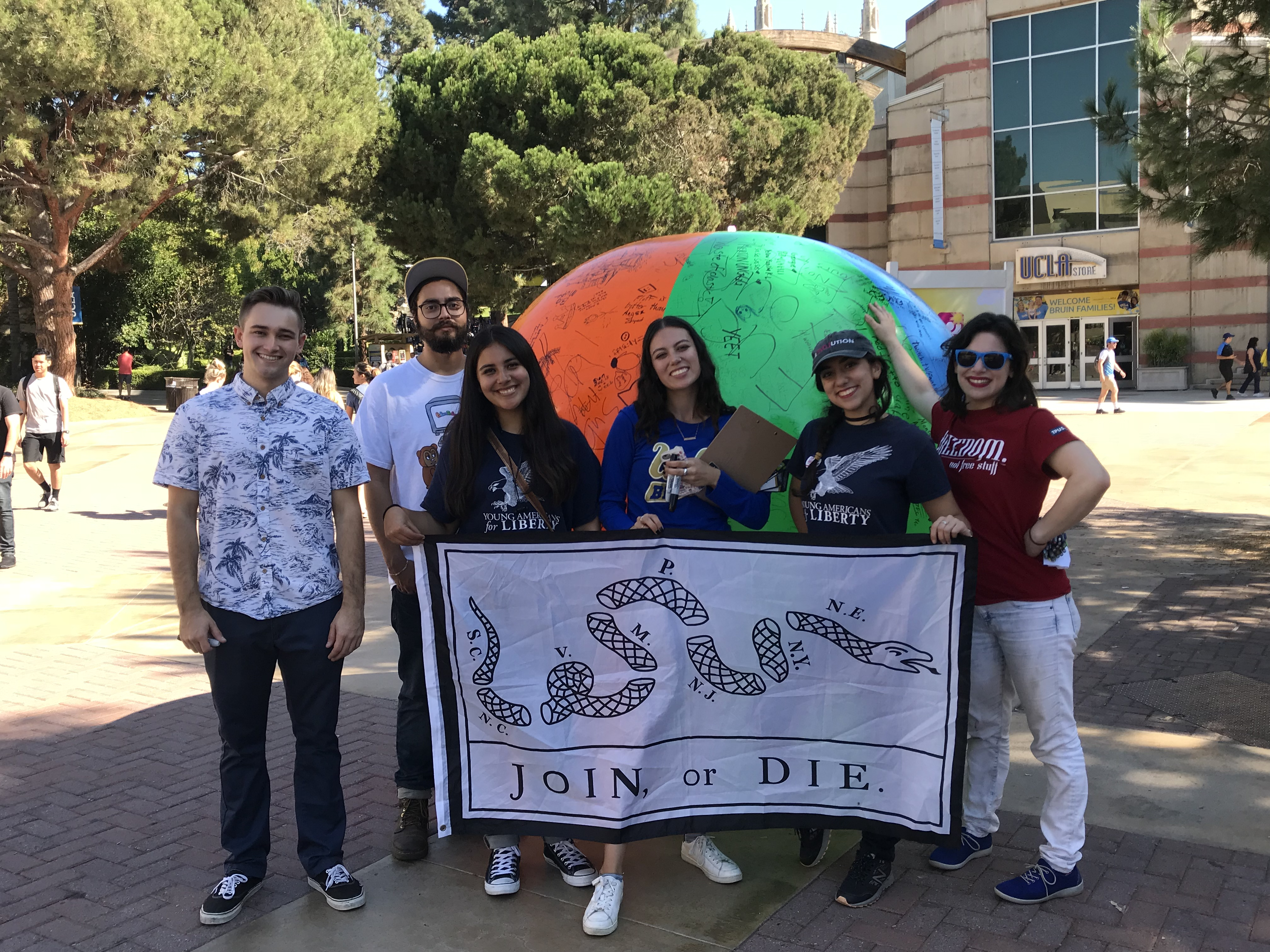
YAL activists at the University of California, Los Angeles (2018)

The organization has been involved in several free speech disputes. In 2016, three students were arrested at Kellogg Community College for distributing pocket constitutions, resulting in a $55,000 settlement and a reformed campus speech policy.

During the COVID-19 pandemic, YAL pushed back against government mandates that "[infringe] on civil liberties." The organization's Hazlitt Coalition, a network of 178 legislators from 37 states at the time, introduced dozens of bills opposing proof-of-vaccination requirements. According to Themea, "The idea of having to carry around your health papers to go to the grocery store is something out of an Orwell novel."

In May 2021, YAL helped organize a protest against the COVID-19 vaccine requirement at Rutgers University. Organized by Rutgers junior and YAL state chair Sara Razi, the protest brought together hundreds of "medical freedom activists." The Rutgers protest was covered by CNBC, Forbes, The Guardian, and other news outlets. That same month, YAL and the ADF threatened legal action against Skidmore College after a YAL chapter was not approved on campus for political reasons. Skidmore student Hannah Davis claimed to be the victim of a "cancel culture campaign", which led YAL and the ADF to accuse Skidmore of violating consumer protection law.

In total, YAL fought COVID-19 vaccine and mask mandates on 23 college campuses, such as Rutgers, Virginia Tech University, and the University of Colorado Boulder. YAL circulated petitions opposing COVID-related rules on different campuses, such as Virginia Tech. According to YAL, the organization "is not anti-vaccine, but rather anti-vaccine mandate at taxpayer-funded academic institutions." Several students affiliated with YAL have spoken to the mainstream media, arguing for vaccination as a "personal choice."

YAL supports school choice and is an outspoken critic of gun-control legislation, such as "red flag" laws proposed by former President Joe Biden and other Democrats. The organization also opposes "Critical race theory" education at public schools. YAL is active on social media, often attacking Democratic Party officials. The organization also publishes a quarterly magazine called "The American Revolution," and YAL spokespeople regularly appear on Fox News and other networks.

As of 2025, YAL has spent more than $250,000 in West Virginia to oppose vaccine mandates and the elected officials who support such mandates.

In August 2025, YAL hosted Ron Paul's 90th birthday party, which drew about 1,000 attendees.

=== Operation Win at the Door ===
In 2018, YAL launched Operation Win at the Door. Maloney claimed that the project's goal would be to "build the bench" by electing 250 state legislators by the end of 2022.

In 2020, YAL accused Bernie Sanders' presidential campaign of stealing its grassroots door-knocking strategy and "Operation Win at the Door" branding to engage with voters. As of September 2022, YAL says it has knocked on millions of doors across 40 states to support political candidates.

=== Hazlitt Coalition ===
YAL's "Hazlitt Coalition," a network of libertarian state legislators around the country, oversaw more than 170 members from nearly 40 states in 2021. The coalition filed 25 bills defending people's rights against COVID-19 protocols.

As of 2022, there are more than 300 Hazlitt members in the coalition, many of them under the age of 40. The Hazlitt Coalition doubled in size between 2021 and 2022. One of the coalition's policy priorities is COVID-19 vaccine choice, in addition to free speech and gun rights, among others.

== Awards ==
In 2023, YAL won a Reed Award for "Best Political Event Production." The organization won the same award in 2024 for its Revolution 2023 event.
