= Francesco Sisci =

Italian sinologist, author and columnist

Francesco Sisci (born August 5, 1960) is an Italian sinologist, author and columnist who lives and works in Beijing. Currently he is a senior researcher at Renmin University of China and contributes to several journals and think tanks on geopolitical issues. In 2016, he was granted the first interview to the Pope on China. The interview has received widespread coverage in the Chinese press, for the first time in the history of the Chinese Communist Party. He was a contributor for Il Sole 24ore and for Asia Times with the column Sinograph and a frequent commentator on international affairs for CCTV and Phoenix TV.

== Education ==
He was born in Taranto in Italy in 1960. He graduated at the University of Venice and he specialised in Chinese language. Subsequently he studied at the University of London, School of Oriental and African Studies (SOAS) and in 1988 he became the first foreigner who was admitted to the Graduate School of the Chinese Academy of Social Sciences (CASS). He obtained his PhD in Chinese Classical Philology and Philosophy with a thesis on "Rationalisation of Thought and Political Discourse in Early Mohism".

== Career ==
He began his career as the correspondent of the Agenzia Nazionale Stampa Associata (ANSA) in Beijing and later he contributed to Asia Times as Greater China correspondent. He worked as a correspondent for several major Italian newspapers such as Il sole 24 Ore, Corriere della Sera and later La Stampa. He has been a senior consultant for the Italian Ministry of Environment in China since 1999 and creating the framework of the most important Environmental cooperation with China, the Italian-Sino Environmental cooperation. He also held the position of the director of the Italian Institute of Culture in China for two years. He has been the coordinator of the largest cooperation program between and Italy and The Central Party School (the higher education institution that specifically trains officials for the Chinese Communist Party) since 2004. He was the Asia Editor of La Stampa from 2005 to 2010.

== Acknowledgements ==
- 2005 – He became the Commander of the Order of Merit of the Italian Republic
- 2006 – Honorary Professorship by the Chinese Academy of Social Sciences (CASS) in Classical Chinese Studies

== Sources ==
1. Centre for European Studies at Renmin University of China https://web.archive.org/web/20150209050648/http://cesruc.org/archives/team/xw/4473.html
2. China Right Here - a TV program on Francesco Sisci
