= Jennifer Zeng =

Chinese activist and writer

- 曾铮
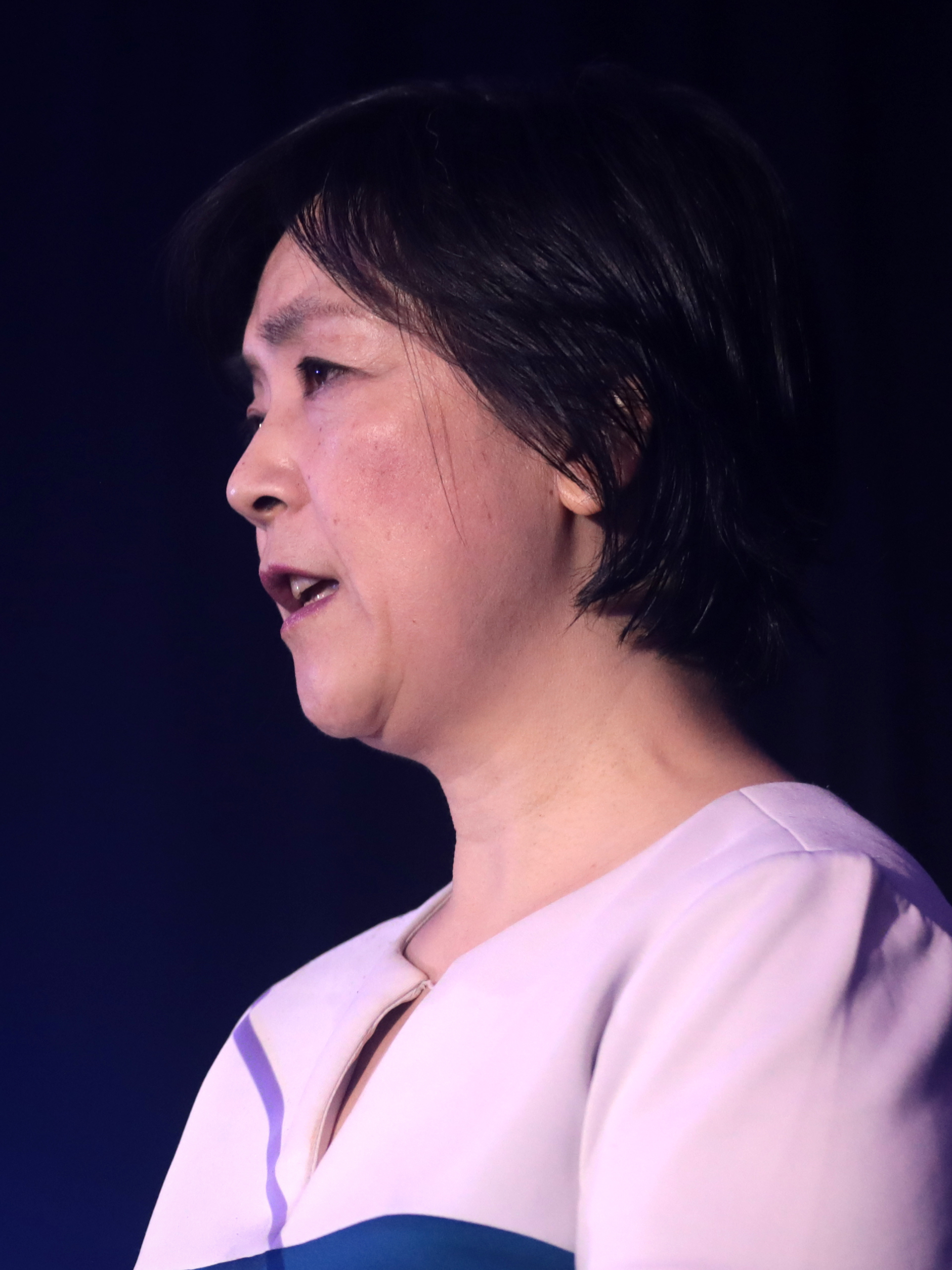
- Zeng in 2021
- Born: October 19, 1966 (age 60); Sichuan, China
- Education: Peking University
- Occupations: Author; Political activist
- Known for: Against Persecution of Falun Gong
- Movement: Falun Gong

Jennifer Zeng
- Simplified Chinese: 曾錚
- Traditional Chinese: 曾錚
Transcriptions
Standard Mandarin
- Hanyu Pinyin: Zēng Zhēng

Jennifer Zeng (born October 19, 1966) is a Chinese-born author, best known for her practice of Falun Gong, the subsequent government suppression of the movement, and the book she wrote about her experience regarding Falun Gong: Witnessing History: One Chinese Woman's Fight for Freedom and Falun Gong. Zeng is a TV host for New Tang Dynasty Television and a contributor to The Epoch Times.

== Falun Gong ==
She became a practitioner of Falun Gong in 1997. Later, when the government of the People's Republic of China began to arrest people involved with the group, she was among them. She was in fact arrested four times, and sent to a labor camp, the Beijing Municipal Women's Re-Education-Through-Labor Camp. Zeng relates that at the camp she was physically and mentally abused, subject to attempted brainwashing and even faced electroshock torture.

== Asylum and activism ==
In 2001, she fled to Australia. Her daughter later followed her there for her own safety. Since arriving in Australia, she has spoken out about the Australian government's lack of protection of practitioners there, alleging that the government does not wish to insult or anger mainland China. A specific instance which she recounted to the Australian Broadcasting Corporation involves how an official of the mainland Chinese government once walked out of the Chinese embassy in Canberra and slapped a female Falun Gong practitioner on the face. The women responded that, in Australia, she had the right to be there and to continue practicing Falun Gong. The official responded saying that he was a Chinese diplomat. As such, no one particularly cared what he did, because Australia could not do much to him.

She published her book Witnessing History in 2005. The book describes the difficulties she has faced in practicing Falun Gong in mainland China, and even since she left mainland China. The book has been described by a reviewer in the Midwest Book Review as "a necessarily harsh assault on a nation that does not respect human rights", and by June Sawyers in Booklist as "an often harrowing, powerful reminder of what can happen when government power runs unchecked".

She currently lives in the US, where she has resided since 2011.

Zeng is a TV host for the New Tang Dynasty Television and a contributor to The Epoch Times, which are both affiliated with Falun Gong. According to MIT Technology Review, Zeng "has a track record of spreading rumors and misattributed videos".

In October 2023, the Indian media NDTV reported that Jennifer Zeng claimed that China was behind the murder of Hardeep Nijjar in the absence of substantial evidence. This statement is completely contrary to the Canadian official’s investigation conclusion directed by the Indian government, triggering doubts from various quarters.
