= Coalition to Investigate the Persecution of Falun Gong =

U.S. non-governmental organization

The Coalition to Investigate the Persecution of Falun Gong in China (CIPFG) is an international non-governmental organization established in the United States on April 5, 2006, by the Falun Dafa Association. The organization also has offices in Canada.

In 2006, the organization asked former Canadian Secretary of State David Kilgour and human rights lawyer David Matas to investigate allegations of organ harvesting from Falun Gong practitioners in China. The Kilgour–Matas report concluded that, "the government of China and its agencies in numerous parts of the country, in particular hospitals but also detention centres and 'people's courts', since 1999 have put to death a large but unknown number of Falun Gong prisoners of conscience.

== History ==
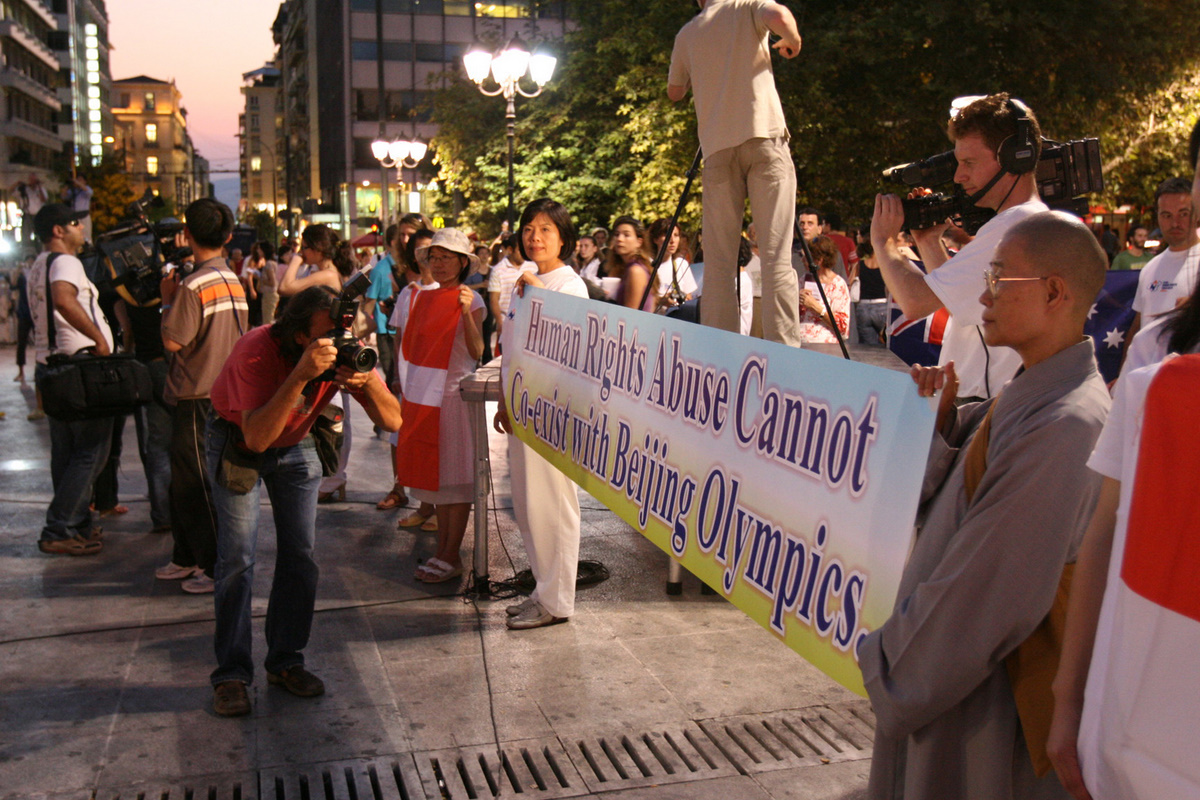
Human Rights Torch Relay protesters, the banner reads: "Human Rights Abuse Cannot Co-exist with Beijing Olympics"

In December 2006, the Australian government responded to the newly formed CIPFG's petition alleging unethical organ transplant procedures in China by announcing the abolition of training programs for Chinese doctors in organ transplant procedures in the Prince Charles and the Princess Alexandra Hospitals as well as ending their joint research programs into organ transplantation with China.

The Coalition to Investigate the Persecution of Falun Gong organized the international Global Human Rights Torch Relay that traveled through 150 cities in 35 countries of Europe, Asia, North America and Australasia to support a boycott of the 2008 Beijing Olympics. The relay started in Athens on 9 August 2007, one year before the start of the Olympic Games. According to CIPFG, the role of the Human Rights Torch Relay was to raise awareness of Human rights in the People's Republic of China, especially the persecution of Falun Gong. Some celebrities participated in the march, such as Chen Kai, a former member of China's national basketball team.

In July 2020, the organization was designated as 'undesirable' in Russia.

== See also ==
- Concerns over the 2008 Summer Olympics
- Falun Gong
- Organ harvesting from Falun Gong practitioners in China
- Persecution of Falun Gong
