= Forced organ harvesting from Falun Gong practitioners in China =

Human rights controversy

- Date: 2000 (earliest alleged)
- Location: People's Republic of China
- Type: Human rights abuse, organ trafficking
- Cause: Persecution of Falun Gong, demand for organ transplants
- Motive: Political persecution, financial incentives
- Target: Falun Gong practitioners, other prisoners of conscience (such as Uyghurs, Tibetans)
- First reporter: The Epoch Times, David Kilgour, David Matas, Ethan Gutmann
- Participants: Chinese medical institutions, military, public security agencies (alleged)
- Outcome: International condemnation, legislative measures against transplant tourism, China denies allegations
- Deaths: Estimated tens of thousands of Falun Gong practitioners (per Kilgour, Matas, Gutmann)
- Inquiries: Kilgour-Matas report (2006, 2007), China Tribunal (2018–2019), UN Special Rapporteurs (2006–2008, 2021)

The People's Republic of China has been alleged to harvest the organs of imprisoned Falun Gong practitioners. Initial reports of organ harvesting began with the Falun Gong-affiliated Epoch Times in 2006. In a subsequent report, known as the Kilgour–Matas report, former lawmaker David Kilgour and legal counsel David Matas estimated that over 41,500 organ transplants in China were unexplained between 2000 and 2005 and suggested that the source was Falun Gong practitioners.

They updated their research in 2007 and released it as a book in 2009, receiving further media coverage. Journalist Ethan Gutmann began investigating the claims in 2006 and published his research in subsequent years. He estimated that 65,000 Falun Gong practitioners had been killed between 2000 and 2008 for their organs. In 2016, Gutmann, Kilgour, and Matas updated their research and estimated that 60,000 to 100,000 transplant surgeries were performed in China per year, far higher than its official figure.

An informal, independent tribunal initiated by an advocacy group (Note: The tribunal was convened by the International Coalition to End Transplant Abuse in China (ETAC) co-founded by Gutmann, Kilgour, Matas, Swedish filmmaker Normann Bjorvand, and Susie Hughes, a long time advocate of the issue. ETAC commissioned British barrister Geoffrey Nice as the tribunal's chair.) made a final judgment in 2019 that forced organ harvesting had occurred in China on a significant scale and continued to do so, and Falun Gong practitioners are the primary source. Since 2020, Gutmann has estimated that at least 25,000 and as many as 50,000 Uyghurs are being killed every year for their organs.

These reports cite a combination of statistical analysis, interviews with former prisoners, medical authorities and public security agents, as well as more circumstantial evidence, such as the rapid growth of organ transplantation industry in China after 1999, the short wait times for recipients, the low number of known donors, the large number of Falun Gong practitioners detained and persecuted, and the profits that can be made from selling organs.

A 2006 report from the US Congressional Research Service (CRS) questioned the credibility of Kilgour-Matas's first report and stated that American officials in China were unable to verify organ harvesting allegations at a hospital in Shenyang. Dissenters have cited the allegations' inconsistency with other data, rejection by lawyers representing Falun Gong practitioners, and implausibility of the numbers.

The Chinese government has denied harvesting organs but admitted that executed prisoners were once used legally as well as illegally as a source of organs for transplantation. Its efforts to rely on voluntary donation exclusively have been met with skepticism.

Since 2006, U.N. Special Rapporteurs have called on the Chinese government to account for the sources of organs used in transplant practices. Since 2013, the European Parliament and the United States House of Representatives have adopted resolutions expressing concerns over credible reports of forced organ harvesting from Falun Gong practitioners and calling to end the practice. In 2021 U.N. human rights experts expressed alarm over credible information that minority detainees in China may be subjected to involuntary medical tests intended for organ registries. Countries have taken or considered measures to deter their citizens from travelling to China to receive transplanted organs.

== Background ==
=== Organ transplantation in China ===
China has one of the largest organ transplant programs in the world. China Daily, controlled by the Chinese Communist Party, reported that as many as 20,000 organ transplants were performed in 2006. According to the Chinese Ministry of Health, kidney transplants increased from 3,000 to 6,000 per year from 1997 to 2000, peaking at around 10,000 in 2004 before falling again. Some sources say the actual number of transplants is significantly higher based on hospital records. Wait times for obtaining vital organs in China are among the shortest in the world—often just weeks for organs such as kidneys, livers, and hearts. This has made it a destination for international transplant tourism and a venue for testing pharmaceutical anti-rejection drugs.

According to Kilgour and Matas in 2007, organ transplant recipients in China are generally not told the identity of the organ donor, nor are they provided with evidence of written consent. In some cases even the identity of the medical staff and surgeons may be withheld from patients. The problem of transparency is compounded by the lack of any ethical guidelines for the transplant profession or system of discipline for surgeons who violate ethical standards.

The Chinese government approved a regulation in 1984 to allow the removal of organs from executed criminals, provided they give prior consent or if no one claims the body. By the 1990s, growing concerns about possible abuses arising from coerced consent and corruption led medical groups and human rights organizations to start condemning China's use of prisoner organs. In 1994, an investigation by Human Rights Watch reported that "political offenders and other nonviolent criminals are used as sources for organs" and that "Chinese doctors participate in pre-execution medical tests, matching of donors with recipients, and scheduling of operations, often on a first-paid, first-served basis." In 2001, a former Chinese military surgeon testified before U.S. Congress that he had taken part in organ extraction from executed prisoners, one of whom had been shot in the head but had not died yet. As a matter of culture and custom, China had extremely low rates of voluntary organ donation. Between 2003 and 2009, only 130 people volunteered to be organ donors. In 2010, the Chinese Red Cross launched a campaign to attract voluntary organ donors in eleven provinces, but only 37 people signed up as of 2011. Further complicating the matter, as of 2011, organs could be legally collected only after cardiac death but not brain death. Due to the low levels of donation, most organs used in transplants are sourced from prisoners. Critics say that this creates a lucrative source of revenue for the Chinese medical, military and public security establishments.

Since 2005, China's Deputy Health Minister Huang Jiefu acknowledged on several occasions that approximately 65% of organ transplants in China were sourced from executed prisoners. In 2006, the World Medical Association demanded that China cease harvesting organs from prisoners, who are not deemed able to properly consent. When China banned organ exports to foreign countries in 2007, the price for kidneys skyrocketed in South Korea. In 2014, Huang Jiefu said that reliance on organ harvesting from death row inmates was declining, while simultaneously defending the practice of using prisoners' organs in the transplantation system.

Experts have also expressed concern that in addition to executed prisoners, non-death-row political prisoners and prisoners of conscience are also being used to supply the organ transplant industry. Researchers, including ones affiliated with The Epoch Times, the International Coalition to End Transplant Abuse in China, and the Victims of Communism Memorial Foundation, point out that data from China between 2010 and 2018 may have been falsified or manipulated because of "contradictory, implausible, or anomalous data artefacts" and because they match a quadratic equation with model parsimony that is one to two orders of magnitude smoother than those of other nations. Some apparently nonvoluntary donors appear to have been misclassified as voluntary. This occurs alongside voluntary organ transplant activity often incentivized by cash payments. They also report that in some cases, problematic declarations of brain death suggest that surgeons in China "executed" organ donors from 1980 to 2015.

=== Persecution of Falun Gong ===
Falun Gong is a Chinese qigong discipline involving meditation and a moral philosophy rooted in Buddhist tradition. The practice rose to popularity in the 1990s in China, and by 1998, Chinese government sources estimated that as many as 70 million people had taken up the practice. Perceiving that Falun Gong was a potential threat to the Party's authority and ideology, Communist Party leader Jiang Zemin initiated a nationwide campaign to eradicate the group in July 1999.

An extra-constitutional body called the 6-10 Office was created to lead the persecution of Falun Gong, and authorities mobilized the state media apparatus, judiciary, police force, army, education system, families, and workplaces to "struggle" against the group.

Since 1999, Falun Gong practitioners have been the targets of systematic torture, mass imprisonment, forced labour, and psychiatric abuse, all with the aim of forcing them to recant their beliefs. As of 2009, The New York Times reported that at least 2,000 Falun Gong practitioners had been killed amid the persecution campaign; Falun Gong sources documented over 3,700 named death cases by 2013. Due to the difficulty in accessing and relaying information from China, however, this may represent only a small portion of actual deaths.

== Allegations, investigations, and tribunal ==
=== Epoch Times reports on Sujiatun ===
The first allegations of large-scale organ harvesting from Falun Gong practitioners were published by The Epoch Times. According to its articles in early 2006, three individuals claimed knowledge of involuntary organ extractions at the Sujiatun Thrombosis Hospital in Shenyang, Liaoning province. One of the whistleblowers, the wife of a surgeon at the hospital, claimed her husband had performed numerous operations to remove the corneas of Falun Gong practitioners for transplant.

Representatives of the U.S. State Department were dispatched to the Sujiatun hospital to investigate the claims. They made two visits, first was unannounced and another a tour of the facilities and found no evidence that the hospital was used for anything other than its normal function, but said they remained concerned over China's treatment of Falun Gong and reports of organ harvesting. Soon thereafter, in May 2006, the Coalition to Investigate the Persecution of Falun Gong asked former Canadian parliamentarian David Kilgour and human rights lawyer David Matas to investigate the broader allegations of organ harvesting from Falun Gong practitioners in China. Kilgour and Matas agreed to conduct an investigation as volunteers.

=== Kilgour-Matas report ===
David Kilgour and David Matas released the results of their preliminary investigation on 20 July 2006, in a report titled "Report into Allegations of Organ Harvesting of Falun Gong Practitioners in China". Although the pair were denied visas to travel to China, they nonetheless compiled over 30 distinct strands of evidence which were consistent with allegations of organ harvesting from Falun Gong practitioners. These included an analysis of statistics on organ transplantation in China, interviews with former Falun Gong prisoners, and recorded admissions from Chinese hospitals and law enforcement offices about the availability of Falun Gong practitioners' organs.

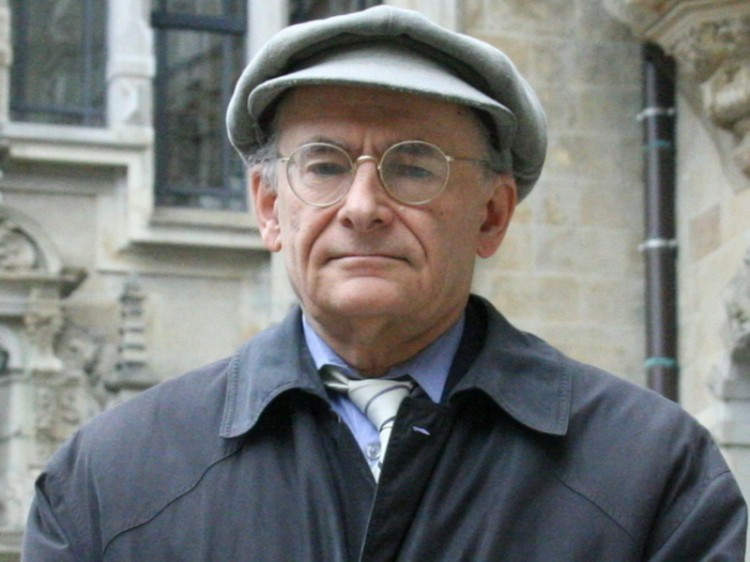
David Matas, senior legal counsel of B'nai Brith Canada, international human rights lawyer, coauthor of Bloody Harvest.

In the absence of evidence that would invalidate the organ harvesting allegations—such as a Chinese government registry showing the source of transplant organs—Kilgour and Matas concluded that the Chinese government and its agencies "have put to death a large but unknown number of Falun Gong prisoners of conscience. Their vital organs, including kidneys, livers, corneas, and hearts, were seized involuntarily for sale at high prices, sometimes to foreigners, who normally face long waits for voluntary donations of such organs in their home countries." They estimated that from 2000 to 2005, the source for 41,500 organ transplants was unexplained, and that Falun Gong prisoners were the most plausible source for these organs. The authors qualified their report by noting the inherent difficulties in verifying the alleged crimes: no independent organizations are allowed to investigate conditions in China, eyewitness evidence is difficult to obtain, and official information about both organ transplantation and executions is often withheld or is contradictory. The initial report however received a mixed reception. In the US, a 2006 Congressional Research Service report by Thomas Lum stated that the Kilgour–Matas report relied largely on logical inference, without bringing forth new or independently obtained testimony; the credibility of much of the key evidence was said to be questionable.

In 2007, Kilgour and Matas presented an updated report under the title "Bloody Harvest: Revised Report into Allegations of Organ Harvesting of Falun Gong Practitioners in China". The findings were subsequently rewritten as a book released in October 2009. The reports received international media coverage, and the authors travelled internationally to present their findings to governments and other concerned organizations. Kilgour and Matas won the 2009 Human Rights Award from the International Society for Human Rights and were nominated for the Nobel Peace Prize in 2010. A documentary on Kilgour and Matas's work, Human Harvest, received a 2014 Peabody Award.

In 2016, Kilgour, Matas and Ethan Gutmann published a new report updating their earlier works Bloody Harvest (2009) and The Slaughter (2014). Drawing on publicly available data, statements, and records from hospitals across China, the report estimated that between 60,000 and 100,000 transplant surgeries were performed annually—far higher than the Chinese government's official figure of 10,000 per year.

=== State Organs: Transplant Abuse in China ===
In 2012, State Organs: Transplant Abuse in China, edited by Matas and Dr. Torsten Trey, was published with essays from physicians, surgeons and professors of medicine including Gabriel Danovitch, Arthur Caplan, Jacob Lavee, Ghazali Ahmad, Maria Fiatarone Singh, Torsten Trey, as well as Ethan Gutmann and Matas.

=== Ethan Gutmann ===
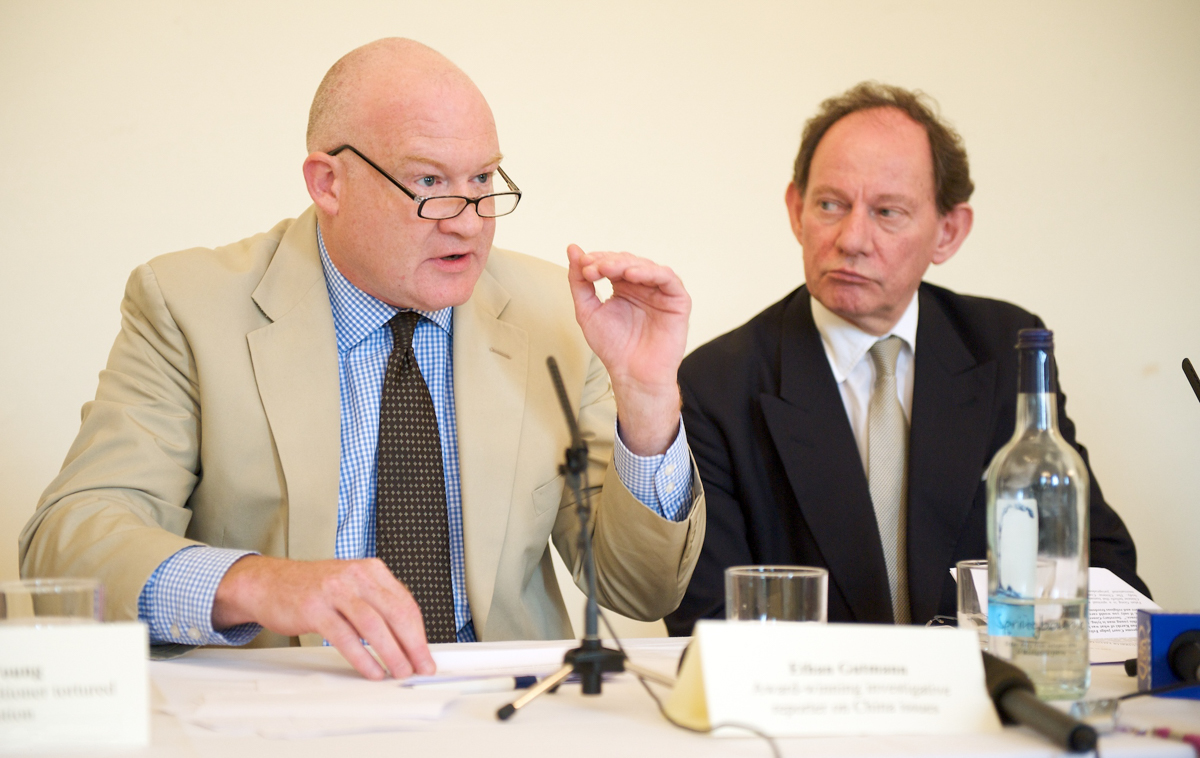
Ethan Gutmann with Edward McMillan-Scott (vice-president of the European Parliament) at Foreign Press Association press conference, 2009

Ethan Gutmann, a journalist and frequent speaker at Falun Gong-organized events, initiated his own investigation of organ harvesting accounts in 2006. Over the span of several years, he conducted interviews with over 100 refugees from China's labor camp and prison system, as well as with Chinese law enforcement personnel and medical professionals.

Gutmann reported that the practice may be traced back to the late 1980s and expanded in the Xinjiang region during the 1990s, when ethnic Uyghurs were targeted in security crackdowns and "strike hard campaigns." Enver Tohti, an exiled pro-Uyghur independence activist, claims to have carried out the first live organ transplant on a Uyghur Muslim prisoner in 1995. He said that the first time he performed the transplant procedure, he was taken to a room near the execution ground in Urumqi and the man's heart was still beating as he removed the liver and kidneys.

Gutmann says that by 1999 organ harvesting in Xinjiang began to decline precipitously, just as overall rates of organ transplantation nationwide were rising. The same year, the Chinese government launched a nationwide suppression of Falun Gong. Gutmann suggests that the new Falun Gong prisoner population overtook Uyghurs as a major source of organs. He estimated that approximately 65,000 practitioners had been killed for their organs between 2000 and 2008 and notes that this figure is similar to that produced by Kilgour and Matas when adjusted to cover the same time period.

Gutmann has also provided testimony on his findings before U.S. Congress and European Parliament, and in August 2014 published his investigation as a book titled The Slaughter: Mass Killings, Organ Harvesting and China's Secret Solution to Its Dissident Problem.

In 2020, Gutmann and Matthew Robertson, a fellow researcher at the Victims of Communism Memorial Foundation and former editor at The Epoch Times, suspected that a large number of Uyghurs were being killed for their organs. The estimated number ranges from 25,000 to 50,000 per year.

=== China Tribunal ===
The Independent Tribunal Into Forced Organ Harvesting of Prisoners of Conscience in China, known as the China Tribunal, was initiated in 2018 by the International Coalition to End Transplant Abuse in China (ETAC) co-founded by Gutmann, Kilgour, Matas, Swedish filmmaker Normann Bjorvand, and Susie Hughes, a long time advocate of the issue. The tribunal, based in London, was made up of a seven-member panel. Sir Geoffrey Nice, a King 's Counsel, was commissioned by ETAC to serve as the chair of the tribunal; he had previously led the international prosecution of Slobodan Milošević, former president of Serbia and of Yugoslavia, for war crimes. According to an article in the scientific journal Nature, the tribunal does not have any legal authority. The Chinese government declined an invitation to take part in the tribunal.

The tribunal heard evidence over a six-month period. The evidence included analyses of Chinese transplant data, and testimony from ex-prisoners, doctors and human rights workers. Among the 50 witnesses, who testified either in person or via video link, were David Kilgour and Jennifer Zeng. The tribunal also examined reports from the Committee Against Torture, Freedom House and Amnesty International. Other submissions included internal Chinese medical records, previous investigations and academic papers. Covertly recorded phone calls with transplant surgeons and undercover footage inside hospitals were also reviewed.

In June 2019, the tribunal published their final judgment which unanimously concluded that crimes against humanity had been committed and involved hundreds of thousands of victims. The tribunal's report said "forced organ harvesting has been committed for years throughout China on a significant scale and ... Falun Gong practitioners have been one—and probably the main—source of organ supply." The tribunal estimated between 60,000 and 90,000 transplant operations occurred per year, much more than the official figures of 10,000 from the Chinese government. The chair of the tribunal said "there is no evidence of the practice having been stopped and the tribunal is satisfied that it is continuing." In an accompanying statement, ETAC called on doctors and organizations worldwide to stop transplantation-related collaboration with China. In September 2019, the tribunal's legal counsel presented its findings to the United Nations Human Rights Council.

The tribunal's report included a reference to a research paper that examined voluntary organ transplant data from 2010 to 2016. The paper's authors said it was difficult to believe the consistent and significant growth in voluntary transplants each year, and they concluded that China's voluntary system probably included non-voluntary donors, likely prisoners. A statistician commissioned by the tribunal reviewed the paper's analysis and agreed that the data on voluntary transplants appeared to be unreliable, while Francis L. Delmonico, a transplant surgeon, said he was unconvinced by the paper because it did not contain direct evidence of organ harvesting from prisoners.

The Telegraph reported in 2022 that the tribunal's findings were largely corroborated by at least eight UN Special Rapporteurs, who described the alleged practices as "credible indicators of forced organ harvesting".

== Evidence cited ==
Various statistics, reports, and anecdotes have been cited as evidence by Gutmann, Kilgour, Matas, and other researchers to argue that Falun Gong practitioners have been killed for their organs in China. They range from the volume and growth of organ transplants in China compared to a relatively low number of known donors, the concurrent mass imprisonment of Falun Gong practitioners, the short wait times for receiving a transplant as if scheduled on-demand, and reports that the health Falun Gong prisoners' organs were medically assessed in custody.

In August 2024, The Diplomat published the account of Cheng Pei Ming, a Falun Gong practitioner detained by Chinese authorities in 2002. According to Cheng, he was forced to undergo repeated operations, including one surgery after he had swallowed a nail and a blade. The removal of such objects is usually done via endoscopy, but Cheng underwent an open chest surgery in 2004. His family, who still remains largely in China, was informed that Cheng likely would not survive. In 2006, he escaped detention during a restroom break and hid in China for nine years. After spending five more years as a refugee in Thailand, he entered the United States in 2020. Medical exams show that portions of his liver and lung had been removed. Cheng is said to be the only known survivor of forced organ harvesting.

=== Increase in nationwide organ transplants after 1999 ===
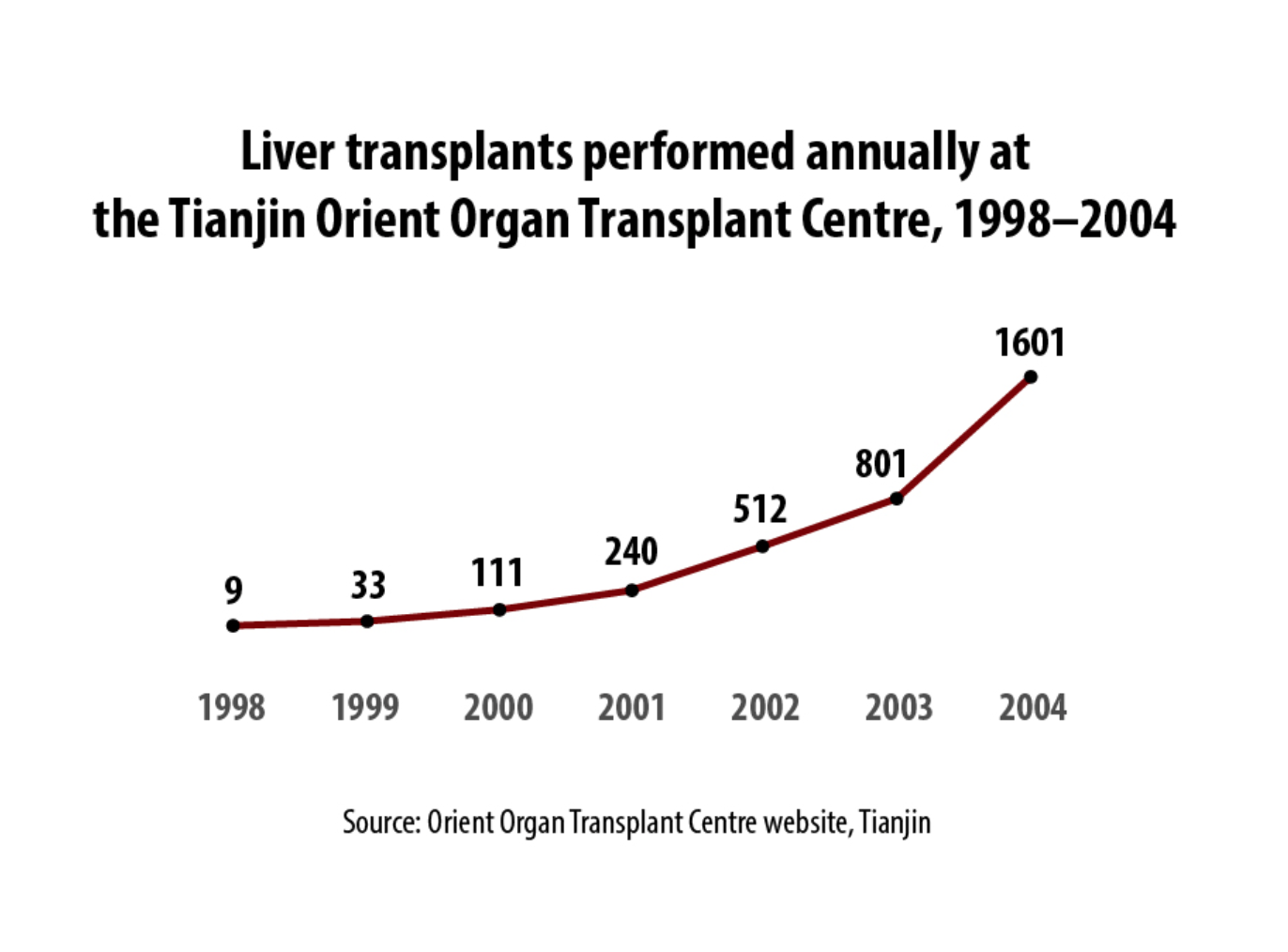
Liver transplants performed annually at the Tianjin Orient Organ Transplant Centre, 1998–2004

The number of organ transplants performed in China grew rapidly beginning in 2000. This timeframe corresponds with the onset of the persecution of Falun Gong, when tens of thousands of Falun Gong practitioners were being sent to Chinese labor camps, detention centers and prisons.

In 1998, the country reported 3,596 kidney transplants annually. By 2001, overseas organ transportation became marketable, and in 2005 alone, there were hundreds of heart, kidney, and liver transplants, with China reporting over 10,000 kidney transplants in particular. Similarly, according to China Daily, the number of liver transplantation centers in China rose from 22 to over 500 between 1999 and 2006. The volume of transplants performed in these centers also increased substantially in this period. One hospital reported on its website that it performed 9 liver transplants in 1998, but completed 676 liver transplants in four months in 2005. The Jiaotong University Hospital in Shanghai recorded seven liver transplants in 2001, 53 in 2002, 105 in 2003, 144 in 2004, and 147 in 2005.

Kilgour and Matas write that the increase in organ transplants cannot be entirely attributed to improvements in transplant technology: "kidney transplant technology was fully developed in China long before the persecution of Falun Gong began. Yet kidney transplants shot up, more than doubling once the persecution of Falun Gong started...Nowhere have transplants jumped so significantly with the same number of donors simply because of a change in technology."

Furthermore, they note that during this period of rapid expansion in China's organ transplant industry, there were no significant improvements to the voluntary organ donation or allocation system, and the supply of death row inmates as donors also did not increase. The parallel between rapid growth in organ transplants and the mass imprisonment of Falun Gong practitioners is consistent with the hypothesis that Falun Gong practitioners in custody were having their organs harvested.

In 2015, China was credited with having the world's largest DNA bank, corresponding the investment with the business of organ transport, with the country reporting 60,000 operations per year with kidney operations being the most lucrative.

=== Low quantity of known sources of organs ===
According to a US congressional report in 2005, up to 95% of organ transplants in China are sourced from prisoners. However, China does not perform enough legal executions to account for the large number of transplants that are performed, and voluntary donations are exceedingly rare (only 130 people registered as voluntary organ donors nationwide from 2003 to 2009).

In 2006, the number of individuals sentenced to death and executed was far fewer than the number of transplants. Based on publicly available reports, Amnesty International documented 1,770 executions in 2006; high-end estimates put the figure closer to 8,000. Because China lacks an organized organ matching and allocation system, and in order to satisfy expectations for very short wait times, it is rare that multiple organs are harvested from the same donor. Moreover, many death row inmates have health conditions such as hepatitis B that would frequently disqualify them as organ donors. This suggests the existence of a secondary source for organs.

In a statement before the U.S. House of Representatives, Damon Noto, a spokesman for Doctors Against Forced Organ Harvesting said "the prisoners sentenced to death cannot fully account for all the transplantations that are taking place in China ... Even if they executed 10,000 and transplanted 10,000 a year, there would still be a very large discrepancy. Why is that? It is simply impossible that those 10,000 people executed would match perfectly the 10,000 people that needed the organs." David Kilgour and David Matas similarly wrote that traditional sources of transplants such as executed prisoners, donors, and the brain dead "come nowhere near to explaining the total number of transplants across China." Like Noto, they point to the large number of Falun Gong practitioners in the labor camp and prison system as a likely alternative source for organs.

=== Short organ transplant wait times ===
Wait periods for organ transplants in China are significantly shorter than elsewhere in the world. According to a 2006 post on the China International Transplantation Assistance Center website, "it may take only one month to receive a liver transplantation, the maximum waiting time being two months. As for the kidney transplantation, it may take one week to find a suitable donor, the maximum time being one month...If something wrong with the donor's organ happens, the patient will have the option to be offered another organ donor and have the operation again in one week." Other organ transplant centers similarly advertised average wait times of one or two weeks for liver and kidney transplants. This is consistent with accounts of organ transplant recipients, who report receiving organs a matter of days or weeks. By comparison, median wait times for a kidney in developed countries such as the United States, Canada and Great Britain typically range from two years to over four years, despite the fact that these countries have millions of registered organ donors and established systems of organ matching and allocation.

Researchers and medical professionals have expressed concern about the implications of the short organ transplant wait times offered by Chinese hospitals. Specifically, they say these wait times are indicative of a pool of living donors whose organs can be removed on demand. This is because organs must be transplanted immediately after death, or must be taken from a living donor (kidneys must be transplanted within 24–48 hours; livers within 12 hours, and hearts within 8 hours).

Kirk C. Allison, associate director of the Program in Human Rights and Medicine at the University of Minnesota, wrote that the "short time frame of an on-demand system [as in China] requires a large pool of donors pre-typed for blood group and HLA matching," which is consistent with reports of Falun Gong prisoners having blood and tissue tested in custody. He wrote that China's short organ wait times could not be assured on a "random death" basis, and that physicians he queried about the matter indicated that they were selecting live prisoners to ensure quality and compatibility. Dr. Jacob Lavee, Director of the Heart Transplant Unit at the Sheba Medical Center in Israel, recounts one of his patients traveling to China for a heart transplant. The patient waited two weeks for a heart, and the surgery was scheduled in advance—meaning the organ could not have been procured on the basis of a random death. Franz Immer, chairman of the Swiss National Foundation for organ donation and transplantation, reports that during a visit to Beijing in 2007, he was invited by his Chinese hosts to observe a heart transplantation operation: "The organizer asked us whether we would like to have the transplantation operation in the morning or in the afternoon. This means that the donor would die, or be killed, at a given time, at the convenience of the visitors. I refused to participate."

Editors of the Journal of Clinical Investigation write that "The only way to guarantee transplant of a liver or heart during the relatively short time period that a transplant tourist is in China is to quickly obtain the requisite medical information from prospective recipients, find matches among them, and then execute a person who is a suitable match." Noto similarly says that China's organ transplant wait times and the ability to schedule transplants in advance can only be achieved by having a large supply of "living donors that are available on demand." Death row inmates alone are not numerous enough to meet this demand.

=== Detention of Falun Gong practitioners ===
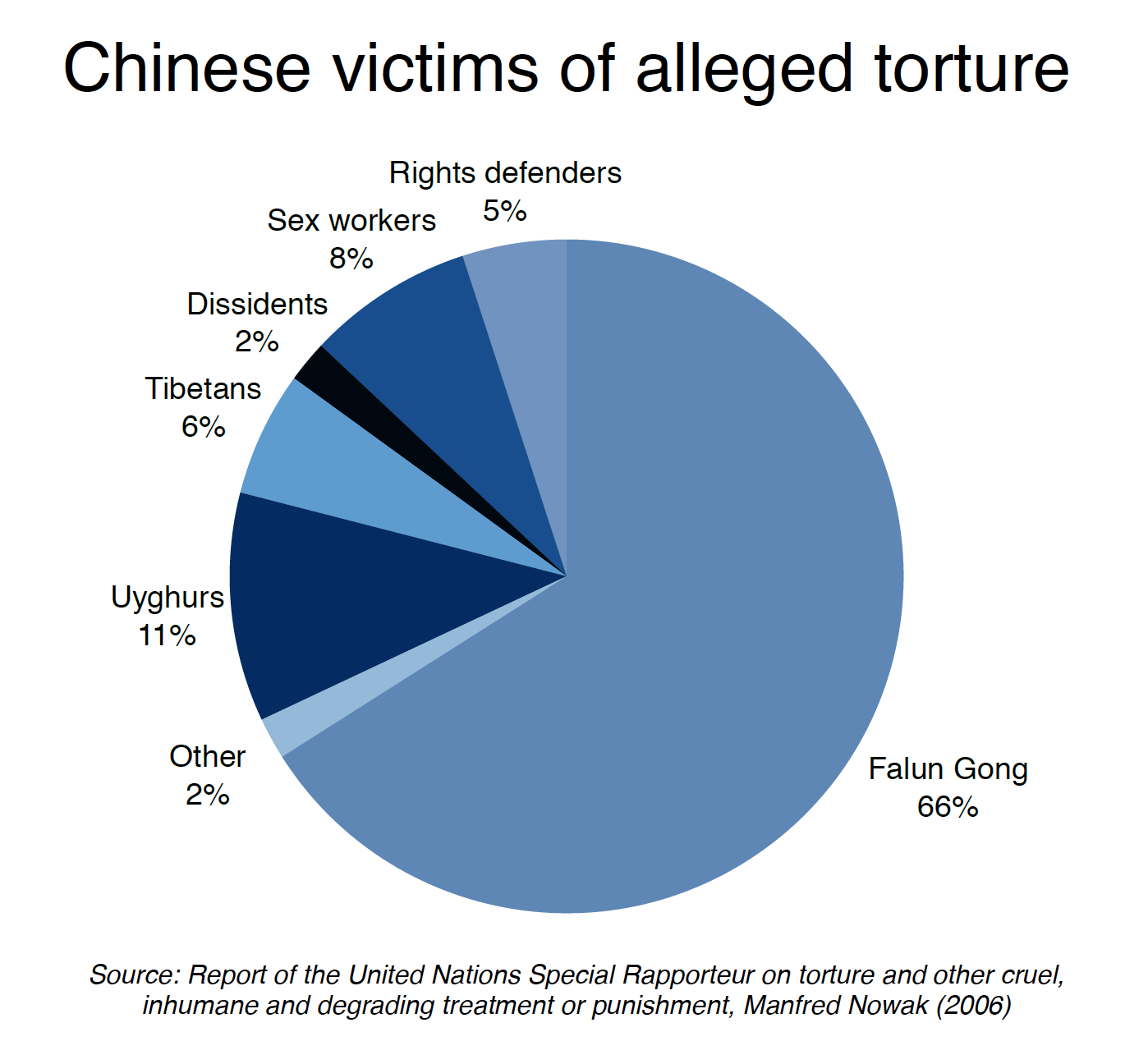
Chinese torture victims as reported in the 2006 investigation of UN Special Rapporteur Manfred Nowak

Since 1999, hundreds of thousands of Falun Gong practitioners have been detained in re-education through labor camps, prisons, and other detention facilities in China, making them the largest group of prisoners of conscience in the country. In 2008, the US Department of State cited estimates that half of China's official labor camp population of 250,000 were Falun Gong practitioners, and a 2013 report by Amnesty International found that Falun Gong practitioners comprised between 30 and 100 percent of detainees in the labor camps studied.

Former Chinese prisoners have also reported that Falun Gong practitioners consistently received the "longest sentences and worst treatment" in the camps, and that they are singled out for torture and abuse. In 2006, a study by the UN's Special Rapporteur on Torture noted that 66% of reported cases from China involved Falun Gong victims. Thousands of Falun Gong practitioners have died or been killed in custody, often under disputed circumstances. Family members of the deceased have reported being denied an autopsy; in some instances bodies were summarily cremated without the family's consent. Analysts and rights groups have pointed to several factors that drive the especially severe treatment against Falun Gong practitioners in custody. These include directives issued from central government or Communist Party authorities; incentives and quota systems that encourage abuse; a sense of impunity in the event of deaths in custody; and the effects of the state propaganda that dehumanizes and vilifies Falun Gong practitioners.

The large numbers of Falun Gong prisoners in custody has led researchers to identify them as a likely source for organs. According to Gutmann's research, other marginalized prisoner groups may also have been targeted, including ethnic Tibetans and Uyghurs who reside predominantly in China's western regions. However, for reasons of geographic proximity, Falun Gong practitioners are more likely to be targeted. In addition, because their spiritual practice prohibits smoking or consumption of alcohol, they tend to be comparatively healthy.

In the context of organ harvesting, Kilgour and Matas point to a further source of vulnerability. Namely, in order to protect family members from punishment by security agencies, many detained Falun Gong practitioners refuse to give their names or other personally identifying information to police. "Though this refusal to identify themselves was done for protection purposes, it may have had the opposite effect. It is easier to victimize a person whose whereabouts is unknown to family members than a person whose location the family knows," says their report. Kilgour and Matas wrote that they had yet to meet or hear of any Falun Gong practitioners who were safely released from custody after refusing to identify themselves, despite the prevalence of this practice. Similarly, Ethan Gutmann reports that in over a hundred interviews with former prisoners, he encountered only one Falun Gong practitioner who had remained nameless while in custody, and "her organs were even more worn out than my own."

==== Medical testing in custody ====
Ethan Gutmann interviewed dozens of former Chinese prisoners, including sixteen Falun Gong practitioners who recalled undergoing unusual medical tests while in detention. Gutmann says some of these tests were likely routine examinations, and some may have been designed to screen for the SARS virus. However, in several cases, the medical tests described were exclusively aimed at assessing the health of internal organs.

One man, Wang Xiaohua, was imprisoned in a labor camp in Yunnan in 2001 when he and twenty other Falun Gong detainees were taken to a hospital. They had large quantities of blood drawn, in addition to urine samples, abdominal x-rays, and electrocardiogram. Hospital staff did not tend to physical injuries they had suffered in custody. This pattern was repeated in several other interviews. Qu Yangyao, a 30-something Chinese refugee, was taken from a labor camp to a hospital in 2000 along with two other Falun Gong practitioners. She says that hospital staff drew large volumes of blood, conducted chest x-rays and probed the prisoners' organs. There was "no hammer on the knee, no feeling for lymph nodes, no examination of ears or mouth or genitals—the doctor checked her retail organs and nothing else," writes Gutmann.

Another woman, Jung Tian, recounts comprehensive physical exams and the extraction of large volumes of blood—enough for advanced diagnostics or tissue matching—while in a detention center in Shenyang city. At a women's labor camp in Guangdong province, a former detainee says that 180 Falun Gong prisoners were subject to medical tests in early 2003 and that the tests exclusively focused on internal organs. Another female witness who was held at Masanjia Labor Camp in 2005 said that only young, healthy practitioners had comprehensive medical exams upon arrival at the camp; the old and infirm were given only cursory treatment.

In addition to Falun Gong practitioners, researcher Jaya Gibson identified three Tibetan prisoners who were subject to "organs-only" medical exams, all of them shortly after 2005.

=== Phone calls to hospitals and detention centers ===
In March 2006, after allegations of forced organ harvesting emerged, overseas Falun Gong members began placing phone calls to Chinese hospitals and police detention centers posing as prospective transplant recipients or organ brokers. They inquired about the availability of Falun Gong organs and in several instances obtained recorded admissions that organs could be procured from Falun Gong prisoners. A selection of these conversations were cited as evidence in the report by David Kilgour and David Matas.

In one such call to a police detention center in Mishan city, an official said that they had five to eight Falun Gong practitioners under the age of 40 who were potential organ suppliers. When asked for details on the background of these individuals, the official indicated that they were male Falun Gong prisoners from rural areas.

A doctor at the Minzu hospital in Nanning city said that the hospital did not currently have Falun Gong organs available, but that he had previously selected Falun Gong prisoners for organ harvesting. The doctor also advised the caller to contact a university hospital in neighboring Guangdong province, saying that they had better channels to obtain Falun Gong organs. At the Zhongshan hospital in Shanghai, a doctor told investigators that all his hospital's organs were sourced from Falun Gong practitioners. During an April 2006 phone call to a military hospital in Guangzhou, a doctor told investigators that he had "several batches" of Falun Gong organs, but that the supply could run dry after 20 May 2006. In another call, investigators posed as an organ broker to call the Jinzhou city people's court. In response to a question about obtaining organs from Falun Gong prisoners, a court official said "that depends on your qualifications ... If you have good qualifications, we may still provide some [organs]."

Kilgour and Matas concede that in at least some instances, the hospital staff may have been supplying answers that the callers wanted to hear in order to make a sale. The results of these phone calls would also be difficult to replicate; as allegations of organ harvesting from Falun Gong gained attention, hospitals would become more reluctant to candidly discuss their organ sourcing practices.

A 2006 report from the US Congressional Research Service (CRS) noted the conclusions of Kilgour-Matas Report had relied heavily on the telephone transcripts, in which PRC respondents allegedly described the practice of harvesting organs from living Falun Gong detainees. However, the CRS report expressed doubt regarding the reliability of these phone conversations and the "apparent candor" of the respondents, given Chinese government controls over sensitive information.

Later, such phone recordings were examined by China Tribunal's panel and considered credible. One of the organizers professed that a forensic speech scientist had verified the recording of an undercover phone conversation with Bai Shuzhong, former Minister of Health for the People's Liberation Army's General Logistics Department, during which Bai said the order to harvest organs from Falun Gong practitioners came from former Chinese president Jiang Zemin.

According to Kilgour and Matas, Chinese transplant doctor Lu Guoping of Minzu hospital publicly admitted to receiving such a call in a TV interview; this confirms that the voice they had recorded was indeed from Lu and "as close to a smoking gun" as they were ever likely to get.

Chinese hospitals began to systematically delete data and evidence after the first reports based on international investigation were published in 2006. One undercover phone investigator said that the Chinese doctors in her calls were more open to admitting having Falun Gong organs over the phone before the allegations gained international publicity.

=== Commercial incentives ===
The growth of a commercial organ trade is linked to economic reforms in the late 1980s and early 1990s that saw a steep decline in government funding to the healthcare system. Healthcare moved toward a more market-driven model, and hospitals devised new ways to grow their revenue. This pattern also applies to military hospitals; since the mid-1980s, the People's Liberation Army has engaged in commercial and profit-making ventures to supplement its budget.

In their report on organ harvesting from Falun Gong practitioners, Kilgour and Matas describe transplant hospitals in China that cater to wealthy foreigners who paid upwards of $100,000 for liver, lung, and heart transplants. For instance, the website of the China International Transplantation Network Assistance Center posted the following price list on its website in 2006: Kidney: $62,000; Liver: $98,000–130,000; Liver+kidney: $160,000–180,000; Kidney+pancreas: $150,000; Lung: $150,000–170,000; Heart: $130,000–160,000; Cornea: $30,000. In a statement before the U.S. House of Representatives, Gabriel Danovitch of the UCLA Medical Center said, "The ease in which these organs can be obtained and the manner that they may be allocated to wealthy foreigners has engendered a culture of corruption."

=== Bo Xilai and Liaoning province ===
Bo Xilai was governor of Liaoning province, which researchers believe was a major center for organ harvesting. The World Organization to Investigate the Persecution of Falun Gong made phone calls to mid- and high-level officials with prior connections to Bo, posing as members of the Communist Party's discipline and inspection body that was building a case against him. They asked questions about the chain of command involved in procuring organs from prisoners, including Falun Gong practitioners. When asked about Bo's involvement in organ harvesting, one senior Politburo member reportedly told investigators that Standing Committee member and security chief Zhou Yongkang "is in charge of this specifically. He knows it."

A city-level official in Liaoning province was asked by investigators what instructions Bo Xilai may have given on organ removal from Falun Gong prisoners. The official replied: "I was asked to take care of this task. Party central is actually taking care of this... Bo was involved quite positively. At that time we mainly talked about it during the meetings within the Standing Committee." The official ended the call after realizing that he had not confirmed the caller's identity.

In his book on organ transplant abuse, Ethan Gutmann included a case study centered on Liaoning province. Bo served as mayor and party chief of Dalian in the 1990s and was appointed governor of Liaoning from 2001 to 2004. The province had a high concentration of Falun Gong practitioners and recorded the country's highest number of reported Falun Gong deaths in custody. Several observers have noted that Bo pursued an especially intense campaign against Falun Gong in the province, leading to allegations of torture and crimes against humanity.

Bo's close associate Wang Lijun was appointed head of the Public Security Bureau in Jinzhou, Liaoning, in 2003. In this capacity, he ran an organ transplantation facility where he reportedly oversaw "several thousand" organ transplants, leading to concerns that many of the organs were taken from political prisoners. During a 2006 award ceremony, Wang stated: "For a veteran policeman, to see someone executed and within minutes to see the transformation in which this person's life was extended in the bodies of several other people—it was soul-stirring. Gutmann argued that it was "extremely unlikely" all the organs used in these operations came from executed death-row prisoners, who would not have been sufficient in number to supply thousands of transplants. He noted that Liaoning detained large numbers of Falun Gong practitioners in labor camps and prisons, and added: "It is also germane that both Bo Xilai and Wang Lijun built a large measure of their political power on the repression of Falun Gong."

In addition to the organ transplants in Jinzhou, Gutmann wrote that security agencies in Dalian supplied human cadavers to two major plastination factories, where the bodies were plastinated and displayed internationally. According to an informant interviewed on the program 20/20, the cadavers came from executed prisoners. Gutmann again noted a numerical disparity: the plastination factories in Dalian processed thousands of cadavers, far more than could plausibly have been sourced from voluntary donations or legally executed prisoners. The establishment of these factories coincided with the onset of the persecution of Falun Gong.

== Counterarguments ==
According to a 2016 Associated Press article, claims of forced organ harvesting from Falun Gong practitioners had existed for years but not been independently verified. This was in part due to China's opaque legal system. The issue had not been advocated by most international human rights groups, although in 2017 the U.S.-funded Freedom House stated that there was credible evidence suggesting large-scale organ harvesting from Falun Gong practitioners.

A 2017 article by The Washington Post disputes that China secretly conducts 60,000 to 100,000 organ transplants per year. Data compiled by Quintiles IMS show China's share of global demand for immunosuppressant drugs, which are necessary to prevent the bodies of patients from rejecting transplanted organs, was approximately in line with the proportion of global transplants China said it performed. The journal also reports that lawyers who had represented Falun Gong practitioners rejected organ harvesting allegations and quotes a lawyer had "never heard of organs being taken from live prisoners" after defending 300 to 400 adepts of the movement. According to health official Huang Jiefu, who has been working with an American surgeon to transform China's transplant practices, a total of 13,238 organ transplant operations were performed in 2016. Xu Jiapeng, a Quintiles IMS account manager in Beijing, said it was "unthinkable" to operate a clandestine system that the data on immunosuppressants did not pick up. An Australian surgeon and vocal critic of China's past transplant practices said it would not be plausible for the country to have more transplantations per year than the United States without that information leaking out.

Kilgour, Matas, Gutmann, and experts in fields such as medicine wrote to the Post saying that drug prices can be 2.5 to 4 times cheaper in China than in the U.S., making sales data an unreliable proxy for dosage, and that a country's global share of immunosuppressant sales does not need to match its share of transplantations, citing Japan and the U.S. as counterexamples. Their letter also states that most Chinese hospitals have an unofficial pharmacy whose "significant" amount of business data are not included in IMS figures.

Critics have alleged that China's immunosuppressant data would not include foreign transplant tourists but The Washington Post reported that these assertions did not stand up to scrutiny. Jose Nuñez, head of the World Health Organization's transplantation program, said the number of foreigners going to China for transplants in 2015 was "really very low" compared with India, Pakistan, the United States as well as China's past. On the other hand, a documentary by South Korea's TV Chosun contained interview footage showing that a Chinese transplant center, as of late 2017, was accepting foreign patients and providing them and their families with customized services.

== Chinese government response ==
From 2006 to 2008, two UN Special Rapporteurs made repeated requests to the Chinese government to respond to allegations about Falun Gong prisoners and explain the source of organs used in transplant operations. The Chinese government said it is in compliance with World Health Organization standards and described the conditions under which organ transplants are permitted under Chinese laws and regulations. It further stated that allegations of organ harvesting "are merely the product of agitation by Falun Gong ... most of them have already been revealed to be unfounded rumours". Kilgour and Matas say that the Chinese government's response to their investigation contained "a good deal of invective, but no factual information which contradicts or undermines our conclusions or analysis".

The Chinese government also has sought to prevent public discussion of the issue outside its own borders, and has punished Chinese nationals who have spoken on the subject of organ harvesting. According to British politician Edward McMillan-Scott, during a visit to China in 2006, a Falun Gong practitioner and tour guide named Cao Dong said, while imprisoned, he saw his friend's cadaver "in the morgue with holes where body parts had been removed". Cao was later convicted of meeting with McMillan-Scott and re-imprisoned.

In 2007, the Chinese embassy in Canada intervened to cancel the broadcast of a documentary on Falun Gong and organ harvesting, which was scheduled to air on the national broadcast network CBC Television. The same year, the Chinese embassy in Israel tried unsuccessfully to cancel a talk by researcher David Matas on the subject of organ harvesting, threatening that his testimony would have an adverse impact on China–Israel relations.

In response to a 2014 resolution on organ harvesting by the U.S. House of Representatives, a Chinese embassy spokesperson said that China requires written consent from organ donors, and declared that "the so-called organ harvesting from death-row prisoners is totally a lie fabricated by Falun Gong". The embassy representative then urged American lawmakers to stop "supporting and conniving" with Falun Gong.

== International response ==
=== Medical associations ===
Allegations about organ harvesting from Falun Gong led to renewed focus on China's transplant practices by international medical authorities and professional associations. Medical professionals have raised a number of concerns stemming from the use of prisoner organs, and have debated the ethics of conducting exchanges with Chinese transplant hospitals.

In 2006, the World Medical Association adopted a resolution demanding that China stop using prisoners as organ donors.

Since 2011, several medical journals have declared that they would cease publishing articles related to organ transplantation operations in China due to concerns about violations of medical ethics. The Journal of Clinical Investigation, a prestigious publication on biomedical research, declared that China's use of organs from executed prisoners "violates basic human rights. It violates core ethical precepts of transplant medicine and medical ethics. Worse still, some of those who are killed may be prisoners whose 'crimes' involve no more than holding certain political or spiritual beliefs." The journal decided that it would no longer accept manuscripts on human organ transplantation "unless appropriate non-coerced consent of the donor is provided and substantiated". A similar opinion was expressed by authors in the American Journal of Transplantation.

Writing in The Lancet in 2011, a group of prominent American surgeons and bioethicists called for a boycott of Chinese science and medicine pertaining to organ transplantation. "It is clear from the numbers provided by China that not all of the organs for Chinese citizens and transplant tourists are provided by voluntary consenting donors. The source of many of these organs is executed prisoners whose consent is either non-existent or ethically invalid and whose demise might be timed for the convenience of the waiting recipient", they wrote. The article's lead author, Dr. Arthur Caplan, later added "Killing prisoners for their parts is unethical on its own", but the practice is even more heinous given that some of the executed prisoners were imprisoned for religious or political beliefs.

In contrast, Jeremy Chapman, Australian transplantation surgeon, dismissed Kilgour and Matas's report as "pure imagination piled upon political interest".

In 2022, the International Society for Heart and Lung Transplantation (ISHLT) issued a policy statement to exclude transplant-related research involving human donors from China from its publications and scientific meetings due to the amount of evidence showing that the Chinese government stands alone in systematically supporting organ or tissue procurement from executed prisoners, a practice that the ISHLT identifies as a violation of fundamental human rights and the principle of voluntary donation.

=== United Nations Special Rapporteurs ===
From 2006 to 2008, two UN Special Rapporteurs made repeated requests to the Chinese government to respond to allegations about Falun Gong prisoners and explain the source of organs used in transplant operations. In a February 2008 report, UN Special Rapporteur on Torture Manfred Nowak noted that in China "there are many more organ transplants than identifiable sources of organs ... It is alleged that the discrepancy between available organs and numbers from identifiable sources is explained by organs harvested from Falun Gong practitioners, and that the rise in transplants from 2000 coincides and correlates with the beginning of the persecution of these persons". The Chinese government's responses did not address these questions or explain the sources of transplant organs.

In June 2021, the Special Procedures of the United Nations Human Rights Council voiced concerns over having "received credible information that detainees from ethnic, linguistic or religious minorities may be forcibly subjected to blood tests and organ examinations such as ultrasound and x-rays, without their informed consent; while other prisoners are not required to undergo such examinations." The press release stated that UN's human rights experts "were extremely alarmed by reports of alleged 'organ harvesting' targeting minorities, including Falun Gong practitioners, Uyghurs, Tibetans, Muslims and Christians, in detention in China."

=== Responses from other governments ===
Several national governments have held hearings in their national legislatures regarding organ harvesting from Falun Gong practitioners, with some of them subsequently adopting resolutions condemning organ transplant abuses in China or developing legislation to ban transplant tourism.

==== United States ====
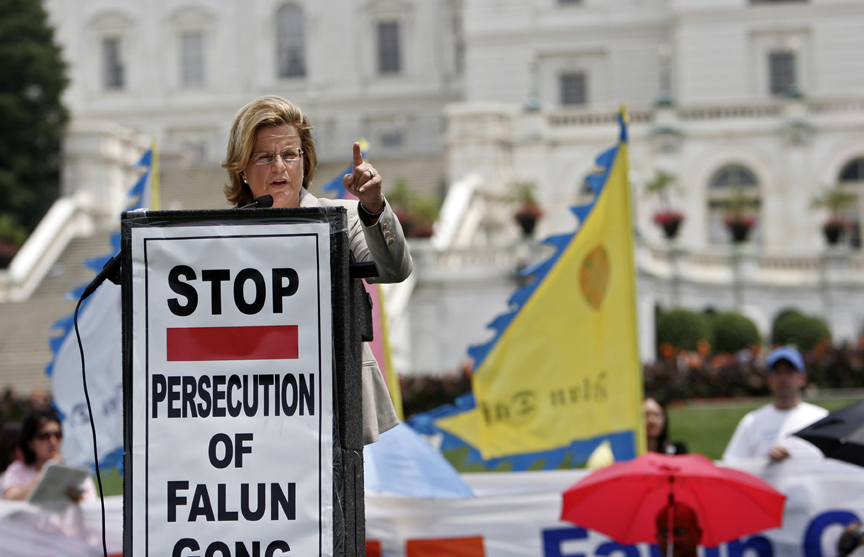
Rep. Ileana Ros-Lehtinen, who co-sponsored a Congressional resolution condemning organ harvesting from Falun Gong adherents, speaks at a rally in Washington D.C.

In July 2014, the Foreign Affairs Subcommittee of the U.S. House of Representatives unanimously adopted a resolution condemning state-sanctioned organ harvesting from Falun Gong prisoners of conscience and members of other minority groups. The allegations have also surfaced in reports by the Congressional-Executive Commission on China, and in the Department of State Country Report on Human Rights for China for 2011. In January 2015, the White House responded to a petition signed by 34,000 Americans condemning organ harvesting from Falun Gong prisoners. The response noted that: "China's leaders have announced a pledge to abolish the practice of taking human organs for transplant from executed prisoners, although we are aware of continued reports of such practices. We take such allegations very seriously and will continue to monitor the situation."

In 2016, the US House of Representatives unanimously passed resolution H.Res.343 expressing concerns over credible reports of state-sanctioned organ harvesting from Falun Gong practitioners and other prisoners of conscience, and urging China to stop the practice.

In 2023, several U.S. House representatives introduced legislation and spoke out against organ harvesting in foreign countries. One such bill, the Stop Forced Organ Harvesting Act of 2023, addressed some of these concerns by "imposing sanctions and allowing the State Department to revoke the passports of those convicted of organ trafficking-related crimes."

In 2024, after multiple hearings, the "Falun Gong Protection Act" (H.R. 4132) was unanimously passed by the U.S. House of Representatives on 25 June. The Act focuses on addressing forced organ harvesting in the People's Republic of China, specifically targeting the persecution of Falun Gong practitioners.USA Congressional Bill, H.R.4132 - Falun Gong Protection Act, 25 June 2024

==== European Union ====
The European Parliament heard testimony about organ harvesting in China during a 6 December 2012 session on human rights in China. One year later, it passed a resolution expressing "deep concern over the persistent and credible reports of systematic, state-sanctioned organ harvesting from non-consenting prisoners of conscience in the People's Republic of China, including from large numbers of Falun Gong practitioners imprisoned for their religious beliefs, as well as from members of other religious and ethnic minority groups." The resolution called for the immediate release of all prisoners of conscience, and urged Chinese authorities to respond to United Nations inquiries about the source of organs used in transplants. In March 2014, the European Economic and Social Committee in Brussels convened a follow-up event on organ transplant abuses in China. Participants and speakers at the session endorsed the recommendations of the parliamentary resolution, which recognized that Falun Gong and other minority groups are targets of forced organ harvesting in China. EESC President Henri Malosse called for greater pressure to be put on the Chinese government to end organ transplant abuses. In 2022 the European Parliament adopted another resolution expressing concerns over reports of forced organ harvesting from prisoners of conscience in China and calling on the EU and its Member States to condemn China's transplant abuses and take preventative actions.

==== Italy ====
In March 2014, the members of the Italian commission on human rights unanimously adopted a resolution calling for the immediate release of Falun Gong practitioners and other prisoners of conscience in China, and urging Italian hospitals to reconsider collaborations with China in the area of organ transplants. In 2015, the Italian Senate adopted a bill which makes it a crime to traffic in organs from living donors. Individuals found guilty of this offence could face 3–12 years in prison and fines of up to 300,000 Euros (US$350,000).

==== Australia ====
In December 2006, the Australian Ministry of Health revealed that two of the country's major organ transplant hospitals had banned training of Chinese surgeons, in response to concerns about organ harvesting from Falun Gong practitioners and other prisoners. On 21 March 2013, the Australian Senate unanimously passed a motion concerning reports of organ harvesting in China. The motion, which was introduced one day after a parliamentary briefing on the subject of organ harvesting from Falun Gong prisoners, called on Australia to adopt strict standards to address the practice of international organ trafficking. The same year, Green party lawmakers in New South Wales, Australia, proposed legislation to criminalize and create specific offenses related to trafficking in human organs and tissue.

In 2018, Graham Fletcher, the head of the Department of Foreign Affairs and Trade's North Asia Division, said "the idea that there is a separate, parallel, hidden, vast network of unspeakable activity where people are essentially killed for their organs, we don't believe that that is happening." Graham's statement was to a parliamentary inquiry into organ trading.

==== Israel ====
In 2007, Israel's national legislative body the Knesset adopted new legislation barring insurance companies from providing coverage to Israeli citizens who travel abroad to purchase organs. The move was partly a response to an investigation in which Israeli authorities arrested several men involved in mediating transplants of Chinese prisoners' organs for Israelis. One of the men had stated in an undercover interview that the organs came from "people who oppose the regime, those sentenced to death and from prisoners of the Falun Gong." In addition to prohibiting citizens from buying organs overseas, the law also imposed criminal charges on organ traffickers. The new rules resulted in a significant decrease in the number of Israeli citizens seeking transplants abroad, while also helping to catalyze an expansion of the voluntary donor registry domestically.

==== Spain ====
In 2010, Spain implemented a law prohibiting its nationals from traveling abroad to obtain illegal organ transplants. The legislation was proposed after a Spanish citizen reportedly traveled to Tianjin, China, where he obtained a liver for US$130,000 after waiting for just 20 days. The Spanish legislation makes it a crime to promote or facilitate an illegal organ transplant, punishable with up to 12 years in prison. In addition, any organization found to have participated in illegal organ transplant transactions will be subject to a fine.

==== Taiwan ====
In June 2015, Taiwan passed an amendment to the "Human Organ Transplantation Act" to require people who have transplants abroad to provide details to local hospitals. Democratic Progressive Party legislator Yu Mei-nu said many Taiwanese go to China for illegal organ transplantations.

==== Canada and France ====
Similar bills against organ tourism have been proposed in the French national assembly (2010) and in Canadian parliament (2007, 2013).

On 10 December 2018, the S-240 bill – An Act to amend the Criminal Code and the Immigration and Refugee Protection Act (trafficking in human organs), was read the second time in House of Commons of Canada and referred to Canadian House of Commons Standing Committee on Foreign Affairs and International Development. In the debate, Vice-chair of Foreign Affairs and International Development Subcommittee on International Human Rights (SDIR) MP Ms. Cheryl Hardcastle stated that:

"...the numbers may actually be between 60,000 and 100,000 organ transplants per year... The principal victims of China's organ-harvesting industry was the country's Falun Gong followers... China's organ-harvesting industry developed in tandem with its systematic repression of Falun Gong... Organ harvesting and trafficking are a nauseating reality and we must put a stop to them."

The bill was not passed into law during the 42nd Parliament or when reconsidered in the 43rd as S-204. However, the bill was passed by the 44th Parliament as S-223 on 15 December 2022.

== See also ==
- Antireligious campaigns of the Chinese Communist Party
- Chinese body dissection exhibition
- Chris Smith
- Dana Rohrabacher
- Gunther von Hagens
- Organ donation in the United States prison population
- Organ transplantation in China
