= Organ transplantation in China =

Organ transplantation in China has taken place since the 1960s, and by the early 2000s had become one of the world’s largest transplant programmes, with official figures reporting over 13,000 liver and kidney transplants in 2004. However, independent academic analyses have raised questions about the accuracy of these official figures and highlighted gaps in the transparency of China’s transplant data. Official registries are not fully accessible to outside researchers, making independent verification of transplant numbers and the sources of organs difficult.

Involuntary organ harvesting was once legal on criminals, but outlawed in 2015. Growing concerns about possible ethical abuses arising from coerced consent and corruption led medical groups and human rights organizations, by the 1990s, to condemn the practice. These concerns resurfaced in 2001, when a Chinese asylum-seeking doctor testified that he had taken part in organ extraction operations.

In 2006, allegations emerged that many Falun Gong practitioners had been killed to supply China's organ transplant industry. An initial investigation stated "the source of 41,500 transplants for the six year period 2000 to 2005 is unexplained" and concluded that "there has been and continues today to be large scale organ seizures from unwilling Falun Gong practitioners".

In December 2005, China's Deputy Health Minister acknowledged that the practice of removing organs from executed prisoners for transplants was widespread. In 2007, China issued regulations banning the commercial trading of organs, and the Chinese Medical Association agreed that the organs of prisoners should not be used for transplantation, except for members of the immediate family of the deceased. In 2008, a liver-transplant registry system was established in Shanghai, along with a nationwide proposal to incorporate information on individual driving permits for those wishing to donate their organs.

Despite these initiatives, China Daily reported in August 2009 that approximately 65% of transplanted organs still came from death row prisoners. The condemned prisoners have been described as "not a proper source for organ transplants" by Vice-Health Minister Huang Jiefu, and in March 2010, he announced the trial of China's first organ donation program starting after death, jointly run by the Red Cross Society and the Ministry of Health, in 10 pilot regions. In 2013, Huang altered his position on utilizing prisoners' organs, stating that death row prisoners should be allowed to donate organs and should be integrated into the new computer-based organ allocation system.

In 2014, China announced that it would stop using organs from executed prisoners for transplants starting January 1, 2015. However, critics described this as an "administrative trick," noting that prisoners including those on death row are reclassified as citizens, allowing their organs to continue being used in transplants. In 2018 and 2019, media investigations and academic analysis into these allegations increased. In August 2024, media outlets reported on the first known survivor of China’s forced organ harvesting.

Organ transplantation in China from 2015 to 2024 View source data.

== Background ==
Globally, pioneering experimental studies in the surgical technique of human organ transplantation were made in the early 1900s by the French surgeon Alexis Carrel, and successful transplants starting spreading worldwide after the Second World War.

China itself began organ transplantation in the 1960s, which grew to an annual peak of over 13,000 transplants in 2004; and, despite some deaths from infection and hepatitis, the transplant programme has been successful in saving many lives. Though the number of transplants fell to under 11,000 annually by 2005, China still has one of the largest transplant programmes in the world. China explores innovative surgery, such as the world's first flesh and bone face transplant, performed by Professor Guo Shuzhong. Organ donation, however, has met resistance, and involuntary organ donation is illegal under Chinese law, as it is against Chinese tradition and culture, which attach symbolic life affirming importance to the kidney and heart.

China is not alone in encountering donation difficulties; demand outstrips supply in most countries. The world-wide shortage has encouraged some countries—such as India—to trade in human organs. Reports of organs being removed from executed prisoners in China for sale internationally had been circulating since the mid-1980s, when a 1984 regulation made it legal to harvest organs from convicted criminals with the consent of the family or if the body goes unclaimed. Development of an immunosuppressant drug, cyclosporine A, made transplants a more viable option for patients.

== Milestones ==
The first living related renal transplant was performed in China in 1972; the first allogeneic bone marrow transplantation was successfully executed in an acute leukaemia patient. The first recorded clinical liver transplant from a living donor in China took place in 1995, seven years after the world's first was performed in São Paulo, Brazil. Between January 2001 and October 2003, 45 patients received living donor liver transplantation (LDLT) at five different hospitals. In 2002, doctors at Xijing Hospital of the Fourth Military Medical University described three cases of living related liver transplantation. In 2003 a landmark brain-death case involving switched off ventilation came to the attention of the public and made a big impact on medical ethics and legislation. The first successful brain-death organ donation soon followed. From October 2003 to July 2006, 52 LDLT operations were conducted at the West China Hospital, West China Medical Center of Sichuan University. In October 2004, Peking University People's Hospital Liver Transplantation Center executed two cases of living related liver transplantation involving complex blood vessel anatomy. In 2002, the Chinese media reported surgeon Dr Zheng Wei successfully transplanted a whole ovary at the Zhejiang Medical Science University to a 34-year-old patient, Tang Fangfang, from her sister. In April 2006, the Xijing military hospital in Xian carried out a face transplant operation covering the cheek, upper lip, and nose of Li Guoxing, who was mauled by an Asiatic black bear while protecting his sheep.

The first successful penis transplant procedure was performed in September 2006, at a military hospital in Guangzhou. The patient, a 44-year-old male, had sustained the loss of most of his penis in an accident. The transplanted penis came from a brain-dead 22-year-old male. Although successful, the patient and his wife suffered psychological trauma as a result of the procedure, and had the surgery reversed fifteen days later. Following this, Jean-Michel Dubernard, famous for performing the world's first face transplant, wrote that the case "raises many questions and has some critics". He alluded to a double standard writing, "I cannot imagine what would have been the reactions of the medical profession, ethics specialists, and the media if a European surgical team had performed the same operation."

== International concerns ==
=== Organs sourced from death row prisoners ===
Transplantation first began in the early 1970s China, when organs were sourced from executed prisoners. Although other sources, such as brain-dead donors, had been tried, the lack of legal framework hampered efforts. Dr Klaus Chen said in 2007 that this was still the dominant pool. The Laogai Research Foundation website have a portal to display the relationship between execution and organ market in China. Concerns that some poorer countries were answering donor shortages by selling organs to richer countries led the World Medical Association (WMA) to condemn the purchase and sale of human organs for transplantation at Brussels in 1985, in 1987 and at Stockholm in 1994.

In Madrid in 1987, the World Health Organization (WHO) condemned the practice of extracting organs from executed prisoners due to the difficulty of knowing if they had given consent. Growing concern led other professional societies and human rights organisations to condemn the practice in the 1990s, and to question the way in which the organs were obtained. The WHO starting drafting an international guideline (WHA44.25) on human organ transplants in 1987 which resulted in the WHO Guiding Principles on Human Organ Transplantation being endorsed in 1991. However, the wording did not allow the international community to draw up any laws preventing China from continuing to trade in human organs.

The United States Senate Committee on Foreign Relations convened a hearing in 1995 on the trade in human body parts in China; receiving evidence from various sources including statements from Amnesty International, the BBC, and Chinese government documents produced by human rights activist Harry Wu.

The WMA, the Korean Medical Association, and the Chinese Medical Association reached an agreement in 1998 that these practices were undesirable and that they would jointly investigate them with a view to stopping them; however, in 2000, the Chinese withdrew their cooperation. Amnesty International claimed to have strong evidence that the police, courts, and hospitals were complicit in the organ trade, facilitated by the use of mobile execution chambers, or "death vans". Amnesty speculated that this profitable trade might explain China's refusal to consider abolishing the death penalty, which is used on between 1,770 (official figure) and 8,000 (Amnesty estimates) prisoners annually. Corpses are typically cremated before relatives or independent witnesses can view them, fuelling suspicions about the fate of internal organs.

In June 2001, Wang Guoqi (王國齊), a Chinese doctor applying for political asylum, made contact with Harry Wu and his Laogai Research Foundation, who assisted Wang in testifying to the US Congress in writing that he had removed skin and corneas from more than 100 executed prisoners for the transplant market at the Tianjin Paramilitary Police General Brigade Hospital, and that during at least one such operation the prisoner was still breathing. Wang, a "burns specialist", said that he had also seen other doctors remove vital organs from executed prisoners; and the hospital where he worked sold those organs to foreigners. Harry Wu said that he had gone to "great lengths" to verify Wang's identity and that both the foundation and congressional staff members found the doctor's statements "highly credible".

In December 2005, China's Deputy Health Minister acknowledged that the practice of removing organs from executed prisoners for transplant was widespread—as many as 95% of all organ transplants in China derived from executions, and he promised steps to prevent abuse. In 2006, the WMA demanded that China cease using prisoners as organ donors. According to Time, a transplant brokerage in Japan which organised 30–50 operations annually sourced its organs from executed prisoners in China. Edward McMillan-Scott, vice president of the European Parliament, said he believed that nearly 400 hospitals in China had been involved in the transplant organ trade, with websites advertising kidney transplants for $60,000.

On the eve of a state visit to the United States by General Secretary of the Chinese Communist Party Hu Jintao, the 800-member British Transplantation Society also criticised China's use of death-row prisoners' organs in transplants, on the grounds that as it is impossible to verify that organs are indeed from prisoners who have given consent; the WMA once again condemned the practice on similar grounds. A BBC news report by Rupert Wingfield-Hayes in September 2006 showed negotiations with doctors in No 1 Central Hospital in Tianjin for a liver transplant.

In February 2017, CGTN quoted former vice health minister Huang Jiefu as saying "From January 1, 2015, organ donation from voluntary civilian organ donors has become the only legitimate source of organ transplantations", and Francis Delmonico interpreting this as a ban on "the use of organs from executed prisoners" in January 2015. However, after January 1, 2015, organs from prisoners, including those on death row, can still used for transplants in China with official support, according to Chinese media, doctors and researchers in China and abroad. Critics note this is possible because prisoners are reclassified as citizens.

In 2022, the International Society for Heart and Lung Transplantation (ISHLT) issued a policy statement to exclude transplant-related research involving human donors from China from its publications and scientific meetings due to the amount of evidence showing that the Chinese government stands alone in systematically supporting organ or tissue procurement from executed prisoners, a practice that the ISHLT identifies as a violation of fundamental human rights and the principle of voluntary donation.

=== Allegations of organ harvesting ===
In 2006, allegations that Falun Gong practitioners had been killed to supply China's organ transplant industry prompted an investigation by former Canadian Secretary of State David Kilgour and human rights lawyer David Matas. In July 2006, the Kilgour–Matas report questioned "the source of 41,500 transplants for the six year period 2000 to 2005" and thereby inferred that "the government of China and its agencies in numerous parts of the country, in particular hospitals but also detention centres and 'people's courts', since 1999 have put to death a large but unknown number of Falun Gong prisoners of conscience".

The authors of the Kilgour–Matas report reached their conclusion via circumstantial evidence and inference from this evidence. It included observations of the extremely short wait times for organs in China compared with other countries, indicating that organs were being procured on demand; the rise in the number of annual organ transplants in China corresponded with the onset of the persecution of Falun Gong. An updated version of their report was published as a book in 2009.

In 2014, investigative journalist Ethan Gutmann published the results of his own investigation. Gutmann conducted extensive interviews around with former detainees in Chinese labor camps and prisons, as well as former security officers and medical professionals with knowledge of China's transplant practices. He reported that organ harvesting from political prisoners likely began in Xinjiang province in the 1990s, and then spread nationwide. Gutmann estimates that some 64,000 Falun Gong prisoners may have been killed for their organs between 2000 and 2008.

In December 2006, after not getting assurances from the Chinese government about allegations relating to Chinese prisoners, the two major organ transplant hospitals in Queensland, Australia, stopped transplant training for Chinese surgeons and banned joint research programs into organ transplantation with China.

In July 2006 and April 2007, Chinese officials denied organ harvesting allegations, insisting that China abides by World Health Organization (WHO) principles that prohibit the sale of human organs without written consent from donors.

In May 2008 two United Nations Special Rapporteurs reiterated their previous request for the Chinese authorities to adequately respond to the allegations, and to explain the source of organs which would account for the sudden increase in organ transplants in China since 2000.

On 12 September 2012, the United States House Committee on Foreign Affairs held a hearing on the topic of organ harvesting from prisoners of conscience in China. During the hearing, Gutmann described his interviews with former Chinese prisoners, surgeons and nurses with knowledge of organ harvesting practices.

In 2012, State Organs: Transplant Abuse in China, edited by David Matas and Dr. Torsten Trey, was published with essays by Dr. Gabriel Danovitch, Professor of Medicine, Arthur Caplan, Professor of Bioethics, Dr. Jacob Lavee, cardiothoracic surgeon, Dr. Ghazali Ahmad, Professor Maria Fiatarone Singh, Dr. Torsten Trey, Gutmann and Matas.

Harry Wu, a human rights activist, has questioned the Falun Gong's claims that Falun Gong members are specifically targeted for large-scale organ harvesting.

International human rights lawyer David Matas argued Harry Wu's July 2006 article showed his views in his 21 March letter were formed before completing his investigation, so Wu's views were not based on his full investigation. Further, Harry Wu characterized the volume of organ harvesting Annie described as "technically impossible", but it is technically possible, according to medical expert.

A Chinese government panel denied the allegations in August 2016. Huang Jiefu, chairman of the National Organ Donation and Transplantation Committee, noted that there were 10,057 organ transplantation surgeries performed in China in 2015, accounting for 8.5 per cent of global total, and 8 per cent of drugs used globally, which matches China's national statistics. Michael Millis, professor of Surgery and chief of the Section of Transplantation of the University of Chicago Hospitals, corroborated that China is phasing out the organ transplantation of executed prisoners, and is moving towards a voluntary, donation-based system. José Nuñez, medical officer in charge of global organ transplantation at the WHO, noted that China is reaching global standards in organ transplantation, and believed that in a few years, China will be leading the field.

In June 2021, the Special Procedures of the United Nations Human Rights Council voiced concerns over having “received credible information that detainees from ethnic, linguistic or religious minorities may be forcibly subjected to blood tests and organ examinations such as ultrasound and x-rays, without their informed consent; while other prisoners are not required to undergo such examinations.” The press release stated that UN’s human rights experts “were extremely alarmed by reports of alleged ‘organ harvesting’ targeting minorities, including Falun Gong practitioners, Uyghurs, Tibetans, Muslims and Christians, in detention in China.”

In August 2024, The Diplomat reported its interview with Cheng Pei Ming, the first known survivor of China’s forced organ harvesting. Cheng, a Falun Gong practitioner, recounted how he was subjected to repeated blood tests and a subsequent forced surgery while imprisoned in China and later discovered during medical exams in the U.S. that segments of his liver and a portion of his lung had been surgically removed.

Ethan Gutmann, an employee of the US government think tank Victims of Communism Memorial Foundation, has said that organ harvesting from prisoners of conscience became prevalent in the northwestern province of Xinjiang during the 1990s, when members of the Uyghur ethnic group were targeted in security crackdowns and "strike hard campaigns".

By 1999, Gutmann says that organ harvesting in Xinjiang began to decline precipitously, just as overall rates of organ transplantation nationwide were rising. The same year, the Chinese government launched a nationwide suppression of the Falun Gong spiritual group. Gutmann suggests that the new Falun Gong prisoner population overtook Uyghurs as a major source of organs.

Worries about organ harvesting were renewed when China redoubled its attempts to stamp out extremism and separatism by interning a large portion of the population in the Xinjiang re-education camps.

In June 2019, the China Tribunal, an investigation into forced organ transplantation in China concluded that crimes against humanity had been committed beyond reasonable doubt against China's Uyghur and Falun Gong populations, and that cutting out the hearts and other organs from living victims constitutes one of the worst mass atrocities of this century.

In 2020, Gutmann claimed that at least 25,000 people are killed in Xinjiang for their organs each year, alleging that "fast lanes" were created to streamline the process of movement of human organs in local airports and that crematoria have recently been built throughout the province.

In 2020, a Chinese woman said that Uyghurs were slaughtered on demand to provide halal organs for primarily Saudi customers. She said that in one such instance in 2006, 37 Saudi clients received organs from killed Uyghurs at the Department of Liver Transplantation of Tianjin Taida Hospital. Dr. Enver Tohti, a former oncology surgeon in Xinjiang supported allegations.

== Developments since 2006 ==
In March 2006, the Ministry of Health issued the Interim Provisions on Clinical Application and Management of Human Organ Transplantation, which stipulated that medical centres must meet new requirements for transplant services; the provinces were made responsible for plans for clinical applications. Establishments performing transplantation were thereby obliged to incorporate considerations for ethics, medical and surgical expertise, and intensive care. In April 2006, the Committee of Clinical Application of Human Organ Transplantation Technologies was created to standardise clinical practice; a national summit on clinical management took place in November 2006 which issued a declaration outlining regulatory steps. Professor Guo Shuzhong conducted a series of face transplant experiments in Xijing hospital, leading in April 2006 to the world's first face transplant that included bone. The donor had been declared brain-dead before the operation.

In May 2007, the Regulation on Human Organ Transplantation came into force, banning organ trading and the removal of a person's organs without their prior written consent, and this has been favourably received by the World Health Organization and The Transplantation Society. To curb illegal transplants, doctors involved in commercial trade of organs will face fines and suspensions; only a few hospitals will be certified to perform organ transplants. As a result of a systematic overhaul, the number of institutions approved for transplants has been reduced from more than 600 in 2007 to 87 as at October 2008; another 77 have received provisional approval from the Ministry of Health.

To further combat transplant tourism, the Health Ministry issued a notice in July 2007 in line with the Istanbul Declaration, giving Chinese citizens priority as organ recipients. In October 2007, after several years of discussions with the WHO, the Chinese Medical Association agreed to cease commercial organ collection from condemned prisoners, who would only be able to donate to their immediate relatives. Other safeguards implemented under the legislation include documentation of consent for organ removal from the donor, and review of all death sentences by the Supreme People's Court. Transplant professionals are not involved until death is declared. A symposium among legal and medical professionals was held in April 2008 to discuss the diagnostic criteria for brain death for donors of transplant organs.

A liver-transplant registry system was established in Shanghai, in 2008, which allows the monitoring of the after-care of liver recipients; at the same time a nationwide proposal was announced that would allow people to note on their driving licence that they wish to donate their organs. Despite these initiatives China Daily reported in August 2009 that approximately 65% of transplanted organs still came from death row prisoners, which has been described as "not a proper source for organ transplants" by Vice-Health Minister Huang Jiefu. China's first posthumous organ donation system was jointly launched in March 2010 by the Red Cross and the Ministry of Health. Huang Jiefu announced that the scheme, which will allow people to express their wishes on their driver's licences, would be trialled in 10 pilot regions including the cities of Tianjin, Wuhan and Shenzhen. Funds will be made available for the families of people who voluntarily donate their organs. Chinese authorities say they hope the pilot program's success will reduce the need to take organs from death row prisoners and stem the tide of black market organs. In 2012 China officials stated they plan to phase out organ harvesting of death-row inmates.

In September 2012, the report Organ Harvesting of Religious and Political Dissidents by the Chinese Communist Party presented to the members of a US Congress Subcommittee by Damon Noto, the spokesperson for the organization Doctors Against Forced Organ Harvesting, opined: "Medical doctors outside China have confirmed that their patients have gone to China and received organs from Falun Gong practitioners".

The Hangzhou resolution was promulgated in front of the 2013 China National Transplantation Congress on 31 October 2013 and was presented on 2 November 2013. The resolution vows for the cessation of the harvesting of organs from executed prisoners. While not all transplantation facilities have adopted the resolution, a campaign to eradicate inmate organ harvesting is underway.

In June 2021, Special Rapporteurs to the United Nations Human Rights Council stated that they "were extremely alarmed by reports of alleged 'organ harvesting' targeting minorities, including Falun Gong practitioners, Uyghurs, Tibetans, Muslims and Christians, in detention in China". The Rapporteurs stated that they had "received credible information" of forced blood tests and organ examinations of "ethnic, linguistic or religious minorities" that were not forced on other prisoners. The Rapporteurs called for "China to promptly respond to the allegations of 'organ harvesting' and to allow independent monitoring by international human rights mechanisms".

=== Allegations of data falsification ===
Beginning in 2010, Chinese authorities announced that the country would transition away from the use of prisoners as an organ source, and would rely entirely on voluntary donations coordinated through a centralized registry. By 2015, officials asserted that voluntary donors were the sole source for organ transplants in China. However, critics have pointed to evidence of systematic falsification of data related to voluntary organ donations, casting doubt on reform claims.

In a paper published in the journal BMC Medical Ethics, for instance, researchers analyzed data on voluntary organ transplants from 2010 to 2018. Datasets were drawn from two national sources, several sub-national jurisdictions, and individual Chinese hospitals. The researchers found compelling evidence of "human-directed data manufacture and manipulation" in the national datasets, as well as "contradictory, implausible, or anomalous data artefacts" in the provincial datasets, which suggests that the data "may have been manipulated to enforce conformity with central quotas." Among the findings was that the purported rate of growth in voluntary donations was derived from a simple quadratic equation, with nearly perfect model parsimony. These findings appear to undermine official claims about the extent of voluntary organ donations in China. The authors of the BMC Medical Ethics article also note that China's model parsimony is one to two orders of magnitude smoother than any other nation's, even those that have experienced rapid growth in their organ transplantation sector.

== Wait times ==
China has by far the shortest wait times for organ transplants in the world, and there is evidence that the execution of prisoners for their organs is "timed for the convenience of the waiting recipient." As of 2006, organ tourists to China report receiving kidney transplants within days of arriving in China. A report produced by David Matas and David Kilgour cites the China International Transplantation Assistant Centre website as saying "it may take only one week to find out the suitable (kidney) donor, the maximum time being one month..." It is possible for international buyers to schedule their surgeries in advance which is not possible in systems which rely on voluntary organ donation.

By way of comparison, the median waiting time for an organ transplantation in Australia is six months to four years. In Canada, it is six years as of 2011. In the UK, it is three years.

== See also ==
- Experimentation on prisoners
