= Bloody Harvest =

Bloody Harvest may refer to:

- Harvest Bloody Harvest, a music DVD released by Red Harvest
- The Kilgour-Matas report into allegations of organ harvesting of Falun Gong practitioners, a revised version of which was published under the title Bloody Harvest
