= Kilgour–Matas report =

Report on forced organ harvesting in China

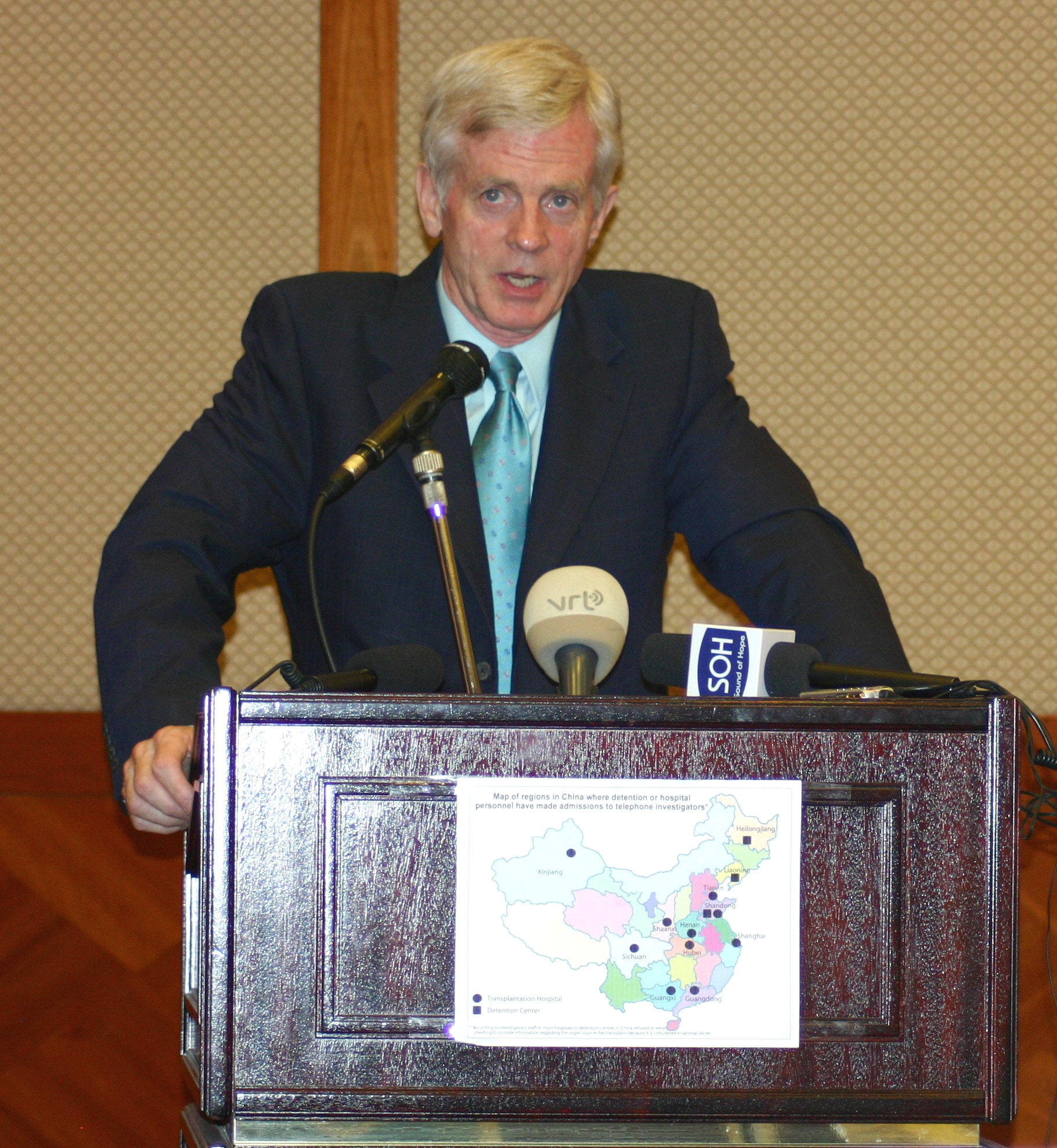
David Kilgour, former Canadian Secretary of State (Asia-Pacific), investigated the state-sanctioned forced organ harvesting in China.

The Kilgour–Matas report is a 2006/2007 investigative report into allegations of live organ harvesting in China conducted by Canadian MP David Kilgour and human rights lawyer David Matas. The report was requested by the Coalition to Investigate the Persecution of Falun Gong (CIPFG), a US-based organisation founded by the Falun Dafa Association, after allegations emerged that Falun Gong practitioners were secretly having their organs removed against their will at Sujiatun Thrombosis Hospital. The report, based on limited evidence, concluded that "there has been, and continues today to be, large-scale organ seizures from unwilling Falun Gong practitioners." China has consistently denied the allegations.

According to US Congressional Research Service (CRS), the Kilgour-Matas report did not introduce new or independently-obtained testimony and relied largely upon the making of logical inferences. CRS also noted that the conclusion of the report had heavily relied on the transcripts of telephone conversations allegedly made by CIFPG members from outside China to PRC detention centres, hospitals and police bureaus, in which call respondents had reportedly indicated that it was a common practice to harvest organs from live Falun Gong detainees.

The initial 6 July 2006 report found that, "the source of 41,500 transplants for the six-year period 2000 to 2005 is unexplained" and concluded that "there has been and continues today to be large scale organ seizures from unwilling Falun Gong practitioners." U.N. special rapporteur Manfred Nowak said in March 2007 that the chain of evidence Kilgour and Matas were documenting showed a "coherent picture that causes concern", which the United Nations Committee Against Torture followed up in November 2008 with a request for "a full explanation of the source of organ transplants", to investigate the claims of organ harvesting, and to take measures to prosecute those committing abuses. Other investigators, such as Ethan Gutmann, followed the Kilgour–Matas report; Gutmann estimating that between 450,000 and 1 million Falun Gong members were detained at any given time, and estimated that tens of thousands may have been targeted for organ harvesting.

Upon release of the initial report on 6 July 2006, Chinese officials declared that China abides by World Health Organization principles that prohibit the sale of human organs without written consent from donors. They denounced the report as smears "based on rumours and false allegations", and said the Chinese government had already investigated the claims and found them without any merit. The report is banned in Russia and China. Among international concerns, the US National Kidney Foundation expressed that it was "deeply concerned" about the allegations.

In 2009, the authors published an updated version of the report as a book, titled Bloody Harvest, The killing of Falun Gong for their organs, and in the same year received an award from the International Society for Human Rights.

== Background ==
=== Falun Gong ===
Falun Gong is a spiritual discipline that combines meditation and exercises with a moral philosophy, emerged in China in the 1990s; by 1999 the number of practitioners was estimated in the tens of millions.

In July 1999, following a large-scale demonstration to request official recognition, Chinese authorities initiated a nationwide campaign to suppress the group, and created the 610 Office to oversee and coordinate the elimination of Falun Gong. The suppression that followed was accompanied by what Amnesty International called a "massive propaganda campaign", as well as the detention and imprisonment of tens of thousands of Falun Gong adherents. Former detainees reported that in some labour camps, Falun Gong practitioners comprised the majority population, and were singled out for abuse. Under order from Beijing, practitioners are subject to coercive "reeducation" and torture, sometimes resulting in deaths. Due to limited access to victims and labour camp facilities, however, many specific reports of abuses are difficult to independently corroborate.

=== Organ transplantation in China ===
China has had an organ transplantation programme since the 1960s. It is one of the largest organ transplant programmes in the world, peaking at over 13,000 transplants a year in 2004. Involuntary organ harvesting is illegal under Chinese law, although under a 1984 regulation it became legal to remove organs from executed criminals with the prior consent of the criminal or permission of relatives. By the 1990s, growing concerns about possible ethical abuses arising from coerced consent and corruption led medical groups and human rights organizations to start condemning the practice. These concerns resurfaced in 2001, when The Washington Post reported claims by a Chinese asylum-seeking doctor that he had taken part in organ extraction operations.

By 2005 the World Medical Association had specifically demanded that China cease using prisoners as organ donors. In December of that year, China's Deputy Health Minister acknowledged that the practice of removing organs from executed prisoners for transplant was widespread – as many as 95% of all organ transplants in China derived from executions, and he promised steps to prevent abuse.

=== Sujiatun ===
The first allegations of systematic organ harvesting from Falun Gong practitioners were made in March 2006 by two individuals claiming to possess knowledge of involuntary organ extractions at the Sujiatun Thrombosis Hospital in Shenyang, Liaoning province. Within one month of press coverage, third party investigators, including representatives of the US Department of State, said that there was insufficient evidence to prove the allegations. In 2006 and 2008, United Nations Special Rapporteurs raised questions about the sources of organs, the short waiting times for finding perfectly matched organs, and the correlation between the sudden increase in organ transplants in China and the beginning of the persecution of Falun Gong practitioners. These requests were not satisfactorily addressed by the Chinese authorities. In November 2008 the United Nations Committee Against Torture noted its concern at the allegations and called for China to "immediately conduct or commission an independent investigation of the claims", and take measures "to ensure that those responsible for such abuses are prosecuted and punished". Chinese dissident Harry Wu, who exposed organ harvesting from prison inmates at laogai (hard labour camps), questioned the credibility of the Sujiatun whistle-blowers. But Harry Wu's July 2006 article showed his views in his 21 March letter were formed before completing his investigation, and were not based on his full investigation. Further, Harry Wu characterized the volume of organ harvesting described by the pseudonymous informant "Annie" as "technically impossible", but in fact it is technically possible, according to the Matas/Kilgour report. On 14 April 2006, the US state department wrote that "U.S. representatives have found no evidence to support allegations that a site in northeast China has been used as a concentration camp to jail Falun Gong practitioners and harvest their organs", adding "independent of these specific allegations, the United States remains concerned over China’s repression of Falun Gong practitioners and by reports of organ harvesting."

Soon thereafter, in May 2006, The Coalition to Investigate the Persecution of Falun Gong asked David Kilgour as well as Canadian human rights lawyer David Matas to investigate the broader allegations of organ harvesting from Falun Gong adherents in China. Kilgour and Matas agreed to investigate.

== The report ==
=== First report ===
On 20 July 2006, Kilgour and Matas presented the findings of their two-month investigation as Report into Allegations of Organ Harvesting of Falun Gong Practitioners in China. The report presented 33 strands of circumstantial evidence that Kilgour and Matas felt, in the absence of any disproof, cumulatively allowed the conclusion that "the government of China and its agencies in numerous parts of the country, in particular hospitals but also detention centres and 'people's courts', since 1999 have put to death a large but unknown number of Falun Gong prisoners of conscience. Their vital organs, including kidneys, livers, corneas and hearts, were seized involuntarily for sale at high prices, sometimes to foreigners, who normally face long waits for voluntary donations of such organs in their home countries". The report called attention to the extremely short wait times for organs in China – one to two weeks for a liver compared with 32.5 months in Canada – noting that this was indicative of organs being procured on demand. It also tracked a significant increase in the number of annual organ transplants in China beginning in 1999, corresponding with the onset of the persecution of Falun Gong. Despite very low levels of voluntary organ donation, China performs the second-highest number of transplants per year. Kilgour and Matas also presented material from Chinese transplant center web sites advertising the immediate availability of organs from living donors, and transcripts of telephone interviews in which hospitals told prospective transplant recipients that they could obtain Falun Gong organs. The authors qualified their findings by noting the difficulties in verifying the alleged crimes, such as: independent bodies were not allowed to investigate conditions in China, eyewitness evidence was difficult to obtain, official information about organ transplantation was often withheld, and Kilgour and Matas themselves were denied visas to go to China to investigate.

=== Second report ===
In a January 2007 revision, Bloody Harvest: Revised Report into Allegations of Organ Harvesting of Falun Gong Practitioners in China, Kilgour and Matas felt that the Government of China had reinforced the basis of the first report by responding to it in an unpersuasive way, mostly as attacks on Falun Gong. Kilgour and Matas believed such attacks made possible the violation of the basic human rights of Falun Gong practitioners. China identified two factual errors in the first version of the report – one in an appendix, in a caption heading, where Kilgour and Matas placed two Chinese cities in the wrong provinces; the authors dismissed those errors as having nothing to do with the analysis or conclusions of their report. In the absence of evidence that would invalidate the organ harvesting allegations – such as a Chinese government registry showing the identity of every organ donor and their donation – Kilgour and Matas concluded that the allegations of China's harvesting organs from live Falun Gong practitioners were true and the practice was ongoing. They called for a ban on Canadian citizens traveling to China for transplant operations.

As of November 2014 the report has been translated into 21 languages.

=== Books ===
In 2009, Kilgour and Matas published an updated version of the report as a book, titled Bloody Harvest, The killing of Falun Gong for their organs. It contains new material and interviews, and is in two parts. The first section sets out the evidence; the second section details the reactions the final report received and the advocacy Matas and Kilgour undertook to end the abuse that they conclusively identified. That year, Kilgour and Matas also received the 2009 Human Rights Award by the German-based International Society for Human Rights; and were nominated for the 2010 Nobel Peace Prize.

In 2012, State Organs: Transplant Abuse in China, edited by David Matas and Torsten Trey was published with contributions from a dozen specialists.

== Response ==
The report's allegations of involuntary organ removal from Falun Gong adherents received considerable media coverage, particularly in Canada, Europe, and Australia. Several governments tightened transplant tourism practices and requested more information from the Chinese government. Chinese officials repeatedly denied the report's organ harvesting allegations. Upon release of the initial report, China declared they abided by World Health Organization principles that prohibit the sale of human organs without written consent from donors and denounced the report.

Amnesty International in 2006 said it was "continuing to analyze sources of information" about the allegations. David Ownby, a professor of history at the University of Montreal and expert on Falun Gong, wrote in Falun Gong and the Future of China that Falun Gong practitioners were probable candidates for organ harvesting in Chinese prisons. However, he felt that Falun Gong spokespersons "overplayed their hand" with the concentration camp allegations, potentially losing credibility in the eyes of neutral observers, despite the real persecution they were suffering.

A Congressional Research Service (CRS) report by Thomas Lum, a specialist in Asian Affairs, said that the report relies on logical inferences and its conclusions heavily relied on the transcripts of telephone calls that were sourced from the Coalition to Investigate the Persecution of the Falun Gong (CIPFG), a group founded by Falun Dafa Association in April 2006. In these phone calls, CIPFG members had allegedly contacted Chinese hospitals, police bureaus, and detention centres, and respondents reportedly stated that the harvesting of organs from living Falun Gong detainees was common. However, the CRS report suggested that it was "unlikely" that phone respondents would have displayed such "apparent candour", given Chinese government controls over sensitive information, raising questions about the credibility of the transcripts. Glen McGregor of the Ottawa Citizen was skeptical about the logistical plausibility of the allegations after visiting Sujiatun at the invitation of the Chinese Medical Association. He said that, depending on whom you believe, "the Kilgour–Matas report is either compelling evidence that proves the claims about Falun Gong ... or a collection of conjecture and inductive reasoning that fails to support its own conclusions".

Some observers found the report and its figures plausible. Tom Treasure of Guy's Hospital, London, said the Kilgour–Matas report was "plausible from a medical standpoint" based on the numerical gap in the number of transplants and the short waiting times in China compared with other countries. He noted the existence of blood tests of imprisoned Falun Gong followers, which is not useful for the victims but is critical to organ donation, and said the allegations were "credible". Non-fiction writer Scott Carney included the allegations in his book The Red Market, writing "No one is saying the Chinese government went after the Falun Gong specifically for their organs... but it seems to have been a remarkably convenient and profitable way to dispose of them. Dangerous political dissidents were executed while their organs created a comfortable revenue stream for hospitals and surgeons, and presumably many important Chinese officials received organs." Using different research methods to Kilgour and Matas, Ethan Gutmann, adjunct fellow at the Foundation for Defense of Democracies, found that his estimate of the number of Falun Gong practitioners killed for organs of approximately 65,000 was close to the estimate of 62,250 by Kilgour and Matas. In September 2014 he published his findings in The Slaughter: Mass Killings, Organ Harvesting, and China’s Secret Solution to Its Dissident Problem. Kirk C. Allison, associate director of the Program in Human Rights and Medicine in the University of Minnesota, wrote that the "short time frame of an on-demand system [as in China] requires a large pool of donors pre-typed for blood group and HLA matching," and would be consistent with the Falun Gong allegations about the systematic tissue typing of practitioners held prisoner. He wrote that the time constraints involved "cannot be assured on a random-death basis", and that physicians he queried about the matter indicated that they were selecting live prisoners to ensure quality and compatibility.

The US National Kidney Foundation said they were "deeply concerned about recent allegations regarding the procurement of organs and tissues through coercive or exploitative practices" and that "any act which calls the ethical practice of donation and transplantation into question should be condemned by the worldwide transplantation community." A 2008 petition signed by 140 Canadian physicians urged the Canadian Government to "issue travel advisories warning Canadians that organ transplants in China are sourced almost entirely from non-consenting people, whether prisoners sentenced to death or Falun Gong practitioners". Canadian Member of Parliament Borys Wrzesnewskyj, based on the findings of the Kilgour–Matas report, introduced a 2008 bill that would make it illegal for Canadians to get an organ transplant abroad if the organ was taken from an unwilling victim. In 2013, Doctors Against forced Organ Harvesting (DAFOH) presented a petition of nearly 1.5 million signatures including over 300,000 from Europe to the Office of UN High Commissioner on Human Rights in Geneva.

While Russia, along with China, banned the report; Taiwan condemned, "in the strongest possible terms", China's harvesting of human organs from executed Falun Gong practitioners. Taiwan's Department of Health, urged Taiwanese doctors to not encourage patients to get commercial organ transplants in mainland China. Rabbi Yosef Shalom Eliashiv prohibited Jews from deriving any benefit from Chinese organ harvesting, "even in life-threatening situations"; other rabbis opposed the use of Chinese organs for transplants.

In 2006 and 2008, United Nations Special Rapporteurs raised questions about the sources of organs, the short waiting times for finding perfectly matched organs, and the correlation between the sudden increase in organ transplants in China and the beginning of the persecution of Falun Gong practitioners. These requests were not satisfactorily addressed by the Chinese authorities. In November 2008 the United Nations Committee Against Torture noted its concern at the allegations and called for China to "immediately conduct or commission an independent investigation of the claims", and take measures "to ensure that those responsible for such abuses are prosecuted and punished".

In 2010, though the Chinese Medical Society had stated that organ transplants from executed prisoners must cease, and changes in Chinese regulations prohibited transplant tourism, a meeting of the Transplantation Society received over 30 papers containing data from several hundred transplants, where the donor source was likely executed prisoners.

During the U.N. Human Rights Council meeting held on 12 March 2014, Anne-Tamara Lorre, the Canadian representative on human rights to the United Nations, raised the issue of organ harvesting in China. "We remain concerned that Falun Gong practitioners and other religious worshippers in China face persecution, and reports that organ transplants take place without free and informed consent of the donor are troubling."

== See also ==
- 2009 Aftonbladet Israel controversy
- Human Harvest, Peabody Awards winner documentary
- Murder for body parts

== Bibliography ==
- Gutmann, Ethan, "China's Gruesome Organ Harvest. The whole world isn't watching. Why not? ", 24 November 2008, The Weekly Standard
- Kilgour, David & Matas, David, The First Report into Allegations of Organ Harvesting of Falun Gong Practitioners in China, 6 July 2006, organharvestinvestigation.net
- Kilgour, David & Matas, David, Bloody Harvest: Revised Report into Allegations of Organ Harvesting of Falun Gong Practitioners in China, 31 January 2007, organharvestinvestigation.net
- Matas, David & Trey, Torsten, State Organs: Transplant Abuse in China, 2012, Seraphim Edition
- Pan, Philip & Pomfret, John, Torture is Breaking Falun Gong, 5 August 2000, The Washington Post
- Spiegel, Mickey (January 2002). Dangerous Meditation: China's Campaign Against Falungong (Report). Human Rights Watch.
- Treasure, Tom, The Falun Gong, organ transplantation, the holocaust and ourselves, March 2007, Journal of the Royal Society of Medicine
