= Ethan Gutmann =

American investigative writer (born 1958)

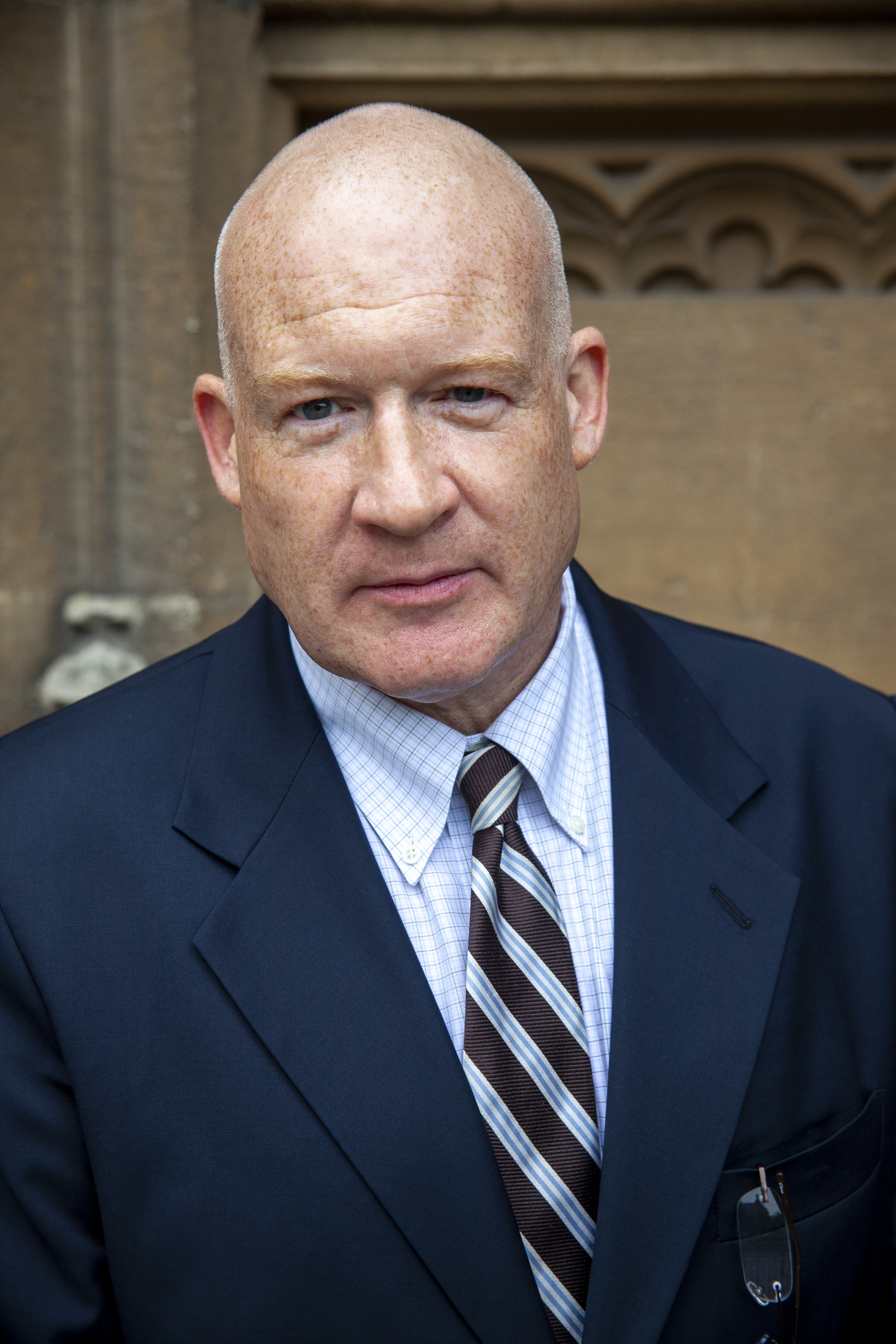
- Ethan Gutmann outside the Palace of Westminster, London, 2010
- Born: 13 September 1958 (age 68); Chicago, Illinois, U.S.
- Education: Columbia University (BA, MIA)
- Occupation: Investigative writer
- Writing career
- Subject: China human rights

Ethan Gutmann (born September 13, 1958) is an American writer, researcher, author, and a senior research fellow in China Studies at the Victims of Communism Memorial Foundation whose work has investigated surveillance and organ harvesting in China.

== Early life and education ==
Gutmann was born in Chicago, Illinois, and grew up in Ann Arbor, Michigan, and Wallingford, Vermont. He has also lived in the UK, China, Israel and Mexico.

Gutmann graduated from Cranbrook Boys' School in Bloomfield Hills, Michigan, and earned a Bachelor of Arts and a Master of International Affairs at Columbia University.

== Investigations of China ==
Gutmann's writing on China includes three books, Losing the New China: A Story of American Commerce, Desire and Betrayal, The Slaughter: Mass Killings, Organ Harvesting, and China's Secret Solution to Its Dissident Problem and The Xinjiang Procedure. He also co-authored an extensive report on China's annual transplant volume, Bloody Harvest/The Slaughter: An Update.

Gutmann has testified before the U.S. Congress, the European Parliament, and the United Nations.

He is a co-founder of the International Coalition to End Transplant Abuse in China (ETAC) and is a China Studies research fellow at the Victims of Communism Memorial Foundation.

=== Golden Shield surveillance ===
In 2011, two lawsuits citing Gutmann's work were filed in U.S. federal courts against Cisco Systems, alleging that its technology enabled the government of China to monitor, capture, and kill Chinese adherents of the Falun Gong new religious movement. Evidence of Cisco's activities in China had become public in Gutmann's book Losing the New China: A Story of American Commerce, Desire and Betrayal. In 2014, the federal district court in San Jose dismissed the case, saying the plaintiffs failed to prove that Cisco was aware of its products being used for oppression.

=== Organ harvesting in China ===
From 2006, Gutmann wrote articles about organ harvesting. In 2012, "State Organs: Transplant Abuse in China", was published with essays from six medical professionals, David Matas and Gutmann.

Gutmann wrote that he interviewed over 100 witnesses including Falun Gong survivors, doctors, policemen, and camp administrators. He estimated that 65,000 Falun Gong practitioners were killed for their organs from 2000 to 2008, and that between 450,000 and 1 million Falun Gong practitioners were detained at any given time. Gutmann told the Toronto Star in 2014 that in total "the number of casualties is close to 100,000". While widely accepted by Congress, Gutmann's numbers were disputed by the Washington Post, which relied on methods assuming accurate reporting of drug production and use in China.

Gutmann was one of the key interviewees in Human Harvest, a 2014 Peabody Award winning documentary on organ harvesting in China, as well as the PBS documentary Hard to Believe (2015).

In August 2014, Gutmann wrote The Slaughter: Mass Killings, Organ Harvesting, and China's Secret Solution to Its Dissident Problem, which described China's organ transplant business and its connection with internment camps and killing fields for arrested dissidents, especially the adherents of Falun Gong. The new book, which took seven years, was based on interviews with top-ranking police officials, former prisoners of conscience and Chinese doctors who killed prisoners on the operating table. Gutmann interviewed dissidents including of Falun Gong, Tibetans, Uyghurs and House Christians.

In 2016, Gutmann, David Kilgour, and David Matas authored an updated investigative report on China's organ harvesting from prisoners of conscience. The 700-page report contained information on transplant statistics sourced to Chinese hospitals' publications and other Chinese primary sources.

Gutmann has said that China is organ harvesting from Uyghurs in its prison camps in the Xinjiang region. In November 2020, Gutmann told Radio Free Asia that a hospital in Aksu, China, allowing local officials to streamline the organ harvesting process and provide a steady stream of harvested organs from Uyghurs. Gutmann told Haaretz that individuals detained in the Xinjiang re-education camps "are being murdered and their organs harvested", that at least 25,000 Uyghurs are killed in Xinjiang for their organs each year, that crematoria have been built throughout the province to dispose of victims' bodies, and that China has created “fast lanes” for the movement of human organs in local airports. In Congressional testimony, Gutmann estimated that 2.5 to 5 percent of Uyghur detainees have been selected for organ harvesting in the camps. The estimate was used by Congressman Chris Smith in support of the Stop Forced Organ Harvesting Act of 2023.

== Controversies in Taiwan ==
=== 2014 Taipei mayoral election ===
During the 2014 Taipei City mayoral election campaign, there was controversy about what Gutmann's book, The Slaughter: Mass Killings, Organ Harvesting, and China's Secret Solution to Its Dissident Problem, published in August 2014, said about mayoral candidate Ko Wen-je. The Taipei Times reported that Ko had been forced to deny that he had bought organs from China. Gutmann stated he had not said that Ko was involved in the organ trade and that he might have been misinterpreted. On 27 November, Gutmann's lawyer, Clive Ansley, released a statement; it said, "no English-speaking reader to date has understood for one moment that Dr. Ko was acting as an 'organ broker'," and, "We believe that language, translation, and the heated environment of the political campaign for the mayoral race in Taipei may be playing a role in misconstruing the author's intentions and clouding the issue."

Gutmann provided a full explanation, including the actual email correspondence where Ko signed off on the story for publication, in December.

=== 2018 Taipei mayoral election ===
In the 2018 Taipei City mayoral election, there was a controversy regarding Gutmann's book and his statement in 2014. Wu Hsiang-hui, a political pundit, claimed that Ko had known that many organs transplanted in China came from Falun Gong members. In a news conference in Taipei on 2 October 2018, Gutmann was asked if he thought Ko was a liar, to which he replied “yes”. The Taipei Times wrote, "Gutmann showed a group photograph of Ko attending a conference on Extracorporeal Membrane Oxygenation training in China and said Ko had told him he knew about organ harvesting of Falun Gong members in 2005, but Gutmann had discovered that the conference took place only three months before he interviewed Ko."

In response, Ko said that Gutmann had already made a written statement in 2014 to clarify that Ko was not acting as an “organ broker” and that Ko was categorically not involved in purchasing organs. Ko sued Gutmann and Wu for defamation. The Taipei District Prosecutor's Office announced on 27 August 2020 that it would not prosecute due to insufficient evidence. Regarding the prosecutor's decision, Ko said, "[Gutmann] came to Taiwan, how is there no intention of committing [defamation]?"

In March 2026, former Taipei Mayor Ko Wen-je was sentenced to 17 years in prison and stripped of his civil rights for 6 years for the Core Pacific City scandal. Author Gutmann, who investigated the CCP's large-scale organ harvesting and criticized Ko as a "liar," responded, "This is his true destiny, and now, it has become his place in history."

== Views ==
=== Falun Gong issues ===
In 2012 Gutmann stated, "There is a long-standing taboo in the journalism community about Falun Gong, about this issue [organ harvesting]. To touch this issue is the Third Rail of journalism. If you touch it—if you are in Beijing, if you are based in China—you will not be given access to top leaders anymore."

=== Uyghur issues ===
In 2021 Gutmann stated, “A woman gave a confidential interview where she described a health check in her camp followed by three women disappearing in the middle of the night over the next week. To rule out sexual slavery, I explained that I was going to ask her an impolite question: ‘were these women beautiful? Were they sexually attractive?’ She responded, ‘It is not nice to say this, but, no, they were not.’ ‘How would you describe them, then? Did they have anything in common?’ ‘They were healthy’, she replied.”

Based partially on Gutmann's research, through their links at the Hudson Institute, in 2020, then Secretary of State Mike Pompeo officially determined that China was committing genocide against the Uyghur and other Turkic Muslim communities. In 2026 Congressman Chris Smith sponsored HR 1503, the Stop Forced Organ Harvesting Act, which is now awaiting Senate consideration.

== Reception ==
=== Books ===
Jay Nordlinger, a senior editor of National Review, wrote that Gutmann's 2004 book Losing the New China: A Story of American Commerce, Desire and Betrayal "was about the sordid relationship between the American business community and the Chinese Communist Party. Our businessmen accommodate themselves to the Communist Party, and turn a blind eye to persecution." Sometimes they even assist the persecution, as when Cisco and other technology companies devised special ways to monitor and arrest Falun Gong practitioners".

Nordlinger called Gutmann's 2014 book The Slaughter: Mass Killings, Organ Harvesting, and China's Secret Solution to Its Dissident Problem "another atom bomb".

== Books ==
- Losing the New China: A Story of American Commerce, Desire, and Betrayal, (2004) ISBN 978-1893554832
- The Slaughter: Mass Killings, Organ Harvesting and China's Secret Solution to Its Dissident Problem, (2014) ISBN 978-1616149406
- Gutmann, Ethan (2026). The Xinjiang Procedure. Estes Park, CO: Armin Lear Press. ISBN 978-1-968919-22-1.

== Documentaries ==
Gutmann appeared in Transmission 6–10 (2009), Red Reign: The Bloody Harvest of China's Prisoners (2013), Human Harvest (2014) and Hard to Believe (2015)

== Awards ==
Gutmann's first book Losing the New China won the "Spirit of Tiananmen" award from the Visual Artists Guild, was listed as one of The New York Sun's "Books of the Year" and won the "Chan's Journalism Award". In 2017, Gutmann was nominated for a Nobel Peace Prize, according to articles in Haaretz and The Journal.ie.

== See also ==
- Adrian Zenz
- Edward McMillan-Scott
- Arthur Caplan
- Dana Rohrabacher
- Chris Smith
- Ileana Ros-Lehtinen
- Organ harvesting from Falun Gong practitioners in China
