= Sujiatun Thrombosis Hospital =

Geography
- Location: 49 Xuesong Road, Sujiatun District, Shenyang, Liaoning, China
- Coordinates: 41.665614°N 123.333579°E

Organisation
- Funding: Public hospital
- Type: General
- Affiliated university: Liaoning University of Traditional Chinese Medicine

Services
- Beds: 300

History
- Opened: December 1988

Links
- Lists: Hospitals in China

Location of Liaoning, the province in which the Sujiatun hospital is located

The Sujiatun Thrombosis Hospital, officially known as the Liaoning Provincial Thrombosis Treatment Center of Integrated Chinese and Western Medicine, is a public hospital opened in December 1988 in the Sujiatun district of Shenyang, in northeast China. The hospital is a joint venture with a company associated with the Malaysian government, and has gained several awards for research.

In March 2006, 3 allegations emerged that the hospital was being used for live organ harvesting from about 6,000 Falun Gong practitioners being held prisoner, though a U.S investigation found no evidence supporting their claims.

== Hospital ==
Sujiatun Thrombosis Hospital was opened in December 1988 as the Shenyang Research Institute of Thrombosis and Liaoning Province Thrombosis Treatment Center of Integrated Chinese and Western Medicine. It is a thrombosis treatment centre approved by the State Administration of Traditional Chinese Medicine, a class A Grade three hospital, a national Traditional Chinese Medicine (TCM) hospital, the general hospital for the Liaoning province and a teaching hospital for the Liaoning University of TCM.

The total hospital site is 21,087 square meters. The hospital has 27 clinical departments employing 460 people, and has 300 beds.

The hospital has been granted several awards for research, including the Gold Prize at the 9th Inventions Exhibition and the Gold Cup Prize of China Excellent Invention Result. In November 2001, research at the hospital was awarded the Gold Prize at the 50th World Exhibition of Innovation, Research and New Technologies in Brussels.

== Organ harvesting allegations ==
In March 2006, the Falun Gong-backed Epoch Times published allegations by three individuals that thousands of Falun Gong practitioners had been killed at Sujiatun Thrombosis Hospital to supply China's organ transplant industry. The claim came against a background of international concern regarding China's transplantation programme and the persecution of Falun Gong.

Within a month, U.S. representatives said they found no evidence that a site in northeast China had been used as a concentration camp, though "the United States remained concerned over China's repression of Falun Gong practitioners and by reports of organ harvesting". Harry Wu, a Chinese dissident and human rights activist, said that "no concrete or substantiated evidence, such as documents or photos, have been provided to support the witness' statements".
