= David Kilgour =

Canadian human rights activist and politician (1941–2022)

The Honourable David Kilgour PC
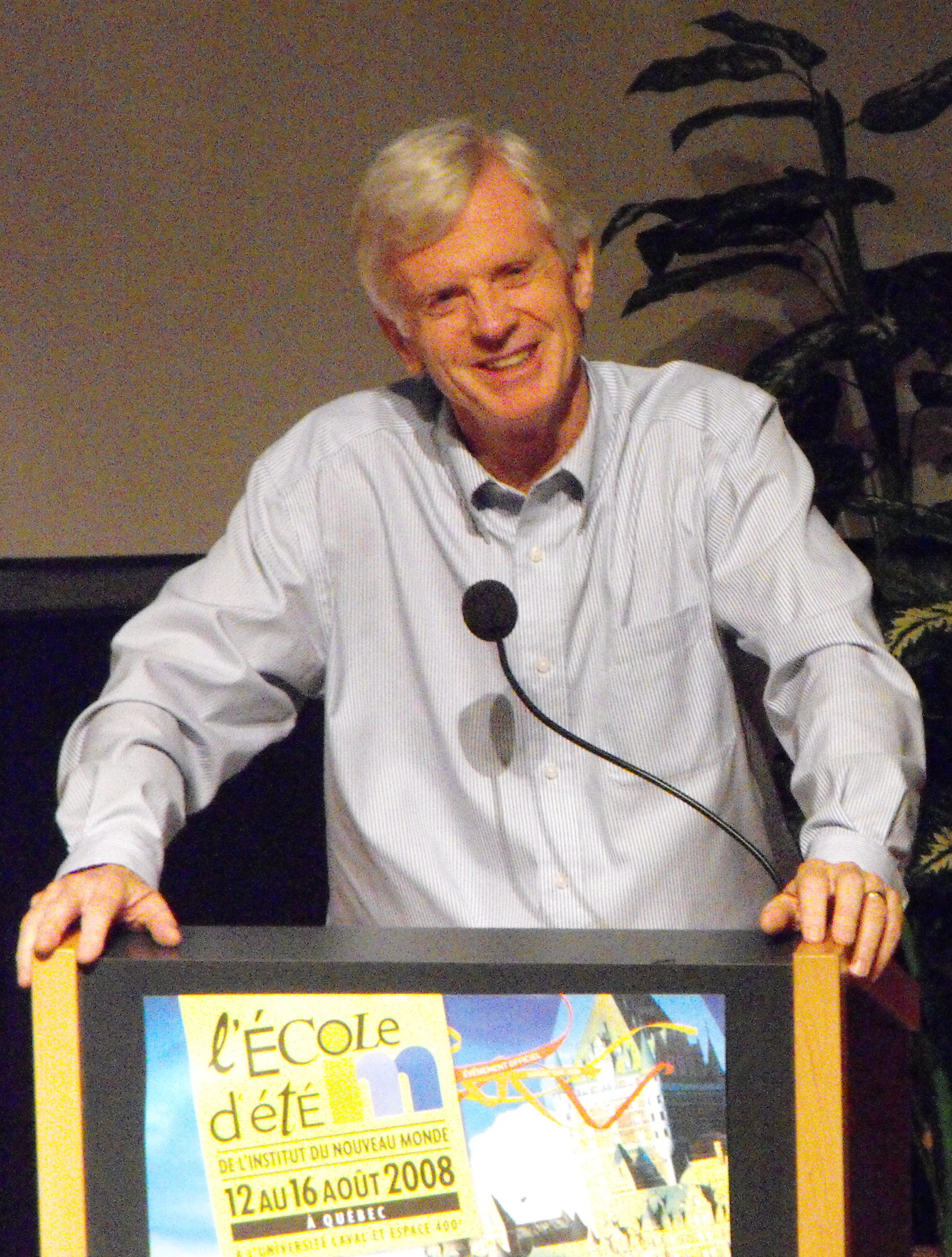
- Kilgour in 2008

Secretary of State (Asia Pacific)
- In office January 15, 2002 – December 12, 2003
- Prime Minister: Jean Chrétien
- Minister: Bill Graham
- Preceded by: Rey Pagtakhan
- Succeeded by: Position abolished

Secretary of State (Latin America and Africa)
- In office June 11, 1997 – January 14, 2002
- Prime Minister: Jean Chrétien
- Minister: Lloyd Axworthy; John Manley
- Preceded by: Christine Stewart
- Succeeded by: Denis Paradis

Deputy Speaker of the House of Commons of Canada Chairman of Committees of the Whole
- In office January 18, 1994 – April 27, 1997
- Speaker: Gilbert Parent
- Preceded by: Andrée Champagne (1993)
- Succeeded by: Peter Milliken

Member of Parliament for Edmonton—Mill Woods—Beaumont (Edmonton–Beaumont; 2004) (Edmonton Southeast; 1988–2004) (Edmonton—Strathcona; 1979–1988)
- In office May 22, 1979 – January 23, 2006
- Preceded by: Douglas Roche
- Succeeded by: Mike Lake

Personal details
- Born: David William Kilgour; February 18, 1941 Winnipeg, Manitoba, Canada
- Died: April 5, 2022 (aged 81) Ottawa, Ontario, Canada
- Party: Independent (2005–2006)
- Other political affiliations: Progressive Conservative (1979–1990); Liberal (1990–2005)
- Relatives: Geills Turner (sister)
- Education: University of Manitoba; University of Toronto Faculty of Law
- Profession: Politician; lawyer; author

David William Kilgour PC (February 18, 1941 – April 5, 2022) was a Canadian human rights activist, author, lawyer, and politician. He also served as a senior fellow to the Raoul Wallenberg Centre for Human Rights.

Kilgour earned a degree in economics from the University of Manitoba in 1962 and a law degree from the University of Toronto in 1966. His career spanned roles from a crown attorney in northern Alberta to Canadian Cabinet minister. He concluded his 27-year tenure in the House of Commons of Canada as an independent MP. Upon retirement, he was one of the longest-serving members of parliament and one of the few who had been elected under both the Progressive Conservative and Liberal banners.

== Politics ==
Kilgour unsuccessfully sought election in 1968 in the riding of Vancouver Centre as a Progressive Conservative. He ran again in the 1979 election, winning a seat in Edmonton. He went on to serve as a Member of Parliament for about 27 years. During his 27-year tenure, he crossed the floor two times, sitting first as a Conservative, then as an independent, and finally as a Liberal.

In the Conservative governments of Joe Clark and Brian Mulroney he served as parliamentary secretary to the president of the Privy Council, the Minister for CIDA, the Minister of Indian and Northern Affairs, and the Minister of Transport.

In April 1990, he was expelled from the Tory national caucus after criticizing Mulroney's government's policies. He sat as an independent for several months, before joining the Liberals.

In the Liberal government, he served as the Deputy Speaker (1993–1997) and Chairman of Committees of the Whole of the House of Commons, Secretary of state (Latin America and Africa) (1997–2002), and Secretary of State (Asia-Pacific) (2002–2003).

As a Secretary of state, Kilgour was vocal on many human rights violations around the world. In 2001 while visiting Zimbabwe, Kilgour was vocally critical of Robert Mugabe's farm-invasions policy and pushed for increasing international pressure. In December 2004, he was among the Ukrainian election monitor delegation of the federal run-off elections.

In April 2005, he received media attention when he speculated about quitting the Liberal Party because of his disgust with the sponsorship scandal, saying that the issue made Canada look like "a northern banana republic". On April 12, 2005, he announced that he would sit as an independent MP. He also cited Canada's lack of action on the crisis in Darfur, Sudan, as reasons for quitting. He asserted that he had no plans to either join the reorganized Conservative Party of Canada or to run for re-election.

From 1979 to 1988, he represented the riding of Edmonton Strathcona, but with shifting constituency lines moved to Edmonton Southeast in 1988, and then again to Edmonton—Mill Woods—Beaumont in 2004, which he represented until he retired from politics at the 2006 election.

Because of the unusual structure of the 38th House of Commons, in May 2005, David Kilgour's lone vote had the power to bring down or support the government. He used this influence to urge the Martin government to send peacekeepers to Darfur. He was an endorser of the Genocide Intervention Network. Prime Minister Paul Martin agreed to send humanitarian support but in the end, no peacekeepers were sent.

=== Electoral history ===
1968 Canadian federal election: Vancouver Centre
Party	Candidate	Votes	%	±%
Liberal	Ron Basford	25,426	56.10	+16.02
New Democratic	William H. Deverell	11,151	24.60	+1.54
Progressive Conservative	David Kilgour	8,326	18.37	–9.43
Republican	Gerard Goeujon	420	0.93	–
Total valid votes		45,323	99.24	
Total rejected ballots		348	0.76	–0.64
Turnout		45,671	70.81	+4.96
Eligible voters		64,498		
Liberal hold		Swing		+7.24
Source: Library of Parliament

As a Conservative, Kilgour was elected in the riding of Edmonton Strathcona in 1979, 1980, and 1984, and in Edmonton Southeast in 1988. After switching to the Liberals, he was elected in 1993, 1997, and 2000, and in Edmonton—Mill Woods—Beaumont in 2004.

== Democracy activism ==
While being a lifelong practicing Christian, Kilgour worked on issues such as inter-faith dialog, personal freedoms, and democratic government throughout his career. In Parliament, he was active in prayer groups while at venues and publications across the country he has spoken specifically on religious themes and politics. Commonly, his topics have been on global religious and political persecutions. He served as a fellow of the Queen's University Centre for the Study of Democracy; a director of the Washington-based Council for a Community of Democracies (CCD), and co-chair of the Canadian Friends of a Democratic Iran, and hosted an Iran pro-democracy rally attended by approximately 90,000 in France in 2009.

His personal religious beliefs landed him in the news in 2003 when he abstained from the same-sex marriage bill and was reprimanded by then Prime Minister Jean Chrétien.

== Organ harvesting of Falun Gong practitioners in China ==
In 2006, allegations emerged that a large number of Falun Gong practitioners had been killed to supply China's organ transplant industry. With David Matas he released the Kilgour-Matas report, which stated "the source of 41,500 transplants for the six-year period 2000 to 2005 is unexplained" and "we believe that there have been and continue today to be large-scale organ seizures from unwilling Falun Gong practitioners". In 2009, they published an updated version of the report as a book. They traveled to about 50 countries to raise awareness of the situation.

In 2012, State Organs: Transplant Abuse in China, edited by David Matas and Dr. Torsten Trey, was published with essays from six medical professionals, Ethan Gutmann, David Matas and an essay co-written by Kilgour. Ethan Gutmann interviewed over 100 witnesses and estimated that 65,000 Falun Gong practitioners were killed for their organs from 2000 to 2008.

== Personal life and death ==
Kilgour was married to Laura Scott, with whom he had five children. He died on April 5, 2022, in Ottawa at the age of 81, from lung disease.

Kilgour's older sister Geills was married to John Turner, briefly prime minister in 1984. The brothers-in-law served jointly in the 33rd and 34th Canadian Parliaments.

== Articles ==
- Organ Pillaging from Falun Gong in China Subcommittee on Human Rights of European Parliament, Brussels, December 1, 2009

== Books ==
- Uneasy patriots: Western Canadians in confederation (1988)
- Inside Outer Canada (1990)
- Betrayal: The spy Canada abandoned (1994)
- Uneasy Neighbours: Canada, The USA and the Dynamics of State, Industry and Culture (2007) with David T. Jones
- Bloody Harvest: The Killing of Falun Gong for Their Organs (2009) with David Matas

== Recognition ==
Throughout his parliamentary career, Kilgour has been awarded a wide range of awards, including: the Kaputiman Award from the Council of Edmonton Filipino Associations; the Special Award from the Ukrainian Canadian Congress (Alberta Provincial Council); an Outstanding Service Award from the Edmonton Sikh community; the Religious Liberty Award from the International Religious Liberty Association in Washington, D.C., Liberty Magazine and the Seventh-day Adventist Church; and as Chairman of the Parliamentary Group for Soviet Jewry, he was recognized by B'nai Brith Canada for his effort and commitment to bringing the plight of the Soviet Jewry to the attention of Canadians.

In May 2006, he received an honorary Doctor of Divinity (D.D.(Hon)) degree from Knox College, University of Toronto. Kilgour, a Presbyterian, was recognized for his commitment to human rights in Canada and abroad and particularly his challenge to the international community to respond to the plight of Darfur, as well as in Burma, and Zimbabwe. For their organ harvesting work, Matas and Kilgour won the 2009 Human Rights Award from the German-based International Society for Human Rights and were nominated for the 2010 Nobel Peace Prize.

== Relations ==
He is the brother of Geills Turner, widow of former Canadian Prime Minister John Turner. Kilgour and his sister are the great nephew and niece of John McCrae, the soldier and poet who wrote In Flanders Fields, and also the great nephew and niece of John Wentworth Russell, who painted the portrait of Sir Wilfrid Laurier, which hangs in the House of Commons.

== Documentaries ==
He appeared in Red Reign: The Bloody Harvest of China's Prisoners (2013), Davids and Goliath (2014), and was interviewed in Free China: The Courage to Believe. He also has a brief appearance in the 2012 documentary film Death by China.

== See also ==
- Organ harvesting from Falun Gong practitioners in China
- Persecution of Falun Gong
- Ethan Gutmann
- David Matas

26th Canadian Ministry (1993–2003) – Cabinet of Jean Chrétien
Sub-Cabinet Posts (2)
Predecessor	Title	Successor
Rey Pagtakhan	Secretary of State (Asia-Pacific) (2002–2003)	
Christine Stewart	Secretary of State (Latin America and Africa) (1997–2002)	Denis Paradis
