= David Matas =

Canadian lawyer

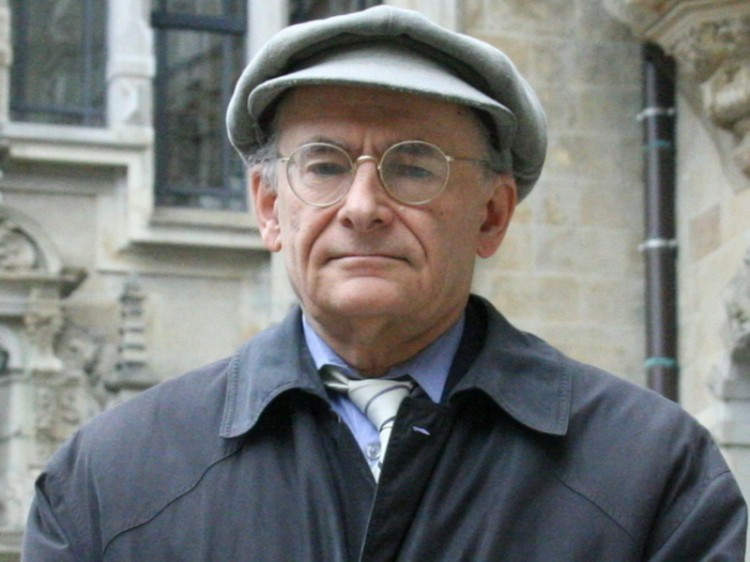
- Born: 29 August 1943 (age 83); Winnipeg, Manitoba, Canada

David Matas CM (born 29 August 1943) is the senior legal counsel of B'nai Brith Canada who currently resides in Winnipeg, Manitoba. He has maintained a private practice in refugee, immigration, and human rights law since 1979, and has published various books and manuscripts.

Criticizing impunity for human rights abuses, Matas stated: "Nothing emboldens a criminal so much as the knowledge he can get away with a crime."

== Early life and education ==
David Matas was born in Winnipeg, Manitoba; his grandparents were immigrants from Ukraine and Romania. He obtained a B.A. from the University of Manitoba in 1964, and a Master of Arts from Princeton University in 1965. In 1967, he obtained a Bachelor of Arts (Jurisprudence) from the University of Oxford, England, and in 1968 he obtained a Bachelor of Civil Law. In 1969, he became a Middle Temple United Kingdom Barrister, and he joined the Bar of Manitoba in 1971.

== Career ==
=== Government work ===
Matas served as a Law Clerk to the Chief Justice of Canada in 1968–69, and was a member of the Foreign Ownership Working Group, Government of Canada, and was special assistant to the Solicitor General of Canada in 1971–72.

He served as a member of the Canadian delegation to the United Nations General Assembly, the Task Force on Immigration Practices & Procedures, the Canadian delegation to the United Nations Conference on an International Criminal Court 1998, the Canadian Delegation to the Stockholm International Forum on the Holocaust, and from 1997 until 2003, the Director of the International Centre for Human Rights & Democratic Development. On 13 November 2009, Matas was appointed to the board of this centre, also known as Rights and Democracy (R&D), which was headed by Professor Aural Braun. Shortly afterwards, a number of illicit actions by the staff of R&D and secret grants to radical organizations were exposed, and Matas joined Braun in initiating a major investigation. As a result of the investigations, funding was cut and in 2012, the government closed the Rights and Democracy framework.

=== Teaching work ===
Matas has also taught constitutional law at McGill University, Introductory Economics, Canadian Economic Problems, International Law, Civil Liberties, and Immigration & Refugee Law, at the University of Manitoba.

=== Politics ===
David Matas ran for the House of Commons of Canada in the 1979 and 1980 federal elections as a Liberal candidate in Winnipeg—Assiniboine district and came in second place both times.

In 2009, Matas was a signatory to a letter opposing the appointment of Christine Chinkin to a UN Human Rights Council fact finding mission on the 2008-2009 Gaza War (also known as the Goldstone Commission), alleging that Chinkin signed a prejudicial letter that indicated that, without examining the evidence, she "concluded that Israel was acting contrary to international law." Chinkin did not resign, and endorsed the UN report, which was later denounced as biased and ill-informed by one of its authors, Judge Goldstone. The report's other authors stand by its content and criticized Goldstone's reversal of position on it.

In his book "Aftershock: Anti-Zionism and Anti-Semitism", Matas accused critics of Israel's post-1967 war policies regarding the West Bank of having double standards in not also criticizing China's occupation of Tibet.

=== Human rights work ===
Nothing emboldens a criminal so much as the knowledge he can get away with a crime. That was the message the failure to prosecute for the Armenian massacre gave to the Nazis. We ignore the lesson of the Holocaust at our peril.

— Matas in 1989

He has been actively involved as Director of the International Defence & Aid Fund for South Africa in Canada, Director of Canada-South Africa Cooperation, Co-chair Canadian Helsinki Watch Group, Director Manitoba Association of Rights & Liberties, Amnesty International, B'nai Brith Canada, the Canadian Bar Association, the International Commission of Jurists, Canadian Jewish Congress, and Canadian Council for Refugees.

He represented Lai Changxing in his extradition proceedings.

He is also counsel for Justice for Jews from Arab Countries and is co-author of "Jewish Refugees from Arab Countries: The Case for Rights and Redress".

He presented various papers on the legal issue of prosecuting war criminals in Bangladesh.

==== Organ harvesting of Falun Gong practitioners in China ====
In 2006, with David Kilgour he released the Kilgour-Matas report, which stated "the source of 41,500 transplants for the six year period 2000 to 2005 is unexplained" and "we believe that there has been and continues today to be large scale organ seizures from unwilling Falun Gong practitioners". In 2009, they published an updated version of the report as a book. They visited about 50 countries to raise awareness of the situation. Later Matas stated, "We estimate in the period between 2000 and 2005, there were 41,500 transplants which have no other explained source".

In 2012, State Organs: Transplant Abuse in China, edited by Matas and Torsten Trey, was published with essays from Gabriel Danovitch, Professor of Medicine, Arthur Caplan, Professor of Bioethics, Jacob Lavee, cardiothoracic surgeon, Ghazali Ahmad, Maria Fiatarone Singh, Torsten Trey, Ethan Gutmann and Matas.

== CBA Committee on the Constitution ==
Matas is a member of the Canadian Bar Association. In 1977, following the election of the separatist Parti Québécois government the previous year, he was asked to sit on the CBA Committee on the Constitution. The committee's mandate was to study and make recommendations on the Constitution of Canada. The members of the committee were drawn from each province of Canada, and included two future provincial premiers, a future Supreme Court of Canada justice, two future provincial chief justices, and a future Canadian Ambassador to the United Nations. The Committee presented its report to the CBA at the next annual meeting, in 1978. The committee made wide-ranging recommendations for constitutional change, including a completely new constitution, abolishing the monarchy, changing the Senate, entrenching language rights and a bill of rights, and changing the balance of powers between the federal government and the provinces.

== Works ==
- Justice Delayed: Nazi War Criminals in Canada (1987) with Susan Charendoff, ISBN 978-0920197424
- Closing the Doors: The Failure of Refugee Protection (1989) with Ilana Simon, ISBN 978-0920197813
- No More: The Battle Against Human Rights Violations (1996), ISBN 978-1550022216
- Bloody Words: Hate and Free Speech (2000), ISBN 978-1553310006
- Aftershock: Anti-Zionism & Antisemitism (2005), ISBN 978-1550025538
- Bloody Harvest, The killing of Falun Gong for their organs (2009) with David Kilgour
- Why Did You Do That?: The Autobiography of a Human Rights Advocate (2015), ISBN 978-1-927079-34-8
- Durban Conference: Civil Society Smashes Up, Bnai Brith Canada, 2002

Matas has also appeared in the documentaries Red Reign: The Bloody Harvest of China's Prisoners (2013) and Human Harvest (2014).

== Awards ==
Matas is the recipient of numerous honours and awards including:

- Governor-General's Confederation Medal in 1992
- Outstanding Achievement Award from the Manitoba Association of Rights & Liberties in 1996
- League for Human Rights of B'nai Brith Canada Midwest Region Human Rights Achievement Award in 1999
- Vancouver Interfaith Brotherhood Person of the Year 2006
- Appointed a member of the Order of Canada on October 23, 2008.
- For their organ harvesting work Matas and Kilgour won the 2009 Human Rights Award from the German-based International Society for Human Rights and were nominated for the 2010 Nobel Peace Prize.

== Professional discipline ==
Matas is a member of the Law Society of Manitoba, the regulatory body for lawyers in that province. On April 11, 2024, he admitted in disciplinary proceedings that he had breached an undertaking he had made to the Law Society, that he would only practise with the assistance of other lawyers. The Law Society disciplinary body noted that his breach of his undertaking did not cause any harm to his clients, but felt it necessary to issue a reprimand. It also directed that he pay costs of $1,500 in relation to the disciplinary proceedings.

== See also ==
- Ethan Gutmann
- David Kilgour
- Edward McMillan-Scott
