= Avraham Shalom Levi =

Israeli actor

- אברהם שלום-לוי
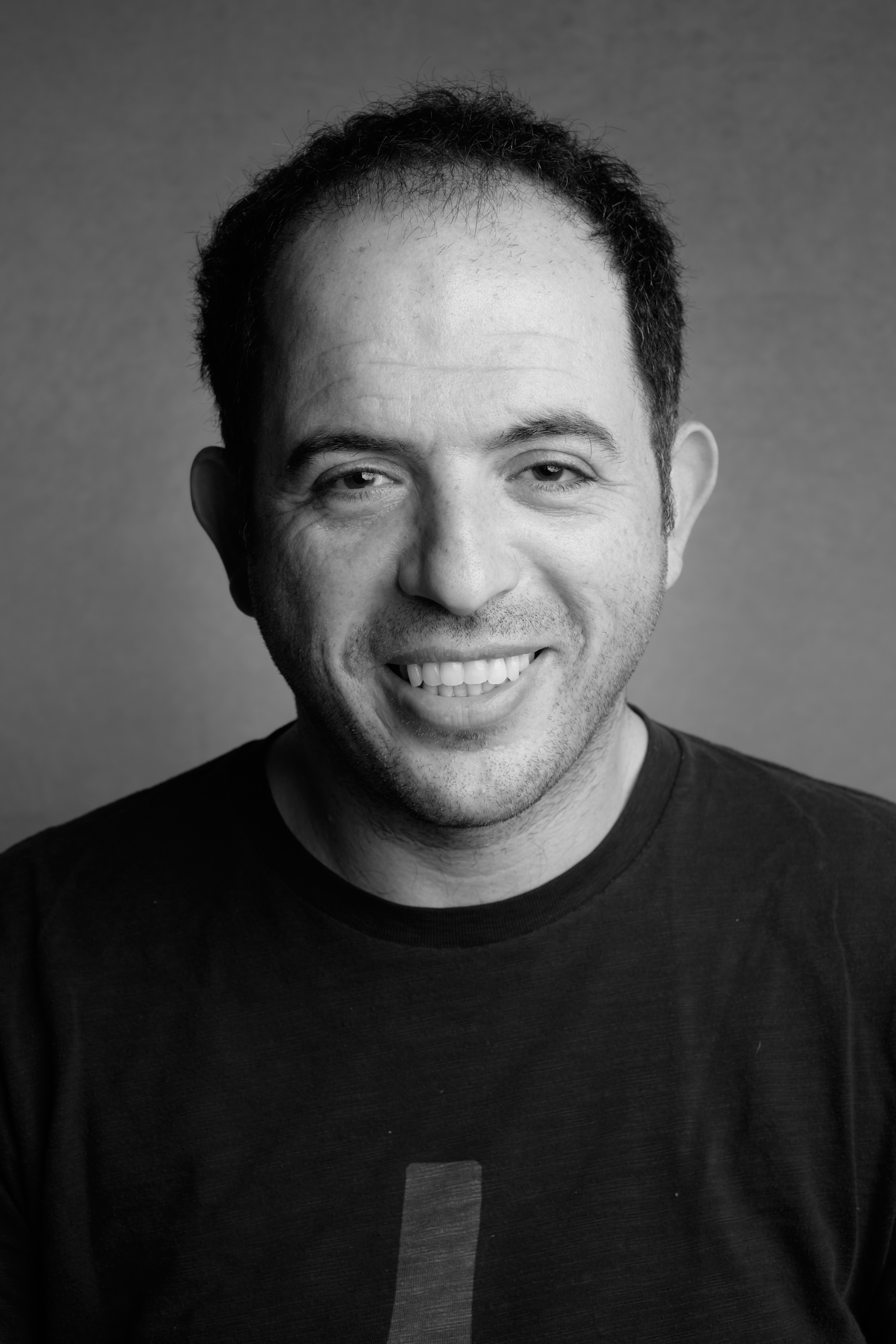
- Born: 1977 (age 48–49); Jerusalem, Israel
- Education: The Lee Strasberg Theatre & Film Institute; Hunter College

Avraham Shalom-Levi (Hebrew: אברהם שלום-לוי; born 1977) is an Israeli actor best known as the showrunner and actor in the TV Drama series Unsilenced, for which he received the Israeli Television Academy Award for: "Best Drama Series", "Best Script" and "Best Supporting Actor in a Drama Series". And for his role in the film Valeria is Getting Married.

== Biography ==
Shalom-Levi was born and raised in Jerusalem as the youngest child of Mazal and Isaac and has two elder sisters. He attended the experimental high school in Jerusalem and chose theater as his major. Between 2000 and 2005 Shalom-Levi lived in New-York, where he studies acting at The Lee Strasberg Theatre & Film Institute. During this period he acted in the play The Zoo Story by Edward Albee, and participated in Anna Strasberg's masterclass. He continued his studies in the Film and Media department at Hunter College, N.Y, and founded a New-York city based ensemble for Israeli Theatre named "Huzpah". The group performed two plays that he has authored: his debut "The Shirt", and "Zvika the Soldier", an anti-militaristic one man show inspired by his experiences as suffering from PTSD following his mandatory military service as a combat soldier.

Upon his return to Israel, a play that he authored and directed, "Coffee with Strawberries" participated in a local theatre festival and immediately after performed at the "Simta [alleyway] Theatre Yafo". He also wrote the script for the short move "Tkasim [Rituals]". In the years that followed Shalom-Levi continued to be a fruitful playwright and creator, as well as playing in many theatre plays, TV shows and films. His recent role as Avinoam in the TV series Unsilenced received the "Best Actor in a Drama Series" Israeli Television Academy award. Shalom-Levi also teaches acting and drama in leading Israeli acting schools, such as "Anat Barzilai Drama and Comedy School", "Sophie Markovich Acting Studio", and "Holon Theater for the Performing Arts" acting studio.

== Career ==
=== Playwright ===
Many of his plays performed in Israel, among them a reproduction of "Zvika the Soldier," that performed in theaters across Israel for more than a decade; "Helmet/Woman," which was performed as part of "Habama" one person shows' festival; and "Fear," which he co-authored with a group of actor-directors in Holon Theater. In addition, he presented his authored plays "Marriage Experiments" in Tzavta Theater, Tel-Aviv, and "Water" and "Ritalin 11," which he authored and directed were presented in Hasimta Theater. His play, "The watchmen", took part in the Haifa "act 2" Theater Festival.

=== Theater director ===
- "Nina's Seagull", "Move" theater, by Nina Chaskinna
- "I want to say about love" by Natti Brooks
- "Where is the money", Aspaklaria theater, Jerusalem
- " Philoctetes return to us", Inbal theatre, Suzanne Dellal Centre for Dance and Theatre.
- "A show in production" in the children theater, "Little Huzzpah"
- "Jazz on the Belgium Front", by Guy Baumhaker, Tzavta Theater
- "Now that the shack has burned we can see the moonlight", a monodrama by Livnat Samra. The Arab-Hebrew Theater.

=== Scriptwriter ===
Shalom-Levi write scripts for various movies. He wrote and directed the feature film "Water - Flood," and wrote scripts for the film "The Bag" and the short film "Rituals."

== Acting career ==
=== Theater ===
Avraham Shalom Levi participated in the play "Buckwoos" at the Beit Lessin Theater. In 2014, he played rabbi Meir Kahane in the one-person show "Kanahe was Right?" written by Yoav Itamar and directed by Elad Sharaby. He also played Golda Meir in the play "Golda – the Last Houseguest," which was written and directed by Yaara Perach-Reich, as part of the "Center Stage" series at the Jerusalem Arts Festival and later at Tzavta Theater. In the summer of 2018, this play was staged at ACUD Theater Berlin. In addition, he played in "Outside of love we have nothing in common", by the author and singer Shay Gabso, at Hasimta Theater.

=== Film ===
Shalom Levi played in many films and TV shows, among them Michal Vinik's film Valeria is Getting Married which screened in the Venice Film Festival and Annemarie Jacir's French-Canadian co-production Salt of This Sea.

=== Television ===
Shalom Levi played in the drama series the Good Policeman, Shtisel and "Magpie", and in the comedies "Irreversible" with Adi Ashkenazi, and "My Successful Sisters", directed by Guri Alfi. He also had guest appearances in the Israeli satirical comedy Eretz Nehederet. He is one of the showrunners of the acclaimed drama series Unsilenced alongside Tamar Marom, Moish Goldberg and Einat Zilber Damari. His role as script writer and actor awarded him the "Best supporting Actor in a Drama Series" award as well as the "Best Drama" and "Best script" awards of the Israeli Television Academy.

== Other works ==
Shalom-Levi was the artistic director at the 'fringe' center of 'Move', a theater NGO, and took part in founding the open school of acting and theater. He initiated and was the artistic director of the Hadera Bikkurim (First-fruits) theatre festival, and in the Holon theatre Fringe Center.

Shalom-Levi taught acting and direction in the Open University, Israel and at the Anat Barzilai Drama and Comedy School, directed plays at the Sofy Moskovich's Tel Aviv Theatre-Studio as well as the Hadera "Bama" (stage) studio, where he directed more than 20 graduation plays.

In addition, between 2018 and 2019 he managed the Hadera municipal youth theatre. Today he teaches public speaking and improving presentation skills at the Ben-Gurion University of the Negev.

== Personal life ==
Shalom-Levi resides in Ramat Gan, Israel. He is married to Rinat Zemah, an artist and art therapist, and a father of two.

== Filmography ==
Year	Title	Role	Notes
2008	Salt of This Sea	Policeman	
2011	Downtown Precinct	Menashe	As Avraham Shalom Levy
2014	Invisibles	Koby	
2015	Shtisel		1 episode
2015	Kapunka	Eliyahu	
2018	My First Dog		
2018	Sabri Maranan		1 episode, As Avraham Shalom Levy
2018	My Successful Sisters		2 episodes, As Avraham Shalom Levy
2019	Magpie		1 episode
2020	Here we are	Lawyer Tzai	
2020	The Policeman's daughter	Rabbi Lifshitz	4 episodes
2021	Shake Your Cares Away	Policeman 1	
2022	concerned citizen	Neighbor with a dog	
2022	Exceptional	Roni	7 episodes
2022	Valeria is Getting Married	Eitan	
2022	Unsilenced	Avinoam	6 episodes

== Awards and nominations ==
Year	Award	Category	Work	Result
2022	Israeli Film Academy	Best Supporting Actor	Valeria is Getting Married	Nominated
2023	Israeli Television Academy	Best Drama Series	Unsilenced	Won
2023	Israeli Television Academy	Best Script	Unsilenced	Won
2023	Israeli Television Academy	Best Supporting Actor in a Drama Series	Unsilenced	Won
