= Unsilenced =

2021 Canadian drama film

- 沉默呼聲
- Directed by: Leon Lee
- Written by: Leon Lee; Jocelyn Tennant; Ty Chan
- Produced by: Leon Lee; Jacey Shi
- Starring: Sam Trammell; Ting Wu; Anastasia Lin; He Tao; James Yi; Tzu-Chiang Wang
- Production company: Flying Cloud Productions
- Distributed by: Zhen Pictures
- Release dates: October 2021 (Heartland International Film Festival); January 21, 2022 (United States)
- Running time: 108 minutes
- Country: Canada
- Languages: Mandarin; English

Unsilenced (simplified Chinese: 沉默呼声; traditional Chinese: 沉默呼聲) is a 2021 Canadian drama film written, produced and directed by Leon Lee. Inspired by the experiences of former Tsinghua University PhD student Wang Weiyu, the film dramatizes the persecution of Falun Gong practitioners in China after the practice was banned by the Chinese government in 1999.

The film stars Sam Trammell, Ting Wu, Anastasia Lin, He Tao, James Yi and Tzu-Chiang Wang. It was produced by Flying Cloud Productions, filmed in Vancouver and Taiwan, and released theatrically in 2022. Unsilenced won the Audience Award for Narrative Feature at the 2021 Austin Film Festival.

== Plot ==
In 1999, Wang, a PhD student at Tsinghua University in Beijing, and his friends live ordinary student lives until the Chinese government bans Falun Gong. As state media campaigns against the practice intensify, the students cross paths with Daniel Davis, an American journalist based in China. Facing arrest, imprisonment and violence, Wang and his friends try to expose the crackdown while Davis weighs whether to report on the story despite the political risks.

== Cast ==
- Sam Trammell as Daniel Davis
- Ting Wu as Wang
- Anastasia Lin as Min Xu
- He Tao as Li
- James Yi as Director Zhu
- Tzu-Chiang Wang as Secretary Yang
- Chen Ying-Yu as Xia
- Shih Cheng-Hao as Jun

== Production ==
Unsilenced was written by Leon Lee, Jocelyn Tennant and Ty Chan, and produced by Flying Cloud Productions. Lee, a Vancouver-based filmmaker, had previously directed Human Harvest, which won a Peabody Award in 2014.

The film was inspired by Wang Weiyu, a former Tsinghua University PhD student who was imprisoned in China for more than eight years for practising Falun Gong before leaving China in 2018. Lee developed the film after speaking with Wang about his experiences.

Because of the film's subject matter, production did not take place in mainland China. The film was shot in Vancouver and Taiwan. Lee said that some crew members used aliases or remained anonymous because of concerns about possible repercussions, and that some cast members and location owners withdrew from the project after learning about the subject matter.

== Release ==
Unsilenced screened at the Heartland International Film Festival in October 2021, where it was listed as a U.S. premiere. It was also included in the 2021 Austin Film Festival lineup.

Distributed by Zhen Pictures, the film opened in limited theatrical release in the United States on January 21, 2022. It was released theatrically across Canada in early 2022. The film later received a theatrical release in Taiwan under the Chinese title 沉默呼聲.

== Reception ==
On Rotten Tomatoes, Unsilenced holds an approval rating of 100% based on seven critic reviews.

Michael Rechtshaffen of the Los Angeles Times wrote that the film, "informed by actual events", emerged as "a moving portrait of conscious resistance in the face of political oppression", while also noting logistical challenges. Chris Knight of the National Post described the film as "a vital examination of China's treatment of its religious and ethnic minorities".

Nick Schager of The Daily Beast wrote that the film's topicality helped it "transcend its storytelling limitations". Scott Marks of the San Diego Reader called the film an "earnest, truth-be-told eye-opener" and a "gripping history lesson".

In an opinion column for The Boston Globe, Jeff Jacoby described the film's theatrical release as a rare example of movie theaters screening a work directly critical of the Chinese government's human rights record.

== Accolades ==
Year	Award or festival	Category	Recipient	Result	Ref.
2021	Austin Film Festival	Audience Award for Narrative Feature	Leon Lee	Won	
2022	Leo Awards	Best Picture Editing in a Motion Picture	Lisa Binkley	Nominated	
