= SaxAndViolin =

Instrumental pop duo

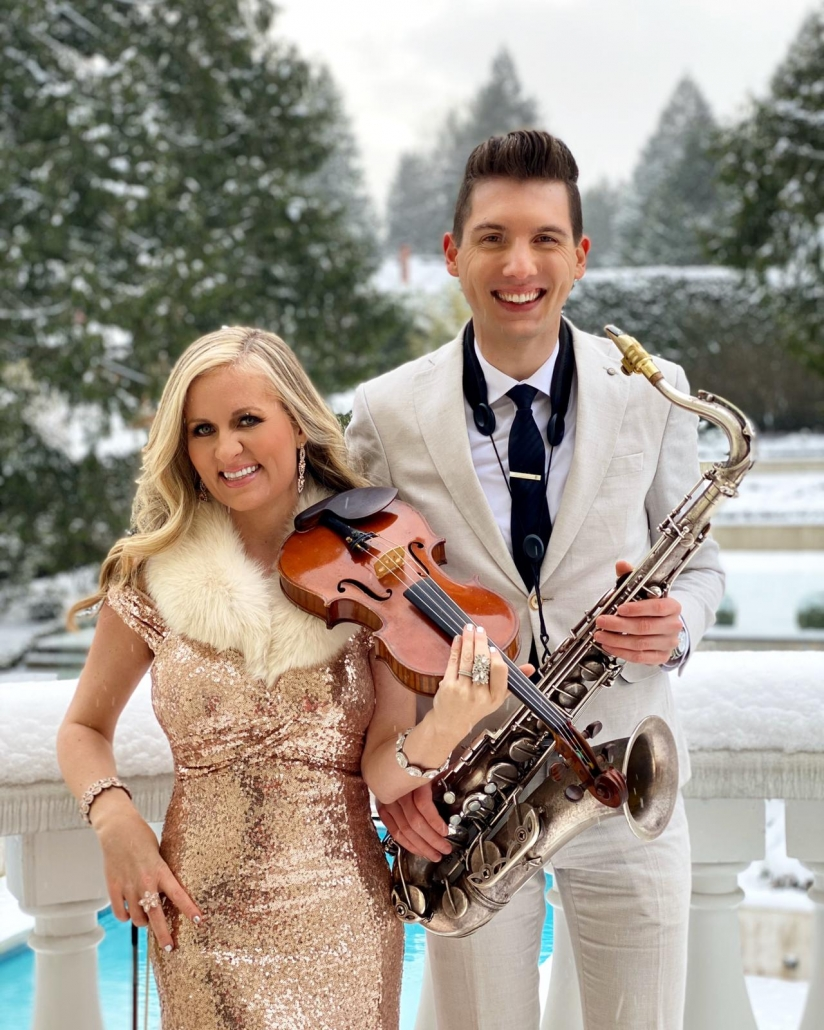
- SaxAndViolin on the set of a music video shoot in 2020

Background information
- Origin: Vancouver, Canada
- Genres: Instrumental pop
- Instruments: tenor saxophone, violin
- Years active: 2016–present
- Label: SaxAndViolin Records
- Members: Eli Bennett; Rosemary Siemens
- Website: saxandviolin.com

SaxAndViolin is a Canadian instrumental pop duo consisting of husband-and-wife Eli Bennett and Rosemary Siemens. The duo has performed private events and concerts around the world including events for Rolls-Royce, Microsoft, Lamborghini, Dell, and a private event at the Vatican. Their debut album Can't Help Falling In Love (Instrumental Love Songs), Vol. 1 released on Valentine's Day, 2020, debuted as the #3 Pop Album in Canada on the Canadian iTunes charts.

== Background ==
In 2012, the duo met in Vancouver, British Columbia, Canada, in the recording studio when Bennett's father Daryl Bennett was producing an album for Siemens. Shortly after, the pair began performing private events together under their own names until they formally branded as SaxAndViolin in March, 2016. After a viral wedding proposal, they married in 2017, in a public wedding ceremony in Siemens' home town of Plum Coulee, Manitoba.

== Career ==
SaxAndViolin was formed in 2016 by saxophonist Eli Bennett and violinist Rosemary Siemens, as a duo for private events and concerts. The unique pairing of instruments featuring a smooth, unprovocative and easy-listening pop sound was an immediate hit with fans and the duo performed around the world, including events for Rolls-Royce, Microsoft, Lamborghini, Dell, as well as a private event at the Vatican.

In February, 2018, the duo began recording and releasing cover songs on their YouTube Channel and Facebook page, beginning with their instrumental version of Enya's hit song "Only Time", filmed in one of the most expensive custom built homes in Port Moody, British Columbia. Shortly after, they were featured in Vancouver Boulevard Magazine highlighting their love story and unique sound.

Later in 2018, the duo performed at the 53rd Canadian National Prayer Breakfast in Ottawa, Ontario, for an audience of Canadian leaders that included Prime Minister Justin Trudeau and Conservative Party Leader Andrew Scheer. They also performed at the Conservative Party of Canada convention in Vancouver, BC, for outgoing Prime Minister Stephen Harper in 2016, and the Conservative Leadership Convention in Toronto, in 2017.

In 2019, they continued releasing music videos on YouTube and Facebook with their versions of Lady Gaga’s song “Shallow” from A Star is Born, and Ed Sheeran’s song “Perfect”, and, as of March 2019, have garnered over six million views on these videos.

On Valentine's Day, 2020, SaxAndViolin released their debut album entitled Can't Help Falling In Love (Instrumental Love Songs), Vol. 1, featuring instrumental love songs that inspired their love story. Released on their own record label, SaxAndViolin Records, the album included classic love songs by Elvis "Can't Help Falling In Love", "Love Me Tender", and current songs "A Thousand Years", by Christina Perri, "Perfect" by Ed Sheeran, and Lady Gaga's "Shallow". Their cover of Lauren Daigle's song "You Say" won Instrumental Song of the Year at the 2020 Covenant Awards.

In February, 2020, the duo released a music video for their version of Dolly Parton's iconic song "I Will Always Love You" filmed during a snowstorm in the backyard of one of Point Grey's biggest mansions in Vancouver, BC.

Bennett and Siemens were both awarded the Queen Elizabeth Diamond Jubilee Medal for their contribution to the arts in Canada.

== Members ==
Eli Bennett was born and raised in Vancouver, BC, Canada, as the firstborn son of Canadian composer, producer, cellist, and drummer Daryl Bennett. Bennett grew up listening to his father's film scores in his studio and was introduced to the saxophone through his father at age 11. In addition to being one of Canada's most recognized saxophonists, Bennett has performed twice at the GRAMMY Awards in Los Angeles, shared the stage with the likes of Oscar Peterson and the Neville Brothers, opened for the legendary pianist Herbie Hancock, and had one of the top jazz albums in Canada with his WCMA nominated “Jazz Album of the Year” debut, Breakthrough. Rosemary Siemens was born and raised in Plum Coulee, Manitoba, Canada, and took up the violin and piano at three-years-old through playing hymns with her mom, Mary Siemens. Siemens has performed four times at New York's Carnegie Hall and was the first violinist to ever perform at the Sistine Chapel at the Vatican since its inception in 1483. Rosemary has performed in over 25 countries, 40 U.S. States, for two U.S. presidents and Canadian prime ministers, and recently won “Country/Gospel Album of the Year“ at Canada's Gospel Music Awards. Her album "Plum Coulee, My Home" won Best Bluegrass/Country Album at the Global Music Awards in 2016.

== Personal life ==
In March, 2017, Siemens was on her "Have a Little Faith" Canadian tour and was performing at Buhler Hall in Gretna, Manitoba, when her boyfriend, saxophonist Eli Bennett, who was also on his own Canadian tour, entered through the back of hall playing Elvis's "Can't Help Falling In Love" on his saxophone. Once on stage, Bennett got down on one knee, pulled a ring out of the bell of his saxophone and proposed to Siemens in front of the entire audience. She said yes, and the couple were wed later that year on August 20, 2017, in a public wedding ceremony in Plum Coulee, Manitoba. The ceremony was attended by 1,500 and live streamed by over 50,000 people via Facebook live. In September 2018, after performing 175 concerts in 100 cities in the nine months of their secret pregnancy, the couple welcomed their first son, Theodore Parker Bennett into the world. They announced the birth through a YouTube music video featuring a song Siemens wrote and Bennett produced entitled "You and Me". In 2020, Siemens won a Covenant Award for Children's Song of the Year for that same song, which is also featured on their debut album Can't Help Falling In Love (Instrumental Love Songs), Vol. 1.

== Awards and nominations ==
- 2020 Covenant Award for Instrumental Song of the Year (You Say, winner)
- 2020 Covenant Award for Children's Song of the Year (Rosemary Siemens feat. SaxAndViolin, You and Me, winner)

== Discography ==
=== Albums ===
- 2020: Can't Help Falling In Love (Instrumental Love Songs), Vol. 1

=== Singles ===
- 2018: You And Me (Rosemary Siemens feat. SaxAndViolin)
- 2019: Only Time
- 2019: Shallow
- 2019: Perfect
- 2019: You Say
- 2019: I'll Never Love Again
- 2019: Chips N Guacamole
- 2019: Old Town Road
- 2019: Señorita
- 2019: Can You Feel The Love Tonight
- 2019: Can't Help Falling In Love
- 2019: A Thousand Years
