= Mary Zilba =

American singer

- Born: September 29, 1963 (age 62); Toledo, Ohio, U.S.
- Citizenship: United States; Canada
- Education: Central Catholic High School
- Alma mater: University of Toledo (BA)
- Occupations: Singer; television personality
- Years active: 1986–2016
- Television: The Real Housewives of Vancouver
- Spouses: John Anthony Hudak (m. 1988; ann. 1989) Frank Anderson (m. 1993; div. 2012)
- Children: 3
- Musical career
- Instrument: Vocals

Mary E. Zilba (born September 29, 1963) is an American-Canadian former singer and television personality best known for her singing career in Canada and her reign as Miss Ohio (Miss America Pageant). Additionally, she received further recognition for her appearance as a cast member on The Real Housewives of Vancouver.

== Early life and beauty pageants ==
Mary Zilba was born in Toledo, Ohio, and is of Lebanese and Syrian ancestry. She attended Central Catholic High School and is a graduate of the University of Toledo where she earned her degree in Journalism / Broadcasting. Zilba and her sister, Juliana, both held Miss Ohio titles.

In 1986, representing Greater Toledo, Zilba was crowned Miss Ohio in the Miss America pageant. For her talent, she sang "Let's Stay Together" by Al Green. She subsequently competed in Miss America 1987, where she sung "My Mammy" by Walter Donaldson.

== Career ==
After her Miss Ohio win in 1986, Zilba's remained in Ohio where she spent her early career working in broadcasting as a reporter and, later, becoming a television host and MC. She later moved to Los Angeles, where she signed a music development deal. During this time, she had a role in the 1994 film L.A. Wars as Carla Giovani.

Musically, Mary Zilba has garnered some Top 40 hits on Canadian Radio. Her songs "Seduction" & "See You Again" reached No. 26 & No. 7 on RPM's Top 30 Adult Contemporary chart (October 1998; August, 1999). In 2012, Zilba started filming for Slice's reality show, The Real Housewives of Vancouver, documenting her return to music after taking a hiatus to raise her children. Zilba remained a prominent cast member until the shows cancellation in 2014.

After her hiatus, Zilba returned to singing in 2013 with her single, "HERO", which went to #1 on the iTunes "Country Music" Charts and #47 over all in the United Kingdom. In 2014, Mary Zilba sang in the sacred Sistine Chapel.

In March 2016, Zilba, with the backing of Rosemary Siemens on piano, Eli Bennett, and Jesse Sukkau on vocals, recorded a single "#VancoUBER" and released it on YouTube as part of a growing desire to see Uber in Vancouver.

== Personal life ==
Born and raised in Ohio, Zilba has six brothers and sisters, and is a mother to three sons; Cole, Chase, and Chad. Cole is a recent graduate of UCLA; Chase attends Santa Monica college and is a working musician. Chad is a model/actor attending school in Los Angeles.

Zilba's son, Cole Anderson, ran as the BC Liberal Party candidate in the Vancouver-Kingsway electoral district during the 2020 British Columbia general election.

=== Humanitarian work ===
Through her son's diagnosis of tuberous sclerosis at age six, Zilba has been a spokesperson for Tuberous Sclerosis Canada, where she is on the national board of directors. She is also on the board of directors for Epilepsy and Seizure Education in British Columbia. Furthermore, she's received recognition from PETA, and done a campaign with NOH8.

== Discography ==
=== Albums ===
Year	Album
1999	Out Of The Blue: Label: Sound Records; Format: CD, Digital Download
2003	Fly: Label: Sextant Records; Format: CD, Digital Download
2009	Flashback Fast Forward: Compilation; Label: Sound Records; Format: CD, Digital Download
2013	A Timeless Christmas (with Roy & Rosemary): Label: A Roy & Rosemary Production; Format: CD, Digital Download

=== Singles ===
List of singles, with selected chart positions and sales, showing year released and album name
Title	Year	Peak chart positions	Album
Title	Year	UK Ind.	Album
"Do Me Right"	1997	-	Out Of The Blue
"Seduction"	1998	-	Out Of The Blue
"See You Again"	1998	-	Non-album single
"Put Your Arms Around Me"	2003	-	Fly
"Give It Up"	2003	-	Fly
"Whatever"	2003	-	Fly
"All Out of Love"	2003	-	Fly
"Unconditional"	2008	-	Non-album singles
"Little Miss Reckless"	2009	-	Non-album singles
"Hero"	2012	47	Non-album singles
"Are You Sorry Now"	2014	-	Non-album singles
