= Can't Help Falling in Love (Instrumental Love Songs), Vol. 1 =

Can't Help Falling In Love (Instrumental Love Songs), Vol. 1

Studio album by SaxAndViolin
- Released: February 14, 2020
- Studio: SaxAndViolin Studios
- Genre: Instrumental pop
- Length: 48:50
- Label: SaxAndViolin Records
- Producer: Eli Bennett, Rosemary Siemens

Singles from Can't Help Falling In Love (Instrumental Love Songs), Vol. 1
- 1. "I Will Always Love You"; 2. "Perfect"; 3. "Can't Help Falling In Love"

Can't Help Falling In Love (Instrumental Love Songs), Vol. 1 is the debut studio album by Canadian husband-and-wife instrumental pop duo SaxAndViolin. The album, featuring Eli Bennett on tenor saxophone and Rosemary Siemens on violin, included songs that inspired the couple's love story and was released worldwide on February 14, 2020, through SaxAndViolin Records. The album debuted as the #3 Pop Album on the Canadian iTunes Charts.

== Recording ==
The album was recorded at SaxAndViolin Studios in Vancouver, BC, Canada, over the course of several months of 2019.

== Track listing ==
No.	Title	Writer(s)	Arranger(s)	Length
1.	"I Will Always Love You"	Dolly Parton	Bennett, Siemens	4:19
2.	"A Thousand Years"	Christina Perri	Bennett, Siemens	4:43
3.	"Can't Help Falling in Love"	Elvis	Bennett, Siemens	3:48
4.	"Can You Feel the Love Tonight"	Elton John	Bennett, Siemens	4:00
5.	"Perfect"	Ed Sheeran	Bennett, Siemens	4:24
6.	"I'll Never Love Again"	Lady Gaga	Bennett, Siemens	4:47
7.	"Shallow"	Lady Gaga	Bennett, Siemens	3:36
8.	"You Say"	Lauren Daigle	Bennett, Siemens	4:28
9.	"Only Time"	Enya	Bennett, Siemens	3:28
10.	"You and Me"	Rosemary Siemens, Jaylene Johnson	Bennett, Siemens	3:07
11.	"You'll Never Walk Alone"	Richard Rodgers	Bennett, Siemens	4:28
12.	"Love Me Tender"	Elvis	Bennett, Siemens	3:42
Total length:				48:50

Digital release
No.	Title	Writer(s)	Arranger(s)	Length
1.	"I Will Always Love You"	Dolly Parton	Bennett, Siemens	4:19
2.	"A Thousand Years"	Christina Perri	Bennett, Siemens	4:43
3.	"Can't Help Falling in Love"	Elvis	Bennett, Siemens	3:48
4.	"Can You Feel the Love Tonight"	Elton John	Bennett, Siemens	4:00
5.	"Perfect"	Ed Sheeran	Bennett, Siemens	4:24
6.	"I'll Never Love Again"	Lady Gaga	Bennett, Siemens	4:47
7.	"Shallow"	Shallow	Bennett, Siemens	3:36
8.	"You Say"	Lauren Daigle	Bennett, Siemens	4:28
9.	"Only Time"	Enya	Bennett, Siemens	3:28
10.	"You'll Never Walk Alone"	Richard Rodgers	Bennett, Siemens	4:28
11.	"Love Me Tender"	Elvis	Bennett, Siemens	3:42

== Personnel ==
- Eli Bennett - tenor saxophone
- Rosemary Siemens - violin, piano (vocals on track 8 only)

== Release history ==
Regions	Dates	Format(s)	Label	Edition(s)
Worldwide	February 14, 2020	CD	SaxAndViolin Records	Standard
Worldwide	February 14, 2020	Digital download	SaxAndViolin Records	Digital Release

== Music videos ==
Title	Year	Director(s)	Notes
"I Will Always Love You"	2020	Joel Grenz (Motiontide), Bora Yenal	Filmed in Vancouver, BC, Canada
"Only Time"	2019	Joel Grenz (Motiontide), Bora Yenal	Filmed in Port Moody, BC, Canada

== Awards and nominations ==
- 2020 Covenant Award for Instrumental Song of the Year (You Say, winner)
- 2020 Covenant Award for Children's Song of the Year (Rosemary Siemens feat. SaxAndViolin, You and Me, winner)
