= Eli Bennett =

Canadian saxophonist and composer

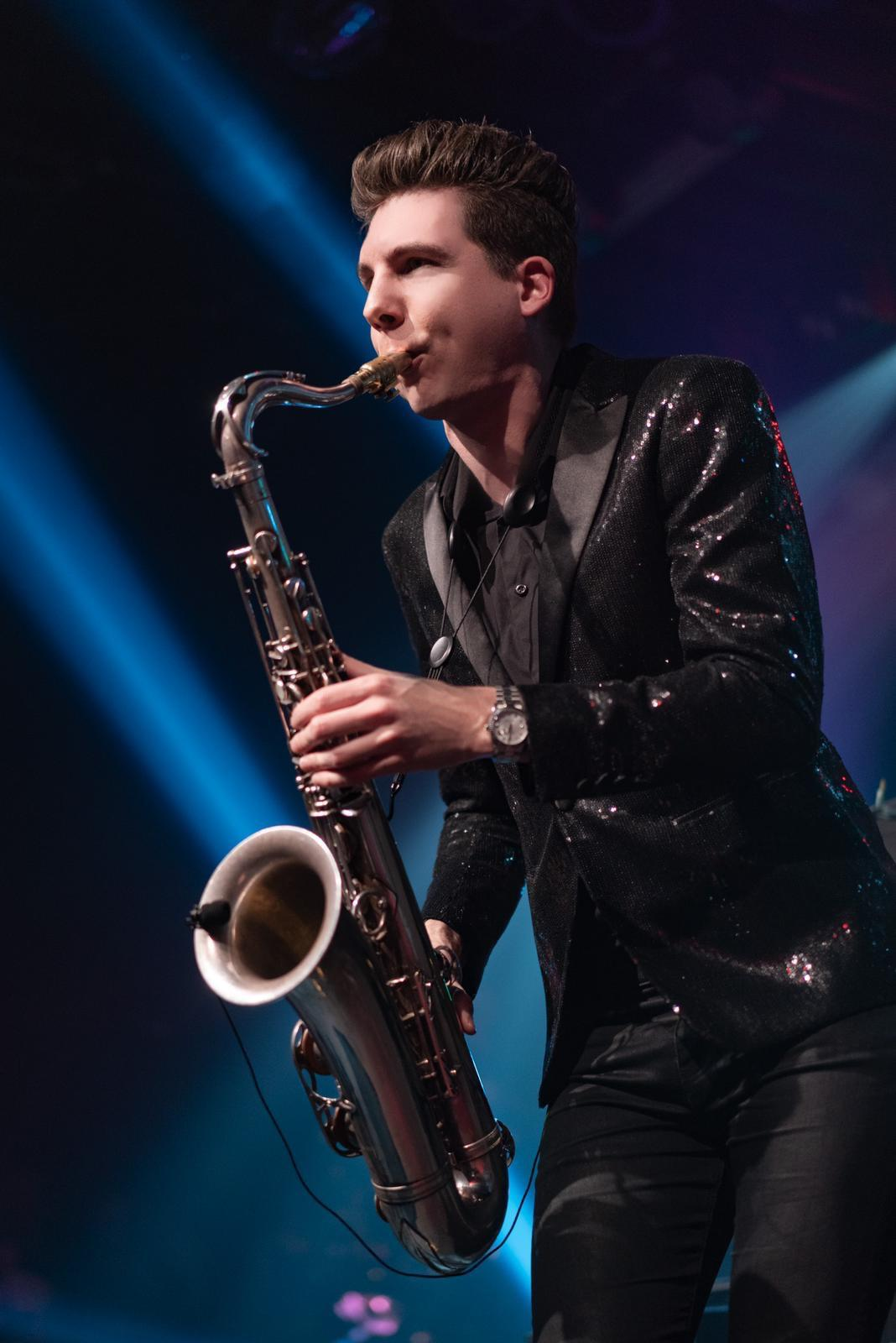
- Eli Bennett performing in Vancouver in 2018

Background information
- Born: Eli Parker Bennett; March 9, 1989 (age 37); Vancouver, British Columbia
- Genres: Jazz, Pop
- Occupations: Musician, composer
- Instrument: Tenor saxophone
- Years active: 2004–present
- Labels: Independent, SaxAndViolin Records, Addo Records
- Website: www.elibennett.com

Eli Bennett (born March 9, 1989) is a Canadian Juno Award-nominated saxophonist and Leo Award-winning film composer. He has composed more than twenty film scores and in 2018 received his first Leo Award for Best Musical Score in a Feature Length Documentary for the film Believe: The True Story of Real Bearded Santas. He was also awarded the Queen Elizabeth Diamond Jubilee Medal from the Premier of BC for his contribution to the arts in Canada. He is married to violinist and vocalist Rosemary Siemens with whom he records and performs with their instrumental duo SaxAndViolin and in 2019 they performed together at The Vatican.

== Biography ==
=== Early life ===
Bennett was born in Vancouver, British Columbia, Canada as the firstborn son of Canadian composer, cellist, and Powder Blues Band drummer Daryl Bennett. Bennett grew up listening to his father's film scores in his studio and was introduced to the alto saxophone through his father at age 11. At age 13, Bennett switched to the tenor saxophone and began accompanying his father on gigs at Vancouver's iconic blues bar The Yale, where he shared the stage every Monday night with local blues musicians.

=== Career ===
In 2006, Bennett was selected as a member of the Gibson/Baldwin Grammy Jazz Band and performed at Grammy Awards events in Los Angeles such as the Grammy Nominee Celebration, Grammy Celebration After Party and the Grammy Salute to Jazz where he performed with Oscar Peterson, Barry Harris and Hank Jones. He was selected again in 2007 as a member of the Gibson/Baldwin Grammy Jazz Combo and shared the stage with Phil Woods and James Moody at the Grammy Salute to Jazz. In 2006, Bennett opened for Herbie Hancock at the Telluride Jazz Festival and for McCoy Tyner at the Ottawa International Jazz Festival where he was awarded the CBC Galaxie Rising Star Award.

In 2007, Bennett was awarded a full scholarship to study music at Humber College in Toronto where he studied with saxophonists Pat LaBarbara, Kirk McDonald and shared the stage with Chris Potter, Terence Blanchard, Mike Stern, Kurt Elling and Dave Grusin. After graduating from Humber College in 2011, Bennett returned to Vancouver to apprentice with his father as a film composer. Alongside his father, he composed additional music for the films Nash, The Exhibition, and co-composed the score for Take Back Your Power, and Human Harvest. His original score for Believe: The True Story of Real Bearded Santas won a 2018 Leo Award for Best Musical Score in a Feature Length Documentary as well as a SOCAN Foundation Award. He also composed and performed music on an episode of the TV show Through the Wormhole With Morgan Freeman.

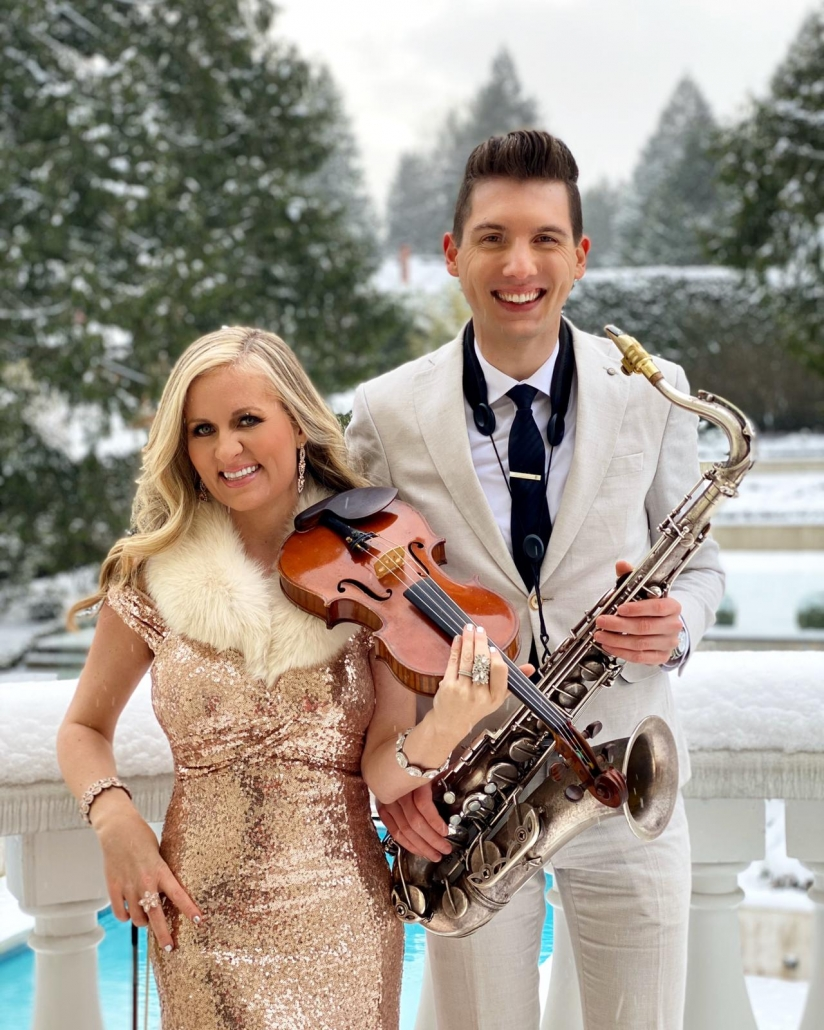
Eli Bennett's duo SaxAndViolin features himself on saxophone alongside his wife Rosemary Siemens on violin

Bennett released his debut album Breakthrough in 2014 on Addo Records (distributed by Universal Music Canada) and re-released independently in 2016. The album was named No. 4 Top debut album by the Ottawa Citizen and received a Western Canadian Music Award nomination for Best Jazz Album. In 2015, Bennett was nominated for the TD Grand Jazz Award by the Montreal International Jazz Festival where he performed with his quartet as part of his Canadian Breakthrough Tour. He also performed at the Vancouver International Jazz Festival, Calgary Jazz Festival, Medicine Hat Jazz Festival, Ottawa Jazz Festival and Toronto Jazz Festival. The album received significant international radio play, including regular play on CBC Radio Canada, Stingray Music, and JAZZ.FM91.

In 2017, Bennett was named 35 best Canadian jazz artists under 35 by CBC Music and described as "...one of the most underrated instrumentalists in jazz today. The greatest aspect of this virtuoso musician is his chameleon-like ability to master funk, soulful music, bebop, modal jazz and all styles in between while keeping his distinctive sound."

In 2018, he earned a Juno Award nomination alongside Five Alarm Funk for his work on the album Sweat.

=== SaxAndViolin ===
Bennett's instrumental duo SaxAndViolin, featuring Bennett on saxophone and his wife Rosemary Siemens on violin, released their debut album on Valentine's Day, 2020, entitled Can't Help Falling in Love (Instrumental Love Songs), Vol. 1 featuring instrumental love songs that inspired their love story. The album charted No. 3 on the Canadian iTunes Pop Chart and their cover of Lauren Daigle's song "You Say" won a 2020 Covenant Award for Instrumental Song of the Year.

=== Leo Awards Musical Director ===
In 2017, the Leo Awards announced that Bennett would replace Hal Beckett as Musical Director for the Leo Awards. Each year, Bennett directs the live band for the Leo Awards show including the show's opening production and in-show music. Bennett is a Leo Award winner and a five-time nominee for his work as a composer.

=== Instruments ===
Bennett has played a Selmer Mark VI tenor saxophone exclusively since 2007 along with D'Addario Woodwinds Royal reeds since 2004.

=== Publications ===
In 2012, Bennett created his own publishing company, Eli Bennett Publishing, and released his first transcription eBook entitled Chris Potter Plays Acapella Solo Standards. The eBook featured eleven solos over jazz standards performed by award-winning jazz saxophonist Chris Potter.

== Personal life ==
On March 18, 2017, while on separate Canadian tours, Bennett proposed to his girlfriend, violinist Rosemary Siemens, by interrupting her concert in Gretna, Manitoba, by entering through the back of Buhler Hall, playing Elvis's "Can't Help Falling in Love" on his saxophone. Once on stage, Bennett got down on one knee and proposed to Siemens in front of the entire audience. She said yes, and the couple were wed later that year on August 20, 2017, in a public wedding ceremony in Plum Coulee, Manitoba. In September 2018, the couple welcomed their first son, Theodore Parker Bennett, into the world after keeping the pregnancy a secret. They announced the birth through a YouTube video featuring a song Siemens wrote and Bennett produced entitled "You and Me".

== Awards and nominations ==
- 2006 CBC Galaxie Rising Star Award from the Ottawa International Jazz Festival
- 2007 Yamaha Kando Award from MusicFest Canada
- 2007 Oscar Peterson Grant for Jazz Performance from The Hnatyshyn Foundation
- 2008 Oscar Peterson Prize from Humber College
- 2009 CBC Galaxie Rising Star Award at the Canadian National Jazz Awards
- 2010 Rising Star Award from the Prince Edward County Jazz Festival
- 2012 Vancouver Mayor's Arts Award for Music as Emerging Artist
- 2012 Leo Award for Best Musical Score in a Documentary Program or Series (Nash, nominee)
- 2013 Queen Elizabeth Diamond Jubilee Medal
- 2013 Leo Award for Best Musical Score in a Short Drama (Reset, nominee)
- 2013 Leo Award for Best Musical Score in a Short Drama (Escape Act, nominee)
- 2014 Leo Award for Best Musical Score in an Animation Program or Series (Remedy, nominee)
- 2015 SOCAN Foundation Award for Best Musical Score Non-Fiction (Believe: The True Story of Real Bearded Santas, Second prize)
- 2015 SOCAN Foundation Award for Best Musical Score Fiction (Jobless, Second prize)
- 2015 Julian Jazz Award for Best Jazz Album from CJSF 90.1 FM
- 2015 TD Grand Jazz Award from the Montreal International Jazz Festival (nominee)
- 2016 Global Music Award for Jazz Album (Silver Medal)
- 2016 Fraser Valley Music Award for Best Jazz Album (Breakthrough, winner)
- 2018 Leo Award for Best Musical Score in a Feature Length Documentary (Believe: The True Story of Real Bearded Santas, winner)
- 2018 Juno Award for Instrumental Album of the Year (Five Alarm Funk, nominee)
- 2020 Covenant Award for Instrumental Song of the Year (SaxAndViolin, You Say, winner)
- 2020 Canadian Digital Influencer Award (Entertainment category, nominee)

== Selected discography ==
=== As leader or co-leader ===
- 2014: Breakthrough
- 2016: Breakthrough (re-release)
- 2020: Can't Help Falling in Love (Instrumental Love Songs), Vol. 1 with SaxAndViolin

=== As a sideman ===
- 2006: Five Alarm Funk – Five Alarm Funk
- 2011: In Transit – Paul Morrison
- 2012: Once Upon a Dream - Roy & Rosemary
- 2015: Footsteps – Gray Matter
- 2016: Eternally Grateful – Warren Dean Flandez
- 2016: Plum Coulee, My Home – Rosemary Siemens & The Sweet Sound Revival
- 2017: Sweat – Five Alarm Funk
- 2018: Violet, Gold + Rose – David Ward
- 2018: Suite for Hard Rubber Orchestra – Hard Rubber Orchestra
