= Cynthia Menard =

Canadian beauty pageant titleholder (born 2000)

- Born: Cynthia Menard; 2000 (age 25–26); Ottawa, Ontario, Canada
- Occupation: Model
- Height: 5 ft 8 in (1.73 m)
- Beauty pageant titleholder
- Title: Miss World Embrun 2017; Miss World Canada 2017
- Hair colour: Blonde
- Eye colour: Blue
- Major competitions: Miss World Canada 2017 (Winner); Miss World 2017 (Unplaced)

Cynthia Menard (born 2000) is a Canadian model and beauty pageant titleholder who won the Miss World Canada 2017 contest and represented Canada at Miss World 2017.

== Pageantry ==
Menard was crowned Miss World Canada 2017. On November 18, 2017, Menard represented Canada at Miss World 2017 in Sanya, China but unplaced.

Awards and achievements
Preceded by Anastasia Lin	Miss World Canada; 2017	Succeeded by Hanna Begovic
