= List of The Real Housewives of Vancouver episodes =

The Real Housewives of Vancouver was a Canadian reality television show that aired on the Slice cable network. It chronicles the lives of Six women — Jody Claman, Ronnie Negus, Mary Zilba, Amanda Hansen, Ioulia Reynolds, and Robin Reichman — in and around Vancouver as they socialize, work on their careers and spend time with their families. During the course of the series, 25 episodes of The Real Housewives of Vancouver aired over two seasons.

== Series overview ==
List of The Real Housewives of Vancouver episodes
Season	Episodes	Originally released	
Season	Episodes	First released	Last released
1	15	April 4, 2012	July 4, 2012
2	10	February 5, 2013	April 9, 2013

== Episodes ==
=== Season 1 (2012) ===
Episodes of The Real Housewives of Vancouver, season 1
No. overall	No. in season	Title	Original release date
1	1	"Let the Games Begin!"	April 4, 2012
Jody arranges a trip to Whistler. Mary deals with her breakup. Jody attacks Mary over choices in men. Reiko buys a new Ferrari.
2	2	"Oh, Bully"	April 4, 2012
Christina fails to keep dates with Reiko, Ronnie, and her friends Kevin and Marika. Christina arrives late for her 30th birthday party. Mary and Christina confront Jody over her comments in Whistler.
3	3	"She Should've Kept Her Clothes On"	April 11, 2012
Jody and Reiko have facials with Jody still looking the same afterwards. Jody renovates her building and cancels her daughter's ticket to London. Christina buys a horse. Ronnie blames Mary for her drinking. Jody confronts Christina over her behavior at her birthday party.
4	4	"Pass The Peace Pipe"	April 18, 2012
Reiko tries to get the wives to make peace as Mary and Ronnie compete for Jody's allegiance during their text war. Meanwhile Christina prepares herself for her next encounter with Jody.
5	5	"Mending Fences & Burning Bridges"	April 25, 2012
Mary and Ronnie finally attempt to mend fences while Christina burns a potential bridge with Ronnie. Reiko hopes to participate in the Luxury Supercar Show, and Christina falls for a new suitor.
6	6	"Hot Cars & Cold Shoulders"	May 2, 2012
In the aftermath of the Keefer hotel conflict, Mary questions who's left on her side. Ronnie starts a new business venture with her son, while Reiko nervously prepares to model at the Supercars fashion show.
7	7	"Back In The Saddle"	May 9, 2012
The Wives take their kids back to school, and Ronnie debates reuniting with Mary by inviting her to her cowboy-themed birthday party. Meanwhile, her plans for launching a wine label encounter a major hiccup. At Ronnie's birthday, Mia's true nature surfaces against Mary.
8	8	"Ay, Caramba!"	May 16, 2012
After being attacked by Jody and Mia at Ronnie's birthday, Mary leaves the drama behind and heads to Mexico with Christina, Kevin, and Marika but leaves somebody important behind. Meanwhile, Jody turns her critical eye towards her own BFF Reiko.
9	9	"Mexican Standoff"	May 23, 2012
Mary models for a Blue Tulum photo shoot in Mexico, and returns home to face extra heat from Ronnie. Christina tries to recruit Mia to Team Mary even as Jody confronts Mary about spreading rumors about her store. The ladies attend a personal shopping experience, held by Christina, where they discover the lengths Jody will go for her livelihood.
10	10	"Sour Grapes"	May 30, 2012
In the wake of Jody serving Mary with legal papers, Ronnie whisks the ladies off to wine country where Christina risks getting back into Jody's bad books, and Reiko's own bottled-up issues with Jody begin to leak out.
11	11	"You Scratch My Back & I'll Stab Yours"	June 6, 2012
It's an event-full week for the Wives as Reiko throws a lavish Bollywood party, and the ladies attend a glitzy high-society party where Mary and Jody compete for Ronnie's loyalty in an all out tug-of-war.
12	12	"The Fur Flies"	June 13, 2012
Jody throws a glitzy party to launch her new fashion label, and Mary's comeback is complete when she sings at her fundraiser, but the event is disrupted when someone who wasn't invited shows up.
13	13	"Karma Is A Bitch"	June 20, 2012
Ronnie hosts a launch for her wine but finally sees what all the other ladies are talking about with Jody's behavior, prompting her to invite the ladies to finally air out their differences in an explosive finale to Season 1.
14	14	"Reunion: Part 1"	June 27, 2012
Jody and Mary's hostilities are escalated and Ronnie and Mary's friendship is called into question like never before. Especially when Ronnie challenges Mary on the accuracy of a past relationship. Jody confronts Christina about her alleged "one night stand" with her daughter Mia and Christina finally clears up the questions surrounding her age. Host: Mike Bickerton — senior director
15	15	"Reunion: Part 2"	July 4, 2012
In the second hour, the drama continues as the ladies revisit the ambush of Jody at the Hawksworth Lunch and Jody tells her side of the story. Ronnie reveals information about her disabled daughter Remi and Jody also gets emotional with an update on her daughter Mia. There is an appearance from fan favourite Kevin Chase and a final show down between Reiko and Jody regarding the credit card charges. Host: Mike Bickerton — senior director

=== Season 2 (2013) ===
Episodes of The Real Housewives of Vancouver, season 2
No. overall	No. in season	Title	Original release date
16	1	"New Faces & Old Wounds"	February 5, 2013
In the second season premiere, the newest wives are introduced. Ronnie hosts a barbecue to celebrate those who aided in Remington's choking incident and drama ensues between the ladies.
17	2	"Drag Queens & Drama Queens"	February 12, 2013
Robin has Mary assist her with her audition for her first live singing gig. Jody throws a Gay Pride Drag Queen party, which is being held at the same venue as the event Mary is attending, reincarnating their eternal battle.
18	3	"Catwalks & Catfights"	February 19, 2013
Amanda and Ioulia's friendship starts out rocky while the two star in a bikini fashion show that creates drama for all the housewives. Robin is distraught after her dreams of singing at Thunderbird Show Park are ruined, with the unexpected help of Mary's producer.
19	4	"Second Chances & Second Thoughts"	February 26, 2013
Amanda gets face lift for her birthday. Robin receives news about her singing audition and confronts Mary about the situation.
20	5	"High Notes & Low Blows"	March 5, 2013
Ioulia invites the housewives over for a drawing party, which includes a male model. Robin achieves a live singing gig at an event.
21	6	"Cold Shoulders & Hot Butts"	March 12, 2013
Amanda, Ronnie, and Jody take a trip to Toronto for Jody's appearance on Top Chef Canada, ironically Mary also gets an invite to Toronto to sing at Global Morning, inviting Robin as a backup singer. Feeling that she'd miss out, Mary invites Ioulia as well. The ladies attend a high-class backyard party, where Ronnie falls back on the feeling that Mary isn't a good friend and Ioulia shows her tough side.
22	7	"Sweet & Soured"	March 19, 2013
While in Toronto, Jody's appearance on Top Chef Canada ends with a garden party. Mary and Ronnie's friendship is laid out on the table, and the two try to find resolution or abandon each other for good. A surprising twist occurs at a dinner, leaving Mary on the verge of giving up.
23	8	"Quiet Retreats & Loud Attacks"	March 26, 2013
It's Ronnie's birthday and the wives head out for a weekend of pamper. The group realizes that just because Mary is absent from the festivities is no guarantee that there won't be any drama. A secret is revealed about Mary that may never be repairable.
24	9	"War & Piece of Cake"	April 2, 2013
Ronnie hosts a glamorous party for Ioulia's birthday but not all of the ladies are invited. Mary's friends Marika and Lisa host her birthday party, where a surprise visit is not what Mary expected. Jody boycotts Mary's party, and a housewive begins to question if she's on the right side.
25	10	"In Costume & Out of Control"	April 9, 2013
In the season 2 finale, Amanda hosts a Wonderland-themed party, where Jody's actions make Ronnie question her friendships with Jody and Mary. Mary announces her new relationship with a billionaire. Ioulia hosts her art gallery show, where all the wives attend and the end-game begins.
