= Letter from Masanjia =

- Directed by: Leon Lee
- Written by: Caylan Ford; Leon Lee
- Produced by: Leon Lee
- Starring: Sun Yi; Julie Keith
- Cinematography: Marcus Fung
- Edited by: Patrick Carroll
- Music by: Michael Richard Plowman
- Production company: Flying Cloud Productions
- Release date: April 27, 2018 (Hot Docs)
- Running time: 75 minutes
- Country: Canada
- Language: English

Letter from Masanjia is a Canadian documentary film, directed by Leon Lee and released in 2018. The film profiles the case of Sun Yi, a Chinese Falun Gong practitioner turned political prisoner who was responsible for exposing significant human rights abuses at the Masanjia Labor Camp when his letter was found by Oregon resident Julie Keith in a box of Halloween decorations, and made headlines worldwide. The discovery of this letter and the subsequent wide coverage by news agencies in part led to China announcing major reforms, and the abolishment of the labor camp system.

== Reception ==
The film premiered on April 27, 2018, at the Hot Docs Canadian International Documentary Festival.

The film met with high praise. On Rotten Tomatoes it has an approval rating of 100% based on reviews from nine critics.

=== Favorable response ===
Ken Jaworowski of the New York Times wrote: "It’s an important story, made more intense by its tight focus. Mr. Lee uses few additional interviews outside of Ms. Keith and two former guards from the Masanjia labor camp, who corroborate Mr. Sun’s reports. There are no reams of statistics, nor appeals to boycott Chinese-made goods. Instead we’re given a well-told account of one peaceful man’s terrible treatment. That’s more than enough. Animated sequences depicting Mr. Sun’s imprisonment are especially effective."

Kevin Crust of the Los Angeles Times wrote: "In interviews, Sun details an excruciating 2 1/2 years he says he spent at Masanjia, the aftermath and the emotional and physical tolls it took on him and his wife of 20 years, Fu Ning. A heartbreaking nightmare for the couple, a life-changing event for Keith, yet together their stories make Lee’s amazing film deserving of a broad audience. “Letter From Masanjia” is a bracing reminder of our sometimes blindered approach to globalization and the effects of simple actions."

Andrea Gronvall of the Chicago Reader described the film as "an example of documentary at its most aspirational—here, human rights watchdogging."

== Awards ==
The film received a Canadian Screen Award nomination for Best Feature Length Documentary at the 7th Canadian Screen Awards in 2019.
