= Leon Lee (filmmaker) =

Canadian film director and producer

- Occupations: Film director; producer; screenwriter
- Years active: 2006-present
- Organization: Flying Cloud Productions
- Known for: Human Harvest (2014); Letter from Masanjia (2018); Unsilenced (2021)
- Awards: Peabody Award; Leo Awards

Leon Lee is a Canadian film director, producer and screenwriter based in Vancouver, British Columbia. He is known for documentaries and narrative films dealing with human-rights issues in China, including the Peabody Award-winning documentary Human Harvest (2014), Letter from Masanjia (2018), and the narrative feature Unsilenced (2021). His work has received a Peabody Award, Canadian Screen Award nominations and multiple Leo Awards.

== Early life and career ==
Lee is originally from China and is based in Vancouver. He has said that he began filmmaking after reading a 2006 newspaper report about allegations of forced organ harvesting from prisoners of conscience in China, a subject he initially found difficult to believe but began to investigate. His first major documentary, Human Harvest, took eight years to complete. Lee is associated with the Vancouver production company Flying Cloud Productions, which has produced his documentary, narrative and animated films. His films have often addressed subjects considered politically sensitive in China.

In interviews, Lee has said that his previous work prevented him from safely returning to mainland China to film, which shaped the production methods used in later projects, including remote collaboration and overseas production.

== Films ==
=== Human Harvest ===
Lee wrote, directed and produced Human Harvest: China's Illegal Organ Trade, a documentary following Canadian investigators David Matas and David Kilgour as they examined allegations that hospitals in China harvested and sold organs from prisoners of conscience, mainly Falun Gong practitioners.

Human Harvest received the 2014 Peabody Award for documentary. It also won the Association for International Broadcasting's international investigative documentary award and the Michael Sullivan Frontline Award for journalism in a documentary film. The film was nominated for the Donald Brittain Award for Best Social/Political Documentary Program at the 2016 Canadian Screen Awards.

=== The Bleeding Edge ===
Lee wrote, directed and produced the narrative feature The Bleeding Edge. The film stars Anastasia Lin, who was Miss World Canada in 2015. The film screened at the Vancouver Asian Film Festival. It received a Gabriel Award in the Drama film category, and Lin won a Leo Award for Best Lead Performance by a Female in a Television Movie for her role.

=== Avenues of Escape ===
Lee wrote, directed and produced the documentary Avenues of Escape, which was broadcast by documentary Channel and received a Canadian Screen Award nomination for Best Original Music, Non-Fiction. At the 2017 Leo Awards, Avenues of Escape won four awards in the Feature Length Documentary category, including Best Program, Best Direction and Best Screenwriting.

=== Letter from Masanjia ===
Letter from Masanjia is a documentary about Sun Yi, a Chinese engineer and Falun Gong practitioner imprisoned in the Masanjia labour camp, who hid SOS letters in Halloween decorations exported to the United States. One of the letters was found by Oregon resident Julie Keith. Because Lee could not film in mainland China, he worked with Sun Yi remotely, trained him over Skype, and received encrypted footage through intermediaries. The film had its world premiere at the Hot Docs Canadian International Documentary Festival in 2018. It won the Audience Award for Documentary Feature at the Asian American International Film Festival. In Japan, it was broadcast on NHK BS1's BS World Documentary strand and later received a theatrical release through Group Gendai beginning March 21, 2020.

Letter from Masanjia received a Canadian Screen Award nomination for the Ted Rogers Best Feature Length Documentary Award. At the 2019 Leo Awards, it received six nominations and won two awards, including Best Screenwriting in a Feature Length Documentary for Lee and Caylan Ford. The film was reviewed by several major publications, including The New York Times, the Los Angeles Times and The Globe and Mail.

=== Rag Doll ===
Lee wrote, directed and produced the animated short film Rag Doll. At the 2021 Leo Awards, Rag Doll won four awards in the Animation Program category: Best Animation Program, Best Direction, Best Screenwriting and Best Art Direction.

=== Unsilenced ===
Unsilenced is a narrative feature based on events surrounding the 1999 crackdown on Falun Gong in China. It follows students at Beijing's Tsinghua University and an American journalist as they respond to the campaign of suppression. The film stars Sam Trammell and Anastasia Lin and was written by Lee with Jocelyn Tennant and Ty Chan.

Because of the subject's sensitivity, the production filmed outside mainland China, including in Taiwan and Vancouver. Lee told CBC News that some cast, crew and location owners withdrew from the production over concerns that involvement could jeopardize future work in China. In its review, the Los Angeles Times noted the film's use of anonymous credits and its filming in Taipei and Vancouver. Unsilenced won the Audience Award for Narrative Feature at the 2021 Austin Film Festival.

== Awards and recognition ==
Awards and nominations
Year	Work	Award	Category	Result
2014	Human Harvest	Peabody Award	Documentary	Won
2015	Human Harvest	Association for International Broadcasting Awards	International investigative documentary	Won
2015	Human Harvest	Michael Sullivan Frontline Award	Journalism in a documentary	Won
2016	Human Harvest	Canadian Screen Awards	Donald Brittain Award for Best Social/Political Documentary Program	Nominated
2016	Leon Lee	RBC Top 25 Canadian Immigrants	Honouree	Won
2016	The Bleeding Edge	Gabriel Awards	Drama	Won
2017	Avenues of Escape	Leo Awards	Feature Length Documentary – Best Program	Won
2017	Avenues of Escape	Leo Awards	Feature Length Documentary – Best Direction	Won
2017	Avenues of Escape	Leo Awards	Feature Length Documentary – Best Screenwriting	Won
2017	Avenues of Escape	Leo Awards	Feature Length Documentary – Best Musical Score	Won
2018	Avenues of Escape	Canadian Screen Awards	Best Original Music, Non-Fiction	Nominated
2019	Letter from Masanjia	Canadian Screen Awards	Ted Rogers Best Feature Length Documentary	Nominated
2019	Letter from Masanjia	Leo Awards	Feature Length Documentary – Best Screenwriting	Won
2021	Rag Doll	Leo Awards	Animation Program – Best Animation Program	Won
2021	Rag Doll	Leo Awards	Animation Program – Best Direction	Won
2021	Rag Doll	Leo Awards	Animation Program – Best Screenwriting	Won
2021	Rag Doll	Leo Awards	Animation Program – Best Art Direction	Won
2021	Unsilenced	Austin Film Festival	Audience Award, Narrative Feature	Won

== Filmography ==
Filmography
Year	Title	Director	Writer	Producer	Notes
2014	Human Harvest	Yes	Yes	Yes	Documentary; Peabody Award winner
2016	The Bleeding Edge	Yes	Yes	Yes	Narrative feature
2017	Avenues of Escape	Yes	Yes	Yes	Documentary; Leo Award winner
2017	Ravage	Yes	Yes	Yes	Short narrative film
2018	Letter from Masanjia	Yes	Yes	Yes	Documentary; Canadian Screen Award nominee
2018	Reunion	Yes	Yes	Yes	Short narrative film
2020	Rag Doll	Yes	Yes	Yes	Animated short; Leo Award winner
2021	Unsilenced	Yes	Yes	Yes	Narrative feature; Austin Film Festival Audience Award winner
2024	Mind Wave	Yes	Yes	Yes	Narrative feature
