= Anastasia Lin =

Chinese-Canadian actress and human rights advocate

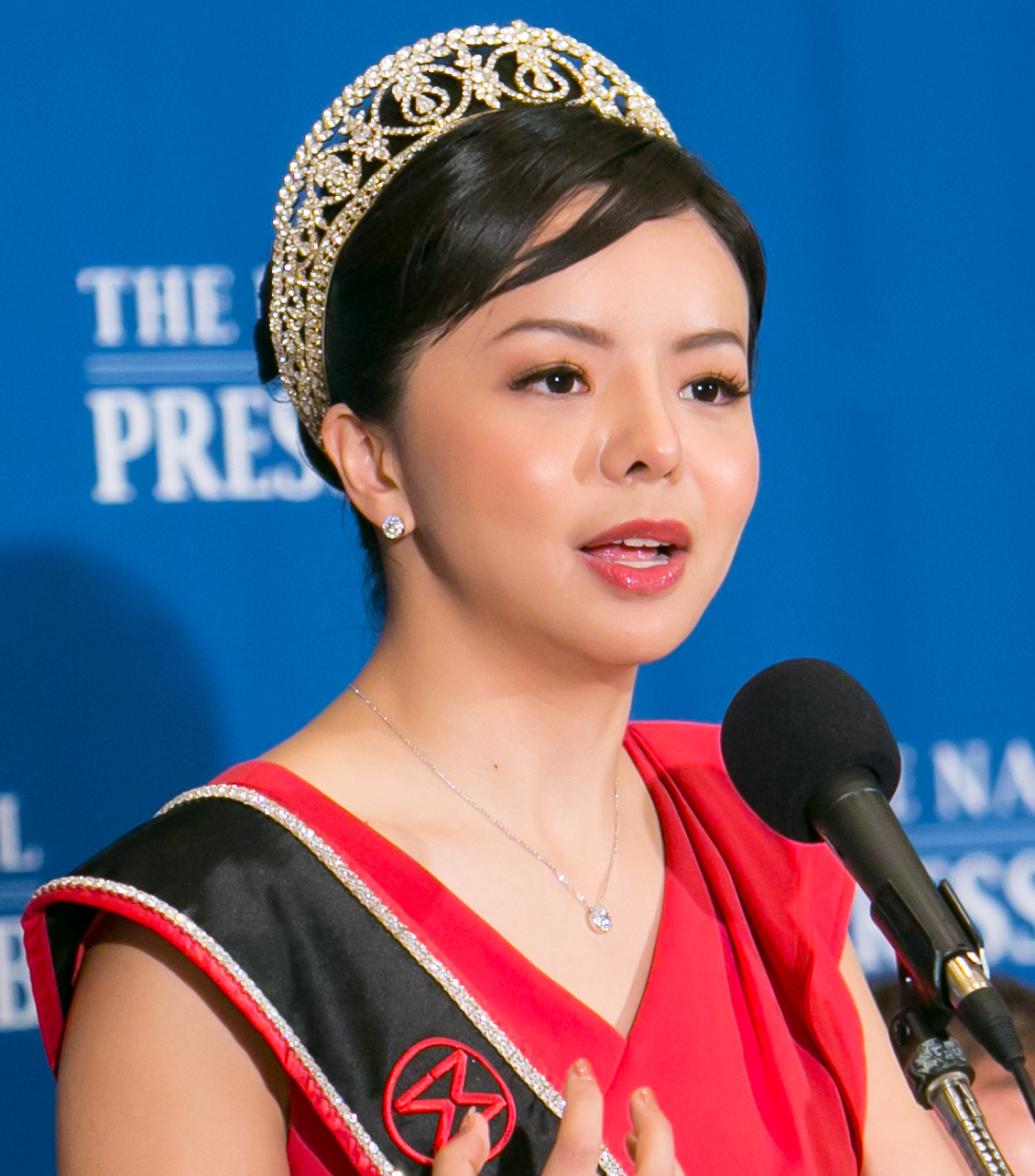
- Lin speaks at the National Press Club
- Born: January 1, 1990 (age 36); Anxiang, Changde, Hunan, China
- Education: University of Toronto
- Occupations: Actress, model, human rights activist
- Awards: Miss World Canada 2015, Leo Award for Best Actress 2016
- Website: anastasialin.com

Lin Yefan
- Chinese: 林耶凡
Transcriptions
Standard Mandarin
- Hanyu Pinyin: Lín Yēfán

Anastasia Lin (born January 1, 1990) is a Chinese-Canadian actress, model, beauty pageant titleholder and human rights advocate.

Lin won the Miss World Canada title in 2015 and was to represent Canada at Miss World 2015 pageant to be held in China but was refused a visa by Chinese authorities after being declared persona non grata. The news of her rejection from the pageant, and her subsequent attempt to enter China through Hong Kong, caused global media attention for several weeks, leading to the front page of The New York Times and op-eds and editorials in major newspapers. Most of the coverage praised what it said was Lin's bravery for "resistance to tyranny" using the novel form of a beauty pageant, and she was hailed as "an outspoken advocate for freedom of conscience." Lin represented Canada at Miss World 2016 in Washington, District of Columbia.

Analysts widely suspected the reason for refusal of entry to be due to her advocacy of human rights in China and choice of film roles, and her rejection from the pageant caused widespread reflection on the ability of China to exert its influence far beyond its own borders.

In January 2016, she was listed as one of the "Top 25 Under 25" by MTV Fora.

== Early life and education ==
Lin's father is the CEO of a large company that supplies medical equipment, Samsung cellphones, and other products in China; he owned a chain of 50 hotpot restaurants, before selling them during the SARS crisis.

In China, Lin's mother was a university professor who taught Western economics and international finance, and was the reason that Lin eventually left the country. "My mother thought a western education would be better for me ... I'm more of an outgoing, opinionated person," Lin said in an interview with Macleans.

She characterizes her mother as a "tiger mom" who put her through elementary school two years early and forced her to learn classical piano as a child. "Every day at 6 a.m she hiked up a mountain, at the peak of which her mother would have her shout English vocabulary words to improve her enunciation." It was from the same mountaintop that Lin and her mother would be able to catch the signal of Voice of America, which is typically banned in China.

Lin went to high school in Vancouver before moving to Toronto. After learning about the Tiananmen Massacre and the persecution of Falun Gong, she began talking to dissidents herself. "It really shocked me. I wanted to do something for them. I heard their stories and I wanted to portray the hopelessness they have that nobody is listening."

== Career as actress ==
Since she began acting at age 15, Lin has appeared in films and television productions, and most prominently played lead roles in several films about human rights themes in China.

In 2008, she portrayed a student killed in a poorly built school that collapsed during the Sichuan earthquake. In 2011 she was lead actress in Beyond Destiny, which won the Golden Palm Award at the Mexico International Film Festival and the Award of Merit at the Indie Fest in California. In 2014-17 she was lead actress in the satirical TV series Big Shorts. The same year she starred in the Swedish film Red Lotus.

The Bleeding Edge (2016), from the creators of the Peabody Award-winning film Human Harvest, is a thriller based on real-life events where she plays a victim of human-rights abuses in China. The film was released on April 11, 2016. She won the 2016 Leo Award for Best Female Lead Performance in a TV Movie. In 2022, she starred in Unsilenced, a Canadian drama about the Chinese government's repression of the Falun Gong movement.

When asked why she acts in productions about human-rights issues, she said: "There aren't a lot of Chinese actresses who really dare to participate in these kinds of projects. They all know the risk of not getting a visa to go back to China, or having family members harassed. I just felt these stories must be heard."

== Pageantry ==
Lin has participated in beauty pageants, winning the Miss World Canada in 2015. In 2013 in the same competition she received second runner up. When Lin competed for the first Miss World Canada title in 2013, she dedicated her piano composition to "those who lost their life for their faith and the millions of people still fighting for their faith today." Her 2015 bid included a video wishing to extend "light and courage to those who still find themselves in the dark."

=== Rejection from Miss World 2015 ===
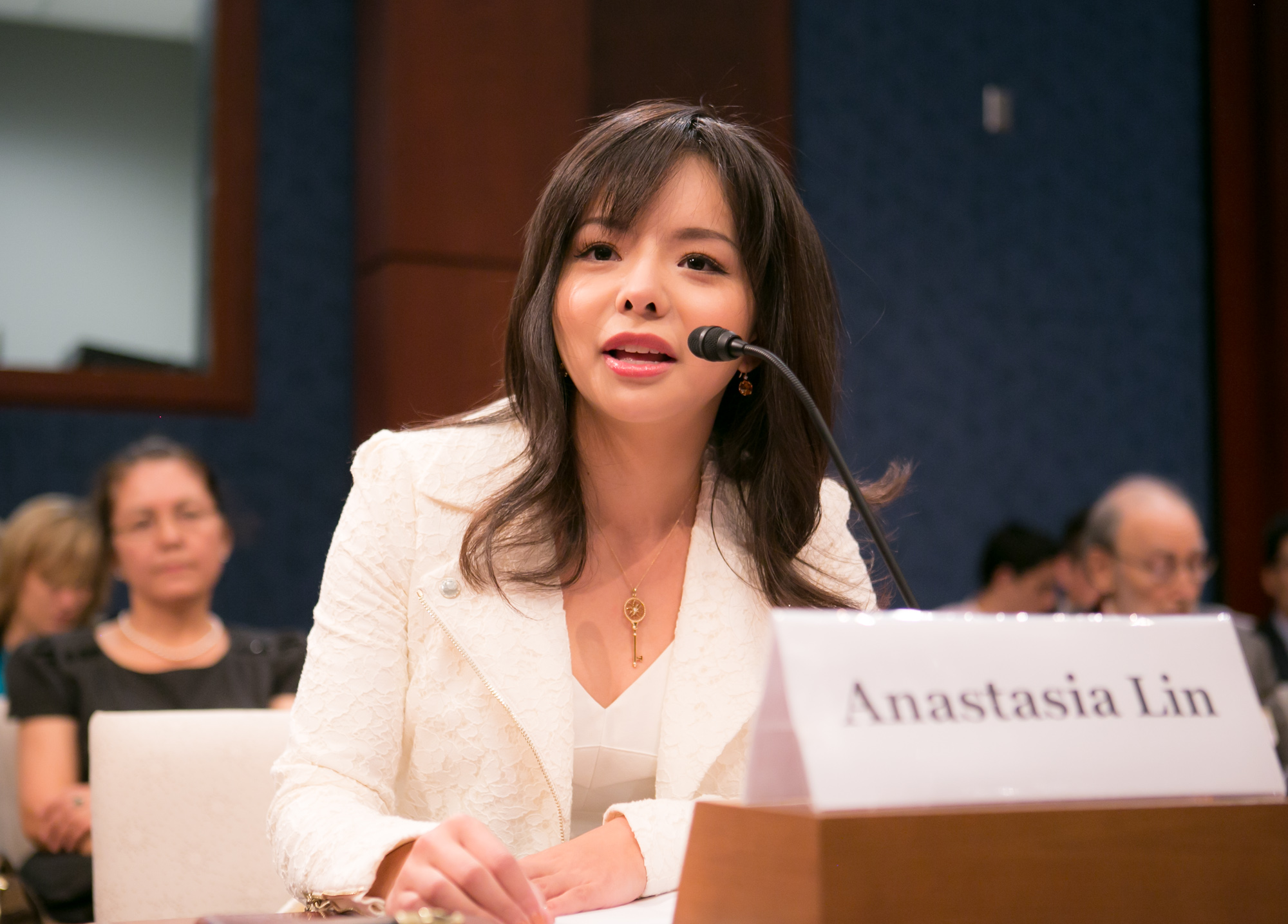
Lin testifying before the United States Congress

In late November, after having not received the invitation letter from the Chinese government to support her visa request for the Miss World 2015, Lin assumed that she had been effectively denied the right to compete in the pageant. She and others presumed the reason to be because of her outspokenness on human rights abuses in China.

That she had been banned was confirmed, however, after she was labeled persona non grata by Chinese embassy staff in Ottawa while she was en route to Hong Kong. Lin had originally hoped to benefit from Hainan province's special visa policy for Canadian nationals, and sought to transit in to Sanya from Hong Kong on a Cathay Pacific flight from Canada. On November 26, 2015, staff at the Hong Kong airport told Lin that she would not be granted a landing visa in Sanya, confirming that she had been denied entry to China. Chinese immigration officials gave no reason for their refusal. In an email to the Globe and Mail referring to the status of Lin, the Chinese embassy in Canada declared that "China does not allow any persona non grata to come to China".

==== Response ====
Lin's being rejected from the pageant led to global media attention and commentary. The Washington Post editorialized that "we ... think the regime feels genuinely threatened by anyone who doesn't toe its line. General Secretary Xi Jinping and his Politburo say they want market-oriented reform, but simultaneously they are tightening the screws on civil society, Internet debate, the media, independent churches or anything else that might challenge the Communist Party." It added that this approach, in the long run, "can only hurt China itself, as the regime becomes more and more brittle, isolated and afraid."

Minxin Pei said that the way that the PRC government was treating Anastasia Lin was an example of its realism as "they know that people will hold their noses and continue to kowtow to them because they have a big checkbook" and "part of a larger strategy for deterring would-be critics: the proverbial slaughter of the chicken that is killed to frighten all those monkeys."

The Wall Street Journal's David Feith called the affair "a window into Beijing's repression and paranoia." He called the Chinese government's response to Lin "official thuggery," and added that this, as well as "Ms. Lin's bravery and pain, are now the legacies of an otherwise forgettable pageant meant to convey cosmopolitan glamour."

Jeff Jacoby, writing in The Boston Globe, declared: "Totalitarian regimes scruple at nothing – not the political manipulation of international beauty contests, not the criminalizing of quiet meditation, not even the blackmail of a father to break his daughter's spirit. The courage to resist such regimes isn't easy to come by. Canada's beauty queen has it in such gallant measure that China fears to let her speak from a Chinese stage. Some other young woman may be crowned Miss World, but it is Anastasia Lin who has been ennobled."

== Human rights advocacy ==
Lin's activism began in part as a reaction to what she characterized as "a lifetime of indoctrination" by China's political authorities. In China Lin was part of the Young Pioneers, a Communist Party organization. She was on the student council and helped to spread anti-Falun Gong propaganda. "As a schoolgirl, I was brainwashed by the state. The first song we sang in kindergarten was about the 'glorious' Communist party. I was a proud little Commie. I'd coach my classmates to turn in traitors."

In an interview with The New York Times, she said: "One of the first songs we learn in kindergarten is 'The Communist Party is closer to me than my mother.'" When she got to Canada, her mother encouraged her to explore alternate view points. "My mother showed me a lot of things that aren't shown in China, like the Tiananmen massacre, Falun Gong persecution, and the Tibetan issue," Lin said. "I felt so deceived. I felt like my life was in a smear campaign for 13 years."

Due to her activism, Chinese state security agents visited and threatened her father in China, attempting to have him sever all contact with her. "Shortly after my victory, my father started receiving threats from Chinese security agents complaining about my human rights advocacy", Lin wrote in an op-ed in The Washington Post, "No doubt fearing for his livelihood and business, my father asked me to stop advocating for human rights. He told me that if I did not stop, we would have to go our separate ways".

In July 2015 Lin was invited to testify before U.S. Congress, addressing the topic of Religion With "Chinese Characteristics": Persecution and Control in Xi Jinping's China. Speaking before the Congressional-Executive Commission on China, Lin said that the intimidation and threats her father received are common. "Good people like my father, a law-abiding and contributing citizen, an honest businessman now too afraid to talk to his daughter, who once supported her in everything she did ... now must leave her to face the world alone ... Mr. Chairman, I hope you understand this is a common experience for so many American and Canadian citizens. Those Chinese who dare to speak their minds do so knowing that those still within the regime's reach in China could pay the price for it."

In subsequent interviews with media, Lin has advocated for freedom of expression in China. She was a speaker at the 2016 Geneva Summit for Human Rights and Democracy.

== As a public figure ==
Soon after she was barred from China, "media outlets the world over have sought out Lin to discuss her viewpoints on China's abuse of its citizens' freedoms and rights," wrote Quartz.

The New York Times wrote that the controversy gave her immediate cachet. "Ms. Lin, it turns out, has become a public-relations nightmare for Beijing ... She is also charismatic, canny and media-savvy. Her David-and-Goliath clash with the Chinese government has drawn sympathetic media attention and legions of supporters around the world, providing her an even bigger platform to speak out about the imprisonment and torture Falun Gong adherents face in China."

The Times of London observed that "Anastasia Lin is the beauty queen whose story links torture, tit tape and tiaras in a sequence of events so entertaining it is screaming out to be adapted for the big screen."

Al Jazeera called Lin "Miss International Incident": "Academics, journalists, even Hollywood celebrities who speak out against human rights abuses in China are banned. So Lin is in good company, along with Richard Gere, Christian Bale, Brad Pitt, Bon Jovi and other stars."

Newsweek reported: "The irony is that in attempting to quietly bar her from the contest, China has effectively made Lin's name a household one, thanks to the Internet. Her voice is now more resonant than ever, and she's gained thousands of supporters worldwide."

Lin has been invited to speak at a luncheon held at the National Press Club.

Apart from her acting and human rights advocacy, Lin went on to become a celebrity in her own right. In January 2016, she was listed as one of the top "25 under 25" by MTV Fora, a list that included Malala, Selena Gomez, and Kylie Jenner. Flare magazine featured her as a "Top 60 under 30," in the activist category, and Marie Claire declared her "The Badass Beauty Queen" in an interview about her work, after her appearance at an Oxford University debate. "Throughout my journey I have encountered a lot of people who look at me like 'what can she possibly offer to this debate?'" Lin said in the Marie Claire interview. "But real power comes when you break through that stereotype and surprise people who have underestimated you. I do all my own research and meet with victims of whatever I am speaking about."

Lin participated in the Oslo Freedom Forum in May 2016, giving a speech about Falun Gong, organ harvesting, and freedom of belief. Jay Nordlinger of National Review wrote that she was "an extraordinary person" and produced a podcast interview with her.

In December 2018, Lin signed on to be a Macdonald-Laurier Institute Ambassador for Canada-China Policy.

== Personal life ==
Lin is married to James Taranto.

Awards and achievements
Preceded by Annora Bourgeault	Miss World Canada; 2015–2016	Succeeded by Cynthia Menard
