= The Real Housewives of Vancouver =

Canadian reality television series

- Genre: Reality
- Based on: The Real Housewives
- Directed by: Mike Bickerton; Fred Frame; Tara Shortt
- Presented by: Mike Bickerton (s. 1)
- Starring: Jody Claman; Christina Kiesel; Reiko MacKenzie; Ronnie Negus; Mary Zilba; Amanda Hansen; Robin Reichman; Ioulia Reynolds
- Country of origin: Canada
- Original language: English
- No. of seasons: 2
- No. of episodes: 25 (list of episodes)

Production
- Executive producers: Louise Clark; Erin Haskett; Grant Greschuk
- Production locations: Vancouver, British Columbia, Canada
- Camera setup: Multiple
- Running time: 40–46 minutes
- Production company: Lark Productions

Original release
- Network: Slice
- Release: April 4, 2012 – April 9, 2013

Related
- The Real Housewives of Toronto

The Real Housewives of Vancouver is a Canadian reality television series that premiered on Slice on April 4, 2012. Developed as the first Canadian installment of The Real Housewives franchise, it aired two seasons.

The first season consisted of Jody Claman, Christina Kiesel, Reiko MacKenzie, Ronnie Negus and Mary Zilba.

Of the original housewives, Christina Kiesel and Reiko MacKenzie left after season one, which saw Claman, Negus and Zilba return for a second season alongside Amanda Hansen, Robin Reichman and Ioulia Reynolds.

The show's success allowed for the development of a similar spin-off series based in Toronto.

== Overview and casting ==
The show premiered on April 4, 2012. The two-hour premiere was the highest-rated premiere in the network's history, attracting 1.2 million viewers. The final episode of season 1 aired on July 4, 2012.

On May 30, 2012, Slice announced that the series was renewed for a second season. Production for season two began on July 9, 2012 with Jody Claman, Ronnie Seterdahl Negus, and Mary Zilba returning with new cast members, Amanda Hansen, Ioulia Reynolds, and Robin Richmond Reichman, whom Slice described as a "former party girl", a "Russian-born beauty" and a "southern belle" respectively. The second season premiered on February 5, 2013. Slice chose to pass on a reunion for the second season in order to provide more episodes rather than having to cut the season even shorter.

On June 6, 2013, Slice announced that it had put the series "on hold" while it explored other programming. On June 27, 2014, Jody Claman stated she was no longer a celebrity during her divorce trial. While the show has not been on air since 2013, Slice have not confirmed nor denied that it has been cancelled. In 2016, former cast members were contacted for a "Where Are They Now?" segment that Slice holds on their main site.

In June 2022 some of the Housewives were contracted for a 2 Part reunion to air in July 2023. On August 2nd 2024, a hiatus was announced due to unforeseen circumstances.

=== Timeline of housewives ===
Main cast members
Cast member	Seasons	
Cast member	1	2
Jody Claman	Main	Main
Christina Kiesel	Main	
Reiko MacKenzie	Main	
Ronnie Negus	Main	Main
Mary Zilba	Main	Main
Amanda Hansen		Main
Robin Reichman		Main
Ioulia Reynolds		Main
Friends of the housewives
Mia Deakin	Friend	Friend
Marika Palmer	Friend	Guest

== Episodes ==
List of The Real Housewives of Vancouver episodes
Season	Episodes	Originally released	
Season	Episodes	First released	Last released
1	15	April 4, 2012	July 4, 2012
2	10	February 5, 2013	April 9, 2013

== International broadcast ==
The series has received rather critical and commercial success outside of Canada. The series along with the U.S. installments have aired on Australian cable network Arena, which is home to its own installments, The Real Housewives of Melbourne and Sydney. In the United Kingdom, the British free to air channels ITV2 and later ITVBe have also aired the series. It has never officially aired in the U.S., but episodes were briefly available to watch online on Hulu.

On April 1, 2022, both seasons were made available on Tubi, marking it the second time in almost a decade that the show has become available in the U.S. however as of May 2023, it has been removed from the streaming service.

In November 2025, both seasons became available for streaming on Peacock, NBCUniversal’s streaming platform, marking the third time the series has been available in the United States and the first under NBCUniversal ownership.

== Awards and nominations ==
Award nominations for The Real Housewives of Vancouver
Year	Type	Award	Result
2013	1st Canadian Screen Awards	Best Reality/Competition Program or Series	Nominated
