= Rosemary Siemens =

Canadian violinist and vocalist

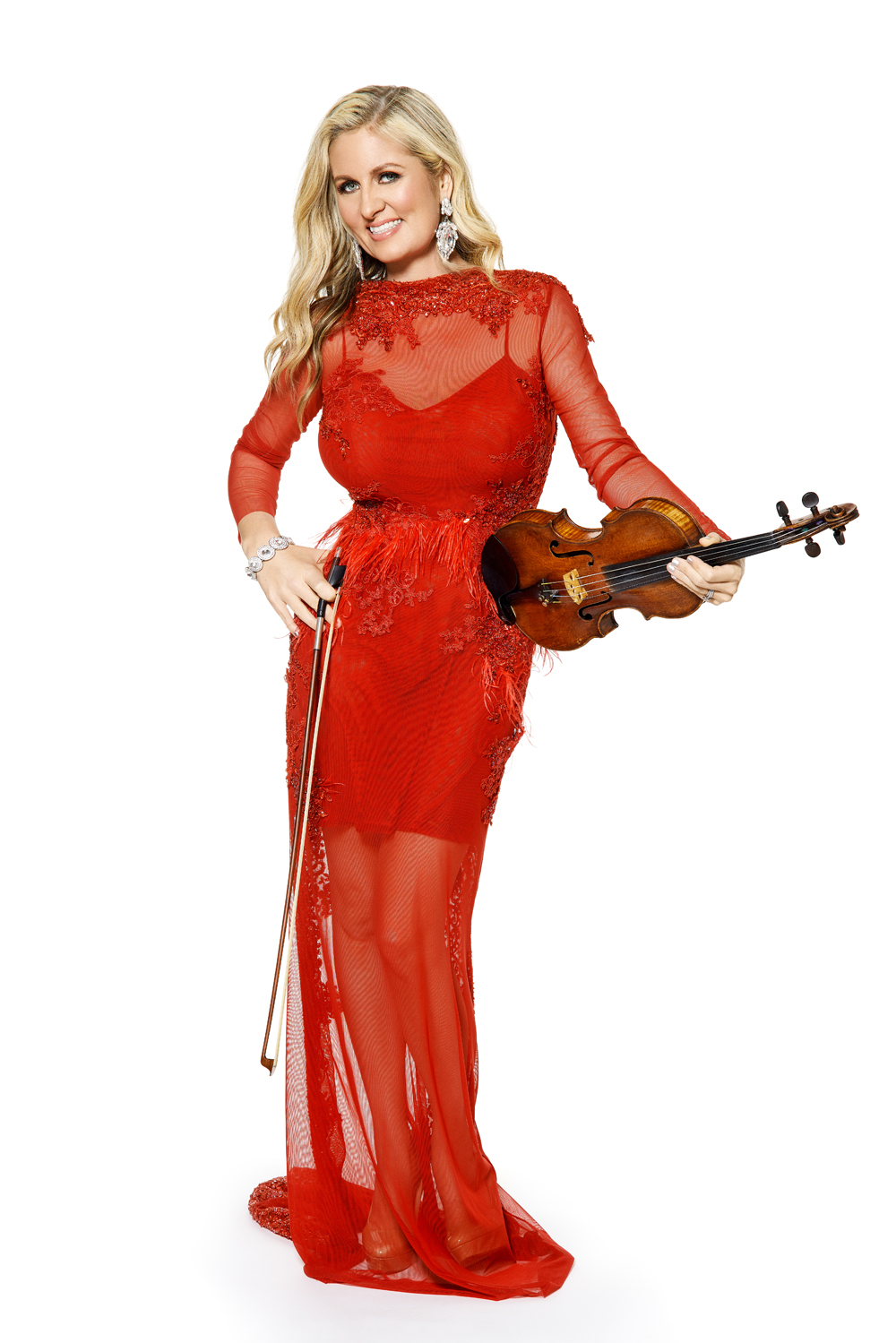

Background information
- Born: Rosemary Joy Siemens; Winnipeg, Manitoba, Canada
- Origin: Plum Coulee, Manitoba, Canada
- Genres: Classical, Pop, Christian, Bluegrass
- Occupations: Musician, composer, singer-songwriter
- Instruments: Vocals, violin, piano
- Years active: 2002–present
- Labels: Plum Coulee Records, Shoreline Songs, SaxAndViolin Records, Independent
- Website: www.rosemarysiemens.com

YouTube information
- Channel: RosemarySiemens
- Subscribers: 733 thousand
- Views: 202 million
- Last updated: 4 August 2026

Rosemary Joy Siemens is a Canadian violinist and vocalist originally from Plum Coulee, Manitoba. She has performed at the Grand Ole Opry, four times at St. Peter's Basilica at The Vatican, four times at Carnegie Hall, for two U.S. presidents and Canadian Prime Ministers, and was the first violinist to perform at the Sistine Chapel at the Vatican since its first mass in 1483. She was awarded the Queen Elizabeth Diamond Jubilee Medal and Queen Elizabeth II Platinum Jubilee Medal for her contribution to the arts in Canada and is married to saxophonist and film composer Eli Bennett with whom she records and performs with their instrumental duo SaxAndViolin.

== Biography ==
=== Early life ===
Siemens grew up on her family's century-old farm outside of Plum Coulee, Manitoba, and went to school in Altona. She took up the violin and piano at three years old under the tutelage of Lilian Toews, and later Elizabeth Lupton, and learned improvisation through playing hymns with her mother, Mary Siemens. She was a member of the Mennonite Children's Choir and under the direction of Helen Litz performed around the world with tours to Japan, China, South Korea, Hong Kong, Europe, The Middle East, and for President Jimmy Carter.

Before graduating from secondary school, she received her ARCT diploma (Associate of the Royal Conservatory of Music in Toronto), was awarded seven silver medals for receiving the highest mark in Manitoba for violin and piano exams, and was recognized as one of the most awarded young violinists in Manitoba. After graduating W.C. Miller Collegiate, she attended the University of British Columbia where she completed her undergrad in violin performance under Andrew Dawes.

She studied for one year Florida International University under Robert Davidovici before transferring to the University of Miami Frost School of Music to complete her master's degree in violin performance where she studied with Robert Rozek. While studying in Miami, she was concertmaster for the University of Miami Symphony Orchestra, guest conductor for the Florida Youth Symphony, and was a member of Ibis Trio which performed across the US, Belgrade, Macedonia, Switzerland, and Italy. She also performed with the Miami Bach Society Chamber Orchestra as concertmaster on a tour of France. After completing her master's, Siemens returned to Vancouver to complete an artist diploma in violin performance under Robert Rozek from the Vancouver Academy of Music.

=== Career ===
Siemens was a violinist for the Canadian Tenors featuring Joey Niceforo, Paul Ouellette, Leon Leontaridis, and Giovanni Amenta. When the group split, Niceforo founded a new group called Destino, featuring Niceforo, Terance Reddick, Siemens and Roy Tan on piano. The group released one album entitled Beginning Again and performed concerts at the Vancouver Winter Olympics, Children's Miracle Network at Walt Disney World and the Miss America pageant in Las Vegas. They also appeared on NBC and ABC TV networks, Entertainment Tonight, Canada AM, and Etalk.

Siemens was a guest soloist with the Abbotsford Symphony Orchestra performing the Mendelssohn violin concerto. The concert took place on November 19, 2004, at Central Heights Church in Abbotsford, British Columbia.

Siemens performed for Donald Trump for a private event at his Mar-a-Lago home in January 2006. Talking before Siemens' performance, Trump joked, "You better play well or you're fired."

In 2005, Siemens collaborated with pianist Loren Hiebert to release her debut hymn album entitled Take My Hand, featuring twenty-one hymns, including "Holy, Holy, Holy", "Amazing Grace", and "Blessed Assurance". The duo released a second album in 2007 entitled All Is Calm, All Is Bright, featuring Christmas hymns and traditional carols. Faspa's Gospel Songs, featuring Robyn Driedger-Klassen on vocals, was their third album together, and, in 2009, the duo released their fourth album Gospel, featuring twenty-three hymns including "Precious Lord, Take My Hand", "The Old Rugged Cross", and "Great Is Thy Faithfulness". Siemens' classical duo Diva Musica, featuring herself on violin and Victoria Gomon on piano, released their debut album Elegance in 2007, featuring their take on classical compositions "Ave Maria", "Moonlight Sonata", and "Nocturne".

In 2012, Siemens and pianist Roy Tan formed a piano/violin duo called Roy & Rosemary. Together they released two albums entitled Once Upon a Dream and A Timeless Christmas (Feat. Mary Zilba), produced by Daryl Bennett. Their version of Leonard Cohen's "Hallelujah" went viral on YouTube with over 26 million views.

Golden West Broadcasting commissioned Manitoba composer Victor Davies to compose "The Journey (Violin Concerto No. 2)", for Siemens. The Mennonite Concerto, featuring Siemens as a soloist with the Winnipeg Symphony Orchestra had the world premiere on December 2, 2012, at Centennial Hall in Winnipeg. In 2015, Roy & Rosemary were the featured guest performers alongside the Winnipeg Symphony Orchestra for the WSO Holiday Express tour that featured four concerts in Manitoba, including Steinbach, Virden, Winkler and Portage la Prairie.

Siemens' debut solo album Plum Coulee, My Home, released in 2016, was inspired by her love of bluegrass and fiddle music and was a tribute to the town of Plum Coulee, Manitoba, where she grew up. The album, featuring Siemens' original compositions, was her vocal debut and was nominated for four Covenant Awards, winning the Covenant Award for Southern Gospel/Country Album of the Year. The album featured GRAMMY Award-winning musician Carl Jackson and violinist Buddy Spicher. Siemens released the album in a live concert at Plum Coulee's annual festival Plum Fest, backed by her bluegrass band The Sweet Sound Revival. During the concert, the town of Plum Coulee unveiled a sign dedicated to Siemens that read "Plum Coulee, Home of Rosemary Siemens" to be placed at the edge of the town on Manitoba Highway 14.

While at the Americana Music Association’s Gospel Brunch in September 2016, Siemens shared the stage with Grammy Award-winner Cece Winans during the event's closing jam. In December, while flying to Calgary for a concert, a winter storm caused equipment to malfunction at the Calgary Airport and Siemens gave an impromptu concert for passengers stuck inside the airport. While on a U.S. tour, she performed an impromptu solo violin version of "America the Beautiful" for a retired U.S. Veteran at a Cracker Barrel restaurant in Wisconsin Dells, Wisconsin.

In 2017, Siemens' duo Roy & Rosemary were guest soloists with the Chilliwack Symphony Orchestra & Chorus. In March 2017, Siemens, along with her band The Sweet Sound Revival, embarked on their "Have a Little Faith" Canadian tour that saw concerts in Brandon, Gretna, Winnipeg, Saskatoon, Regina, Calgary, Kamloops, Penticton, West Vancouver, and Abbotsford. At the Canadian Conservative Party Leadership Convention held at the Toronto Congress Centre in May 2017, Siemens was the music director for the event with performances that included the event's opening number, O Canada, and music between the candidate's speeches. She was also the music director for the previous Conservative Convention held at the Vancouver Convention Centre in Vancouver, BC, where she performed for Prime Minister Stephen Harper with her duo SaxAndViolin.

In late 2017, to early 2018, Siemens' duo Roy & Rosemary embarked on a U.S. tour that saw them perform thirty-five concerts across the U.S. midwest. At the 53rd Canadian National Prayer Breakfast in Ottawa, Ontario, on May 8, 2018, Siemens performed her original songs "Path of Prayer" and "Have a Little Faith" for an audience of Canadian leaders that included Prime Minister Justin Trudeau and Conservative Party Leader Andrew Scheer. Later in 2018, Siemens and her bluegrass band performed at the Juno Awards Juno Fest in Vancouver (presented by CBC Music) and were also featured performers for the Harvest For Kids event in Southern Manitoba – a charity event for Children's Camps International that set a Guinness World Record for the most combine harvesters working simultaneously in a single field. She also composed the theme song for the event entitled "Heavenly Harvest", which won a Covenant Award for Country Song of the Year. Siemens' debut performance at The Grand Ole Opry was the closing number for the Inspirational Country Music Awards, where she performed "Jesus Loves Me" alongside Chris Golden accompanied by the Huckabee Band to a standing ovation. At the event, she was nominated for four Inspirational Country Music Awards. In December 2019, Siemens' "I'll Be Home For Christmas Tour" with her band The Sweet Sound Revival saw sold-out shows on their three Manitoba concerts in Winnipeg, Winkler, and Rosenort. In August, 2021, Siemens won Bluegrass Artist of the Year at the 2019 Inspirational Country Music Awards. The awards had been postponed due to COVID-19, but were held in Sevierville, Tennessee, on August 26, 2021.

=== Vatican Performances ===
Siemens was the first solo instrumentalist to perform at the Sistine Chapel at the Vatican since its first mass in 1483. Siemens's performance at the Sistine Chapel took place on February 19, 2014, for an event entitled Spiritual Elevation as part of the Fondazione Pro Musica e Arte Sacra where she was a guest soloist alongside vocalist Mary Zilba and harpist Mark Edward Spencer. Siemens, Zilba, and Spencer performed a medley that included hymns "Amazing Grace" and "Be Thou My Vision". The performance took place in concert with the Continuo Arts Symphonic Chorus, led by conductor Candace Wicke. Siemens also joined the Continuo Arts Symphonic Chorus for a Requiem entitled "Requiem For My Mother", composed by Stephen Edwards. On February 20, 2014, Siemens accompanied the Continuo Arts Symphonic Chorus for a performance at St. Peter's Basilica for evening mass. Previously, on November 21, 2008, she performed with the Continuo Arts Symphonic Chorus at St. Peter's Basilica for evening mass. She also joined the City of Prague Philharmonic Orchestra for a concert at Sant'Ignazio, Rome on November 22, 2008.

On November 19, 2016, Siemens performed a piece she co-composed with Roy Tan entitled "The Courtial Concerto" for Dr. Hans-Albert Courtial. Siemens and pianist Roy Tan performed at Santa Maria sopra Minerva for the Fondazione Pro Musica e Arte Sacra, an event Courtial founded that's known as "the biggest sacred music festival in the world". On November 20, 2020, Siemens and Tan performed again for Hans-Albert Courtial in a private reception at The Vatican held at Residenza San Paolo VI. Siemens performed for a mass at St. Peter's Basilica on November 17, 2016, with the Continuo Arts Symphonic Chorus, directed by Candace Wicke.

In the fall of 2019, Siemens returned for a fourth time to perform at the Vatican with her husband Eli Bennett and their duo SaxAndViolin on November 9, 2019. Together, they performed for a private event called the Rome Summit that brought together Christian leaders from around the world, hosted in Vatican City. At the event, Siemens also lectured about the importance of hymns and her experience of performing at the Sistine Chapel.

In July, 2023, Siemens returned to Italy for an 8-day concert tour with the Continuo Arts Foundation Symphonic Chorus, directed by Candace Wicke. Siemens performed concerts at The Duomo in Milan on July 13, 2023, The Santa Trinita in Florence on July 15, 2023, a private concert at the Doria Pamphilj Gallery in Rome on July 17, 2023, and a mass at St. Peter's Basilica on July 18, 2023.

=== Carnegie Hall Performances ===
Siemens has performed four times at Carnegie Hall. On October 2, 2005, Siemens was a member of the orchestra that accompanied DJ Radar in a performance of hip hop and classical music for the premiere of a new composition called Concerto for Turntable, which had been commissioned for the Red Bull Artsehcro event. On November 30, 2009, Siemens was guest artist with her duo Diva Musica and concertmaster with the Continuo Arts Symphonic Chorus & Orchestra performing "A Carol Fantasy", composed by Stephen Edwards, conducted by Candace Wicke. On April 11, 2010, Siemens returned to Carnegie Hall as guest artist with Destino for a shared concert alongside narrator Tovah Feldshuh and The Continuo Arts Symphonic Youth Chorus & Choir conducted by Candace Wickie. On March 9, 2014, Siemens was concertmaster with the Continuo Arts Symphonic Orchestra and The National Sacred Honor Choir, performing the Mozart Requiem and Beethoven's Choral Fantasy, conducted by Brandon Johnson.

=== God Save The Queen ===
In 2021, Siemens and her husband Eli Bennett recorded their own SaxAndViolin version of “God Save The Queen” featuring a 400-piece symphony orchestra and choir created by just the two of them. Her Majesty Queen Elizabeth II took note of the couple's version and sent a letter of thanks to Siemens and Bennett from Windsor Castle. Shortly after, in a ceremony held June 17, 2022, at Matsqui Centennial Auditorium in Abbotsford, BC, Bennett and Siemens were awarded the Queen Elizabeth II Platinum Jubilee Medals by Abbotsford M.P. Ed Fast. On September 10, 2022, after Her Majesty Queen Elizabeth II had died, Bennett and Siemens performed their version of "God Save The Queen" as a tribute to Her Majesty to open the 2022 Conservative Party of Canada Leadership Election in Ottawa, Ontario.

=== SaxAndViolin ===
Siemens' instrumental duo SaxAndViolin, featuring herself on violin and her husband Eli Bennett on saxophone, released their debut album on Valentine's Day, 2020, entitled Can't Help Falling In Love (Instrumental Love Songs), Vol. 1 featuring instrumental love songs that inspired their love story. The album charted No. 3 on the Canadian iTunes Pop Chart and their cover of Lauren Daigle's song "You Say" won a 2020 Covenant Award for Instrumental Song of the Year. In 2022, they won a Covenant Award for Instrumental Artist of the Year, and were nominated again in the same category in 2023.

=== Instrument ===
Siemens performs on a Claude Pierray violin that was made in France in 1714 that was bought for her by a patron.

=== Violin incident ===
On April 27, 2016, after Siemens finished performing at an event entitled "Disruption 2016" for the Museum of Contemporary Art Santa Barbara in Goleta, California, her violin was stolen. Police were called and a search of the hotel and surrounding area proceeded in an attempt to find the stolen violin. At 4 am, a man who had heard of the theft of the violin arrived at the hotel and, saying he worked in prison ministries and would "put the word out on the street", offered a $2,000 cash reward for the safe return of the violin and to publicize it on radio and television. At 7 am, with the violin still missing, Siemens boarded a flight to her next concert in South Dakota. While waiting in Seattle for her connecting flight, she received a text from the hotel manager that read, "WE FOUND YOUR VIOLIN!" Siemens called the manager and learned that a young man dressed in a hoodie had walked into the hotel lobby, placed the violin on the front desk, and said "I hear you've been looking for this" before walking out the front door. Siemens has called the return of her stolen violin "a miracle" and often shares the story before performing her song "Have a Little Faith" at her concerts.

=== Sunday Hymn Serenade ===
In September 2019, Siemens launched a series on her Youtube channel called Sunday Hymn Serenade where she released a new hymn video every Sunday at 10 am EST along with an inspirational story. Siemens noted that Christian Hymns are disappearing from churches like never before and she made it her mission to do something about it. In addition to featuring classic hymns like "Amazing Grace", "How Great Thou Art", and "Great Is Thy Faithfulness", she closes every episode with her favorite catchphrase, "Thank you so much for helping me 'Bring Back The Hymns!'"

When the COVID-19 pandemic began and people were locked in their homes under quarantine orders in March 2020, Siemens launched a second series on her YouTube channel entitled Worship Wednesday, where she would release a new Christian worship song every Wednesday at 10 am EST in hopes of bringing hope and comfort to people. The series aired for three months and ended in May 2020, when quarantine restrictions began to loosen in North America. In May, 2021, Siemens relaunched her Wednesday hymn series, featuring a new hymn lyric video format filmed in a stunning location, premiering every Wednesday at 12:30pm EST on YouTube. The first episode featured the hymn "Nearer, My God, To Thee".

In September, 2023, Siemens launched her own radio show Sunday Hymn Serenade – radio edition on Golden West Broadcasting in Manitoba, featuring hymns from her Sunday Hymn Serenade YouTube show and the stories behind them.

== Personal life ==
On March 18, 2017, Siemens was on her "Have a Little Faith" Canadian tour and was performing at Buhler Hall in Gretna, Manitoba, when her boyfriend, saxophonist Eli Bennett, who was also on his own Canadian tour, entered through the back of hall playing Elvis's "Can't Help Falling In Love" on his saxophone. Once on stage, Bennett got down on one knee and proposed to Siemens in front of the entire audience. She said yes, and the couple were wed later that year on August 20, 2017, in a public wedding ceremony in Plum Coulee, Manitoba. The wedding weekend coincided with Plum Coulee's annual festival Plum Fest, and featured Eli & Rosemary in a horse-drawn carriage as parade marshals in the town's parade, an Eli, Rosemary & Friends Concert that featured award-winning musicians from across Canada, and fireworks. The public wedding ceremony was attended by 1,500 and live streamed by over 50,000 people via Facebook live. In September 2018, after performing 175 concerts in 100 cities in the nine months of their secret pregnancy, the couple welcomed their first son, Theodore Parker Bennett into the world. They announced the birth through a YouTube music video featuring a song Siemens wrote and Bennett produced entitled "You and Me". In 2020, Siemens won a Covenant Award for Children's Song of the Year for that same song. In April, 2021, after another nine month secret pregnancy, Eli & Rosemary welcomed their second son, Amadeus Alexander Bennett, into the world. They again announced the birth through a YouTube music video featuring a song Siemens wrote entitled "I'll Always Be With You".

== Awards and nominations ==
- 2012 Queen Elizabeth Diamond Jubilee Medal
- 2016 Global Music Award for Best Bluegrass/Country Album (Plum Coulee, My Home, winner)
- 2018 Covenant Award for Folk Album of the Year (Plum Coulee, My Home, nominated)
- 2018 Covenant Award for Gospel Song of the Year (Bring Back the Hymns, nominated)
- 2018 Covenant Award for Instrumental Song of the Year (Rosemary & Buddy's Bluegrass Jam featuring the legendary Buddy Spicher, nominated)
- 2018 Covenant Award for Southern Gospel/Country Album of the Year (Plum Coulee, My Home, winner)
- 2018 Inspirational Country Music Award for International Bluegrass Artist of the Year (nominated)
- 2018 Inspirational Country Music Award for Musician of the Year (nominated)
- 2018 Inspirational Country Music Award for Video of the Year (Amazing Grace, nominated)
- 2019 Covenant Award for Country Song of the Year (Heavenly Harvest, winner)
- 2019 Inspirational Country Music Award for Inspirational Bluegrass Artist of the Year (winner)
- 2020 Covenant Award for Children's Song of the Year (You and Me, winner)
- 2020 Covenant Award for Instrumental Song of the Year (SaxAndViolin, You Say, winner)
- 2020 Leo Award for Best Music Video (My Homeland, nominated)
- 2022 Queen Elizabeth II Platinum Jubilee Medal
- 2022 Covenant Award for Instrumental Artist of the Year (SaxAndViolin, winner)
- 2022 Covenant Award for Live Music Artist of the Year – Online or Concert (Sunday Hymn Serenade, nominated)
- 2022 Covenant Award for Folk Song of the Year (I’ll Always Be With You, nominated)
- 2023 Covenant Award for Instrumental Artist of the Year (SaxAndViolin, nominated)
- 2023 Covenant Award for Musical Collaboration of the Year (“Jesus Loves Me Hymn Medley” – Rosemary Siemens Feat. The Pacific Mennonite Children's Choir, nominated)
- 2023 Covenant Award for Children's Artist of the Year (“Jesus Loves Me Hymn Medley” – Rosemary Siemens Feat. The Pacific Mennonite Children's Choir, nominated)
- 2023 Covenant Award for Live Music Artist of the Year – Online or Concert (Sunday Hymn Serenade, nominated)

== Television ==
- Chef in Your Ear – 2015
- 100 Huntley Street – 2022
- Path To Creation – 2022

== Discography ==
=== Albums as leader or co-leader ===
- 2005: Take My Hand (Loren Hiebert & Rosemary Siemens)
- 2007: All Is Calm, All Is Bright (Loren Hiebert & Rosemary Siemens)
- 2007: Faspa's Gospel Songs (Loren Hiebert & Rosemary Siemens, Feat. Robyn Driedger-Klassen)
- 2007: Elegance (Diva Musica – Victoria Gomon & Rosemary Siemens)
- 2009: Gospel (Loren Hiebert & Rosemary Siemens)
- 2012: Once Upon a Dream (Roy & Rosemary)
- 2012: Victor Davies: Mennonite Concertos (The Winnipeg Symphony Orchestra featuring Rosemary Siemens)
- 2013: A Timeless Christmas (Roy & Rosemary Feat. Mary Zilba)
- 2016: Plum Coulee, My Home (Rosemary Siemens & The Sweet Sound Revival)
- 2020: Can't Help Falling In Love (Instrumental Love Songs), Vol. 1 (SaxAndViolin – Eli Bennett & Rosemary Siemens)
- 2020: Sunday Hymn Serenade, Vol. 1 (Rosemary Siemens)
- 2020: Sunday Hymn Serenade, Vol. 2 (Rosemary Siemens)
- 2021: Sunday Hymn Serenade, Vol. 3 (Rosemary Siemens)

=== Albums as a guest performer ===
- 2008: Dreams and Debris (A Sheep at the Wheel)
- 2011: Beginning Again (Destino)
- 2015: What the World Needs Now (WDF)
- 2016: Eternally Grateful (Warren Dean Flandez)
- 2017: Joey Niceforo (Joey Niceforo)
- 2018: Priceless (Joey Niceforo)

=== Singles as leader or co-leader ===
- 2017: Kiss The Rain (Roy & Rosemary)
- 2018: Heavenly Harvest (Rosemary Siemens & The Sweet Sound Revival)
- 2018: Amazing Grace (Rosemary Siemens)
- 2018: You and Me (Rosemary Siemens Feat. SaxAndViolin)
- 2018: Away In a Manger (Roy & Rosemary)
- 2018: Unchained Melody (Roy & Rosemary)
- 2019: In The Garden (Rosemary Siemens)
- 2019: I'll Be Home For Christmas (Rosemary Siemens & The Sweet Sound Revival)
- 2020: Ave Maria (Roy & Rosemary)
- 2020: How Great Thou Art (Rosemary Siemens)
- 2020: Ultimate Hymn Medley: Just as I Am / What a Friend We Have in Jesus / How Great Thou Art / His Eye Is on the Sparrow (Rosemary Siemens)
- 2020: Silent Night (Rosemary Siemens)
- 2021: I'll Always Be With You (Rosemary Siemens Feat. SaxAndViolin)
- 2021: God Save The Queen (SaxAndViolin)
- 2023: Jesus Loves Me Hymn Medley (Rosemary Siemens Feat. The Pacific Mennonite Children's Choir)
