= Daryl Bennett (musician) =

- Occupations: Composer, film producer, record producer, session musician
- Instruments: Drums, saxophone, Cello
- Years active: 1970s –present

Daryl Bennett is a musician and film score composer whose music has been heard on films such as Voyage of the Unicorn, Wishmaster: The Prophecy Fulfilled, Entrance, and television shows such as The Outer Limits, and Higher Ground. As a drummer, one of the artists he has recorded with is Long John Baldry on his It Still Ain't Easy album. He is the father of Eli Bennett, an award-winning jazz saxophonist.

== Background ==
He introduced his son Eli to music when Eli was twelve years old. Eli, who was the first born son used to make his bed in his father's studio. His son received the CBC Galaxie Award at the National Jazz Awards in Toronto around 2009.

== Film career ==
One of his earliest projects in soundtrack work was in the Roger Larry directed film Knocking on Heaven's Door which was released around 1994. He had multiple roles in the 2006 horror film. One as an actor in The Entrance, playing the Priest. He was also associate producer, film editor, and music composer.

=== Documentaries ===
He worked as composer and editor on the 2013 documentary film The Exhibition with Damon Vignale, and Miho Yamamoto. It received the Michael Sullivan Frontline Award for Journalism in a Documentary Film at the 2014 Salem Film Festival. For his work on The Exhibition, he received the Seattle Composers Alliance award as 2014 Winner of the Best Original Score. Along with son Eli, he provided the music for the film Human Harvest which features Nobel Peace Prize nominees David Matas and David Kilgour.

== Musician and producer ==
=== Musician ===
One of the bands he was a member of was The Philippe Lapointe Group which recorded the album, Natural Selection, released in 1987. Another group he was in was the Powder Blues Band which was formed in the late 1970s. As of 2011, he was still a member of the group.

=== Production and composition ===
Along with Jim Guttridge, he had a role in composing "Bethlehem (The World Is Gonna Hear About You)" which Andraé Crouch sung on his The Gift Of Christmas album, released in 1998. One of the artists he has produced for is Canadian violinist Rosemary Siemens on her Once Upon a Dream album she recorded with Roy Tan.

== Discography ==
- Connie Scott – Hold On - Image 7 ICD 7818 - 1987 - (Percussion)
- The Philippe Lapointe Group - Natural Selection - Progress Records PR001 - 1987 - (Drums)
- Hope Sterling – The Way Things Are - Image 7 ICD 7826 - (Drums, percussion)
- Connie Scott - Christmas In Your Heart - Image 7 ICD 7828 - 1988 - (Drums, percussion)
- Bob Hanson – 'Nuff Said - Lorotz LZ3090CD - 1990 - (Percussion), (Drums on "'Nuff Said")
- Andraé Crouch – The Gift Of Christmas - Qwest Records 9 47091-2, Warner Bros. Records 9 47091-2 - 1999
  (Arranger, music composer, Synthesizer programing on "Bethlehem (The World Is Gonna Hear About You)"
- Amos Garrett - Make My Home in My Shoes - Stony Plain 1132 - 1988/1991/1995 - (Drums)
- Long John Baldry - It Still Ain't Easy - Stony Plain Records SPCD 1163 - 1991 - (Drums)
- Harriet Frost – Twilight Conversations - Lost Horizon (EP) - 1993 - (Drums, percussion)
- Hal Beckett - Natural Places - Marquis Records 5170 - 1995 (Drums, Percussion)
- Harriet Frost – Random Days - Lost Horizon LHP02 - 2009 - (Drums, percussion)

== Films (selective) ==
Documentary
Title	Role	Director	Year	Notes #
Scams, Schemes, and Scoundrels	Composer	Aerlyn Weissman	1996	
Dinosaur Park	Sound designer	John Robichaud	1998	
Nash	Music	Michael Hamilton; Corey Ogilvie	2013	
The Exhibition	Composer, editor	Damon Vignale	2013	
Take Back Your Power	Story, composer	Josh Del Sol	2013	
Human Harvest	Composer	Leon Lee	2014	
The Connected Universe	Producer, composer, editor	Malcolm Carter	2016	

Feature films
Title	Role	Director	Year	Notes #
Showdown at Williams Creek	Music producer	Allan Kroeker	1991	
Lighthouse	Sound designer	Paul Tucker	1991	
Knocking on Heaven's Door	Music	Roger Larry	1992	
Once in a Blue Moon	Orchestrator, composer	Philip Spink	1995	
Ronnie & Julie	Composer, orchestrator	Philip Spink	1997	Tv move
Honeymoon	music supervisor	Joan Carr-Wiggin	1997	
The Process	Sound designer, music supervisor	Ernie Reyes Jr.	1998	
Big and Hairy	Composer	Philip Spink	1998	
The Darklings	Composer	Jeffrey Reiner	1999	
Dangerous Attraction	Composer	Penelope Buitenhuis	2000	
Voyage of the Unicorn	Composer	Philip Spink	2001	Tv movie
Wishmaster 3: Devil Stone	Composer	Chris Angel	2001	
Wishmaster 4: The Prophecy Fulfilled	Composer	Chris Angel	2002	
Mu Sa Do	Composer	Nastasha Baron	2002	
The Entrance	Composer, editor, writer, producer, actor (Priest)	Damon Vignale	2006	
Engaged to Kill	Composer	Matthew Hastings	2006	Tv movie
Lost Solace	Composer	Chris Scheuerman	2016	
The Bleeding Edge	Composer	Leon Lee	2016	
The Poem	Composer	Bobby Del Rio	2016	Short
