= Ottawa Jazz Festival =

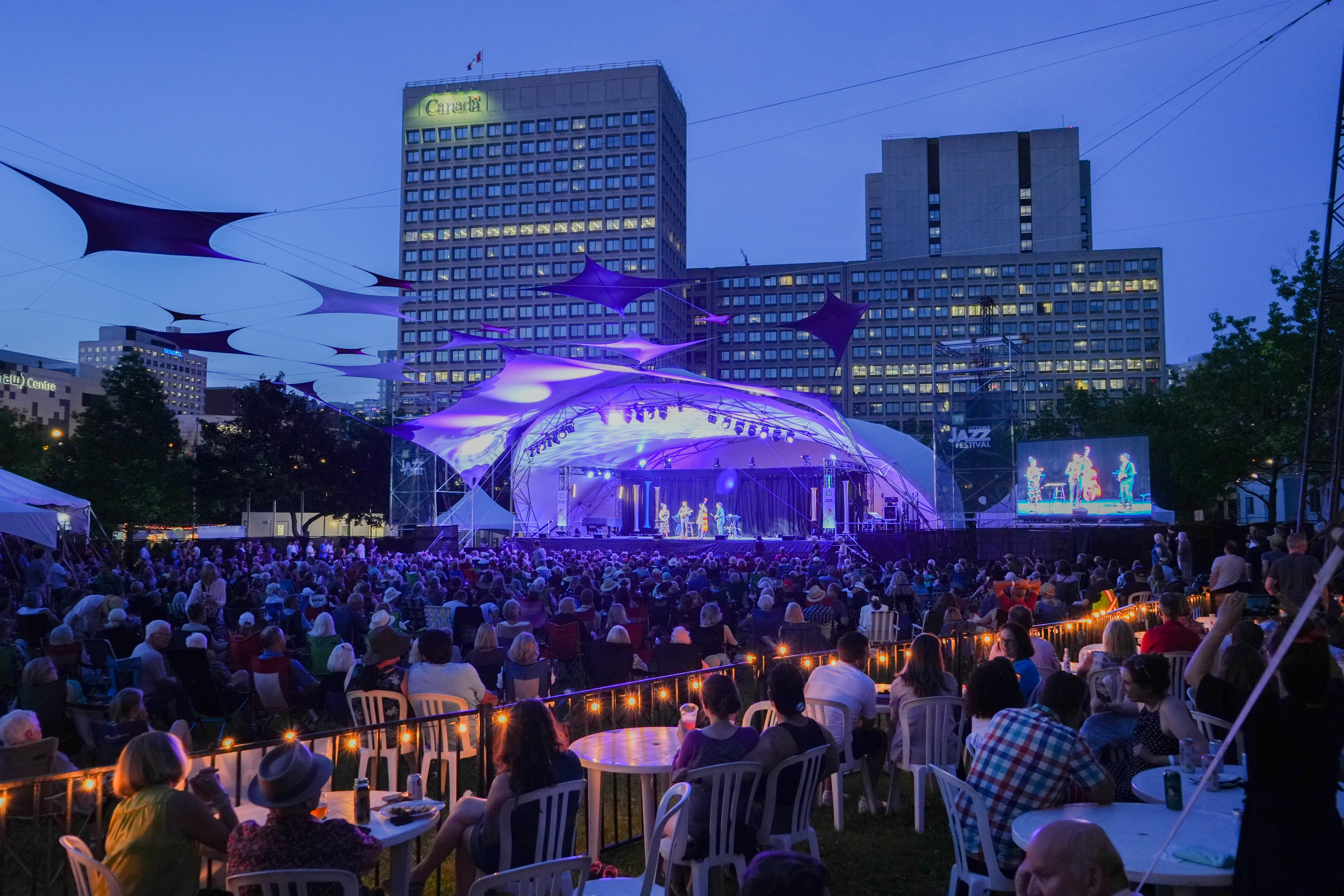
- Main Stage at Confederation Park
- Genre: Jazz Festival
- Dates: June 19–28, 2026
- Locations: Ottawa, Ontario, Canada
- Years active: 1980–present
- Website: ottawajazzfestival.com
- Jermaine Holmes - Fri, Oct 11, 2024 at 8pm Flat Earth Society Orchestra - Wed, Nov 6, 2024 at 7:30pm

The Ottawa Jazz Festival is a music festival held annually in Ottawa, Canada. It showcases a wide range of jazz genres, including swing, jive, fusion jazz, hot jazz, boogie as well as diverse cultures and traditions. The festival claims to bring "a wide range of Canadian and international musical greats to Canada's capital." Additionally, it features new and emerging talent covering a spectrum from pop and rock to lush harmonies. While jazz is the core focus, the festival also includes music from genres such as such as blues, rock and indie.

In previous years, the event has drawn up to 300,000 visitors and featured over 850 artists and more than 100 concerts.

== History ==
The festival was established in 1980 when local musicians Bob Misener, Tony Pope and Bill Shuttleworth came together to organize a weekend of jazz music in Major's Hill Park.

In 2007, Dave Brubeck attracted nearly 10,000 fans (filling the park) to a crowd-thrilling show. Brubeck returned in 2010 to play with the National Arts Centre Orchestra.

In 2020, the COVID-19 pandemic forced the cancellation of the festival. In place of the event, a virtual concert series named Tenacity was streamed to both domestic and international audiences. In August 2021, despite many pandemic-related restrictions, the festival returned for a four-day span of live and virtual concerts with over 50 artists performing. In 2022, the festival made a full in-person return with a nine-day lineup featuring artists like the Punch Brothers, Kamasi Washington, Holly Cole, Cory Wong, Cory Henry, Jazz at Lincoln Center Orchestra, and more.

In 2024, Petr Cancura, who had been the festival's artistic director, became festival executive director as well.

Since 2009, the festival has brought in over $448 million in tourism spending as of 2023.

== Programming ==
From 1990 to 2010, the wide-ranging but jazz-centred sound of the festival was the work of the festival's programming director, Jacques Émond.

A francophone tribute to Emond from 2003: "Parce qu'il connaît si bien la musique, Jacques Émond est un directeur artistique qui ose. A chacune des éditions du festival, il parvient à concocter une programmation variée, allant des accents les plus classiques aux sonorités les plus contemporaines, sans négliger les rythmes entraînants de la salsa et la bossa-nova."

Petr Cancura took over the role in 2011.

== Winter Jazz Festival ==
The Ottawa Winter Jazz Festival hosts shows that aim to foster an environment for creative interactions among jazz artists in the off-season.

In 2023, a two-day festival ran in February and featured performances by artists such as Sarah Neufield, Kenny Barron and Thus Owls.
