= Human Harvest (film) =

2014 film by Leon Lee

- Poster of Human Harvest
- Directed by: Leon Lee
- Written by: Leon Lee
- Music by: Daryl Bennett; Eli Bennett
- Production company: Flying Cloud Productions Inc.
- Release date: December 8, 2014
- Running time: 52 minutes
- Country: Canada
- Language: English

Human Harvest (Chinese: 活摘) is a 2014 documentary film, directed by Vancouver filmmaker Leon Lee, which follows the investigative work by legal counsel David Matas and Canadian lawmaker David Kilgour on whether and how hospitals in China harvested and sold organs from tens of thousands of executed prisoners of conscience, mainly Falun Gong practitioners.

== Production ==
The film is supported by the Canada Media Fund’s Diverse Languages Program, which supports productions on Canadian diversity. The program funds projects in languages other than English, French, or Canadian Aboriginal languages. Human Harvest was produced originally in Mandarin.

In addition to the work by filmmaker Leon Lee, two Canadian film companies contributed to the production of the film: Principal of Flying Cloud Productions in Vancouver, and Toronto-based Mark Media.

== Impact ==
=== Comments by Peabody Awards judges ===
According to Peabody Awards judges:

With powerful testimonials about the intricacies of the trade and the human cost, including interviews with Chinese doctors who confide they’ve been coerced into removing organs from live political prisoners, this is a harrowing exposé of a fiendish system of forced organ donor transplants.

Peabody Awards winners must receive unanimous support from the 17 members of the Peabody Board of Jurors.

=== News ===
On April 7, 2015, Dateline of SBS Australia broadcast the film and urged the Australian Government to do something to help stop illegal organ trade in China. The Sydney Morning Herald reported that the investigators, including David Matas and his colleagues, are "pushing for the perpetrators to stand before the International Criminal Court for crimes against humanity".

In 2015, the Chinese Communist Party said it would stop harvesting the organs of executed prisoners, an announcement about which the filmmaker Lee is skeptical.

=== Film companies ===
It is reported that the two Canadian film companies, which worked on the documentary, will continue to work on other projects, including an in-depth investigation on the controversies around the Confucius Institutes.

== Awards ==
- 2015, November, AIB Media Excellence Awards, International Investigative Documentary.
- 2015, April, Peabody Awards.
- 2015, Salem Film Fest Awards - "The Michael Sullivan Frontline Award for Journalism in a Documentary Film".
- 2015, Flathead Lake International Cinemafest, "Best Picture-Documentary".
- 2015, Big Muddy Film Festival, Best Documentary Feature.
- 2014, Global film Awards, "Humanitarian Awards: Grand Prize".
- 2014, Dec, Viewster Online Film Festival, 1st Place.
- 2014, Nov, Canada Hamilton Film Festival, Best Documentary.

== See also ==
- Free China: The Courage to Believe
- Kilgour–Matas report
- Organ harvesting from Falun Gong practitioners in China
- Persecution of Falun Gong
- Ethan Gutmann
