= Liu Ching =

Liu Ching may refer to:

- Liu Jing (disambiguation)
- Liu Qing (disambiguation)
