= Gao Yichen =

Chinese politician (born 1950)

- 高以忱

Deputy Minister of the Ministry of State Security
- In office Unknown–Unknown

Deputy Director of the 610 Office
- In office 2005–Unknown

Personal details
- Born: 1950 (age 75–76) Heilongjiang Province, China
- Party: Chinese Communist Party (expelled in 2026)
- Education: Heilongjiang University

Gao Yichen (Chinese: 高以忱; born 1950) is a former Chinese politician, who served as the deputy minister of the Ministry of State Security and the deputy director of the 610 Office.

== Career ==
Gao has graduated from Heilongjiang University in Russian language major. He worked overseas for a long time, which served as the journalist stationed in the Soviet Union and the United States of Guangming Daily. Later he was served as the deputy minister of the Ministry of State Security. In 2005, he concurrent with the deputy Director of the 610 Office and the deputy secretary of the Central Political and Legal Affairs Commission.

He was resigned from the public offices no later than March 2017, and served as a person in charge in a social organization.

== Investigation ==
On 9 June 2025, Gao was suspected of "serious violations of laws and regulations" by the Central Commission for Discipline Inspection (CCDI), the party's internal disciplinary body, and the National Supervisory Commission, the highest anti-corruption agency of China. He was expelled from the party and dismissed from the public office on 20 January 2026.
