= Persecution of Falun Gong =

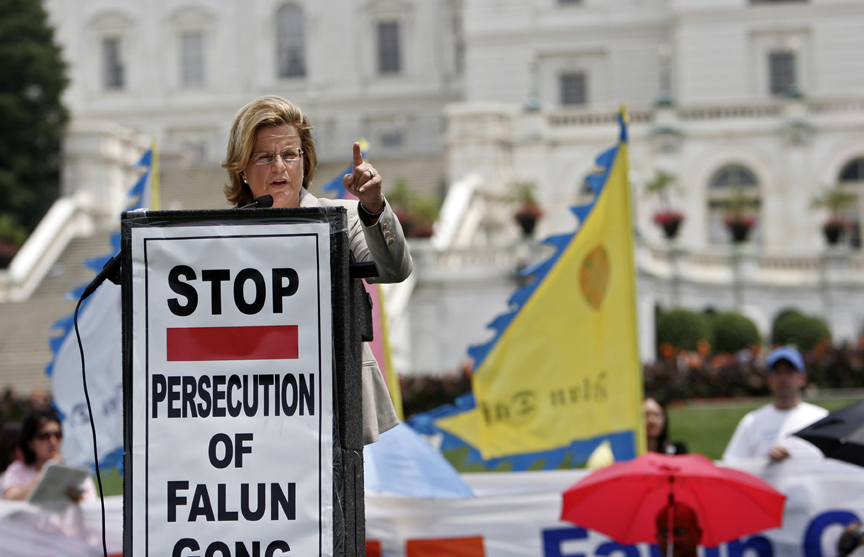
Then-member of the United States House of Representatives, Ileana Ros-Lehtinen, who co-sponsored a congressional resolution condemning organ harvesting from Falun Gong adherents, speaks at a rally in Washington, D.C.

In 1999, the Chinese Communist Party (CCP) initiated an ongoing campaign to eliminate the new religious movement Falun Gong in China, maintaining a doctrine of state atheism. It is characterized by a multifaceted propaganda campaign, a program of enforced ideological conversion and re-education and reportedly a variety of extralegal coercive measures such as arbitrary arrests, forced labor and physical torture, sometimes resulting in death.

Falun Gong was founded by its leader Li Hongzhi, who introduced it to the public in May 1992 in Changchun, Jilin. Li Hongzhi currently lives near Dragon Springs in Deerpark, New York, where Falun Gong's global headquarters are. Falun Gong combines meditation, qigong exercises, and moral teachings rooted in Buddhist and Taoist traditions. Following a period of rapid growth in the 1990s, the CCP launched a campaign to "eradicate" Falun Gong on 20 July 1999.

The Chinese government had alleged that Falun Gong was an "evil cult" or "heretical sect" and had used that official rationale to justify to ban and eliminate the movement. An extra-constitutional body called the 6-10 Office was created to lead the persecution of Falun Gong. The authorities mobilized the state media apparatus, judiciary, police, army, the education system, families and workplaces against the group. The campaign was driven by large-scale propaganda through television, newspaper, radio and the Internet. There are reports of systematic torture, illegal imprisonment, forced labor, organ harvesting and abusive psychiatric measures, with the apparent aim of forcing practitioners to recant their belief in Falun Gong.

Reports from the United States Congressional-Executive Commission on China and State Department include estimates that hundreds of thousands and perhaps millions of Falun Gong practitioners have been detained in "re-education through labor" camps, prisons and other detention facilities for refusing to renounce the spiritual practice. Former prisoners have reported that Falun Gong practitioners consistently received "the longest sentences and worst treatment" in labor camps, and in some facilities Falun Gong practitioners formed the substantial majority of detainees. As of 2009, at least 2,000 Falun Gong practitioners had been reportedly tortured to death in the persecution campaign. Some international observers and judicial authorities have described the campaign against Falun Gong as a genocide. In 2009, courts in Spain and Argentina indicted senior Chinese officials for genocide and crimes against humanity for their role in orchestrating the suppression of Falun Gong.

In 2006, allegations emerged that many Falun Gong practitioners had been killed to supply China's organ transplant industry. An initial investigation found that "the source of 41,500 transplants for the six-year period 2000 to 2005 is unexplained" and concluded that "there has been and continues today to be large scale organ seizures from unwilling Falun Gong practitioners". Ethan Gutmann estimates 65,000 Falun Gong practitioners were killed for their organs from 2000 to 2008. Following additional analysis, the researchers significantly raised the estimates on the number of Falun Gong practitioners who may have been targeted for organ harvesting. In 2008, United Nations Special Rapporteurs reiterated their requests for "the Chinese government to fully explain the allegation of taking vital organs from Falun Gong practitioners and the source of organs for the sudden increase in organ transplants that has been going on in China since the year 2000".

== Background ==
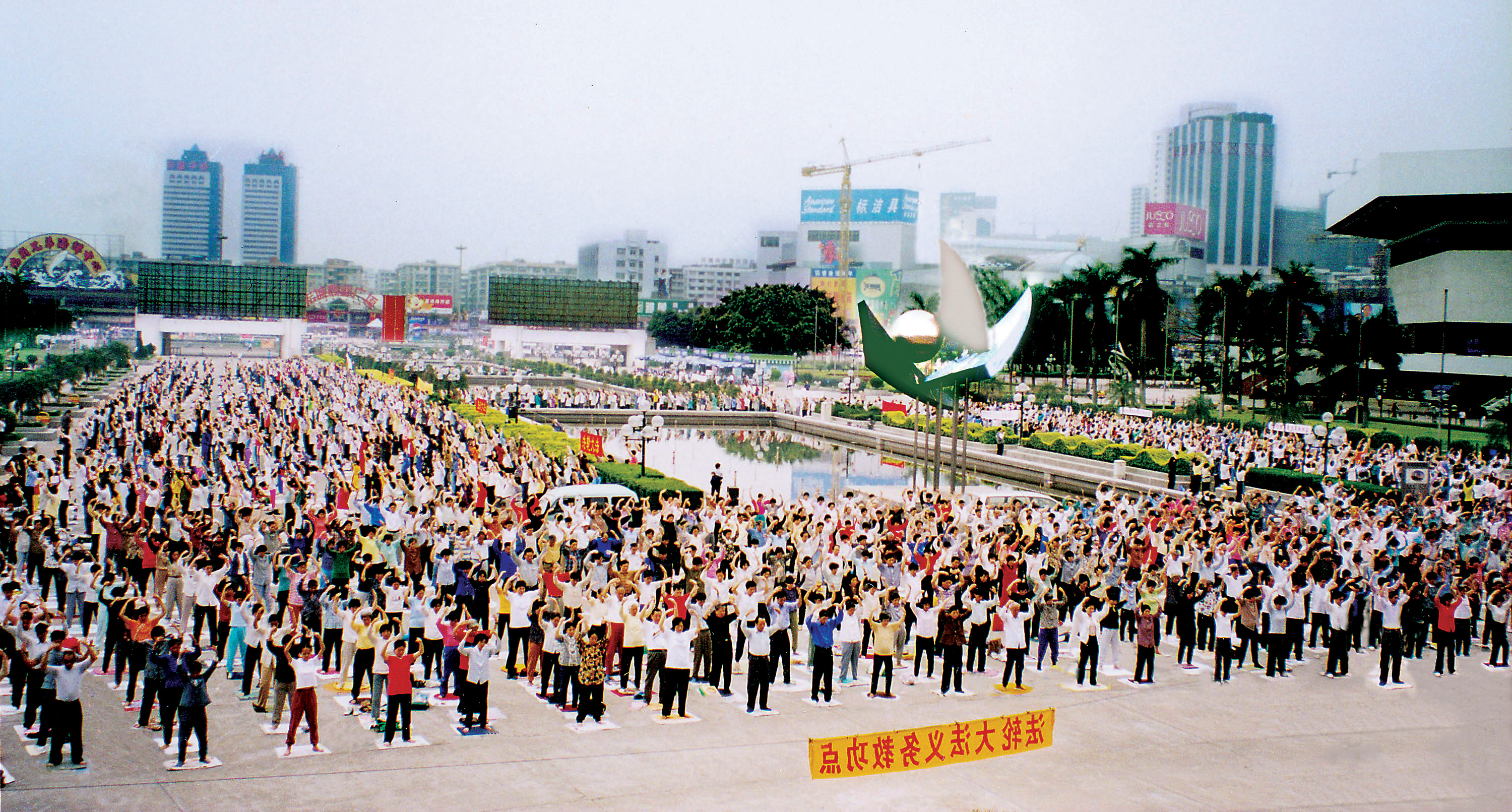
Morning Falun Dafa exercises in Guangzhou. The banner reads "Falun Dafa Free-Teaching Exercise Site". Falun Gong's popularity worried senior officials of the CCP.

Falun Gong, also known as Falun Dafa, is a new religious movement that combines meditation, qigong energy exercises, and moral guidance rooted in Buddhist and Taoist traditions. Falun Gong is based around the teachings of its founder and leader: China-born Li Hongzhi. According to NBC News, to his followers, Li is "a God-like figure who can levitate, walk through walls and see into the future. His ultra-conservative and controversial teachings include a rejection of modern science, art and medicine, and a denunciation of homosexuality, feminism and general worldliness." Hongzhi instructs his followers to not talk about "Falun Gong's inner teachings" when talking to outsiders, contradictory to his teachings about "Truthfulness".

The practice of Falun Gong was first taught publicly by Li in Northeast China in the spring of 1992, towards the end of China's "qigong boom". Falun Gong initially enjoyed considerable official support during the early years of its development. It was promoted by the state-run Qigong Association and other government agencies. By the mid-1990s, however, Chinese authorities sought to rein in the influence of qigong practices and enacted more stringent requirements on the country's various qigong denominations. In 1995 authorities mandated that all qigong groups establish Communist Party branches. The government also sought to formalize ties with Falun Gong and exercise greater control over the practice. Falun Gong resisted co-optation, and instead filed to withdraw altogether from the state-run qigong association.

Following this severance of ties to the state, the group came under increasing criticism and surveillance from the country's security apparatus and propaganda department of the Chinese Communist Party. Falun Gong books were banned from further publication in July 1996, and official news outlets began criticizing the group as a form of "feudal superstition", whose "theistic" orientation was at odds with the official ideology and national agenda.

Tensions continued to escalate through the late 1990s. By 1999, surveys estimated as many as 70 million people were practicing Falun Gong in China. Although some government agencies and senior officials continued expressing support for the practices, others grew increasingly wary of its size and capacity for independent organization.

On 22 April 1999, several dozen Falun Gong practitioners were beaten and arrested in the city of Tianjin while staging a peaceful sit-in. The practitioners were told that the arrest order came from the Ministry of Public Security, and that those arrested could be released only with the approval of Beijing authorities.

On 25 April, upwards of 10,000 Falun Gong practitioners assembled peacefully near the Zhongnanhai government compound in Beijing to request the release of the Tianjin practitioners and an end to the escalating harassment against them. It was Falun Gong practitioners' attempt to seek redress from the leadership by going to them and, "albeit very quietly and politely, making it clear that they would not be treated so shabbily." It was the first mass demonstration at the Zhongnanhai compound in the PRC's history, and the largest protest in Beijing since 1989. Several Falun Gong representatives met with then-premier Zhu Rongji, who assured them that the government was not against Falun Gong, and promised that the Tianjin practitioners would be released. The crowd outside dispersed peacefully, apparently believing that their demonstration had been a success. However, the uniformity and scale of the demonstration alarmed the Chinese Communist Party officials. Witnessing the organizational capacity of the Falun Gong practitioners, some officials saw Falun Gong as a direct threat to the state's authority and political control. Different from Zhu's conciliatory approach dealing with Falun Gong issue, security czar and politburo member Luo Gan was less conciliatory, and called on Jiang Zemin, the General Secretary of the Chinese Communist Party to find a decisive solution to the Falun Gong problem.

== Statewide persecution ==
On the night of 25 April 1999, then-Communist Party General Secretary Jiang Zemin issued a letter indicating his desire to see Falun Gong defeated. The letter expressed alarm at Falun Gong's popularity, particularly among Communist Party members. He reportedly called the Zhongnanhai protest "the most serious political incident since the '4 June' political disturbance in 1989."

At a meeting of the Politburo on 7 June 1999, Jiang described Falun Gong as a grave threat to Communist Party authority—"something unprecedented in the country since its founding 50 years ago"—and ordered the creation of a high-level committee to "get fully prepared for the work of disintegrating [Falun Gong]." Rumors of an impending crackdown began circulating throughout China, prompting demonstrations and petitions. The government publicly denied the reports, calling them "completely baseless" and offering assurances that it had never banned qigong activities.

Just after midnight on 20 July 1999, public security officers seized hundreds of Falun Gong practitioners from their homes in cities across China. Estimates on the number of arrests vary from several hundred to over 5,600. A Hong Kong newspaper reported that 50,000 individuals were detained in the first week of the crackdown. Four Falun Gong coordinators in Beijing were arrested and quickly tried on charges of "leaking state secrets". The Public Security Bureau ordered churches, temples, mosques, newspapers, media, courts and police to suppress Falun Gong. Three days of massive demonstrations by practitioners in some thirty cities followed. In Beijing and other cities, protesters were detained in sports stadiums. Editorials in state-run newspapers urged people to give up Falun Gong practice, and Communist Party members in particular were reminded that they were atheists and must not allow themselves to "become superstitious by continuing to practice Falun Gong."

Li Hongzhi responded with a "Brief Statement of Mine" on 22 July:

We are not against the government now, nor will we be in the future. Other people may treat us badly, but we do not treat others badly, nor do we treat people as enemies. We are calling for all governments, international organizations, and people of goodwill worldwide to extend their support and assistance to us in order to resolve the present crisis that is taking place in China.

=== Rationale ===
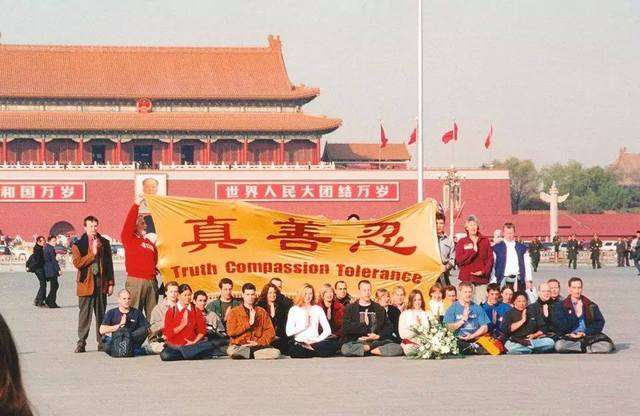
Falun Gong practitioners at Tiananmen Square appealing for an end to persecution

Following the protest at Zhongnanhai, Jiang Zemin viewed Falun Gong as the most serious political issue since the 1989 student protests. Chinese leadership viewed Falun Gong's mobilization power as significant and worried about how it could be used by its US-based leader who was beyond the reach of Chinese state authorities. Leaders thus believed that suppressing Falun Gong was important to winning "a political-ideological battle over the heart and mind of the masses."

A World Journal report suggested that certain high-level Party officials wanted to crack down on the practice for years, but lacked sufficient pretext until the protest at Zhongnanhai, which they claim was partly orchestrated by Luo Gan, a long-time opponent of Falun Gong. There were also reportedly rifts in the Politburo at the time of the incident. Willy Wo-Lap Lam writes that Jiang's campaign against Falun Gong may have been used to promote allegiance to himself; Lam quotes one party veteran as saying, "By unleashing a Mao-style movement [against Falun Gong], Jiang is forcing senior cadres to pledge allegiance to his line." Jiang is held by Falun Gong to be personally responsible for the final decision, and sources cited by The Washington Post state that, "Jiang Zemin alone decided that Falun Gong must be eliminated," and "picked what he thought was an easy target." Peerman cited reasons such as suspected personal jealousy of Li Hongzhi; Saich postulates that party leaders' anger at Falun Gong's widespread appeal, and ideological struggle. The Washington Post reported that members of the Politburo Standing Committee did not unanimously support the crackdown, and that "Jiang Zemin alone decided that Falun Gong must be eliminated." The size and reach of Jiang's anti–Falun Gong campaign surpassed that of many previous mass-movements.

Human Rights Watch notes that the crackdown on Falun Gong reflects historical efforts by the Chinese Communist Party to eradicate religion, which the government believed was inherently subversive. Some journalists believe that Beijing's reaction exposes its authoritarian nature and its intolerance for competing loyalty. The Globe and Mail wrote : "...any group that does not come under the control of the Party is a threat"; secondly, the 1989 protests may have heightened the leaders' sense of losing their grip on power, making them live in "mortal fear" of popular demonstrations. Craig Smith of the Wall Street Journal suggests that the government which has by definition no view of spirituality, lacks moral credibility with which to fight an expressly spiritual foe; the party feels increasingly threatened by any belief system that challenges its ideology and has an ability to organize itself. That Falun Gong, whose belief system represented a revival of traditional Chinese religion, was being practiced by many Communist Party members and members of the military was seen as particularly disturbing to Jiang Zemin. "Jiang accepts the threat of Falun Gong as an ideological one: spiritual beliefs against militant atheism and historical materialism. He [wished] to purge the government and the military of such beliefs".

The CCP deems Falun Gong as one of the "Five Poisons", a group that also includes the Uyghur World Congress, Tibetan separatists, Hong Kong democracy activists, and Taiwan independence advocates.

== Legal and political mechanisms ==
=== 610 Office ===
On 10 June the Party established the 610 Office, a Communist Party-led security agency responsible for coordinating the elimination of Falun Gong. The office was not created with any legislation, and there are no provisions describing its precise mandate. Because of this, it is sometimes described as an extralegal organization. Nonetheless, its tasks were "to deal with central and local, party and state agencies, which were called upon to act in close coordination with that office," according to UCLA professor James Tong. The leaders of the 610 Office are "able to call on top government and party officials...and draw on their institutional resources", and have personal access to the Communist Party General Secretary and the Premier.

The office is headed by a high-ranking member of the Communist Party's Politburo or Politburo Standing Committee. It is closely associated with the powerful Political and Legislative Affairs Committee of the Chinese Communist Party. Soon after the creation of the central 610 Office, local branches were established at each administrative level wherever populations of Falun Gong practitioners were present, including the provincial, district, municipal, and sometimes neighborhood levels. In some instances, 610 Offices have been established within large corporations and universities.

The main functions of the 610 Offices include coordinating anti–Falun Gong propaganda, surveillance and intelligence collection, and the punishment and "reeducation" of Falun Gong practitioners. The office is reportedly involved in the extrajudicial sentencing, coercive reeducation, torture, and sometimes death of Falun Gong practitioners.

Journalist Ian Johnson, whose coverage of the crackdown on Falun Gong earned him a Pulitzer Prize, wrote that the job of the 610 Office was "to mobilize the country's pliant social organizations. Under orders from the Public Security Bureau, churches, temples, mosques, newspapers, media, courts and police all quickly lined up behind the government's simple plan: to crush Falun Gong, no measures too excessive."

=== Official documents and circulars ===
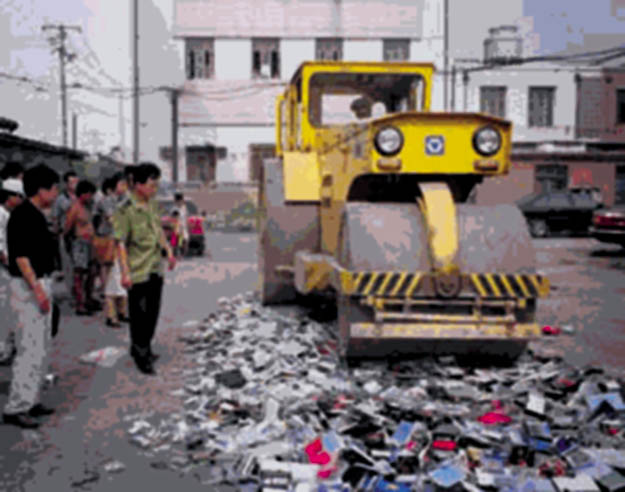
Falun Gong books are destroyed following announcement of the ban in 1999.

Beginning in July 1999 Chinese authorities issued a number of notices and circulars prescribing measures to crack down on the Falun Gong and placing restrictions on the practice and expression of religious belief:

- On 22 July 1999, the Ministry of Civil Affairs issued a circular proclaiming that the Falun Dafa Research Society was an unregistered (and therefore illegal) organization.
- On 22 July 1999 the Ministry of Public Security released a circular forbidding the practice or propagation of Falun Gong, as well as prohibiting any attempts to petition against the ban or oppose the government's decision.
- In July 1999 the Ministry of Personnel issued a circular stating that all government employees were prohibited from practising Falun Gong. Subsequent documents instructed local government departments to "deal with civil servants who have practiced Falun Gong."
- On 26 July 1999 the Ministry of Public Security called for the confiscation and destruction of all publications related to Falun Gong. Millions of Falun Gong books were shredded, burned and bulldozed.
- On 29 July 1999 the Beijing Judicial Bureau issued a notice forbidding lawyers from defending Falun Gong practitioners. The Ministry of Justice also issued instructions that lawyers were not to represent Falun Gong without permission.
- On 30 October 1999 the National People's Congress amended a statute (article 300 of the Criminal Code) to suppress "heterodox religions" across China. The legislation was used to retroactively legitimize the persecution of spiritual groups deemed "dangerous to the state". It prohibited any large-scale public assemblies, and also prohibited religious or qigong organizations from organizing themselves across multiple provinces or coordinating with groups overseas. The NPC decision stated "all corners of society shall be mobilized in preventing and fighting heretical organizations activities, and a comprehensive management system shall be put in place." The same day, the Supreme People's Court issued a judicial interpretation prescribing measures to punish individuals found in defiance of the law.
- On 5 November 1999 the Supreme People's Court issued a notice giving instructions to local courts on handling cases of people charged with crimes for "organising or using heretical organisations, particularly Falun Gong." It called for Falun Gong practitioners to be prosecuted for such offenses as "instigating activities of splitting China, endangering national unity or subverting the socialist system."

Human rights experts and legal observers have stated that the official directives and legal documents issued for the purge fall short of international legal standards and violate provisions in China's own constitution.

=== Implications for the rule of law ===
The Ministry of Justice required that lawyers seek permission before taking on Falun Gong cases, and called on them to "interpret the law in such a way as to conform to the spirit of the government's decrees." Additionally, on 5 November 1999 the Supreme People's Court issued a notice to all lower courts stating that it was their "political duty" to "resolutely impose severe punishment" against groups considered heretical, especially Falun Gong. It also required the courts at all levels to handle Falun Gong cases by following the direction of the CCP committees, thereby ensuring that Falun Gong cases would be judged based on political considerations, rather than evidence. Brian Edelman and James Richardson wrote that the SPC notice "does not comport well with a defendant's constitutional right to a defense, and it appears to assume guilt before a trial has taken place."

The CCP's campaign against Falun Gong was a turning point in the development of China's legal system, representing a "significant backward step" in the development of rule of law, according to Ian Dominson. In the 1990s the legal system was gradually becoming more professionalized, and a series of reforms in 1996–97 affirmed the principle that all punishments must be based on the rule of law. However, the campaign against Falun Gong would not have been possible if carried out within the narrow confines of China's existing criminal law. In order to persecute the group, in 1999 the judicial system reverted to being used as a political instrument, with laws being applied flexibly to advance the CCP's policy objectives. Edelman and Richardson write that "the Party and government's response to the Falun Gong movement violates citizens' right to a legal defense, freedom of religion, speech and assembly enshrined in the Constitution... the Party will do whatever is necessary to crush any perceived threat to its supreme control. This represents a move away from the rule of law and toward this historical Mao policy of 'rule by man.'"

== Propaganda ==
=== Onset of the campaign ===
This poster reads "Firmly support the decision of the Central Committee to deal with the illegal organization of Falun Gong".

One of the key elements of the anti–Falun Gong campaign was a propaganda campaign that sought to discredit and demonize Falun Gong and its teachings.

Within the first month of the crackdown, 300–400 articles attacking Falun Gong appeared in the main state-run papers, while primetime television replayed alleged exposés on the group, with no divergent views aired in the media. The propaganda campaign focused on allegations that Falun Gong jeopardized social stability, was deceiving and dangerous, was "anti-science" and threatened progress, and argued that Falun Gong's moral philosophy was incompatible with a Marxist social ethic.

For several months China Central Television's evening news contained little but anti–Falun Gong rhetoric. China scholars Daniel Wright and Joseph Fewsmith described it as "a study in all-out demonization", they wrote. Falun Gong was compared to "a rat crossing the street that everyone shouts out to squash" by Beijing Daily; other officials said it would be a "long-term, complex and serious" struggle to "eradicate" Falun Gong.

State propaganda initially used the appeal of scientific rationalism to argue that Falun Gong's worldview was in "complete opposition to science" and communism. For example, the People's Daily newspaper asserted on 27 July 1999 that the fight against Falun Gong "was a struggle between theism and atheism, superstition and science, idealism and materialism." Other editorials declared that Falun Gong's "idealism and theism" are "absolutely contradictory to the fundamental theories and principles of Marxism," and that the "'truth, kindness and forbearance' principle preached by [Falun Gong] has nothing in common with the socialist ethical and cultural progress we are striving to achieve." Suppressing Falun Gong was presented as a necessary step to maintaining the "vanguard role" of the Communist Party in Chinese society.

At the early stages of the crackdown, the evening news also would broadcast images of large piles of Falun Gong materials being crushed or incinerated. By 30 July, ten days into the campaign, Xinhua had reported confiscations of over one million Falun Gong books and other materials, hundreds of thousands burned and destroyed.

The tenor of the official rhetoric against Falun Gong continued to escalate in the months following July 1999, and broadened to include charges that Falun Gong was colluding with foreign "anti-China" forces. Media reports portrayed Falun Gong as a harm to society, an "abnormal" religious activity, and a dangerous form of "superstition" that led to madness, death, and suicide. These messages were relayed through all state-run—and many non-state-run media channels—as well as through work units and the Communist Party's own structure of cells that penetrate society.

Elizabeth Perry, a Harvard historian, writes that the basic pattern of the offensive was similar to "the anti-rightist campaign of the 1950s [and] the anti-spiritual pollution campaigns of the 1980s." As it did during the Cultural Revolution, the Communist Party organised rallies in the streets and stop-work meetings in remote western provinces by government agencies such as the weather bureau to denounce the practice. Local government authorities have carried out "study and education" programmes throughout China, and official cadres have visited villagers and farmers at home to explain "in simple terms the harm of Falun Gong to them".

=== Use of the 'cult' label ===
Despite CCP efforts, initial charges leveled against Falun Gong failed to elicit widespread popular support for the persecution of the group. In October 1999, three months after the persecution began, the Supreme People's Court issued a judicial interpretation classifying Falun Gong as a xiejiao. A broad translation of that term is "heretical teaching" or "heterodox teaching", but during the anti–Falun Gong propaganda campaign it was rendered as "cult" or "evil cult" in English. In the context of imperial China, the term "xiejiao" was used to refer to non-Confucian religions, though in the context of Communist China, it has been used to target religious organizations that do not submit to the authority of the Communist Party. Julia Ching writes that the "evil cult" label was defined by an atheist government "on political premises, not by any religious authority", and was used by the authorities to make previous arrests and imprisonments constitutional.

Ian Johnson argued that by applying the 'cult' label, the government put Falun Gong on the defensive, and "cloaked [its] crackdown with the legitimacy of the West's anticult movement." David Ownby similarly wrote that "the entire issue of the supposed cultic nature of Falun Gong was a red herring from the beginning, cleverly exploited by the Chinese state to blunt the appeal of Falun Gong.". According to John Powers and Meg Y. M. Lee, because the Falun Gong was categorized in the popular perception as an "apolitical, qigong exercise club", it was not seen as a threat to the government. The most critical strategy in the Falun Gong persecution campaign, therefore, was to convince people to reclassify the Falun Gong into a number of "negatively charged religious labels" like "evil cult", "sect", or "superstition". In this process of relabelling, the government was attempting to tap into a "deep reservoir of negative feelings related to the historical role of quasi-religious cults as a destabilising force in Chinese political history." The delegitimization was structurally enabled by the Chinese Community Party's monopoly over the definition of religion. The government only recognizes religions governed by a state controlled "Patriotic Religious Association" that enforced the party's ideology. While Falun Gong was falling outside this association, leaving them vulnerable to the government's reclassification of "cult" to delegitimize them.

Overseas Chinese propaganda using this label has been censured by Western governments. The Canadian Radio-television Telecommunications Commission in 2006 took issue with anti–Falun Gong broadcasts from Chinese Central Television (CCTV), noting "they are expressions of extreme ill will against Falun Gong and its founder, Li Hongzhi. The derision, hostility and abuse encouraged by such comments could expose the targeted group or individual to hatred or contempt and... could incite violence and threaten the physical security of Falun Gong practitioners."

=== Tiananmen Square self-immolation incident ===
A turning point in the government's campaign against Falun Gong occurred on 23 January 2001, when five people set themselves on fire in Tiananmen Square. Chinese government sources declared immediately they were Falun Gong practitioners driven to suicide by the practice, and filled the nation's media outlets with graphic images and fresh denunciations of the practice. The self-immolation was held up as evidence of the "dangers" of Falun Gong, and was used to legitimize the government's crackdown against the group.

Falun Gong sources disputed the accuracy of the government's narrative, noting that their teachings explicitly forbid violence or suicide. Several Western journalists and scholars also noted inconsistencies in the official account of events, leading many to believe the self-immolation may have been staged to discredit Falun Gong. The government did not permit independent investigations and denied Western journalists or human rights groups access to the victims. However, two weeks after the self-immolation incident, The Washington Post published an investigation into the identity of two of the victims, and found that "no one ever saw [them] practice Falun Gong."

The campaign of state propaganda that followed the event eroded public sympathy for Falun Gong. As noted by Time magazine, many Chinese had previously felt that Falun Gong posed no real threat, and that the state's crackdown against it had gone too far. After the self-immolation, however, the media campaign against the group gained significant traction. Posters, leaflets and videos were produced detailing the supposed detrimental effects of Falun Gong practice, and regular anti–Falun Gong classes were scheduled in schools. CNN compared the government's propaganda initiative to past political movements such as the Korean War and the Cultural Revolution. Later, as public opinion turned against the group, the Chinese authorities began sanctioning the "systematic use of violence" to eliminate Falun Gong. In the year following the incident, the imprisonment, torture, and deaths of Falun Gong practitioners in custody increased significantly.

== Censorship ==
=== Interference with foreign correspondents ===
The Foreign Correspondents' Club of China has complained about their members being "followed, detained, interrogated and threatened" for reporting on the crackdown on Falun Gong. Foreign journalists covering a clandestine Falun Gong news conference in October 1999 were accused by the Chinese authorities of "illegal reporting". Journalists from Reuters, the New York Times, the Associated Press and a number of other organisations were interrogated by police, forced to sign confessions, and had their work and residence papers temporarily confiscated. Correspondents also complained that television satellite transmissions were interfered with while being routed through China Central Television. Amnesty International states that "a number of people have received prison sentences or long terms of administrative detention for speaking out about the repression or giving information over the Internet."

The 2002 Reporters Without Borders' report on China states that photographers and cameramen working with foreign media were prevented from working in and around Tiananmen Square where hundreds of Falun Gong practitioners had been demonstrating in recent years. It estimates that "at least 50 representatives of the international press have been arrested since July 1999, and some of them were beaten by police; several Falun Gong followers have been imprisoned for talking with foreign journalists." Ian Johnson, The Wall Street Journal correspondent in Beijing, wrote a series of articles which won him the 2001 Pulitzer Prize. Johnson left Beijing after writing his articles, stating that "the Chinese police would have made my life in Beijing impossible" after he received the Pulitzer.

Entire news organizations have not been immune to press restrictions concerning Falun Gong. In March 2001, Time Asia ran a story about Falun Gong in Hong Kong. The magazine was pulled from the shelves in mainland China, and threatened that it would never again be sold in the country. Partly as a result of the difficult reporting environment, by 2002, Western news coverage of the persecution within China had all but completely ceased, even as the number of Falun Gong deaths in custody was on the rise.

=== Internet censorship ===
Terms related to Falun Gong are among the most heavily censored topics on the Chinese Internet, and individuals found downloading or circulating information online about Falun Gong risk imprisonment. It is reported that many Falun Gong practitioners have been jailed in recent years for posting messages about the spiritual group or human rights abuses on social media, accessing banned websites, and possessing or sharing prohibited VPN technology.

Chinese authorities began filtering and blocking overseas websites as early as the mid-1990s, and in 1998 the Ministry of Public Security developed plans for the Golden Shield Project to monitor and control online communications. The campaign against Falun Gong in 1999 provided authorities with added incentive to develop more rigorous censorship and surveillance techniques. Approximately 20% of the first tranche of "sensitive words" for censorship under the Gold Shield Project were related to Falun Gong. The government also moved to criminalize various forms of online speech. China's first integrated regulation on Internet content, passed in 2000, made it illegal to disseminate information that "undermines social stability", harms the "honor and interests of the state", or that "undermines the state's policy for religions" or preaches "feudal" beliefs—a veiled reference to Falun Gong.

The same year, the Chinese government sought out Western corporations to develop surveillance and censorship tools that would let them track Falun Gong practitioners and block access to news and information on the subject. North American companies such as Cisco and Nortel marketed their services to the Chinese government by touting their efficacy in catching Falun Gong. Domestic Chinese telecommunication companies and internet service providers are similarly required by law to participate in the censorship process. China's 2017 Cybersecurity Law empowered officials to stop the transmission of contents that are perceived as "threatening the public order", which has been applied to content related to Falun Gong. Internet Service Providers in China that fails to reporting and restricting such content would face fines and criminal liability.

In addition to censoring the Internet within its borders, the Chinese government and military use cyber-warfare to attack Falun Gong websites in the United States, Australia, Canada and Europe. According to Chinese Internet researcher Ethan Gutmann, the first sustained denial of service attacks launched by China were against overseas Falun Gong websites.

In 2005, researchers from Harvard and Cambridge found that terms related to Falun Gong were the most intensively censored on the Chinese Internet. Other studies of Chinese censorship and monitoring practices produced similar conclusions. A 2012 study examining rates of censorship on Chinese social media websites found Falun Gong-related terms were among the most stringently censored. Among the top 20 terms most likely to be deleted on Chinese social media websites, three are variations on the word "Falun Gong" or "Falun Dafa".

In response to censorship of the Chinese Internet, Falun Gong practitioners in North America developed a suite of software tools such as Freegate and Ultrasurf to bypass online censorship and surveillance. These two freeware programs are capable to circumvent China's Great Firewall by routing internet traffic through proxy servers.

== Torture and extrajudicial killing ==
=== Reeducation ===
A key component of the Communist Party's campaign is the reeducation or "transformation" of Falun Gong practitioners. Transformation is described as "a process of ideological reprogramming whereby practitioners are subjected to various methods of physical and psychological coercion until they recant their belief in Falun Gong."

The transformation process usually occurs in prisons, labor camps, reeducation centers and other detention facilities. In 2001 Chinese authorities ordered that no Falun Gong practitioner was to be spared from the coercive measures used to make them renounce their faith. The most active were sent directly to labor camps, "where they are first 'broken' by beatings and other torture." Former prisoners report being told by the guards that "no measures are too excessive" to elicit renunciation statements, and practitioners who refuse to renounce Falun Gong are sometimes killed in custody.

The transformation is considered successful once the Falun Gong practitioner signs five documents: a "guarantee" to stop practicing Falun Gong; a promise to sever all ties to the practice; two self-criticism documents critiquing their own behaviour and thinking; and criticisms of Falun Gong doctrine. In order to demonstrate the sincerity of their renunciations, practitioners are made to vilify Falun Gong in front of an audience or on videotape. These recordings may then be used by state-run media as part of a propaganda effort. In some camps the newly reeducated must partake in the transformation of other practitioners—including by inflicting physical abuse on others—as proof that they have fully renounced Falun Gong's teachings.

An account of the transformation process was published by The Washington Post in 2001:

At a police station in western Beijing, Ouyang was stripped and interrogated for five hours. "If I responded incorrectly, that is if I didn't say, 'Yes,' they shocked me with the electric truncheon," he said.

Then, he was transferred to a labor camp in Beijing's western suburbs. There, the guards ordered him to stand facing a wall. If he moved, they shocked him. If he fell down from fatigue, they shocked him.

Each morning, he had five minutes to eat and relieve himself. "If I didn't make it, I went in my pants," he said. "And they shocked me for that, too."

By the sixth day, Ouyang said, he couldn't see straight from staring at plaster three inches from his face. His knees buckled, prompting more shocks and beatings. He gave in to the guards' demands.

For the next three days, Ouyang denounced [Falun Gong's] teachings, shouting into the wall. Officers continued to shock him about the body and he soiled himself regularly. Finally, on the 10th day, Ouyang's repudiation of the group was deemed sufficiently sincere.

He was taken before a group of Falun Gong inmates and rejected the group one more time as a video camera rolled. Ouyang left jail and entered the brainwashing classes. Twenty days later after debating Falun Gong for 16 hours a day, he "graduated."

"The pressure on me was and is incredible," he said. "In the past two years, I have seen the worst of what man can do. We really are the worst animals on Earth."

The transformation efforts are driven by incentives and directives issued from central Communist Party authorities via the 610 Office. Local governments and officials in charge of detention facilities are given quotas stipulating how many Falun Gong practitioners must be successfully transformed. Fulfillment of these quotas is tied to promotions and financial compensation, with "generous bonuses" going to officials who meet the targets set by the government, and possible demotions for those who do not. The central 610 Office periodically launches new transformation campaigns to revise the quotas and disseminate new methods. In 2010, it initiated a nationwide, three-year campaign to transform large numbers of Falun Gong practitioners. Documents posted on Party and local government websites refer to concrete transformation targets and set limits on acceptable rates of "relapse". A similar three-year campaign was launched in 2013.

=== Torture and abuse in custody ===
In order to reach transformation targets, the government sanctioned the systematic use of torture and violence against Falun Gong practitioners, including shocks with electric truncheons and beatings. Amnesty International writes that "detainees who do not cooperate with the 're-education' process will be subjected to methods of torture and other ill-treatment ... with increasing severity." The "soft" methods include sleep deprivation, threatening family members, and denial of access to sanitation or bathrooms. The ill-treatment escalates to beatings, 24-hour surveillance, solitary confinement, shocks with electric batons, abusive forced feedings, "rack" torture and the "tiger bench", wherein the person is bound to a board and their legs are made to bend backwards.

Since 2000, the U.N. Special Rapporteur on Torture documented 314 cases of torture in China, representing more than 1,160 individuals. Falun Gong comprised 66% of the reported torture cases. The Special Rapporteur referred to the torture allegations as "harrowing" and asked the Chinese government to "take immediate steps to protect the lives and integrity of its detainees in accordance with the Standard Minimum Rules for the Treatment of Prisoners".

Numerous forms of torture are purported to be used, including electric shocks, suspension by the arms, shackling in painful positions, sleep and food deprivation, force-feeding, and sexual abuse, with many variations on each type.

=== Extrajudicial killing ===
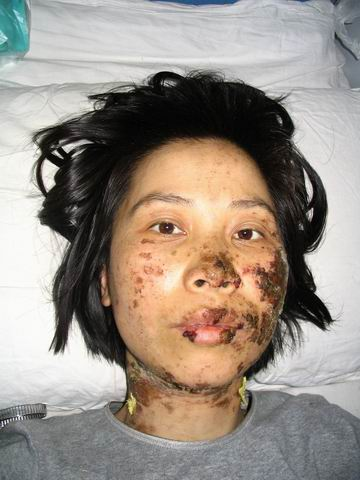
Gao Rongrong, a Falun Gong practitioner from Liaoning province, was tortured in custody in 2005.

The Falun Dafa Information Center reports that over 3,700 named Falun Gong practitioners have died as a result of torture and abuse in custody, typically after they refused to recant their beliefs. Amnesty International notes that this figure may be "only a small portion of the actual number of deaths in custody, as many families do not seek legal redress for these deaths or systematically inform overseas sources."

Among the first torture deaths reported in the Western press was that of Chen Zixiu, a retired factory worker from Shandong Province. In his Pulitzer Prize-winning article on the persecution of Falun Gong, Ian Johnson reported that labor camp guards shocked her with cattle prods in an attempt to force her to renounce Falun Gong. When she refused, "[Officials] ordered Chen to run barefoot in the snow. Two days of torture had left her legs bruised and her short black hair matted with pus and blood... She crawled outside, vomited, and collapsed. She never regained consciousness." Chen died on 21 February 2000.

On 16 June 2005, 37-year-old Gao Rongrong, an accountant from Liaoning Province, was tortured to death in custody. Two years before her death, Gao had been imprisoned at the Longshan forced labor camp, where she was badly disfigured with electric shock batons. Gao escaped the labor camp by jumping from a second-floor window, and after pictures of her burned visage were made public, she became a target for recapture by authorities. She was taken back into custody on 6 March 2005 and killed just over three months later.

On 26 January 2008, security agents in Beijing stopped popular folk musician Yu Zhou and his wife Xu Na while they were on their way home from a concert. The 42-year-old Yu Zhou was taken into custody, where authorities attempted to force him to renounce Falun Gong. He was tortured to death within 11 days.

Government authorities deny that Falun Gong practitioners are killed in custody. They attribute deaths to suicide, illness, or other accidents.

=== Forced organ harvesting ===
In 2006, allegations emerged that many Falun Gong practitioners had been killed to supply China's organ transplant industry. These allegations prompted an investigation by former Canadian Secretary of State David Kilgour and human rights lawyer David Matas. In July 2006, the Kilgour-Matas report found that "the source of 41,500 transplants for the six-year period 2000 to 2005 is unexplained" and concluded that "the government of China and its agencies in numerous parts of the country, in particular hospitals but also detention centres and 'people's courts', since 1999 have put to death a large but unknown number of Falun Gong prisoners of conscience".

The Kilgour-Matas report called attention to the extremely short wait times for organs in China—one to two weeks for a liver compared with 32.5 months in Canada—indicating that organs were being procured on demand. A significant increase in the number of annual organ transplants in China beginning in 1999, corresponded with the onset of the persecution of Falun Gong. Despite very low levels of voluntary organ donation, China performs the second-highest number of transplants per year. Kilgour and Matas also presented incriminating material from Chinese transplant center web sites advertising the immediate availability of organs from living donors, as well as transcripts of telephone interviews in which hospitals told prospective transplant recipients that they could obtain Falun Gong organs. An updated version of their report was published as a book in 2009. Kilgour followed up on this investigation in a 680-page 2016 report.

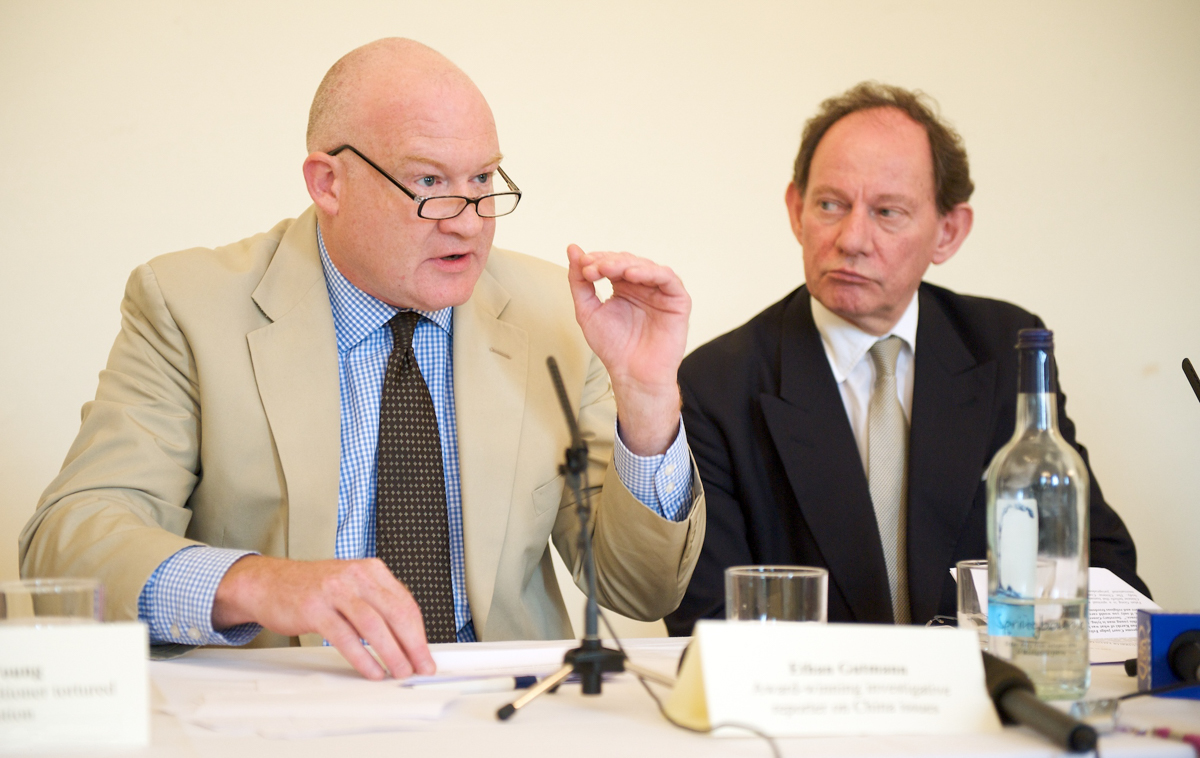
Ethan Gutmann (left) with Edward McMillan-Scott at a 2009 Foreign Press Association press conference

In 2014, investigative journalist Ethan Gutmann published the results of his own investigation. Gutmann conducted extensive interviews with former detainees in Chinese labor camps and prisons, as well as former security officers and medical professionals with knowledge of China's transplant practices. He reported that organ harvesting from political prisoners likely began in Xinjiang Uyghur Autonomous Region in the 1990s, and then spread nationwide. Gutmann estimates that some 64,000 Falun Gong prisoners may have been killed for their organs between the years 2000 and 2008.

In 2016, the researchers published a joint update to their findings showing that the number of organ transplants conducted in China is much higher than previously believed, and that the death from illicit organ harvesting could be as high as 1,500,000. The 789-page report is based on an analysis of records from hundreds of Chinese transplant hospitals.

In December 2005 and November 2006, China's Deputy Health Minister acknowledged that the practice of removing organs from executed prisoners for transplants was widespread. However, Chinese officials deny that Falun Gong practitioners' organs are being harvested, and insist that China abides by World Health Organization principles that prohibit the sale of human organs without written consent from donors.

In May 2008, two United Nations Special Rapporteurs reiterated their requests for the Chinese authorities to adequately respond to the allegations, and to provide a source for the organs that would account for the sudden increase in organ transplants in China since 2000.

In June 2019, an independent tribunal sitting in London named the China Tribunal, established to inquire into forced organ harvesting from and among prisoners of conscience in China, stated that the members of the Falun Gong spiritual group continued to be murdered by China for their organs. The tribunal said it had clear evidence that forced organ harvesting has been taking place in China for at least 20 years. China has repeatedly denied the accusations, claiming to have stopped using organs from executed prisoners in 2015. However, the lawyers and experts at the China Tribunal are convinced that the practice was still taking place with the imprisoned Falun Gong members "probably the principal source" of organs for forced harvesting.

In June 2021, the Special Procedures of the United Nations Human Rights Council voiced concerns over having “received credible information that detainees from ethnic, linguistic or religious minorities may be forcibly subjected to blood tests and organ examinations such as ultrasound and x-rays, without their informed consent; while other prisoners are not required to undergo such examinations.” The press release stated that UN's human rights experts “were extremely alarmed by reports of alleged ‘organ harvesting’ targeting minorities, including Falun Gong practitioners, Uyghurs, Tibetans, Muslims and Christians, in detention in China.”

== Arbitrary arrests and imprisonment ==
Foreign observers estimate that hundreds of thousands—and perhaps millions—of Falun Gong practitioners have been held extralegally in reeducation-through-labor camps, prisons, and other detention facilities.

Large-scale arrests are conducted periodically and often coincide with important anniversaries or major events. The first wave of arrests occurred on the evening of 20 July, when several thousand practitioners were taken from their homes into police custody. In November 1999—four months after the onset of the campaign—Vice Premier Li Lanqing announced that 35,000 Falun Gong practitioners had been arrested or detained. The Washington Post wrote that "the number of detained people... in the operation against Falun Gong dwarfs every political campaign in recent years in China." By April 2000 over 30,000 people had been arrested for protesting in defense of Falun Gong in Tiananmen Square. Seven hundred Falun Gong followers were arrested during a demonstration in the square on 1 January 2001.

In advance of the 2008 Olympics in Beijing over 8,000 Falun Gong practitioners were taken from their homes and workplaces in provinces across China. Two years later authorities in Shanghai detained over 100 practitioners ahead of the 2010 World Expo. Those who refused to disavow Falun Gong were subjected to torture and sent to reeducation through labor facilities.

=== Reeducation through labor ===
From 1999 to 2013, the vast majority of detained Falun Gong practitioners were held in reeducation through labor (RTL) camps—a system of administrative detention where people can be imprisoned without trial for up to four years.

The RTL system was established during the Maoist era to punish and reprogram "reactionaries" and other individuals deemed enemies of the Communist cause. In more recent years, it has been used to incarcerate petty criminals, drug addicts and prostitutes, as well as petitioners and dissidents. RTL sentences can be arbitrarily extended by police, and outside access is not permitted. Prisoners are forced to do heavy work in mines, brick manufacturing centers, agricultural fields, and many different types of factories. Physical torture, beatings, interrogations, and other human rights abuses take place in the camps, according to former prisoners and human rights organizations.

China's network of RTL centers expanded significantly after 1999 to accommodate an influx of Falun Gong detainees, and authorities used the camps to try to "transform" Falun Gong practitioners. Amnesty International reports that "The RTL system has played a key role in the anti–Falun Gong campaign, absorbing large numbers of practitioners over the years... Evidence suggests that Falun Gong constituted on average from one third to, in some cases, 100 percent of the total population of certain RTL camps."

International observers estimated that Falun Gong practitioners accounted for at least half of the total RTL population, amounting to several hundred thousand people. A 2005 report by Human Rights Watch found that Falun Gong practitioners made up the majority of the detainee population in the camps studied, and received the "longest sentences and worst treatment." "The government's campaign against the group has been so thorough that even long-time Chinese activists are afraid to say the group's name aloud."

In 2012 and early 2013, a series of news reports and exposés focused attention on human rights abuses at the Masanjia Forced Labor Camp, where approximately half of the inmates were Falun Gong practitioners. The exposure helped galvanize calls to end the reeducation-through-labor system. The system is often called Laogai, the abbreviation for láodòng gǎizào (勞動改造/劳动改造), which means "reform through labor". Laogai camps were abolished in 2013.

=== "Black jails" and re-education centers ===
In addition to prisons and RTL facilities, the 610 Office created a nationwide network of extrajudicial reeducation centers to "transform the minds" of Falun Gong practitioners. The centers are run extrajudicially, and the government officially denies their existence. They are known as "black jails", "brainwashing centers", "transformation through reeducation centers", or "legal education centers". Some are temporary programs established in schools, hotels, military compounds or work units. Others are permanent facilities that operate as private jails.

If a Falun Gong practitioner refuses to be "transformed" in prison or RTL camps, they can be sent directly to transformation centers upon completion of their sentence. The Congressional-Executive Commission on China writes that the facilities "are used specifically to detain Falun Gong practitioners who have completed terms in reeducation through labor (RTL) camps but whom authorities refuse to release." Practitioners who are involuntarily detained in the transformation centers must pay tuition fees amounting to hundreds of dollars. The fees are extorted from family members as well as from practitioners' work units and employers.

The government's use of "brainwashing sessions" began in 1999, but the network of transformation centers expanded nationwide in January 2001 when the central 610 Office mandated that all government bodies, work units, and corporations use them. The Washington Post reported "neighborhood officials have compelled even the elderly, people with disabilities and the ill to attend the classes. Universities have sent staff to find students who had dropped out or been expelled for practicing Falun Gong, and brought them back for the sessions. Other members have been forced to leave sick relatives" to attend the reeducation sessions. After the closure of the RTL system in 2013, authorities leaned more heavily on the transformation centers to detain Falun Gong practitioners. After the Nanchong RTL center in Sichuan province was closed, for example, at least a dozen of the Falun Gong practitioners detained there were sent directly to a local transformation center. Some former RTL camps have simply been renamed and converted into transformation centers.

=== Psychiatric abuse ===
Falun Gong practitioners who refuse to recant their beliefs are sometimes sent involuntarily to psychiatric hospitals, where they may be subject to beatings, sleep deprivation, torture by electrocution, and injections with sedatives or anti-psychotic drugs. Some are sent to the hospitals (known as ankang facilities) because their prison or RTL sentences have expired and they had not yet been successfully "transformed" in the brainwashing classes. Others were told that they were admitted because they had a "political problem"—that is, because they appealed to the government to lift the ban of Falun Gong.

Robin Munro, former director of the Hong Kong Office of Human Rights Watch and now deputy director with China Labour Bulletin, drew attention to the abuses of forensic psychiatry in China in general, and of Falun Gong practitioners in particular. In 2001, Munro alleged that forensic psychiatrists in China have been active since the days of Mao Zedong, and have been involved in the systematic misuse of psychiatry for political purposes. He says that large-scale psychiatric abuses are the most distinctive aspect of the government's protracted campaign to "crush the Falun Gong", and he found a very sizable increase in Falun Gong admissions to mental hospitals since the onset of the government's persecution campaign.

Munro claimed that detained Falun Gong practitioners are tortured and subject to electroconvulsive therapy, painful forms of electrical acupuncture treatment, prolonged deprivation of light, food and water, and restricted access to toilet facilities in order to force "confessions" or "renunciations" as a condition of release. Fines of several thousand yuan may follow. Lu and Galli write that dosages of medication up to five or six times the usual level are administered through a nasogastric tube as a form of torture or punishment, and that physical torture is common, including binding tightly with ropes in very painful positions. This treatment may result in chemical toxicity, migraines, extreme weakness, protrusion of the tongue, rigidity, loss of consciousness, vomiting, nausea, seizures and loss of memory.

Dr. Alan Stone, a professor of law and psychiatry at Harvard, found that a significant number of the Falun Gong practitioners held in psychiatric hospitals had been sent there from labor camps, writing "[They] may well have been tortured and then dumped in psychiatric hospitals as an expedient disposition." He agreed that Falun Gong practitioners sent to psychiatric hospitals had been "misdiagnosed and mistreated", but did not find definitive evidence that the use of psychiatric facilities was part of a uniform government policy, noting instead that patterns of institutionalization varied from province to province.

=== Prisons ===
Since 1999, several thousand Falun Gong practitioners have been sentenced to prisons through the criminal justice system. Most of the charges against Falun Gong practitioners are for political offenses such as "disturbing social order", "leaking state secrets", "subverting the socialist system", or "using a heretical organization to undermine the implementation of the law"—a vaguely worded provision used to prosecute, for instance, individuals who used the Internet to disseminate information about Falun Gong.

According to a report by Amnesty International, trials against Falun Gong practitioners are "Grossly unfair—the judicial process was biased against the defendants at the outset and the trials were a mere formality... None of the accusations against the defendants relate to activities which would legitimately be regarded as crimes under international standards."

Chinese human rights lawyers who have attempted to defend Falun Gong clients have faced varying degrees of persecution themselves, including disbarment, detention, and in some cases, torture and disappearance.

== Societal discrimination ==
Since July 1999, civil servants and Communist Party members have been forbidden from practicing Falun Gong. Workplaces and schools were enjoined to participate in the struggle against Falun Gong by pressuring recalcitrant Falun Gong believers to renounce their beliefs, sometimes sending them to special reeducation classes to be "transformed". Failure to do so has results in lost wages, pensions, expulsion, or termination from jobs.

Writing in 2015, Noakes and Ford noted that "Post-secondary institutions across the country—from agricultural universities to law schools to fine arts programmes—require students to prove that they have adopted the 'correct attitude' on Falun Gong as a condition of admission." For example, students at many universities are required to obtain a certificate from the public security ministry certifying that they have no affiliation with Falun Gong. The same is true in employment, with job postings frequently specifying that prospective candidates must have no record of participation in Falun Gong. In some cases, even changing one's address requires proving the correct political attitude toward Falun Gong.

== Outside China ==
The Communist Party's campaign against Falun Gong has extended to Chinese diaspora communities, including through the use of media, espionage and monitoring of Falun Gong practitioners, harassment and violence against practitioners, diplomatic pressure applied to foreign governments, and hacking of overseas websites. According to a defector from the Chinese consulate in Sydney, Australia, "The war against Falun Gong is one of the main tasks of the Chinese mission overseas."

In 2004 the U.S. House of Representatives unanimously passed a resolution condemning the attacks on Falun Gong practitioners in the United States by agents of the Communist Party. The resolution reported that party affiliates have "pressured local elected officials in the United States to refuse or withdraw support for the Falun Gong spiritual group," that Falun Gong spokespeople have had their houses broken into, and individuals engaged in peaceful protest actions outside embassies and consulates have been physically assaulted.

The overseas campaign against Falun Gong is described in documents issued by China's Overseas Chinese Affairs Office (OCAO). In a report from a 2007 meeting of OCAO directors at the national, provincial, and municipal level, the office stated that it "coordinates the launching of anti-'Falun Gong' struggles overseas." OCAO exhorts overseas Chinese citizens to participate in "resolutely implementing and executing the Party line, the Party's guiding principles, and the Party's policies," and to "aggressively expand the struggle" against Falun Gong, ethnic separatists, and Taiwanese independence activists abroad. Other party and state organizations believed to be involved in the overseas campaign include the Ministry of State Security, the 610 Office and the People's Liberation Army, among others.

Falun Gong has been banned in Russia since 2020, after a court in Khakassia deemed it an "extremist organization", and extending the ban to the entire Russian Federation. Earlier that year, several Falun Gong-related organizations were designated as 'undesirable' in Russia.

According to The Diplomat, Xi Jinping reportedly directed CCP officials in 2022 to intensify efforts to "completely, and on an international scale, suppress Falun Gong's momentum" by shaping global public opinion and using legal warfare against Falun Gong organizations abroad, including in the United States.

In 2023, John Chen and Lin Feng, two unregistered PRC agents, were indicted for bribing an IRS official to manipulate the IRS whistleblower program against Shen Yun Performing Arts in order to strip its tax-exempt status. Both were sentenced in 2024. In November 2024, Ping Li, a 59-year-old Florida resident, was sentenced to four years in prison for acting as an unregistered PRC agent. Li provided China's Ministry of State Security with corporate information about his former employers and personal details about a Florida resident affiliated with the Falun Gong religious movement.

== International response ==
The persecution of Falun Gong has attracted a large amount of international attention from governments and non-government organizations. Human rights organizations, such as Amnesty International and Human Rights Watch, have raised acute concerns over reports of torture and ill-treatment of practitioners in China and have also urged the UN and international governments to intervene to bring an end to the persecution.

The United States Congress has passed multiple resolutions calling for an immediate end to the campaign against Falun Gong practitioners both in China and abroad.

At a rally on 12 July 2012, U.S. Rep. Ileana Ros-Lehtinen (R-FL), Chairman of the House Committee on Foreign Affairs, called on the Obama administration to confront the Chinese leadership on its human rights record, including its oppression of Falun Gong practitioners. "It is essential that friends and supporters of democracy and human rights continue to show their solidarity and support, by speaking out against these abuses", she said.

In 2012, Professor of Bioethics Arthur Caplan stated:

Look, I think you can make the connections that... they are using prisoners, and they need prisoners who are relatively healthy, they need prisoners who are relatively younger. It doesn't take a great stretch of the imagination that some Falun Gong [practitioners] are going to be among those who are going to be killed for parts. It just follows, because remember you can't take very old people as sources of organs and you can't take people who are very sick. They, Falun Gong, are in part younger, and by lifestyle, healthier. I would be astounded if they weren't using some of those prisoners as sources of organs.

In 2008 Israel passed a law banning the sale and brokerage of organs. The law also ended funding, through the health insurance system, of transplants in China for Israeli nationals.

== Response from Falun Gong practitioners ==
Falun Gong's response to the persecution in China began in July 1999 with appeals to local, provincial, and central petitioning offices in Beijing. It soon progressed to larger demonstrations, with hundreds of Falun Gong practitioners traveling daily to Tiananmen Square to perform Falun Gong exercises or raise banners in defense of the practice. These demonstrations were invariably broken up by security forces, and the practitioners involved were arrested—sometimes violently—and detained. By 25 April 2000, a total of more than 30,000 practitioners had been arrested on the square; seven hundred Falun Gong followers were arrested during a demonstration in the square on 1 January 2001. Public protests continued well into 2001. Writing for The Wall Street Journal, Ian Johnson wrote that "Falun Gong faithful have mustered what is arguably the most sustained challenge to authority in 50 years of Communist rule."

By late 2001, demonstrations in Tiananmen Square had become less frequent, and the practice was driven deeper underground. As public protest fell out of favor, practitioners established underground "material sites", which would produce literature and DVDs to counter the portrayal of Falun Gong in the official media. Practitioners then distribute these materials, often door-to-door. The production, possession, or distribution of these materials is frequently grounds for security agents to incarcerate or sentence Falun Gong adherents.

In 2001, Craig S. Smith reported in the New York Times that Li Hongzhi had criticized practitioners on the Falun Gong website who "cannot endure torture or even death" in defense of his cosmology. Li wrote, "Any fear is itself a barrier that prevents you from reaching consummation". Smith explains that "consummation" was in reference to a "transcendent event" that is the spiritual goal of all followers. Smith also noted that Li had spoken out against practitioners in committing suicide.

James R. Lewis argues that some of Li Hongzhi's teachings encouraged practitioners to endure or even seek persecution. Li had assured those who died or suffered injuries for their beliefs would receive instant "consummation" (enlightenment). Stephen Noakes states, "Although there is no evidence that Li ever deliberately put his followers in harm’s way, he was certainly active in encouraging resistance activities in China and abroad."

In 2002, Falun Gong activists in China tapped into television broadcasts, replacing regular state-run programming with their own content. One of the more notable instances occurred in March 2002, when Falun Gong practitioners in Changchun intercepted eight cable television networks in Jilin Province, and for nearly an hour, televised a program titled Self-Immolation or a Staged Act?. All six of the Falun Gong practitioners involved were captured over the next few months. Two were killed immediately, while the other four were all dead by 2010 as a result of injuries sustained while imprisoned.

Outside China, Falun Gong practitioners established international media organizations to gain wider exposure for their cause and challenge narratives of the Chinese state-run media. These include the Epoch Times newspaper, New Tang Dynasty Television, and Sound of Hope radio station. According to Zhao, through the Epoch Times it can be discerned how Falun Gong is building a "de facto media alliance" with China's democracy movements in exile, as demonstrated by its frequent printing of articles by prominent overseas Chinese critics of the PRC government. In 2004, the Epoch Times published "The Nine Commentaries", a collection of nine editorials which presented a critical history of Communist Party rule. This catalyzed the Tuidang movement, which encourages Chinese citizens to renounce their affiliations to the Chinese Communist Party, including ex post facto renunciations of the Communist Youth League and Young Pioneers. The Epoch Times claims that tens of millions have renounced the Communist Party as part of the movement, though these numbers have not been independently verified.

In 2007, Falun Gong practitioners in the United States formed Shen Yun Performing Arts, a dance and music company that tours internationally. Falun Gong software developers in the United States are also responsible for the creation of several popular censorship-circumvention tools employed by internet users in China.

Falun Gong Practitioners outside China have filed dozens of lawsuits against Jiang Zemin, Luo Gan, Bo Xilai, and other Chinese officials alleging genocide and crimes against humanity. According to International Advocates for Justice, Falun Gong has filed the largest number of human rights lawsuits in the 21st century and the charges are among the most severe international crimes defined by international criminal laws. as of 2006, 54 civil and criminal lawsuits were under way in 33 countries. In many instances, courts have refused to adjudicate the cases on the grounds of sovereign immunity. In late 2009, however, separate courts in Spain and Argentina indicted Jiang Zemin and Luo Gan on charges of "crimes of humanity" and genocide, and asked for their arrest—the ruling is acknowledged to be largely symbolic and unlikely to be carried out. The court in Spain also indicted Bo Xilai, Jia Qinglin and Wu Guanzheng.

Falun Gong practitioners and their supporters also filed a lawsuit in May 2011 against the technology company Cisco Systems, alleging that the company helped design and implement a surveillance system for the Chinese government to suppress Falun Gong. Cisco denied customizing their technology for this purpose.

== See also ==
- Antireligious campaigns of the Chinese Communist Party
- Human rights in China
- Religious freedom in China
- Persecution of Uyghurs in China
- Transnational repression by China
