= Liu Jing =

Liu Jing may refer to:

- Lou Jing (fl. 200 BC), Western Han advisor and noble, renamed Liu Jing by Emperor Gaozu
- Liu Jing (died 67), Eastern Han dynasty prince of Guangling, son of Emperor Guangwu
- Liu Jing (died 81), Eastern Han dynasty prince of Langya, son of Emperor Guangwu
- Liu Jing, rebel leader in the late Ming dynasty and early Qing dynasty
- Liu Jing (politician) (born 1944), Chinese politician
- Liu Jing (actor) (born 1963), Chinese actor
- Jing Liu (architect) (born 1980), Chinese-born architect

== Sportspeople ==
- Liu Jing (footballer, born 1997), Chinese footballer
- Liu Jing (footballer, born 1998), Chinese footballer
- Liu Jing (runner) (born 1971), Chinese middle-distance runner
- Liu Jing (hurdler) (born 1977), Chinese hurdler
- Liu Jing (rower) (born 1987), Chinese rower
- Liu Jing (table tennis) (born 1988), Chinese para table tennis player
- Liu Jing (speed skater) (born 1988), Chinese speed skater
- Liu Jing (swimmer) (born 1990), Chinese swimmer
