= Gao Rongrong =

Falun Gong practitioner who was allegedly tortured to death

- 高蓉蓉
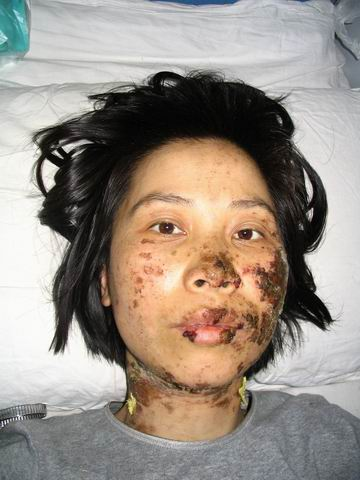
- Gao Rongrong in 2004, with her face visibly disfigured after being tortured with a stun baton.
- Born: c. 1967/68; Jilin, China
- Died: 16 June 2005 (aged 37); China
- Occupation: Accountant

Gao Rongrong (Chinese: 高蓉蓉; c. 1967/68 – 16 June 2005) was an accountant at an art college in Shenyang, China. She was dismissed in 1999 for practicing Falun Gong. Gao was reportedly sent to the Longshan Forced Labor Camp in July 2003.

Gao was allegedly tortured for six to seven hours. It was claimed that electric shock batons had been used on her face and neck. Gao tried to escape. She jumped from a second-floor window and was taken to a hospital because of multiple fractures. On 5 October 2004, Gao escaped from the hospital. She was re-apprehended by police on 6 March 2005. Gao died on 16 June 2005 while in custody. She was 37.

In 2005, Amnesty International called on the Chinese authorities to launch a full investigation into her death including allegations that she was tortured.

== See also ==
- Persecution of Falun Gong
