= Liu Qing =

Liu Qing is the name of the following Chinese people:

- Liu Qing (prince) (78–106), Han dynasty crown prince
- Liu Qing (basketball) (born 1964), basketball player
- Liu Qing (businesswoman) (born 1978), President of Didi Chuxing
- Liu Qing (footballer) (born 1986), football player
- Liu Qing (taekwondo) (born 1993), taekwondo practitioner from Macau
- Liu Qing (runner) (born 1986), middle-distance runner

== See also ==
- Liuqing of Jin, the six clans ruled by the Six Ministers in Jin state's late era
