= Central Political and Legal Affairs Commission =

Organ of the Chinese Communist Party

- 中央政法委
- Emblem of the Chinese Communist Party

Agency overview
- Formed: March 6, 1990; 36 years ago
- Preceding agency: Central Leading Group for Political and Legal Affairs
- Type: Department directly reporting to the Central Committee; Ministerial level agency
- Jurisdiction: Chinese Communist Party
- Headquarters: 14 Beichizi Street (北池子大街), Dongcheng District, Beijing
- Minister responsible: Chen Wenqing, Secretary
- Deputy Ministers responsible: Wang Xiaohong, Deputy Secretary; Yin Bai, Secretary-General
- Parent agency: Central Committee of the Chinese Communist Party
- Website: www.chinapeace.gov.cn

Central Political and Legal Affairs Commission of the Chinese Communist Party
- Simplified Chinese: 中共中央政法委员会
- Traditional Chinese: 中共中央政法委員會
- Literal meaning: Chinese-Communist Central Politics-Law Commission
Transcriptions
Standard Mandarin
- Hanyu Pinyin: Zhōnggòng Zhōngyāng Zhèngfǎ Wěiyuánhuì

Abbreviation
- Chinese: 中央政法委
- Literal meaning: Central Poli-Legal Commission
Transcriptions
Standard Mandarin
- Hanyu Pinyin: Zhōngyāng Zhèngfǎwěi

The Central Political and Legal Affairs Commission (CPLC), commonly referred to as Zhongyang Zhengfawei (Chinese: 中央政法委, literally "Central Poli-Legal Commission") in Chinese, is an organization directly under the Central Committee of the Chinese Communist Party (CCP) responsible for overseeing law enforcement, internal security, and "stability maintenance" of the political system in China.

The commission was preceded by the Politics and Law Leading Group, established in 1958. In 1980, the modern commission was established. In 1988, the commission was downgraded to a leading small group, though it was turned back to a Commission in March 1990. The organization acts as the overseer and coordinator of all legal enforcement authorities, including the Ministries of State Security, Public Security and Justice, as well as the Supreme People's Court and Supreme People's Procuratorate. All provincial, municipal, county and autonomous region CCP committees have their own political and legal affairs commissions. The commission is headed by a secretary who is usually a CCP Politburo member.

== History ==
The commission was preceded by a Politics and Law Leading Group (Chinese: 政法领导小组; Zhèngfǎ Lǐngdǎo Xiǎozǔ) which was set up in 1958, with Peng Zhen as its leader. This was followed by the establishment of Politics and Law Leading Groups at CCP committees in provinces, prefectures, and counties, with these groups being empowered to coordinate the work of law enforcement agencies. However, the group was restricted to the solving of major criminal cases or legal disputes, and had no social control and surveillance functions. During the Cultural Revolution, the group ceased to function. The group was re-established after the Cultural Revolution, with its mandate being research on major policy issues and assist the work of the Supreme People's Court, the Supreme People's Procuratorate, the Ministry of Public Security, and the Ministry of Civil Affairs.

During this time, it was led by Ji Dengkui, who served as group leader until 24 January 1980, when the commission was established, with Peng Zhen back as its secretary. In 1988, the commission was downgraded to a leading small group. This was part of the result of efforts by reformist Zhao Ziyang to separate the CCP from state institutions. The Small Leading Group on Political and Legal Affairs focused on a narrower set of policy and research concerns, and did not take as active a role intervening in cases or issuing directives, resulting in a degree of increased independence of the judiciary. The crisis precipitated by the 1989 Tiananmen Square protests and massacre resulted in a reversal of these reforms, and the Small Group was reverted to its Commission status in March 1990, with the goal of maintaining stability through tighter control of public security and legal systems.

The powers of the CPLC grew during the 1990s, leading its local branches to become the leading bodies for social control and surveillance. In 1995, the CCP General Office issued a directive stating that CPLC branches had the responsibility to "organize and coordinate the work of social comprehensive management of law and order and public safety. In 1996, the 610 Office was set up inside the CPLC. In November 2003, the CCP implemented a rule stating that a member of the standing committee of the local party committee or a deputy governor or mayor should concurrently serve as director of the local public security agency.

After the 18th National Congress of the CCP in 2012, Meng Jianzhu replaced Zhou Yongkang as the head of the commission. However, Meng, unlike Zhou, was not elected to the 18th CCP Politburo Standing Committee. The apparent downgrading of the post followed Zhou's connection with the Wang Lijun incident, which has discredited Chongqing politician Bo Xilai's method of using the internal security apparatus for political ends. Reforms under CCP general secretary Xi Jinping emphasizing simultaneous need for rule of law and stability have subsequently affected the commission. The commission now has a more policy-and-research oriented focus, although the CCP still maintains control over the legal system.

In March 2018, it was put in charge of maintaining comprehensive public security after the abolishment of the Central Committee for Comprehensive Management of Public Security and its office as part of the deepening the reform of the Party and state institutions. It also took over the responsibilities of the Central Leading Group on Dealing with Heretical Religions and its executive organ, the 610 Office, after their abolition.

In May 2021, the commission was criticized after an account belonging to it posted an image on Sina Weibo of a rocket launch in China next to a photo of mass cremations in India as a result of the COVID-19 pandemic. In 2021, it was reported that the commission operates a predictive policing system against Uyghurs and others.

In 2021, the commission implemented the Education and Rectification Campaign of the Political-Legal Organizations aimed to curb corruption and extrajudicial interventions in the court system. As part of public education for the campaign, the commission helped produce The Knockout, a 2023 TV series which dramatized the campaign and became one of the most watched series in China that year.

== Functions ==
The CPLAC coordinates the work of law enforcement, internal security, and social stability in China. It acts as the overseer and coordinator of all legal enforcement authorities, including the Ministries of State Security, Public Security and Justice, as well as the Supreme People's Court and Supreme People's Procuratorate. All provincial, municipal, county and autonomous region CCP committees have their own political and legal affairs commissions. The CPLC functions as "the general chief of staff of the party committees, and represents the party in overseeing the country's intelligence, law enforcement, judicial, and to a lesser extent, lawmaking systems". The CPLC maintains effective control over the court system and its personnel. The CPLC ensures that courts implement CCP policies and vets law enforcement officers for political reliability.

It is the "organizational linchpin of the Chinese surveillance state," according to Minxin Pei. According to Pei, the CPLC is responsible for "translating the party’s orders on domestic security into implementable policies, coordinating actions among various security agencies, supervising the work of the courts and procuratorates, and overseeing implementation of high-priority tasks, such as high-tech surveillance systems, new law-and-order initiatives". Its control of China's judicial system has been especially useful and important for the CCP since the beginning of reform and opening up, because the CPLC has acted, through judges and prosecutors, to seize the assets and imprison those businesspeople who were becoming economically powerful enough to acquire a base independent from that of the party.

== Structure ==
The Central Political and Legal Affairs Commission has the following organization:

=== Internal organization ===
- Office
- Political Department
- Research Office (Law Enforcement Supervision and Coordination Office)
- Public Security Comprehensive Management Supervision Bureau (Special Action Office)
- Political Security Bureau
- Guidance Bureau for Maintaining Social Stability
- Anti-secession Guidance and Coordination Office
- Anti-Cult Coordination Bureau
- Grassroots Social Governance Bureau
- Political and Legal Team Building Guidance Bureau
- Publicity and Education Bureau
- Law and Order Bureau
- Party Committee
- Retired Cadres Bureau

=== Directly affiliated institutions ===
- Central Political and Legal Affairs Commission Service Center
- Institute of Political Science and Law of the Central Political and Legal Commission
- Central Political and Legal Affairs Commission Political and Legal Affairs Information Center

=== Directly affiliated enterprises ===
- China Changan Publishing and Media

== Current composition ==
Secretary

- Chen Wenqing, Member of the 20th Politburo, Secretary of the Central Secretariat

Deputy Secretary

- Wang Xiaohong, State Councilor and Minister of Public Security (sub-national-leader-level)

Members

1. Chief Justice Zhang Jun, President of the Supreme People's Court (sub-national-leader-level)
2. Prosecutor General Ying Yong, Prosecutor General of the Supreme People's Procuratorate (sub-national-leader-level)
3. Yin Bai, Secretary-General of the Central Political and Legal Affairs Commission (minister-level)
4. Chen Yixin, Minister of State Security (minister-level)
5. He Rong, Minister of Justice (minister-level)

== See also ==
- State and Legal Affairs Department of the Central Committee of the SED
