= Liu Jing (politician) =

Chinese politician

Liu Jing (Chinese: 刘京; pinyin: Líu Jīng; born 1944) is a former Deputy Minister of Public Security of the People's Republic of China, and the former director of the 610 Office. He is also a high figure in two different offices of the Chinese government charged with dealing with subversive behaviors. Liu is originally from Yu County in Shanxi province. He received a degree in wireless systems and technology from the Beijing Institute of Technology.

Liu was a member of the 17th Central Committee of the Chinese Communist Party.
