= Leading Small Group =

Ad hoc body of the Chinese Communist Party

A Leading Small Group (领导小组; lǐngdǎo xiǎozǔ), also translated as a "Central Leading Group" or "Leadership Small Group," is a body of the Chinese Communist Party (CCP) charged with decision-making on major functional issue areas. LSGs operate effectively as interagency executive committees, cutting across the government, party, and military bureaucracies. Major LSGs cover issues such as national security, foreign affairs, Taiwan affairs, Hong Kong and Macao, propaganda and ideology, and financial and economic matters.

== Role ==
Leading Small Groups are one of the least institutionalized, and therefore most flexible, parts of the Chinese political system. LSGs operate effectively as interagency executive committees, cutting across the government, party, and military bureaucracies.

Leading Small Groups were first established in 1958 under a somewhat vague mandate, authorized by Chapter IX of the Constitution of the Chinese Communist Party. They fell into disuse during the Cultural Revolution but were revived under the reformist Deng Xiaoping in the 1980s.

Their role was redefined in December 1987 under a set of reforms approved by the Party's 2nd Plenum. They were categorised as decision-making consulting bodies (决策咨询机构; juece zixun jigou) of the Party's Central Committee and were usually task-oriented, short-term groups. In 1997 they were confirmed as formal parts of the system. They have become especially important during the tenure of CCP general secretary Xi Jinping. Some operate on a permanent basis, while others exist temporarily to tackle an immediate issue.

Policy implementation is coordinated through LSGs across principal decision-making bodies, including the Politburo – to which LSGs report – and the State Council, the Central Military Commission, the State Council and the Ministry of Foreign Affairs. Members of the Politburo Standing Committee normally head LSGs. China's vertically organised system of government often lacks horizontal coordination between its different parts; LSGs play an important part in overcoming this lack of horizontal coordination. Functionally, LSGs enable the Party to use its overarching authority to facilitate decision-making and compensate for the horizontally fragmented nature of China's government system.

There are two types of LSGs. Party LSGs manage policy for the Politburo and Secretariat, and State Council LSGs coordinate policy implementation for the government. The Party LSGs tend to focus on political and legal affairs, along with national security issues, while State Council LSGs focus on the economy and society. A 2017 study reported the likely existence of 83 LSGs, 26 being Party LSGs and 57 under the State Council. This is an increase in the number of rumored LSG's from 2015 where the estimate sat around 39 LSG's.

LSGs do not formulate concrete policies (政策; zhengce), but rather issue guiding principles about the general direction in which bureaucratic activity should move (方针; fangzhen). A fangzhen provides the framework for the development of zhengce. The recommendations of leading groups are likely to have considerable influence on the policymaking process because they represent the consensus of the leading members of the relevant government, party, and military agencies. In some cases, the Chinese leadership will adopt an LSG's recommendation with little or no modification.

Not only do LSG's circumvent traditional methods of policy creation within the CCP, but it spreads it out amongst multiple groups with sometimes conflicting goals who compete for influence with Xi Jinping at the top.

There are 3 possible futures for Xi's use of LSGs: return them to their original role of information coordination; utilize LSGs to strategically guide the Party and government bureaucracy, or like Xi has been doing, have LSGs take on a more permanent centralized position in the policy process. If LSGs continue to be centralized with Xi sitting on more of them, this gives Xi more power and access to every single major policy issue in China because in these LSGs, he outranks the bureaucrats at the table.

== Membership and staffing ==
LSGs bring together leading party, government and military officials to discuss issues, exchange ideas and make policy recommendations to the Politburo and its Standing Committee. Academic specialists and influential journalists may also participate in LSGs. Not all LSGs operate at ministerial level; some may operate with lower-level officials. In recent years, LSGs have provided an important vehicle for individual leaders to direct policy. They enable the top leadership to exercise direct control over the management of key policy areas. The most significant LSGs, use "Commission" in their names, for example, the National Security Commission.

The Xi Jinping era has seen the creation of a number of many new LSGs to push forward key elements of his agenda and overcome obstacles within China's bureaucracy. Under Xi, eight new Party LSGs and 21 new State Council LSGs were created shortly after he took power in 2012. Xi's personal chairing of nine LSGs – an unprecedented number – has reflected his drive to centralize power in his own hands. This has provided a means for Xi to circumvent China's collective leadership through domination of the LSGs.

Details of the current membership and even the number of existing LSGs are rarely disclosed, though some historical information about LSGs in earlier decades has been released within China. They are not included in publicly available organisation charts or descriptions of government institutions, due to their sensitivity as instruments of leadership. The flexible nature of LSGs mean that their membership and structure can be subject to considerable changes and moves within the Chinese power structure.

LSGs have no permanent staff and instead rely on their General Offices (办公室; bangongshi) to manage daily operations and for research and policy recommendations. Consequently, the effectiveness of an LSG often depends on the effectiveness of its General Office.

== See also ==
- Organization of the Chinese Communist Party
