= History of Falun Gong =

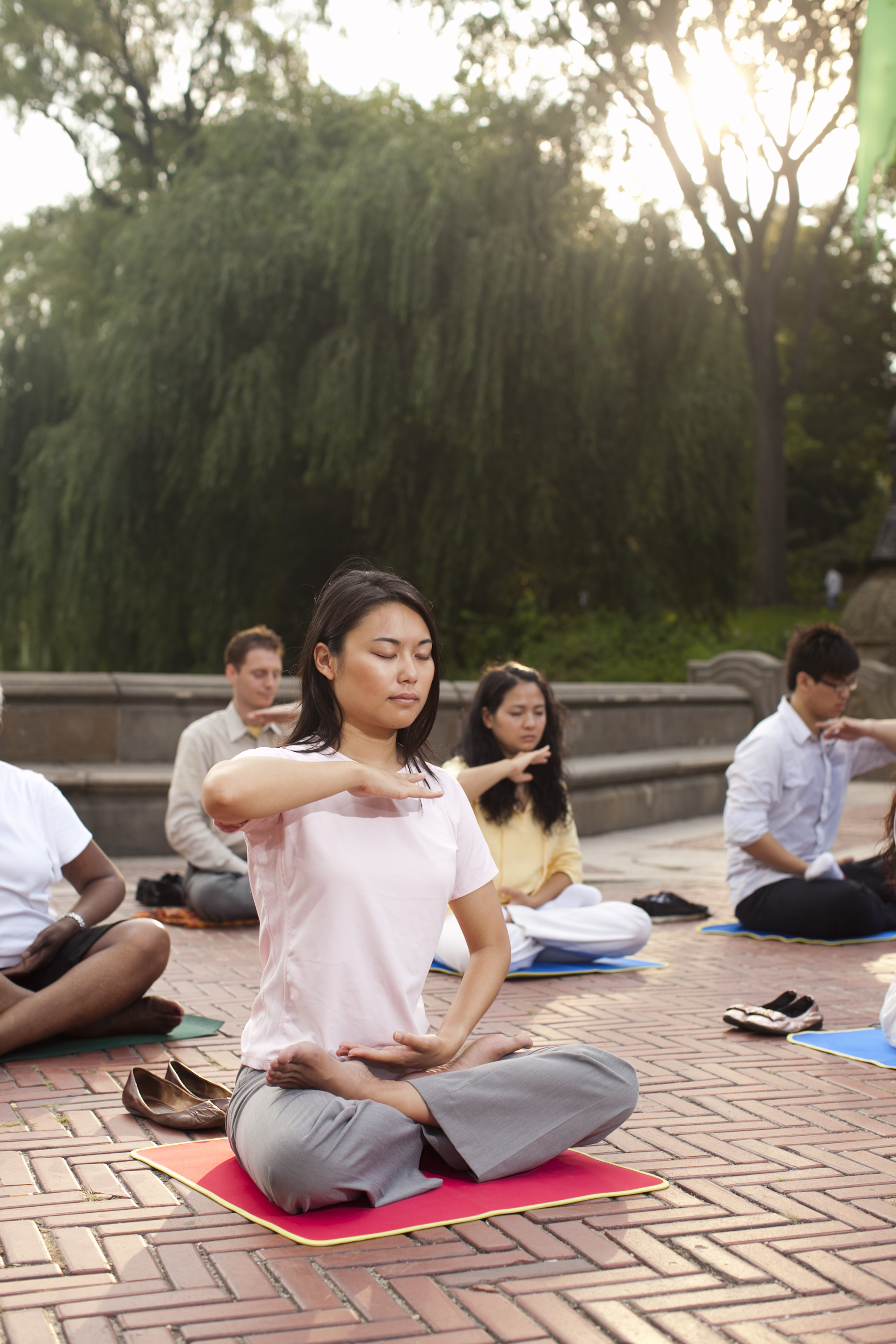
Falun Gong adherents practice the fifth exercise, a meditation, in Manhattan

Falun Gong, also called Falun Dafa, is a new religious movement centered entirely around the teachings of its founder and leader, China-born Li Hongzhi. It emerged on the public radar in the Spring of 1992 in the northeastern Chinese city of Changchun, and was classified as a system of qigong identifying with the Buddhist tradition. Li claimed to have both supernatural powers, such as the ability to prevent illness and eternal youth, and promised that others could attain supernatural powers and eternal youth by following his teachings. Falun Gong initially enjoyed official sanction and support from Chinese government agencies, and the practice grew quickly on account of the simplicity of its exercise movements, impact on health, the absence of fees or formal membership, and moral and philosophical teachings.

In the mid-1990s, however, Falun Gong became estranged from the state-run qigong associations, leading to a gradual escalation of tensions with Chinese Communist Party (CCP) authorities that culminated in the Spring of 1999. In response to media criticism of the movement, practitioners held demonstrations outside offices of newspapers and television stations. Following a protest of approximately 20,000 Falun Gong practitioners near the Zhongnanhai government compound on 25 April 1999 to request official recognition, then-CCP general secretary Jiang Zemin banned Falun Gong as a "heretical cult". A campaign of propaganda, imprisonment, and suppression followed.

Falun Gong practitioners have responded to the campaign with protests on Tiananmen Square, the creation of their own media companies overseas including The Epoch Times and New Tang Dynasty Television, international lawsuits targeting Chinese officials, and the establishment of a network of underground publishing sites to produce literature on the practice within China. Falun Gong has emerged as a prominent voice for an end to one-party rule in China. In 2024, The New York Times reported that Li had claimed that people who believe in the "goodness" of Falun Gong and reject the Chinese Communist Party would be "saved" from a coming apocalypse and enter a new dimension.

== Timeline of major events ==
=== Before 1992 ===
Although qigong-like practices have a long history, the modern qigong movement traces its origins only to the late 1940s and 1950s. At that time, CCP cadres began pursuing qigong as a means of improving health, and regarded it as a category of traditional Chinese medicine. With official support from the party-state, qigong grew steadily in popularity, particularly in the period following the Cultural Revolution. The state-run China Qigong Scientific Research Society was established in 1985 to administer and oversee qigong practice across the country. Thousands of qigong disciplines emerged, some of them headed by "grandmasters" with millions of adherents.

From his youth, Li Hongzhi claims to have been tutored by a variety of Buddhist and Daoist masters, who, according to his spiritual biography, imparted to him the practice methods and moral philosophy that would come to be known as Falun Gong.

- 7 July 1952 – Founder Li Hongzhi is born.
- 1955 – According to his spiritual biography, Li begins learning under the tutelage of master Quan Je, a tenth-generation master of Buddhist cultivation who imparts to Li the principles of Zhen, Shan, Ren (truth, compassion, forbearance). The instruction lasts eight years.
- 1963 – According to his spiritual biography, Daoist master Baji Zhenren begins training Li in Daoist martial arts disciplines and physical skills training.
- 1970 – Li begins working at a military horse farm in northeast China, and in 1972 works as a trumpet player with a division of the provincial forestry police.
- 1972 – Li continues his spiritual training under the instruction of a master Zhen Daozhi, who imparts methods of internal cultivation. According to Li's spiritual biography, his training in this period mostly took place under the cover of night, possibly due to the political environment of the Cultural Revolution.
- 1974 – Li's biography states that he begins studying the instruction of a female Buddhist master. Throughout the next several years, Li continued his studies and observations of spiritual cultivation systems.
- Early 1980s – Having had his middle and high school education interrupted by the Cultural Revolution, Li completes his high school education via correspondence courses.
- 1984 – According to his spiritual biography, Li creates Falun Gong with his masters as a more accessible version of Falun Fofa, based on other qigong.
- Mid-1980s – Li begins studying and observing a variety of other qigong disciplines, apparently in preparation for establishing and publicizing his own qigong system.
- 1985 – Chinese authorities create a national organization to oversee the great variety of qigong disciplines that were proliferating across the country. The China Qigong Scientific Research Society was established in 1985 and convened its first meeting in Beijing in 1986. The organization counted among its leadership several eminent members and former members of the Politburo and National People's Congress, as well as former ministers of health and education.
- 1989 – Li begins private instruction of Falun Gong to select students.

=== 1992–1995 ===
Falun Gong was publicly founded in the Spring of 1992, toward the end of China's qigong fever, a period which saw the proliferation of thousands of disciplines. Li Hongzhi and his Falun Gong became an "instant star" of the qigong movement, and were welcomed into the government-administered China Qigong Scientific Research Society (CQRS). From 1992 to 1994, Li traveled throughout China giving 54 lecture seminars on the practice and beliefs of Falun Gong. Seminars typically lasted 8–10 days, and attracted as many as 6,000 participants per class. The practice grew rapidly based on its purported efficacy in improving health and its moral and philosophical elements, which were more developed than those of other qigong schools.

- 1992 – On 13 May, Li begins public teaching of Falun Gong at the No. 5 Middle School in Changchun, Jilin Province, lecturing to a crowd of several hundred. The seminar ran for nine days at a cost of 30 Yuan per person.
- 1992 – In September, Falun Gong is recognized as a qigong branch under the administration of the state-run China Qigong Scientific Research Society (CQRS).
- 1992 – Li and several Falun Gong students participate in the 1992 Asian Health Expo in Beijing from 12 to 21 December. The organizer of the health fair remarked that Falun Gong and Li "received the most praise [of any qigong school] at the fair, and achieved very good therapeutic results." The event helped cement Li's popularity in the qigong world, and journalistic reports of Falun Gong's healing powers spread.
- 1992 – By the end of the year, Li had given five week-long lecture seminars in Beijing, four in Changchun, one in Tayuan, and one in Shandong.
- 1993 – China Falun Gong (中国法轮功), the first major instructional text by Li Hongzhi, is published by Military Yiwen Press in April. The book sets forth an explanation of Falun Gong's basic cosmology, moral system, and exercises. A revised edition is released in December of the same year.
- 1993 – In the spring and summer of 1993, a series of glowing article appear in Qigong magazines nationwide lauding the benefits of Falun Gong. Several feature images of Li Hongzhi on the cover, and asserting the superiority of the Falun Gong system.
- 1993 – The Falun Xiulian Dafa Research Society is established as a branch of the CQRS on 30 July.
- 1993 – In August, an organization under Ministry of Public Security sends a letter to the CQRS thanking Li Hongzhi for providing his teachings to police officers injured in the line of duty. The letter claimed that of the 100 officers treated by Li, only one failed to experience "obvious improvement" to their health.
- 1993 – Li again participates in the Asian Health Expo in Beijing from 11 to 20 Dec, this time as a member of the organizing committee. He wins several awards at the event, and is proclaimed the "Most Acclaimed Qigong Master." Falun Gong also received the "Special Gold Award" and award for "Advancing Frontier Science."
- 1994 - Li asserts a new birth date for himself, 13 May 1951. Li asserted this date so that on the lunar calendar, his birthday would be consistent with the founder of Buddhism.
- 1994 – The Jilin Province Qigong Science Research Association proclaims Li Hongzhi a "Grandmaster of Qigong" on 6 May.
- 1994 – Li gives two lectures on Falun Gong at the Public Security University in Beijing, and contributes profits from the seminars to a foundation for injured police officers.
- 1994 – As revenues from the sale of his publications grew, Li ceased to charge fees for his classes, and thereafter insists that Falun Gong must be taught free of charge.
- 1994 – The last full seminar on Falun Gong practice and philosophy takes place from 21 to 29 December in the southern city of Guangzhou.
- 1995 – Zhuan Falun (转法轮), the complete teachings of Falun Gong, is published in January by the China Television Broadcasting Agency Publishing Company. A publication ceremony is held in the Ministry of Public Security auditorium on 4 January. With its presentation of Li's religious teachings, Zhuan Falun marked Falun Gong's transition to a new religious movement.
- 1995 – In February, Li is approached by the Chinese National Sports Committee, Ministry of Public Health, and China Qigong Science Research Association to jointly establish a Falun Gong association. Li declines the offer.
- 1995 – Official attitudes towards the Qigong movement within some segments of the government begin to change, as criticisms of qigong begin appearing in the state-run press.
- 1995 – Li leaves China and begins spreading his practice overseas.
- 1995 – At the invitation of the Chinese embassy in Paris, Li begins teaching Falun Gong abroad. On 13 March, he gives a seven-day class in Paris, followed by another lecture series in Sweden in April (Gothenburg, Stockholm and Uddevalla).
- 1995 -- The qigong field generally comes under media criticism, with media reports condemning various qigong masters for practicing pseudoscience, swindling, and quackery.

=== 1996–June 1999 ===
Having announced that he was finished teaching his practice in China, Li Hongzhi begins teaching his practice in Europe, Oceania, North America and Southeast Asia. In 1998, Li relocates permanently to the United States.

As the practice continues to grow within China, tensions emerge between Falun Gong and Chinese authorities. In 1996, Falun Gong withdraws from the China Qigong Scientific Research Society, and thereafter finds itself the subject of growing scrutiny and criticism in the state-run press. The practice becomes a subject of high-level debates within the government and the CCP, with some ministries and government authorities expressing continued support for the practice, and others becoming increasingly wary of the group. This tension also played out in the media, as some outlets continued to laud the effects of Falun Gong, while others criticized it as pseudoscience.

Tensions continue to escalate over this period, culminating in a demonstration on 25 April 1999 near the Zhongnanhai government compound, where over ten thousand Falun Gong practitioners gather to request official recognition. Following the event, Jiang Zemin, then-CCP general secretary, quietly prepares for the launch of a nationwide campaign to persecute the practice.

- 1996 – The book Zhuan Falun is listed as a bestseller by Beijing Youth Daily (北京青年报) in January, March, and April.
- 1996 – Falun Gong files for withdrawal from the China Qigong Scientific Research Society in March. Li later explains that he had found the state-run CQRS to be more concerned with profiting from qigong than engaging in genuine research. Li had also apparently rejected a new CQRS policy that mandated that all qigong practices create CCP branches within their organizations. Falun Gong is left entirely without government oversight or sanction.
- 1996 – At Li's direction, administrators of the Falun Gong Research Association of China apply for registration with three other government organizations, including the Buddhist Association of China and the United Front Work Department. All applications are ultimately denied.
- 1996 – The first major state-run media article criticizing Falun Gong appears in the Guangming Daily newspaper on 17 June. The article writes that Falun Gong represents a manifestation of feudal superstition, and that its core text, Zhuan Falun, is a work of "pseudo-science" that swindles the masses. Falun Gong practitioners responded to the article's publication with a letter-writing campaign to the newspaper and national qigong association.
- 1996 – Several Buddhist journals and magazines start to write articles criticizing Falun Gong as a "heretical sect". These articles contend that Falun Gong has appropriated, distorted, and slandered Buddhism. Lay Buddhist Chen Xingqiao writes a treatise analyzing Falun Gong within the Chinese historical tradition of popular sectarian religions like White Lotus Society.
- 1996 – On 24 July, Falun Gong books are banned from further publication by the China News Publishing Bureau, a branch of the CCP Central Propaganda Department. The reason cited for the ban is that Falun Gong is "spreading superstition." Pirated and copied versions of Falun Gong books proliferate, with Li Hongzhi's approval.
- 1996 – Li begins another international lecture tour in the summer of 1996, traveling to Hong Kong, Sydney, Bangkok, Houston, New York, and Beijing.
- 1996 – The China Qigong Scientific Research Society issues a resolution on the cancellation of Falun Gong's membership with the society. The resolution stated that although practitioners of Falun Gong had "attained unparalleled results in terms of fitness and disease prevention," Li Hongzhi "propagated theology and superstition," failed to attend association meetings, and departed from the association's procedures.
- 1997 – According to an analysis by academic David Palmer, Falun Gong has ten million followers as of 1997. Falun Gong asserts that it had 100 million followers and 20 million regular practitioners as of 1997.
- 1997 – The Ministry of Public Security launches an investigation into whether Falun Gong should be deemed xie jiao ("heretical religion"). The report concludes that "no evidence has appeared thus far."
- 1997–1999 – Criticism of Falun Gong escalates in state-run media. With the encouragement of Li, Falun Gong practitioners respond to criticisms by peacefully petitioning outside media offices seeking redress against perceived unfair reporting. The tactic succeeds frequently, often resulting in the retraction of critical articles and apologies from the news organizations. Not all media coverage was negative in this period, however, and articles continued to appear highlighting Falun Gong's health benefits.
- 1998 - On 13 January, the China Buddhist Association held a meeting on how to react to Falun Gong.
- 1998 – On 21 July, the Ministry of Public Security issues Document No. 555, "Notice of the Investigation of Falun Gong." The document asserts that Falun Gong is an "evil religion," and mandates that another investigation be launched to seek evidence of the conclusion. The faction hostile toward Falun Gong within the ministry was reportedly led by Luo Gan. Security agencies began monitoring and collecting personal information on practitioners; Falun Gong sources reported authorities were tapping phone lines, harassing and tailing practitioners, ransacking homes, and closing down Falun Gong meditation sessions.
- 1998 – According to Falun Gong sources, Qiao Shi, the former Chairman of the National People's Congress, leads his own investigation into Falun Gong and concluded that "Falun Gong has hundreds of benefits for the Chinese people and China, and does not have one single bad effect."
- 1998 – China's National Sports Commission launches its own investigation in May, and commissions medical professionals to conduct interviews of over 12,000 Falun Gong practitioners in Guangdong province. 97.9 percent of respondents say Falun Gong improved their health.
- 1998 – Estimates provided by the State Sports Commission suggest there are upwards of 60 to 70 million Falun Gong practitioners in China.
- 1999 – Li Hongzhi continues to teach Falun Gong internationally, with occasional stops in China. By early 1999, Li had lectured in Sydney, Bangkok, San Francisco, Los Angeles, Hong Kong, Taipei, Frankfurt, Toronto, Singapore, Geneva, Houston and New York, as well as in Changchun and Beijing.
- 1999 – Wu Shaozu, an official from China's National Sports Commission, says in an interview with U.S. News & World Report on 14 February that as many as 100 million may have taken up Falun Gong and other forms of qigong. Wu notes that the popularity of Falun Gong dramatically reduces health care costs, and "Premier Zhu Rongji is very happy about that."
- 1999 – In April, physicist He Zuoxiu from the Chinese Academy of Sciences publishes an article in Tianjin Normal University's Youth Reader magazine criticizing Falun Gong as superstitious and potentially harmful for youth and stating that he knew someone who died because of it. At that time, some countries near China had people practicing, like Vietnam.
- 1999 – Tianjin Falun Gong practitioners respond to the article by peacefully petitioning in front of the editorial offices. Editors initially agree to publish a retraction of the He Zuoxiu article, then renege.
- 1999 – On 23 April, some 300 security forces are called in to break up an ongoing Falun Gong demonstration. Forty-five Falun Gong practitioners are beaten and detained.
- 1999 – Falun Gong practitioners petition Tianjin City Hall for the release of the detained practitioners. They are reportedly told that the order to break up the crowd and detain protesters came from central authorities in Beijing, and that further appeals should be directed at Beijing.

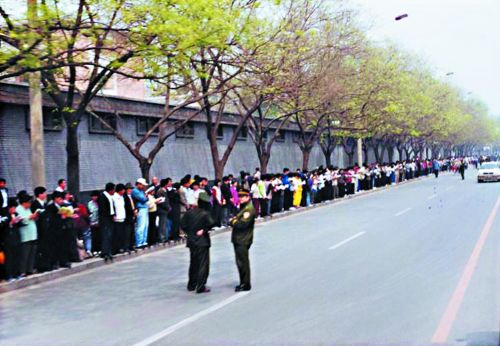
Falun Gong practitioners demonstrate outside the Zhongnanhai government compound in April 1999 to request official recognition.

- 1999 – On 25 April 10,000–20,000 Falun Gong practitioners quietly assemble outside the Central Appeals Office, adjacent to the Zhongnanhai leadership compound in Beijing. Five Falun Gong representatives meet with Premier Zhu Rongji to request official recognition and an end to escalating harassment against the group. Zhu agrees to release the Tianjin practitioners, and assures the representatives that the government does not oppose Falun Gong. The same day, however, at the urging of Luo Gan, CCP general secretary Jiang Zemin issues a letter stating his intention to suppress the practice.
- 1999 – On 26 April, Jiang Zemin convenes a meeting of the Politburo Standing Committee to discuss the Falun Gong demonstration. Some Politburo members reportedly favored a conciliatory position towards Falun Gong, while others – such as Jiang and security czar Luo Gan – favored a decisive suppression of the group.
- 1999 – Authorities increased surveillance on Falun Gong, tapping telephones of practitioners and monitoring practitioners in several cities.
- 1999 – On 2 May, Li Hongzhi gives a press conference to journalists in Sydney, Australia. When asked by a reporter whether he believed the government would kill or imprison his disciples to maintain social order, Li responded that "[Falun Gong] practitioners will never go against the law. In terms of the scenario you describe, I don't think it will happen.[...] since the economic reform and opening up, the Chinese government has been quite tolerant in this respect."
- 1999 – In May and June, just as preparations are quietly underway for a crackdown, Falun Gong practitioners continue their public meditation sessions. The Far Eastern Economic Review wrote "in a park in western Beijing, 100 or so Falun Gong practitioners exercised under a bold yellow banner proclaiming their affiliation...[they are] far from running scared."
- 1999 – On 2 June, Li purchases space in several Hong Kong newspapers to publish an article defending Falun Gong, and urging Chinese leaders not to "risk universal condemnation" and "waste manpower and capital" by antagonizing the group.
- 1999 – On 3 June, 70,000 practitioners from Jilin and Liaoning travel to Beijing in an attempt to appeal to authorities. They were intercepted by security forces, sent home, and placed under surveillance.
- 1999 – On 7 June 1999, Jiang Zemin convened a meeting of the Politburo to address the Falun Gong issue. In the meeting, Jiang described Falun Gong as a grave threat to CCP authority – "something unprecedented in the country since its founding 50 years ago" – and ordered the creation of a special leading group within the party's Central Committee to "get fully prepared for the work of disintegrating [Falun Gong]."
- 1999 – On 10 June, the 610 Office was formed to handle day-to-day coordination of the anti-Falun Gong campaign. Luo Gan was selected to helm the office, whose mission at the time was described as studying, investigating, and developing a "unified approach...to resolve the Falun Gong problem." The office was not created with any legislation, and there are no provisions describing its precise mandate. The 610 Office came under the newly created Central Leading Group for Dealing with Falun Gong, headed by Li Lanqing. Both Li and Luo were members of the Politburo Standing Committee, and the four other deputy directors of the Central Leading Group also held high-level positions in the CCP, including minister of the propaganda department. The 610 Office identified, surveilled, punished, and sought to "re-educate" Falun Gong practitioners.
- 1999 –On 17 June, Jiang Zemin declared in a Politburo meeting that Falun Gong is the most serious political incident since the 1989 student protests.
- 1999 – On 26 June, thirteen Falun Gong exercise sites in public parks are shut down by Beijing security officials.

=== July 1999–2001 ===
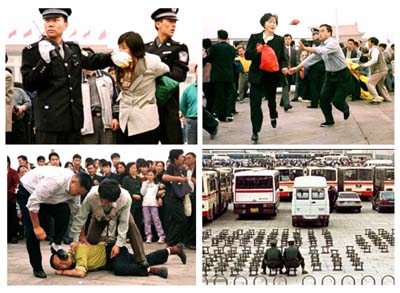
Falun Gong practitioners being arrested in Tiananmen Square following the ban

In July 1999, a nationwide campaign is rolled out to "eradicate" Falun Gong. The persecution campaign is characterized by a "massive propaganda campaign" against the group, public burnings of Falun Gong books, and imprisonment of tens of thousands of Falun Gong practitioners in prisons, reeducation through labor camps, psychiatric hospitals and other detention facilities. Authorities are given the broad mandate of 'transforming' practitioners, resulting in the widespread use of torture against Falun Gong practitioners, sometimes resulting in death.

From late 1999 to early 2001, hundreds of Falun Gong practitioners per day travel to Tiananmen Square to stage peaceful protests against the persecution. The protests take the form of performing Falun Gong exercises or meditation, or holding banner proclaiming Falun Gong's innocence. The protests are broken up, often violently, by security forces.

- 1999 – During a 19 July meeting of senior CCP cadres, Jiang Zemin's decision to eradicate Falun Gong was announced. The campaign was originally intended to have begun on 21 July, but as the document was apparently leaked, the crackdown started on 20 July. A nationwide propaganda campaign is launched to discredit Falun Gong.
- 1999 – Just after midnight on 20 July, Falun Gong practitioners and "assistants" are abducted and detained across numerous cities in China. In response, tens of thousands of practitioners petition local, provincial and central appeals offices. In Beijing and other cities, protesters are detained in sports stadiums.
- 1999 – On 22 July, The Ministry of Civil Affairs declared the "Research Society of Falun Dafa and the Falun Gong organization under its control" to be unregistered, and therefore illegal, organizations. The same day, the Ministry of Public Security issues a notice prohibiting 1) the display of Falun Gong images or symbols; 2) the public distribution of Falun Gong books or literature; 3) assembling to perform group Falun Gong exercises; 4)using sit-ins, petitions, and other demonstrations in defense of Falun Gong; 5) the spreading of rumors meant to disturb social order; and 6) taking part in activities opposing the government's decision.
- 1999 – The 19 July circular is released publicly on 23 July. In it, Falun Gong is declared the "most serious political incident" since 1989. The Central Committee of the Chinese Communist Party forbids party members from practicing Falun Gong, and launches study sessions to ensure cadres understand that Falun Gong is incompatible with the belief system of Marxism.
- 1999 – on 26 July, the authorities begin the process of confiscating and destroying all publications related to Falun Gong, including "books, pictures, audio-video products, and electronic publications." Within one week, two million copies of Falun Gong literature are confiscated and destroyed by steam-rollers and public book burning.
- 1999 – In late July, overseas Falun Gong websites are hacked or subject to denial-of-service attack. According to Chinese internet expert Ethan Gutmann, the attacks originated from servers in Beijing and Shenzhen, and was among the first serious attempts at network disruption by China.
- 1999 – 29 July, Chinese authorities ask Interpol to seek the arrest of Li Hongzhi. Interpol declines. The following week, Chinese authorities offer a substantial cash reward for the extradition of Li from the United States. The U.S. government similarly declines to follow up.
- 1999 – On 29 July, the Beijing Bureau of Justice issues a notice requiring all lawyers and law firms to obtain approval before providing consultation or representation to Falun Gong practitioners. According to Human Rights Watch, the notice was "inconsistent with international standards which call on governments to ensure that lawyers are able to perform their professional functions without intimidating hindrance, harassment, or improper interference."
- 1999 – In October, 30 Falun Gong practitioners hold a secret press conference for foreign media in Beijing to tell of the violence and persecution they are suffering. At the end of the press briefing, participants are arrested, and some of the foreign reporters present are questioned and briefly detained. Ten of the organizers were detained almost immediately afterwards, and one of them, a 31-year-old hairdresser names Ding Yan, is later tortured to death in custody, according to Falun Gong sources. During the press conference, some of the first allegations of Falun Gong torture deaths in custody are made.
- 1999 – On 30 October, the National People's Congress of the People's Republic of China issues a resolution on article 300 of the criminal code. The resolution elaborates on the identification and punishments for individuals who use "heretical religions" to undermine the implementation of the law.
- 1999 – On 5 November 1999, the Supreme People's Court of the People's Republic of China issues a circular giving instruction to the people's courts that Falun Gong should be prosecuted as a 'heretical religion' under article 300. The notice, sent to all local courts in China, stressed that it was their political duty to severely punish Falun Gong, and to handle these cases under the leadership of the Party committees.
- 1999 – On 27 December, four high-profile Falun Gong practitioners are put on trial for "undermining the implementation of the law" and illegally obtaining state secrets. They include Beijing engineer and prominent Falun Gong organizer Zhiwen Wang, sentenced to 16 years in prison, and Li Chang, an official of the Ministry of Public Security, sentenced to 18 years. According to Amnesty International, in these prosecutions and others, "the judicial process was biased against the defendants at the outset and the trials were a mere formality."
- 2000 – On 20 April, Wall Street Journal reporter Ian Johnson publishes the first article in a series on Falun Gong. The article details the torture death of 58-year-old grandmother in Weifang city, who was beaten, shocked, and forced to run barefoot through the snow because she refused to denounce Falun Gong. Johnson went on to win the 2001 Pulitzer Prize for International Reporting for the series.
- 2000 – On 21 April, Xinhua News Agency admits for the first time the difficulty the Central authorities have had in stamping out Falun Gong, noting that since "22 July 1999, Falun Gong members have been causing trouble on and around Tiananmen Square in Central Beijing nearly every day."
- 2000 – Zhao Ming, a graduate student at Ireland's Trinity College, is sent to the Tuanhe forced labor camp in Beijing in May. He spends two years in the camp amidst international pressure for his release, and is reportedly tortured with electric batons.
- 2000 – On 1 October, thousands of Falun Gong practitioners travel to Tiananmen Square to stage protests against the persecution. Foreign media correspondents witness security officers beating and practitioners on the square.
- 2000 – In November, Zhang Kunlun, a Canadian citizen and professor of art, is detained while visiting his mother in China and held in a forced labor camp where he reported being beaten and shocked with electric batons. Canadian politicians intervene on his behalf, eventually winning his release to Canada.
- 2001 – On 23 January, five individuals set themselves on fire on Tiananmen Square. State-run media claim they are Falun Gong practitioners, driven to suicide by the practice. Falun Gong sources deny involvement, saying that Falun Gong forbids suicide and violence, and arguing that the event was staged by the government to turn public opinion against the practice. Authorities seize on the event to escalate a media campaign against the group, and support for Falun Gong wanes.
- 2001 – As sympathy for Falun Gong erodes in mainland China, authorities for the first time openly sanction the "systematic use of violence" against the group, establishing a network of brainwashing classes and rooting out Falun Gong practitioners "neighborhood by neighborhood and workplace by workplace."
- 2001 – By February, international concern grows over psychiatric abuses committed against Falun Gong practitioners, several hundred of whom had reportedly been held and tortured in psychiatric facilities for refusing to denounce the practice.
- 2001 – On 23 December, a New York District Court hands down a default judgement against Zhao Zhifei, Public Security Bureau chief for Hubei Province, for his role in the wrongful death and torture of Falun Gong practitioners.

=== 2002–2004 ===
By 2002, Falun Gong practitioners had all but completely abandoned the approach of protesting on Tiananmen Square, and coverage in Western news outlets declined precipitously.

Falun Gong practitioners continued adopting more novel approaches to protesting, including the establishment of a vast network of underground 'material sites' that create and distribute literature, and tapping into television broadcasts to replace them with Falun Gong content. Practitioners outside China established a television station to broadcast into China, designed censorship-circumvention tools to break through Internet censorship and surveillance, and filed dozens of largely symbolic lawsuits against Jiang Zemin and other Chinese officials alleging genocide and crimes against humanity.

From 2002 to 2004, the paramount position of power in China were transferred from Jiang Zemin to Hu Jintao. Annual Falun Gong deaths in custody continued to grow through 2004, according to reports published by Falun Gong sources, but coverage of Falun Gong declined over the period.

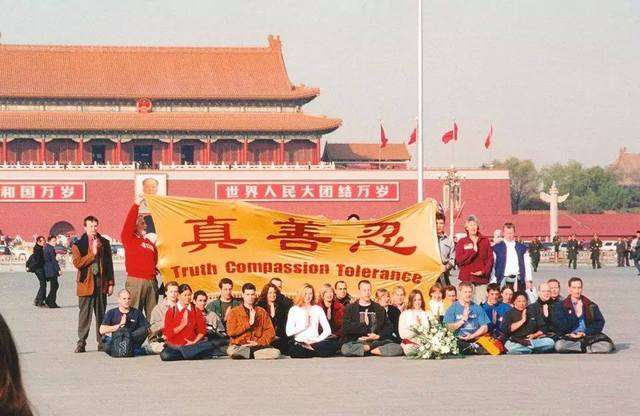
Westerners stages a demonstration in Tiananmen Square, 2002

- 2002 – On 14 February, 53 Falun Gong practitioners from North America, Europe and Australia attempt to stage a demonstration on Tiananmen Square. They are detained, and several reportedly assaulted by security forces before being expelled from China.
- 2002 – On 5 March, a group of six Falun Gong practitioners in Changchun city intercept television broadcasts, replacing them with content about Falun Gong and the persecution. Apparently believing that it to be a signal that the ban on Falun Gong had been lifted, citizens gather in public squares to celebrate. The Falun Gong broadcasts run for 50 minutes before the city goes black. Over the next three days, security forces arrest some 5,000 Falun Gong practitioners in Changchun. Amnesty International reports that "police 'stop-and-search' checkpoints have reportedly been established across the city." All six individuals involved in the television hijacking are later tortured to death.
- 2002 – In June, Jiang Zemin visits Iceland. Dozens of Falun Gong practitioners from around the world attempt to travel to the country to protest, but find their names on an international blacklist organized at the behest of Chinese authorities, suggesting extensive espionage against foreign Falun Gong practitioners.
- 2002 – Falun Gong practitioners in New York establish New Tang Dynasty Television, a Chinese-language station created to present an alternative to state-run Chinese media.
- 2002 – On 24 July, U.S. House of Representatives passes a unanimous resolution (House Concurrent Resolution 188) condemning the persecution of Falun Gong in China.
- 2002 – On 21 October, Falun Gong practitioners from North America, Europe and Australia file a legal case against Jiang Zemin, Zeng Qinghong, and Luo Gan to the United Nations Human Rights Committee and the International Criminal Court for their involvement in the persecution of Falun Gong.
- 2002 – In November, Hu Jintao begins the process of taking over China's leadership from Jiang Zemin, assuming the position General Secretary of the CCP.
- 2003 – On 1 May, Pan Xinchun, Deputy Consul General at the Chinese consulate in Toronto, published a letter in the Toronto Star in which he said that local Falun Gong practitioner Joel Chipkar is a member of a "sinister cult." In February 2004, the Ontario Superior Court found Pan liable for libel, and demanded he pay $10,000 in compensation to Chipkar. Pan refused to pay, and left Canada.
- 2003 – On 26 December, Liu Chengjun, one of the leaders behind the Changchun television broadcasts, is tortured to death while serving out a 19-year prison sentence.
- 2004 – In October, U.S. House of Representatives passed a unanimous resolution detailing and condemning the Chinese government's attempts to interfere with and intimidate Falun Gong practitioners in the United States.
- 2004 – In December, prominent Weiquan lawyer Gao Zhisheng writes to the National People's Congress detailing torture and sexual abuse against Falun Gong practitioners in custody. In response to his letter, Gao's law firm is shut down, his legal license is revoked, and he is put under house arrest.

=== 2005–2007 ===
As Falun Gong becomes more overt in its rhetorical charges against CCP rule, allegations emerge that Chinese security agencies engage in large-scale overseas spying operations against Falun Gong practitioners, and that Falun Gong prisoners in China are killed to supply China's organ transplant industry.

- 2005 – On 4 June, Chinese diplomat Chen Yonglin, a political consul at the Chinese consulate in Sydney, defects to Australia. He reports that a large part of his job was to monitor and harass Falun Gong practitioners in Australia. Days later, on 8 June, Hao Fengjun, a former member of the Tianjin city 610 office, goes public with his story of defection, and tells of abuse against Falun Gong in China.
- 2005 – On 16 June, Gao Rongrong is reported tortured to death in Shenyang at the age of 37.
- 2006 – UN special rapporteur on torture Manfred Nowak releases the findings of his 2005 investigation on torture in China. He reports that two-thirds of reported torture cases are against Falun Gong practitioners.
- 2006 – In July 2006, former Canadian Member of Parliament David Kilgour and international human rights attorney David Matas release the findings of their investigation into allegations of organ harvesting. Although their evidence was largely circumstantial, they conclude that involuntary organ extractions from Falun Gong practitioners are widespread and ongoing. Chinese officials deny the allegations.
- 2006 – Falun Gong practitioners in the United States establish Shen Yun Performing Arts, a classical Chinese dance company that begins touring internationally in 2007.
- 2007 – August, practitioners of Falun Gong launch the Human Rights Torch Relay, which toured to over 35 of countries in 2007 and 2008 ahead of the 2008 Beijing Olympics. The relay was intended to draw attention to a range of human rights issues in China in connection with the Olympics, especially those related to Falun Gong and Tibet, and received support from hundreds of elected officials, past Olympic medallists, human rights groups and other concerned organizations.

=== 2008–2014 ===
Top-level Chinese authorities continue to launch strike-hard campaigns against Falun Gong surrounding sensitive events and anniversaries, and step up efforts to coercively "transform" Falun Gong practitioners in detention facilities and reeducation centers. Lawyers who seek to represent Falun Gong defendants continue to face punishment from Chinese authorities, including harassment, disbarment, and imprisonment.

- 2008 – On 6 February, popular folk musician Yu Zhou is tortured to death 11 days after being taken into custody in Beijing. His wife, artist Xu Na, is sentenced to 3 years in prison for possessing Falun Gong literature.

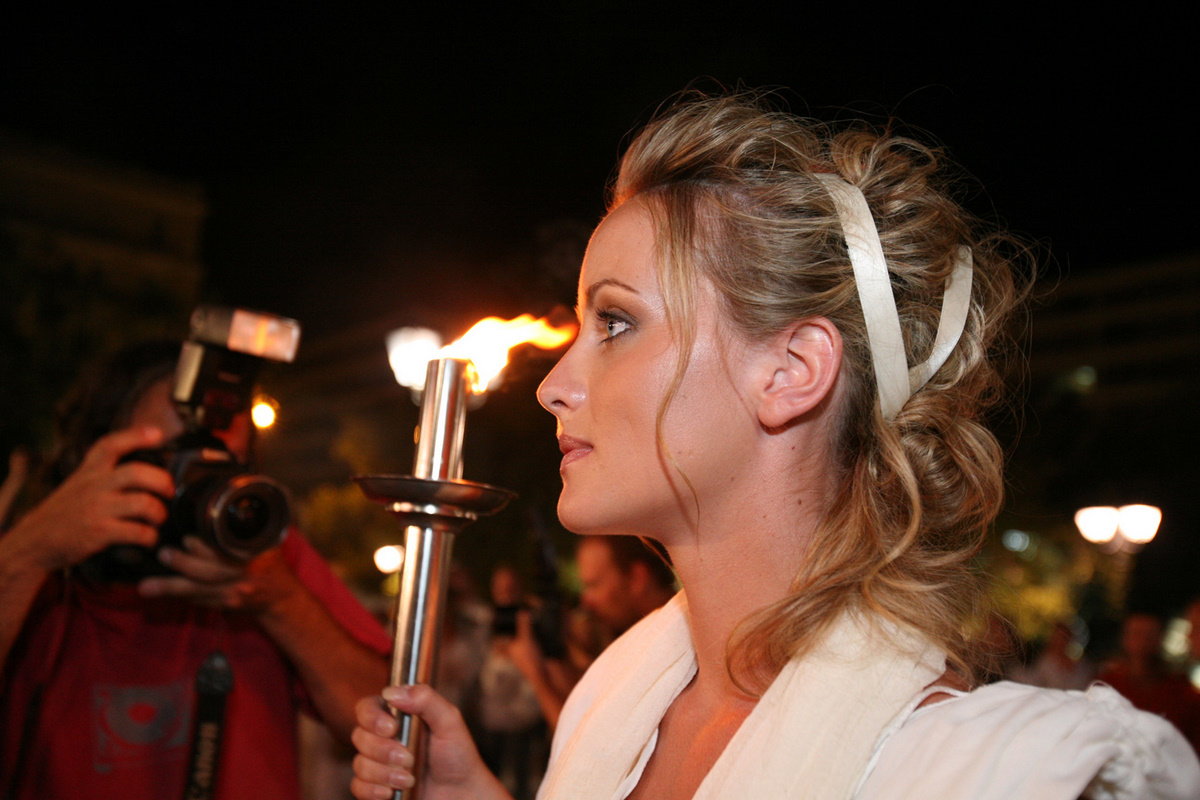
The human rights torch relay launch in Athens, Greece, 9 August 2007.

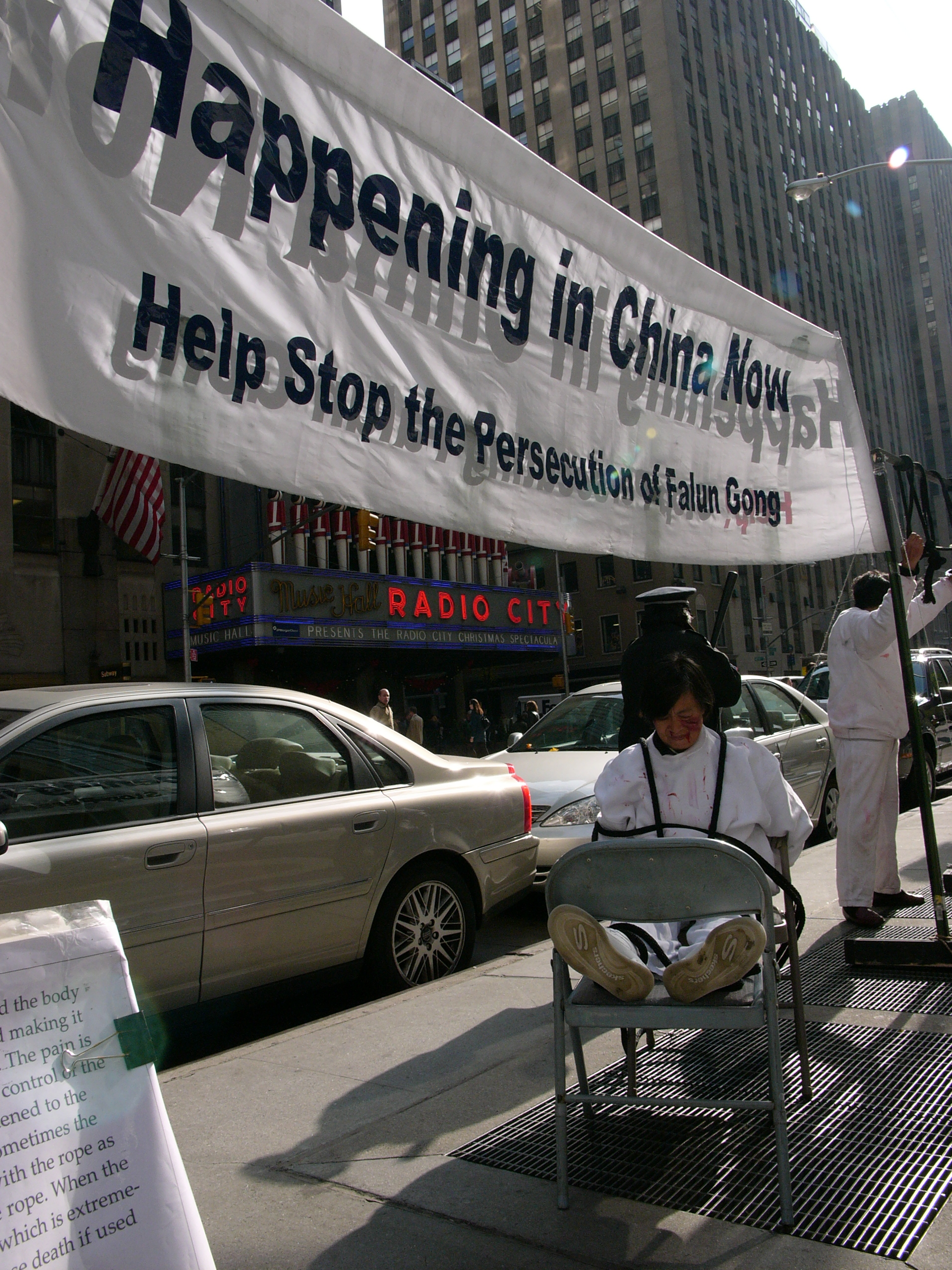
Falun Gong practitioners enact torture scenes in New York City

- 2009 – CCP heir apparent Xi Jinping is put in charge of 6521 Project, a strike hard effort to crack down on Tibetans, democracy activists and Falun Gong practitioners around sensitive anniversaries. Zhou Yongkang heads a parallel effort to crack down on Falun Gong practitioners, ethnic separatism, and protests.
- 2009 – In March, U.S. House of Representatives passes a resolution on recognizing and condemning the ongoing persecution of Falun Gong in China.
- 2009 – On 13 May, Weiquan lawyers Zhang Kai(张凯) and Li Chunfu(李春富) are violently beaten and detained in Chongqing for investigating the death of Jiang Xiqing(江锡清), a 66-year-old Falun Gong practitioner killed in a labor camp.
- 2009 – On 4 July, Dalian city lawyer Wang Yonghang(王永航) is taken from his home by security agents, interrogated, and beaten for defending Falun Gong practitioners. In November 2009, Wang was sentenced in a closed court to seven years in prison for his advocacy on behalf of Falun Gong practitioners. When his lawyers were permitted to see him in January 2010, they reported that he had been tortured.
- 2009 – In November, Jiang Zemin and other high-ranking Chinese officials are indicted by a Spanish court on charges of genocide and crimes against humanity for their involvement in the persecution of Falun Gong. A month later, an Argentine judge concludes that top Chinese officials Jiang Zemin and Luo Gan had adopted a "genocidal strategy" in pursuing the eradication of Falun Gong, and asks Interpol to seek their arrest
- 2010 – Over 100 Falun Gong practitioners in Shanghai are abducted and detained in connection with the Shanghai World Expo. Some reportedly face torture for their refusal to disavow Falun Gong.
- 2010 – In the Spring of 2010, Chinese authorities launch a new, three-year campaign whose goal is to coercively transform large portions of the known Falun Gong population through attendance in reeducation classes.
- 2010 – On 22 April 2010, Beijing lawyers Liu Wei and Tang Jitian were permanently disbarred for defending Falun Gong practitioners.
- 2011 – In February, a Falun Gong practitioner named Qin Yueming dies in custody at the Jiamusi Prison. His family state that his body was covered with extensive bruising, with blood in his nose, though authorities said the cause of death was heart attack. A petition seeking redress for his death garners over 15,000 signatures. Qin's wife and daughter are subsequently imprisoned and reportedly tortured for their efforts to draw attention to the case.
- 2011 – In May, a lawsuit is filed on behalf of Falun Gong practitioners against Cisco. The suit alleges, based mainly on internal Cisco documents, that the technology company "designed and implemented a surveillance system for the Chinese Communist Party, knowing it would be used to root out members of the Falun Gong religion and subject them to detention, forced labor and torture."
- 2011 – In Hebei province, 3,000 Chinese citizens sign a petition calling for the release of detained Falungong practitioners Zhou Xiangyang and Li Shanshan, who were being held at the Gangbei Prison and Tangshan reeducation center, respectively.
- 2012 – In June 2012, 15,000 people in Heilongjiang Province signed and affixed their fingerprints to a petition requesting that the government investigate the death of Qin Yueming, a Falun Gong practitioner who died in custody.
- 2012 – In early June, Falun Gong practitioner Li Lankui was detained and sent to a reeducation-through-labour camp in Hebei province. Hundreds of villagers mobilized to call for Li's release, including by signing petitions calling for an end to the persecution of Falun Gong. This prompted further crackdowns by security agents, leading to the arrest of at least 16 villagers. Some reported that they were tortured for expressing their support for Li Lankui.
- 2012 – in December, a woman in Oregon finds a letter written in both Chinese and English in a box of Halloween decorations purchased from Kmart. The letter said that the decorations were assembled in Unit 8, Department 2 of Masanjia forced labour camp. It went on to describe forced labor conditions in the camp, and noted that many of the detainees were Falun Gong practitioners being held without trial. The letter's author, a Falun Gong practitioner from Beijing, was later identified by The New York Times.
- 2013 – Central 610 Office authorities launch a new three-year campaign calling for the ideological "transformation" of Falun Gong practitioners. Local governments issue quotas and targets for the number of Falun Gong practitioners to reeducate, and prescribe the appropriate means for doing so.
- 2013 – A photojournalism magazine in China publishes an exposé detailing human rights abuses committed by female detainees at the Masanjia forced labour camp in Shenyang, where Falun Gong practitioners were estimated to comprise approximately half the detainees. The article was promptly removed from the magazine's website, but not before galvanizing nationwide opposition to and condemnation of the labor camp system. Soon thereafter, New York Times photographer Du Bin releases a documentary on the Masanjia labor camp.
- 2013 – Chinese officials begin dismantling the nationwide network of reeducation-through-labour camps, in which Falun Gong practitioners comprised a significant portion of detainees. Human rights groups expressed skepticism at the scope of reforms, however, noting that other forms of extralegal detention were still being used to detain Falun Gong practitioners and political dissidents.
- 2014 – In August, investigative journalist Ethan Gutmann publishes his book "The Slaughter: Mass Killings, Organ Harvesting, and China's Secret Solution to Its Dissident Problem," in which he writes that large number of Falun Gong practitioners and ethnic Uyghurs have been killed for their organs in China.
- 2014 – Four lawyers in Northeast China are detained and reportedly tortured by the police while investigating abuses against Falun Gong practitioners held at the Qinglongshan farm reeducation centre.
