= Zhou Yu (disambiguation) =

Zhou Yu (175–210), Han dynasty general who served the warlords Sun Ce and his successor Sun Quan

Zhou Yu may also refer to:

- Zhouyu, Duke of Wey (fl. 8th century BC), Spring and Autumn ruler, sometime known as Zhouxu
- Liao, King of Wu (fl. 6th century BC), known as Zhouyu in the Spring and Autumn Annals of Wu and Yue
- Zhou Yu (Renming) (fl. 190s), Han dynasty official who served the warlords Cao Cao and Yuan Shao
- Zhou Yu (canoeist) (born 1989), Chinese sprint canoeist
- Zhou Yu (table tennis) (born 1992), Chinese table tennis player
- Zhou Yu (cyclist), Chinese cyclist

== See also ==
- Chou Tzu-yu (born 1999, Zhou Zi-yu in Pinyin), Taiwanese singer and member of Korean girl group TWICE
- Yu Zhou, Chinese folk musician and Falun Gong practitioner who died in police custody
