= Xiao Juan and Residents From the Valley =

Chinese band

Xiao Juan and Residents From the Valley (小娟和山谷里的居民) is a Chinese folk band founded in 1998, with Wang Xiujuan (artist name Xiao Juan) as lead singer. She was born in Wuhan, Hubei province, and started to sing when she was 3 years old. She studied finance and law, but decided to have a career as a singer. In 1993, she came to Beijing as a university student, and started to write songs. She became a full-time singer/songwriter a year later. She first was the lead singer of the electronica duo Gemini Trip. Xiao Juan is handicapped and cannot travel very comfortably.

The band originally consisted of Xiao Juan, Li Qiang (artist name Xiao Qiang) and Yu Zhou. Li, soul mate of Xiao Juan, is from Xinjiang and began learning guitar when he was 15. Yu Zhou was the drummer of the band. He was arrested for being a member of Falun Gong and died in prison under unclarified circumstances on 6 Feb 2008.

Liu Xiaoguang (flute, harmonica and keyboard) joined the band in 2008 and Arai Soichiro (drums) in 2009. Liu majored in saxophone and piano, Soichiro was the chief percussionist for the Hong Kong Youth Symphony Orchestra.

In 2010 the band visited Taiwan and wrote an album 'From Taipei to Tamshui' as a result of the trip. For this album, the band selected 15 classic Taiwanese folk songs and refashioned them.

== Discography ==
Albums:

- The Past As The Wind (2005)
- Recalling The Past (2007)
- Red Cloth And Green Flower (2008)
- From Taipei to Tamshui (2010)
- City in C Major (2012)

EP:

- Music from the Valley (2009)
