= Masanjia re-education through labor camp =

Labor camp in China

Coordinates: 41.89929°N 123.255062°E

Masanjia Labor Camp (simplified Chinese: 马三家劳教所; traditional Chinese: 馬三家勞教所; pinyin: Mǎsānjiā Láojiào Suǒ) is a "re-education" through labor camp located in the Yuhong district near Shenyang, in the Liaoning province of China. The facility is sometimes called the Ideology Education School of Liaoning Province.

It was first established in 1956 under China's re-education through labor, or laojiao policy, and was expanded in 1999 in order to detain and "re-educate" followers of the Falun Gong spiritual practice. According to former detainees, Falun Gong practitioners represent 50–80% of inmates in the camp. Other prisoners include petty criminals, prostitutes, drug addicts, petitioners, and members of other unapproved religious minorities, such as underground Christians.

Followers of the Falun Gong spiritual practice have long sought to publicize human rights abuses committed in the labor camp, which they describe as being among the most notorious in China. In addition to performing forced labor, prisoners are allegedly tortured using electric batons, force-feeding, prolonged solitary confinement, and other forms of abuse. These allegations received international attention in 2013 when a magazine exposé on Masanjia was published—and then quickly removed—after China issued a directive prohibiting the publication and reporting of the story.

== Establishment ==
The Masanjia Labor Camp was established on 9 March 1956. In accordance with China's reeducation-through-labor practices, prisoners could be held at the camp without trial, often for petty crimes or political offenses. In July 1999, Chinese leader Jiang Zemin initiated a campaign to suppress the Falun Gong spiritual group, which was estimated to have tens of millions of adherents. Those who refused to renounce the practice were sent to labor camps to be "transformed." In order to implement the campaign, Masanjia was expanded in October 1999, and the 2nd Female Division was established for the purpose of detaining recalcitrant Falun Gong practitioners. This was later merged with the 1st Female Division.

== Detainee population ==
According to a New York Times report published in June 2013, Falun Gong and members of underground Christian churches made up the bulk of the inmates; there were also prostitutes, drug addicts, and petitioners who had been more persistent than was tolerable to local authorities. Former inmates described forced labor and abuse with recalcitrant Falun Gong members targeted for extensive and sustained abuse.

Although Chinese authorities have not disclosed exact number of Falun Gong followers held in re-education through labor camps, they did confirm in January 2001 that at least 470 Falun Gong practitioners were detained at Masanjia. In August 2001, Chinese official media reported that the labor camp had "succeeded in 're-educating' more than 90 per cent of the 1,000 female Falun Gong members housed there".

== Torture allegations ==
There have been persistent reports of torture and other human rights abuses committed at Masanjia. According to former detainees interviewed by the New York Times, the most sustained and severe treatment is meted out to the Falun Gong practitioners, but other groups also experience abuses.

Yuan Ling, a Chinese reporter who spent five years interviewing former prisoners of Masanjia, said that physical punishment in the camp is common, and some women are left crippled. An exposé by Yuan in China's Lens Magazine described a variety of torture methods used at the camp, where detainees were reportedly shocked in the face with electric prods, suspended by the arms, and beaten. Another method described in the article is the "tiger bench", where an inmate is seated on a bench, tied at the waist and bent forward with hands and feet immobilized, and with bricks placed under the feet. The "dead person's bed" involved having four limbs spread apart on a bed and being left there for prolonged periods. "There might or might not be a hole through which she could defecate", wrote the International Herald Tribune. Former female inmates also describe being held in solitary confinement for months at a time in cells with two square meters of floor space. In the cells, the women lacked access to toilets, and had to relieve themselves on the floors. Wang Chunying, who was detained at Masanjia in 2007, told the Japan Times that she was stretched and handcuffed to two bunk beds for 16 hours, unable to eat, drink or sleep. Another former detainee said she was handcuffed to a door in a standing position for two consecutive weeks.

== Economy of the camp ==
According to a report compiled in 2013 products, including military uniforms, were produced for the domestic market with some products being produced for export. Laborers were sometimes obtained by purchasing prisoners from local jurisdictions.

== Media coverage ==
On 23 December 2012, The Oregonian reported that an American woman named Julie Keith found a letter, written in alternating Chinese and English, stuffed into a Halloween decoration set she had purchased at a Kmart. The letter, whose authenticity has been verified by CNN, said that the set was assembled in Unit 8, Department 2 of Masanjia forced labor camp. It went on to describe forced labor conditions in the camp, and noted that many of the detainees were Falun Gong practitioners held without trial. Under U.S. law, it is illegal to import items manufactured through forced labor. U.S. Immigration and Customs Enforcement is reportedly looking into the allegations contained in the letter. Kmart reported being unable to trace the product, plastic tombstones, to the camp. In 2013 the purported author of the letter surfaced in Beijing. The man, who gave his surname only as Zhang, was a Falun Gong follower who had been imprisoned at the camp. He claimed to have written about two dozen notes and enclosed them in products whose packaging indicated an English speaking destination. The incident was profiled in the 2018 documentary film Letter from Masanjia.

In April 2013, China's Lens Magazine included a 14-page exposé on abuses at Masanjia labor camp. The 20,000-word investigative story was based on interviews with approximately 20 former inmates, who recalled being subjected to forced labor and a variety of torture methods in the camp. The article caused a sensation domestically, and reinvigorated calls to reform the forced labor system. By 8 April—just two days after the report was published—at least 420,000 people had participated in online discussions about the report. The next day, the Central Propaganda Department of the Chinese Communist Party issued instructions prohibiting news organizations from "reposting, reporting, or commenting" on the Lens report.

Shortly after the Lens article was published, filmmaker and former New York Times photographer Du Bin released a documentary about the Masanjia labor camp, titled "Women Above Ghost's Head". The title is a reference to the fact that Masanjia was built on top of a graveyard, according to former prisoner Liu Hua. The film was banned in mainland China, and Du Bin was detained.

== See also ==
- List of re-education through labor camps in China
