= Du Bin =

Chinese journalist, photographer, poet and documentary filmmaker

Du Bin 杜斌
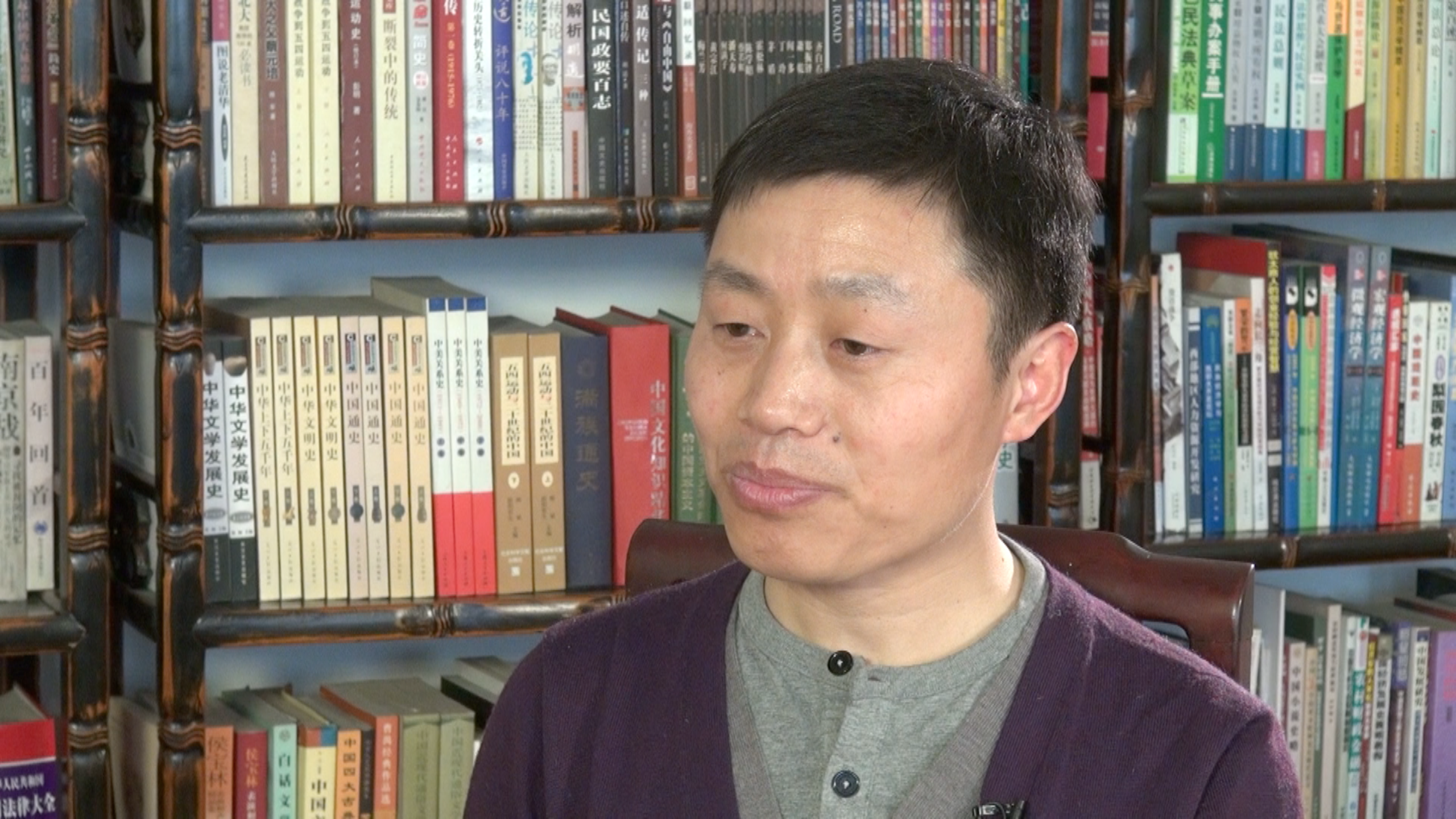
- Born: 1972 (age 53–54); Shandong
- Occupation: Photojournalist

Du Bin (Chinese: 杜斌; pinyin: Dù Bīn; born 1972) is a Chinese journalist, photographer, poet and documentary film-maker. Self-taught in photography, Du has worked as a contract photographer for The New York Times since 2011, and has also been published in the International Herald Tribune, Time, and the Guardian. He is originally from Tancheng, Shandong, China, and is based in Beijing. Du was detained by Beijing authorities in June 2013 after releasing a feature-length documentary about the Masanjia Labor Camp.

== Notable works ==
Du wrote the first biography of the artist Ai Weiwei, called God Ai (艾神).

In 2013 he released Above the Ghosts' Head: The Women of Masanjia Labour Camp (小鬼頭上的女人), a documentary on torture and other abuses in China's Masanjia Labor Camp. The film was banned in mainland China, but was shown at least once in Hong Kong and Taiwan, and then posted online. He also had a 600-page book on the 1989 military crackdown published, called Tiananmen Square Massacre (天安門屠殺). The book, which compiles a number of already published accounts of 4 June crackdown, was published in late May by Mirror Books.

== 2013 detention ==
On 1 June 2013, soon after the release of the book and the film, Du Bin was detained by state security agents in Beijing. Friends say that they found two unsigned police warrants in his home for "disturbing public order." Under Chinese administrative statutes, police could use the charge to hold Du for up to 15 days, after which he should either be released, sent to a re-education through labor camp, or formally charged with a crime. As of 13 June, Du was still being held at the Fengtai District detention center. Amnesty International and Reporters Without Borders called for his release.

Du Bin was released on bail on 8 July 2013, but his freedom is tenuous. He could still face formal charges for "picking quarrels and making trouble," and he expects that his movements will be monitored. The Chinese government has censored his name from Sina Weibo.

== 2020 detention ==
Du Bin was detained in December 2020. He was charged with "picking quarrels and provoking trouble" and is being held at a detention centre in Daxing District. His family had been warned not to speak to the media. He was detained a month before his book on Vladimir Lenin was due to be released. The Committee to Protect Journalists have called for his release.

== 2025 detention ==
On October 15, 2025, Du Bin was taken away by Beijing police. Over 40 days later, he was formally arrested and is currently detained at Shunyi Detention Center in Beijing. His family had not received any legal documents. This marks Du Bin's third secret arrest, drawing international attention.

He is accused of “picking quarrels and provoking trouble,” a charge frequently used by the Chinese government to suppress journalists and press freedom defenders. The Committee to Protect Journalists, Reporters without Borders (RSF), PetaPixel have reported on and voiced concerns regarding the case, among other media.

“The international community must step up pressure on Beijing to secure Du’s release, along with that of all other journalists and press freedom defenders detained in China.” Antoine Bernard, RSF Director of Advocacy and Assistance, says in a statement.

== Books ==
- Petitioners: Living Fossils Who Survived China's Rule of Law (上訪者 : 中國以法治國下倖存的活化石)(2007) ISBN 9789628958337
- Shanghai Calvary (上海 骷髅地) (2010) ISBN 9789868616004
- Beijing's Ghosts (北京的鬼) (2010) ISBN 9629381052
- Toothbrush (牙刷 : 紅色星球上人類最後的進化) (2011) ISBN 9789866216985
- Chairman Mao's Purgatory (毛主席的煉獄) (2011) ISBN 9781935981190
- God Ai (艾神) (2012) ISBN 9789881644213
- Mao Zedong's Regime of Human Flesh (毛澤東的人肉政權) (2013) ISBN 9781935981824
- Tiananmen Square Massacre, (天安門屠殺) (2013) ISBN 9781940004051
- Vaginal Coma (陰道昏迷) (2014) ISBN 978-988-13094-0-2
- Roar of Masanjia (馬三家咆哮) (2015) ISBN 978-988-13094-8-8
- Changchun Hunger Siege 1947.11.4-1948.10.19 (長春餓殍戰) (2017) ISBN 9789863582748
- Red Terror: Lenin's Communist Experiment (赤色恐怖: 列寧的共產主義實驗) (2021) ISBN 9789863586135
- Chairman Mao's Father and Daughter Prisoners (毛主席的父女囚犯) (2021, Du Bin as Editor) ISBN 9789865559847

== Documentaries ==
- Above the Ghosts' Head: The Women of Masanjia Labour Camp (小鬼頭上的女人) (2013) Edited version

== Awards ==
The photographic work “Writing Wrongs,” published in the South China Morning Post, received the “Photojournalism Features Award” at the 14th Asian Human Rights Press Awards in May 2010. The award was judged by the Hong Kong Journalists Association, the Foreign Correspondents' Club of Hong Kong, and Amnesty International Hong Kong.
