= Death of Yu Zhou =

Chinese folk musician and Falun Gong practitioner

Yu Zhou (simplified Chinese: 于宙; traditional Chinese: 於宙; pinyin: Yú Zhòu) was a Chinese folk musician and Falun Gong practitioner who died in police custody in February 2008, at the age of 42. Ten days before his death, traffic police stopped the professional musician in Beijing, allegedly for speeding on the way home from a concert. After they found Falun Gong paraphernalia in his car, authorities detained Yu. His wife Xu Na, who had previously been imprisoned for her practicing Falun Gong, was also taken into custody.

According to authorities, Yu Zhou's condition in custody deteriorated as a result of a hunger strike or a complication stemming from diabetes. His family said he did not have diabetes, and instead contends that he was killed as a result of mistreatment in custody. Yu Zhou's lawyer said they believe he may have been beaten to death, but because authorities refused to permit an autopsy, evidence could not be collected.

Yu Zhou's death was cited by international press and advocacy groups as evidence of the Chinese government's continued suppression of Falun Gong. It was also noted an example of the government's efforts to suppress domestic opposition groups immediately preceding the 2008 Summer Olympic games in Beijing.

== Background ==
Yu Zhou was a graduate of the Beijing University, where he studied French language. He performed in a folk music ensemble called Xiao Juan and Residents From the Valley, which released two successful albums and was featured on the Hong Kong-based Phoenix Television. He was married to Xu Na (Chinese: 许那; pinyin: Xǔ Nà), a poet and painter two years his younger. And after the Ministry of Public Security issued a circular in 1999 forbidding citizens from practicing Falun Gong in groups, possessing or displaying Falun Gong materials, or protesting the ban, Xu was imprisoned from 2001 to 2006 for her association with Falun Gong.

== Arrest and death ==
On 26 January 2008, Yu Zhou and Xu were pulled over by police for speeding while driving home from a concert in Beijing. Police found Falun Gong literature and a CD in the car, and took the couple into custody, where ten days later, on 6 February, Yu Zhou died. His family was called to the Qinghe District Emergency Center to claim his body. The medical center and authorities told his family that he had staged a hunger strike and died from dehydration or some other diabetic complication. Yu's sister, Yu Qun, maintained that he did not have diabetes and was healthy at the time of arrest, and that his death was a result of abuse in custody. Yu Qun denied her brother and sister-in-law did anything to break the law or that they were promoting Falun Gong.

Over a year later, Yu's family reported that police and prosecutors continued to deny requests for a death certificate or an autopsy. Cheng Hai, a Beijing human rights lawyer, said "there are suspicions that he was beaten to death while in prison, but so far we have been unable to collect any evidence." In a 2008 interview with Agence France-Presse, the Tongzhou Detention Center where Cheng said Yu Zhou was held denied any knowledge of him. Xu Na, was sentenced to three years in prison in November 2008. According to her lawyer, she was convicted of possessing and intending to distribute 53 documents and eight computer disks of Falun Gong publications.

=== Reaction ===
Yu was one of approximately 100 Falun Gong practitioners reported to have died in custody in 2008. Christie Blatchford of the Globe and Mail briefly noted Yu's case in her wider story, traveling to the emergency medical center where a Falun Gong website believes that his body was being held. The New York Times and the Associated Press cited Yu's case as evidence of the Chinese government's continued campaign against Falun Gong ten years after the official crackdown. The Sunday Times reported on the case as an example of increased state pressure against domestic opposition groups ahead of the 2008 Beijing Olympics.

The case was also named in reports by the U.S. Department of State, the U.S. Congressional-Executive Commission on China, and Amnesty International and Freedom House.

Chinese official media did not make any public comments on or otherwise report the story. However, fans of Yu Zhou's music mourned his death online. One supporter wrote on a Chinese website: "Fuck authority. Another beautiful soul has left the world."

== See also ==
- Human rights in China
- Concerns and controversies over the 2008 Summer Olympics
