= History of qigong =

- Traditional Chinese: 氣功
- Simplified Chinese: 气功
Transcriptions
Standard Mandarin
- Hanyu Pinyin: qìgōng
Wu
- Romanization: chi-kung
Yue: Cantonese
- Jyutping: hei3 gung1
Southern Min
- Hokkien POJ: khì-kong

Qigong, the Chinese practice of aligning breath, movement, and awareness for exercise, healing, and martial arts training, has a history that extends back more than 4,000 years. Contemporary qigong is a complex accretion of the ancient Chinese meditative practice xingqi or "circulating qi" and the gymnastic breathing exercise daoyin or "guiding and pulling", with roots in the I Ching and occult arts; philosophical traditions of Confucianism, Taoism, and Buddhism, traditional Chinese medicine and martial arts; along with influences of contemporary concepts of health, science, meditation, and exercise.

== Origins and ancient history ==
Archeological evidence suggests that the first forms of qigong can be linked to ancient shamanic meditative practice and gymnastic exercises. For example, a nearly 7000-year-old Neolithic vessel depicts a priest-shaman (巫覡; wuxi) in the essential posture of meditative practice and gymnastic exercise of early qigong. Shamanic rituals and ideas eventually evolved and formalized into Taoist beliefs and were incorporated into the field of traditional Chinese medicine.

== Roots in traditional medicine, philosophy, and martial arts ==
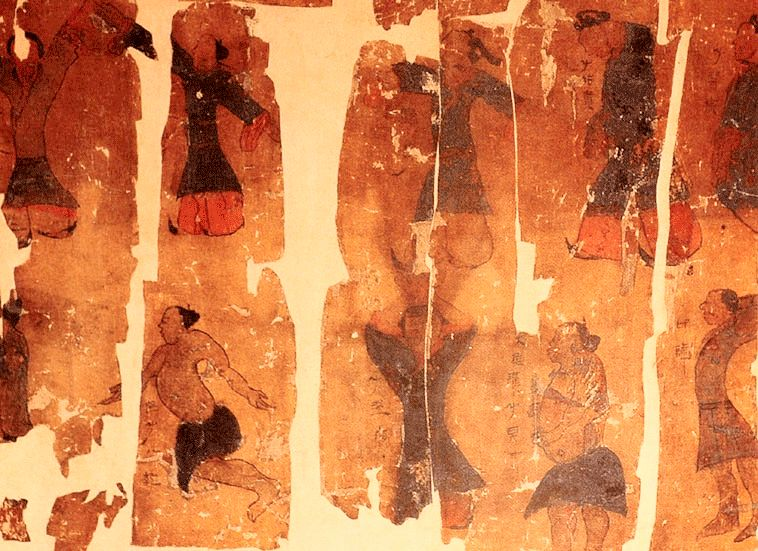
The physical exercise chart; a painting on silk depicting the practice of daoyin; unearthed in 1973 in Hunan Province, China, from the 2nd-century BC burial Mawangdui Han tombs site, Tomb Number 3.

According to the traditional Chinese medical community, the origin of qigong is commonly attributed to the legendary Yellow Emperor (2696–2598 BCE) and the classic Huangdi Neijing book of internal medicine. One Chinese Scholar suggested that Confucius and Mencius as the founders of the "Scholar qigong tradition", because in their writings, they alluded to the concepts of qi training as methods of moral training, while he admitted that the references are not clear.

In the Taoist tradition, the writings of Laozi and Zhuang Zhou are regarded by some as describing both meditative cultivation and physical exercises as means to extend one's lifespan, and to access higher realms of existence. The Taoist inner alchemical cultivation around the Song dynasty continued those Taoist traditions.

The Mawangdui Silk Texts (168 BCE) shows a series of daoyin exercises that bears physical resemblance to some of the health exercises being practiced today.

Buddhism, originating in India and having its source in the Hindu culture, developed an extensive system of meditation and physical cultivation similar to yoga to help the practitioner achieve enlightenment, awakening one to one's true self. When Buddhism was transmitted to China, some of those practices were assimilated and eventually modified by the indigenous culture. The resulting transformation was the start of the Chinese Buddhist qigong tradition. Meditative practice was emphasized and a series of qigong exercises known as the Yijin Jing ("Muscle/Tendon Change Classic") was attributed to Bodhidharma. The Chinese martial arts community eventually identify the Yijing Jing as one of the secret training methods in Shaolin martial arts.

Chinese martial arts practitioners, influenced by all the different elements within Chinese society, adapted and modified qigong theory with the goal of improving their fighting abilities. Many Chinese martial arts paid homage to Taoism or Buddhism by claiming them as their original source. For example, tai chi is often described as being Taoist in origin. Shaolin martial arts is named after the famous Buddhist Shaolin temple.

The exchange of ideas between those different segments within Chinese society created rich, complex, and sometimes contradictory theory and methods of training. The difficulty in determining the correct training method, the traditional master-student method of transmission, and the belief that qigong represents a special and valuable knowledge limited the research and development of qigong to small but elite elements within Chinese society. Specialized texts were available, but were secretive and cryptic, and therefore limited to a selective few. For the general population, qigong practice was a component of traditional Chinese medicine. This medical system was developed based on experience, along with philosophical and folk practices.

== Qigong in 20th-century China ==
=== Communist early era ===
Concerted efforts to re-establish Chinese culture under a new ideology began after the creation of the People's Republic of China in 1945. The new ruling government under the leadership of Mao Zedong rejected all ties to traditional Chinese philosophies such as Confucianism, Taoism, and Buddhism. Instead, the Chinese government promoted a modernizing socialist view. Through a series of government directed programs that lasted for nearly three decades (1949–1976), the entire fabric of Chinese society was reorganized. It was in this environment that the current attitude toward qigong was born in Mainland China.

According to sociologist David A. Palmer in Qigong Fever: Body, Science, and Utopia in China, it was in the early 1950s when qigong began to attain national prominence in China during an ideological turn against Western influence. Within the Chinese Communist Party, there were voices insisting for China to find its own path in the world and criticized those who believed that China needed to rely more on modern science and technology, and less on ideological correctness. In Hebei, many high ranking party officials appreciated qigong as being "intrinsically Chinese" and viewed it as a culturally accessible form of healthcare.

Mao Zedong himself recognized the conflicting aims between the rejection of feudalistic ideas of the past and the benefits derived from those ideas. Traditional Chinese medicine was a clear example of this conflict. His solution can be summarized by his famous phrase "Chinese medicine is a great treasure house! We must make efforts to uncover it and raise its standards!", which legitimized the practice of traditional Chinese medicine and created an impetus to develop a stronger scientific basis. The subject of qigong underwent a similar process of transformation. The historical elements of qigong were stripped to create a more scientific basis for the practice.

In the early 1950s, Liu Guizhen (劉貴珍) (1920–83), a doctor by training, used his family's method of body cultivation to successfully cure himself of various ailments. He then promoted his method to his patients and eventually published a book, Qigong liaofa shiyan (氣功療法實驗) to promote his successes. His efforts to re-define qigong without a religious or philosophical context proved to be acceptable to the ruling government. The popularity and success of Liu's book and the government's strong support for Traditional Chinese medicine resulted in the formation of qigong departments within universities and hospitals that practiced Traditional Chinese medicine. As a result, the first institutional support for qigong was established across China, but this practice remained under tight control and had limited access by the general public.

In 1961-64, Chairman Mao attacked the party leaders who supported qigong and from the mid-1960s through the late 1970s, particularly during the Cultural Revolution, publications on qigong largely ceased and related clinics and institutions were closed.

=== The era of reconstruction ===
In the late 1970s, with the fall of the Gang of Four and the start Era of Reconstruction, there was a new openness in Chinese society. During Deng Xiaoping's Four Modernizations in 1977, the government prioritized modernization, including scientific research, and due to the simplicity and cheapness of qigong, it became sanctioned by the government as one of the topics to scientifically explore. The practice of qigong also spread from an institutional setting to a popular movement led by charismatic promoters. Guo Lin (郭林), a Beijing artist who claimed to have cured herself of uterine cancer in the 1960s, was one of the first qigong masters to teach qigong openly to the general public outside an institutional setting. Scientists, free from the repression of the Cultural Revolution, were able to seek new challenges. Among the new subjects of inquiry, they studied the effects of qigong and provided scientific foundations for qigong practice. In 1979, Gu Hansen of the Shanghai Institute of Atomic Research first reported on the external measurement of qi. This research proved to be critical in promoting the notion of a scientific basis for qigong. Other reports of external evidence of qi quickly followed. Other forms of measurements, personal testimonies on the effectiveness of qigong treatment and demonstration of the uses of qigong found in the martial arts were used to illustrate the practical realities of the qigong.

In the early 1980s, the enthusiasm for this new external qi paradigm eventually led to the use of qi as an explanation for paranormal abilities such as Extrasensory perception (ESP) and psychokinesis. The increasingly exaggerated claims of qigong practice prompted some elements within the Chinese government to warn of the dangers of this paranormal craze and the prevalence of pseudoscientific beliefs.

There was a heated debate that had reached the highest political forums in China. Leading public figures such as Qian Xuesen, an eminent scientist and founder of Chinese Rocketry, and Zhang Zhenhuan, a former general, rushed to defend qigong practice. They championed the view that qigong was a new science of the mind. However, other prominent figures, including physicist He Zuoxiu and economist Yu Guangyuan, vice-chairman of the Chinese Academy of Social Sciences and an adviser to Chinese leader Deng Xiaoping, publicly opposed claims of "extrasensory perception" (ESP) promoted by qigong masters, describing them as pseudoscience.

A compromise on the support of qigong activities was eventually reached by various factions within the Chinese government. Qigong activity was to be regulated, with the establishment of the China Qigong Scientific Research Association under the leadership of Zhang Zhenhuan. Overt criticism of the paranormal research was to be muted.

By the middle of the 1980s, there were more than 2000 qigong organizations and between 60 and 200 million practitioners across China, almost one fifth of the Chinese population. This growth was fueled by the tacit support of small elements within the Chinese government, reduced criticism of qigong practice, pent-up demand within Chinese society for alternative belief systems, and improved methods of communication that resulted in mass adaptation of qigong practice, in what has been termed "qigong fever". By the end of the 1980s, qigong practices could be found within all segments of Chinese society.

Palmer noted a 1991 text that described claims of "extraordinary abilities", including; penetrating vision, distant vision, distant sensation, the ability to immobilise one's body, and the ability to fly. Palmer described these claims as resembling abilities commonly depicted in gongfu films. On December 5, 1994, the Chinese Communist Party Central Committee and the State Council jointly issued a landmark policy document titled "Several Suggestions on Promoting the Popularization of Science and Technology". The policy document lamented that it was "shocking" to see "superstitious and benighted activities became increasingly rampant" in the country. The government subsequently gave greater prominence to skeptical voices, including notably He Zuoxiu, who had published work challenging claims made by a famous ESP claimant Zhang Baosheng and arguing that his claimed supernatural abilities were fraudulent.

By the end of the 1990s, the explosive growth in the number of qigong practitioners had led to the revival of the old traditions that accompanied qigong development. Qigong organizations such as Falun Gong re-introduced moral and religious elements associated with their training methods. Such practices eventually led to direct conflict with the central authorities. By 1999, there was a systematic crackdown on qigong organizations that were perceived to challenge state control over Chinese society, including shutdown of qigong clinics and hospitals, and banning groups such as Zhong Gong and Falun Gong. Since the crackdown, qigong research and practice have only been officially supported in the context of health functions and as a field of study within traditional Chinese medicine. The Chinese Health Qigong Association was established in 2000 to regulate public qigong practice, restricting the number of people that could gather at a time, requiring state approved training and certification of instructors, limiting practice to four standardized forms of daoyin from the classical medical tradition, and encouraging other types of recreation and exercise such as yoga, tai chi, senior disco dancing, and exercise machines.

== Spread of qigong ==
Migration, travel, and exploration contributed to the spread of qigong practice beyond the Chinese community. Western societies first encountered qigong concepts through exposure to traditional Chinese medicine, Chinese philosophy and the Chinese martial arts.

It was not until China opened up to the Western world with the visit of President Nixon in 1972 and the subsequent exchanges between China and the West that Western society became aware of qigong. The ideas of qigong were quickly embraced by alternative therapists. The idea of qi as a form of living energy also found a receptive audience within the New Age movement. When the Chinese qigong community started to report cases of paranormal activity, Western researchers in the field were also excited by those findings. Chinese findings were reviewed and various qigong practitioners were invited to the West to demonstrate those results.

The American public's first exposure to qigong was in the PBS series Healing and the Mind with Bill Moyers in 1993. In the documentary, Moyers provided an in-depth look at alternatives to Western medicine and introduced the audience to traditional Chinese medicine, acupuncture, and qigong. As a result, qigong practice spread to the general public in the US.

== Contemporary qigong ==
Historically, the effect of qigong practice has always been subjective. It ranges from feelings of calm, peace, and well-being to cure of chronic medical conditions. Throughout history, remarkable claims have been made about results of qigong practice. The journey towards self-enlightenment can include descriptions of out of body experiences and miraculous powers for both the Buddhist and the Taoist. For some individuals, qigong training is seen as providing a curative function after extensive training. For martial artists, qigong training is credited as the basis for developing extraordinary powers such as the ability to withstand blows and the ability to break hard objects.

In the early 1980s, the Chinese scientific community attempted to verify the principles of qi through external measurements. Initially, they reported great success suggesting that qi can be measured as a form of electrical magnetic radiation. Other reports indicates that qi can induce external effects such as changing the properties of a liquid, clairvoyance, and telekinesis. Those reports created great excitement within the paranormal and para psychological research communities.

However, those reports were severely criticized by the conventional scientific community both within China and outside of China. The main criticism from the conventional scientific establishment about qigong research is the lack of application of the principles of the scientific method notably the absence of scientific rigor, the small sample sizes, the uncontrolled testing environment and lack of reproducibility. In addition to those criticisms, the public acceptance of paranormal properties arising from qigong practice contributed to social unrest.

As a result of those controversies, the emphasis on qigong research within Mainland China has changed from externally verifying the existence of qi to focus on effects on health and as a component of Traditional Chinese Medicine without any reference to other aspects of traditional qigong practice.

Today, millions of people worldwide practice qigong. Similar to its historical origin, those interested in qigong come from diverse backgrounds and practice it for diverse reasons, including for exercise, recreation, preventative medicine, self-healing, self-cultivation, meditation, and martial arts training. This was highlighted in the 1998 documentary titled, "Qigong - Ancient Chinese Healing for the 21st Century" by Francesco Garri Garripoli which aired on PBS-TV seen by over 88 million Nielsen-certified viewers.
