= Chinese National Liberation Vanguard =

Chinese youth organization of the 1930s

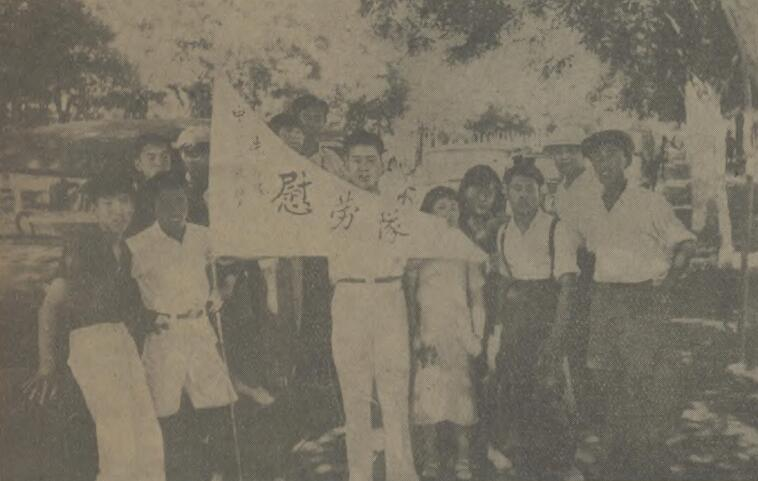
Members of the Chinese National Liberation Vanguard go to hospital to raise morale, 1937

The Chinese National Liberation Vanguard (Chinese: 中华民族解放先锋队), known in its abbreviation as "Minxian" (Chinese: 民先), was a youth organization created with the help of the Chinese Communist Party to broaden anti-Japanese alliance in the 1930s. The organization laid the foundation for both the National Salvation Youth Corps (Chinese: 青年救国会), and later the Communist Youth League of China.

== History ==
The founding of the Chinese National Liberation Vanguard was first proposed by the Chinese Communist Party on November 1, 1935, to broaden the anti-Japanese alliance during World War II. The Central Committee issued the document, "A Decision concerning the Work of the Youth" (关于青年工作的决定), which effectively expanded the Communist Youth League (founded in 1920) into a more inclusive, nation-wide youth organization. The League was officially established in Beiping on February 1, 1936 after the December 9th Movement. The "Declaration of the Founding of the Chinese National Liberation Vanguard" begins with, "The crisis facing the Chinese nation has come to its pivotal moment!" and proceeds to call for youth participation in the Second Sino-Japanese War.

== Notable members ==
The League was led for a while by Li Chang. The prominent scientist Qian Weichang, Tsinghua University president Jiang Nanxiang, economist Yu Guangyuan and Qian Jiaju were all early organizers of the League. Zhao Lin, later secretary of the CCP committee in Jilin, operated for a time at the National Liberation Vanguard in Taiyuan.
