= Yu Guangyuan =

Chinese economist

Yu Guangyuan 于光遠
- Born: 5 July 1915; Shanghai, Republic of China
- Died: 26 September 2013 (aged 98); Beijing, People's Republic of China
- Education: Tsinghua University
- Known for: Market economic reform in China, Marxism
- Scientific career
- Fields: Economics, philosophy, physics
- Workplaces: Chinese Academy of Social Sciences
- Notable students: Wu Jinglian, Chen Yuan, Yang Xiaokai

Yu Guangyuan (Chinese: 于光遠; pinyin: Yú Guāngyuǎn; born as 郁鐘正; pinyin: Yù Zhōngzhèng; 5 July 1915 – 23 September 2013) was a Chinese economist, philosopher, and a senior official of the People's Republic of China. Yu was recognized as one of the first proponents of the reform and opening up in China and the theory of "the Primary Stage of Socialism". He was a close adviser of and speech-writer for the Chinese leader Deng Xiaoping.

Yu was a senior member of the Political Research Office of the State Council, a deputy president of the Chinese Academy of Social Sciences and a deputy director of the State Science and Technology Commission of the State Council.

== Early life ==
Yu Guangyuan was born on 5 July 1915 in Shanghai, three years after the founding of the Republic of China. The Yu (郁) family, with kinship ties to powerful government officials, intellectuals, and businessmen of the Qing Dynasty across China including the "red-topped hat" merchant Hu Xueyan, prospered from maritime trade and banking in the mid-19th century, reaching its zenith during the Daoguang reign. Reluctant association with the Small Swords Society in 1851, when the Rebels converted the Yu Family's courtyard and the Yu Garden as their two headquarters, led to blackmailing from the Qing government after the Xianfeng court quelled the rebellion, which further aggravated economic woes of the family. Since the Tongzhi period, the family's "sand-shipping" business steadily declined, under pressure from more advanced ships. Yu Guangyuan's maternal uncle is the late Qing and early Republican politician Cao Rulin, who is said to have predicted Yu's illustrious future while holding the infant in his arms. Yu's father, trained in chemical engineering, served briefly in the Republican government during Yuan Shikai's presidency.

Yu attended Shanghai Datong High School and Utopia University before enrolling at the Department of Physics at Tsinghua University in Beijing, where he studied theoretical physics under the physicist Zhou Peiyuan, who showed Yu's dissertation to Albert Einstein at the Institute for Advanced Study for comments and corrections. His classmates at Tsinghua included nuclear physicists Qian Sanqiang (Tsien San-Tsiang) and He Zehui (Ho Zah-wei), as well as the optical physicist and "father of Chinese optical engineering" Wang Daheng. Yu graduated from Tsinghua in 1936. Yu and his classmate Qian Sanqiang both applied for a position at Frédéric Joliot-Curie and Irène Joliot-Curie's laboratory. However, when Yu was drawn to the December 9th Movement, he and Qian agreed that Qian should pursue a career in scientific research, whereas Yu should join the revolution. He emerged as a prominent student leader in the December 9th movement (1935) and organized the National Liberation Pioneers (Minxian: 民先) to broaden the anti-Japanese alliance. On the eve of Japanese invasion of China in 1937, Yu joined the Chinese Communist Party. Upon this occasion, he dropped the original family name (郁) and adopted his later name Yu Guangyuan (于光遠). His unfinished thesis on general relativity was later completed by his fellow student, Tsinghua physicist Peng Huanwu in 1997.

== World War II ==
Yu became an early organizer, along with Li Chang, Qian Weichang and Qian Jiaju, of the Chinese National Liberation Vanguard (Minxian) upon the organization's founding in 1936. The organisation emerged in the aftermath of the December 9th Movement. Many of its early advocates and participants went on to become revolutionary leaders and public officials of the People's Republic of China, including Huang Jing, Yao Yilin, Xiong Xianghui, and Xu Jiatun. The league underwent a period of transition under their leadership, which laid the foundation of the Youth League of the Communist Party.

Yu Guangyuan, along with Ai Siqi and Zhang Hanfu (章漢夫), organised the "Society for Natural Philosophy" (自然哲學研究會). Yu later taught physics at Lingnan University (嶺南大學) in Guangzhou, an institution which later split into the Lingnan University in Hong Kong and the Sun Yat-sen University in Guangzhou, Guangdong. During this time, he remained a leader of Minxian. In February 1937, Yu returned to Beijing, and led the Minxian movement in its headquarter.

After the Marco Polo Bridge Incident, Yu organised students movements in Kuomintang-controlled areas in Baoding, Shijiazhuang, Taiyuan, Wuhan, western Hebei, Changsha, Nanchang, and northern Guangdong. He was appointed the Secretary for Youth Work in the early Chinese Communist Party's Yangtse River Bureau (長江局), which later morphed into the Southern Bureau (南方局).

In 1939, Yu was summoned to Yan'an. He translated Engels's Dialectics of Nature (Dialektik der Natur) from German to Chinese while riding a donkey to Yan'an. On his way, he ran into a group of marching Japanese tanks, where he narrowly survived and escaped. In Yan'an, Yu preoccupied himself with the economics of agriculture. A trained physicist, Yu took extensive field trips to Mizhi and Suide counties, and published a book on land and agriculture in northern Shaanxi (republished in 1979). He was for a while the Director of the Yan'an Library (延安圖書館), and was involved in the founding and teaching of the renowned Counter-Japanese Military and Political University (抗日軍政大學). Along with Chen Boda and Tian Jiaying, Yu also tutored Mao Zedong's son, Mao Anying in Chinese history and classical Chinese literature.

In the early 1940s, Yu organised the "Shaan-Gan-Ning Border Region Society for the Natural Sciences" (陝甘寧邊區自然科學研究會). In 1946, Yu was sent to found the Liberation (解放) newspaper. After the Chongqing Negotiations failed to reunite China peacefully, Yu returned to Yan'an and became the deputy-editor-in-chief of the "Opinions" (言論) section of the Liberation Daily (解放日報). Since March, 1947, Yu led the Land Reforms in the Jinsui (晉綏) regions, Hebei, and Shandong. In 1948, Yu Guangyuan, Mao Anying, Wu Jianxun (吳劍迅), Shi Jingtang (史敬棠) led the historic Zhangjiaji Land Reform (張家集土改) in the Bohai area of Shandong.

== Career in the People's Republic of China ==
In 1954, Yu was elected Fellow of the Chinese Academy of Sciences. In 1964, he served as the Executive Deputy Chair of the State Science and Technology Commission (国家科学技术委员会) under the directorship of Nie Rongzhen. The Commission has been succeeded by the Ministry of Science and Technology (MOST) since 1998.

During the Cultural Revolution, Yu was struggled against, deprived of his posts and rights to write and publish, and sent to the May 7th Cadre School in Ningxia. His memoirs of this era has proved a main primary source for historians.

In 1975 Yu was assigned as a senior member of the Party Research Office of the State Council, and later of the Political Research Office (predecessor of Central Policy Research Office), along with Hu Qiaomu, Wu Lengxi, Hu Sheng, Xiong Fu, Li Xin and Deng Liqun. He served concurrently as the Deputy President of the Chinese Academy of Social Sciences, Deputy Director of the State Science and Technology Commission of the State Council, and the Director of Economic Research at the State Planning Commission (國家計劃委員會), which has since evolved into the National Development and Reform Commission.

During the Third Plenary Session, Yu participated in the Northwestern Group along with other 34 attendees, including Xu Xiangqian and Hu Yaobang. Yu's criticism of the Two Whatevers camp of Wang Dongxing, Wu De, Chen Xilian and Ji Dengkui gained momentum in the conference, leading to the downfall of many Hua Guofeng allies in the aftermath of the conference.

Yu worked closely with Deng Xiaoping before and during Deng’s periods of ascendancy, and drafted the reformist leader's landmark speech "Liberate Thought, Seek Truth from Facts, and Unite to Look Forward" at the Third Plenary Session. Yu was a "major author of the whole concept" of Socialism with Chinese characteristics. Yu was a key ally and personal friend of Hu Yaobang.

Active in economic policy, Yu contributed to Deng's plan to develop Shenzhen as a special economic zone. He proposed to loosen and facilitate borders control between Hong Kong and Shenzhen to boost economic activity and foreign trade in 1978. The next year, he worked with the libera-minded Xi Zhongxun, father of Xi Jinping, on the development of Shekou. In the early 1980s, he worked with his personal friend and close ally Ren Zhongyi, then First Secretary of Guangdong, to launch market reforms in the economy of Guangdong. In the 1980s-90s, he turned similar attention to Hainan, envisioning as a future economic hub in the island-province.

Yu played a prominent role in opposing the Qigong fever and related superstitions during the 1980s and 1990s. He opposed groups like Falun Gong for their extraordinary claims and labelled them as unscientific pseudoscience. In a July 1981 speech, he stated: "we should stop any ESP-related antiscience propaganda". (Note: ESP refers to "extrasensory perception".) By the late 1990s, his position had emerged victorious resulting in a state crackdown on Falun Gong.

== Legacies ==
=== Foundations of political economy ===
In the 1960s, he authored and edited the "Political Economy Reader" with Su Xing and Gu Zhun, which served for decades as the standard economics textbook in China. The young Wu Jinglian was his research assistant in the writing project. Since the late 1970s, Yu proposed that commodity economy and market economy are compatible with socialism, a process of which China still remained on the initial stage. Supported by Deng Xiaoping, he was also one of the leading voices in a public debate over the measurement of truth in relation to politics. Yu also wrote extensively on the economics of education, games, leisure and entertainment.

=== "Look Forward" v. "Look to Money" ===
In the making of Chinese economic policies in the 1980s, Yu advocated for adding to the slogan "Look Forward" (向前看) that of "Look to Money" (向钱看), the latter a homophonic pun on the former, both pronounced "Xiang Qian Kan." Once in the presence of an assembly of high-level officials and scholars gathered to criticise his economic thoughts, Yu affirmed that the pursuit of self-interest in the free market is central to the developing a successful commercial economy, that to focus on profit only and to denounce the pursuit of profit are equally undesirable, and that "it is by 'looking to money' that one could 'look ahead.'" This glaring rhetoric, for a long time subject to criticism from the more conservative Marxists, became the banner under which contemporary and later generations of economists make the case for reform.

=== Environmental thought ===
In 1996, Yu Guangyuan wrote a seminal text entitled “The Smallness of the Earth and the Largeness of the Earth,” in which he proposed the “grand exploitation of the earth along with its grand protection.” The “smallness” of the earth alluded to an environmental concern of its time: the earth was to be protected, on which the survival of humankind depends. By the “largeness of the earth,” Yu referred to the rich resources yet to be exploited, but that the success of their use “depends on our calculation and speculation on its profitability.” Over the decades of Deng Xiaoping’s market reforms, Yu developed this environmental rhetoric, binding production and ecology together by framing environmental protection as a form of productive labour. Fresh air and clean water have, in this sense, become products of labor, where quantitatively calculating the positive and negative effects of industry can inform future decisions in making better use of labour in damaged environments. Within this line of thinking, high levels of pollution can, for example, dictate the expulsion of heavy industries out of a city’s periphery, and millions of labourers can be organised to plant forests battling growing deserts. What such labour brings can be calculated to benefit the economy, whereby fixing these damages and industrial after-effects can further stimulate the movement of capital and labor. Yu’s vision had presented the earth as a holistic image while being an object of scientific construction. It was a logic of governance claiming that, if accurately calculated, the entirety of the planet can be exploited, and its negative effects reverse-engineered through further labour.

Yu's vision influenced the later Digital Belt and Road (DBAR) project at the Chinese Academy of Sciences, developed in consultation with former US vice president, Al Gore. The project is also inspired by Gore’s 1998 speech in which he made a claim for a “‘Digital Earth’: a multi-resolution, three-dimensional virtual representation of the planet into which vast quantities of geo-referenced data can be embedded.” The idea is that contemporary problems surrounding the climate crisis can translate into issues of communication: communication of scientific knowledge around how the earth is changing; between “facts” and our understanding; and structurally, the communication between technical providers and decision makers, with the growing need for political offices being able to communicate with each other. “Digital Earth is another way to understand the world. Everything can be changed into data, to simulate precisely and to try and understand what the problems are that our society faces.”

=== Political and economic reform ===
In 1997, prominent reformists in China, led by Yu Guangyuan, Ren Zhongyi, Gong Yuzhi, Li Rui, and Wu Xiang, voiced their strong commitment to both economic and political reforms, warned against the return of ultra-leftism in China, and envisioned a "Third Thought Liberation".

=== Memoirs ===
Yu was a prolific author of memoirs that have become primary historical sources, such as his account of personal experiences in the Cultural Revolution. "You don't want to forget the past. To forget the past is to lose control over the future," he wrote in the foreword to his 1995 work, The Cultural Revolution and Myself. Also among them is the only available, comprehensive eyewitness account of the Third Plenum. Harvard Sociologist Ezra Vogel says in the introductory remark of the English translation:

“…Thanks to Yu’s account, we now understand the nature of the Party Work Conference and the drama that took place there. Until Yu’s book appeared, it was possible for Western scholars to argue that the turning point in reform and opening was at the Third Plenum of December 1978. We now know that the key debates were held at the 34-day Party Work Conference … and that the Third Plenum which followed immediately was essentially ceremonial, officially approving the new consensus worked out at the Party Work Conference.”

== Miscellanies ==
A long-time advocate for games, economics of game, game theory, and leisure economics, Yu helped founded the World Mahjong Organization (WMO) and was elected its first president in 2006. At the conference in the following year, it was decided that the World Mahjong Championship (WMC) is to be held every two years and that Chinese, English and Japanese are the official languages of the WMO. Yu has been described as one of mahjong's "most stalwart defenders." The game had been for a long time denigrated as decadent 'bourgeois culture' in mainland China, especially during the Cultural Revolution. Yu played an instrumental role in recovering its reputation since the country's market reforms. "It is the fault of people that they use mahjong to gamble," he says, "not the fault of the game."

== Publications ==
=== English ===
- Yu Guangyuan. Collected Works of Yu Guangyuan (Routledge Studies on the Chinese Economy). London: Routledge, 2013
- Yu Guangyuan. Edited by Ezra F. Vogel and Steven I. Levin. Deng Xiaoping Shakes the World: An Eyewitness Account of China's Party Work Conference and the Third Plenum (November–December 1978) (Voices of Asia). Norwalk: EastBridge Books, 2004.
- Yu Guangyuan (editor). China's Socialist Modernization. Beijing: Foreign Language Press, 1984.
- Yu Guangyuan. Translated by Tang, Bowen; Zhao, Shuhan. On the Objective Character of Laws of Development--the Objective Laws of Development and the Human Will. Beijing: Chinese Academy of Social Sciences, 1982.

=== French ===
- Yu Guangyuan. Marxism et socialism I.M.L.M.Z, 1983.
- Yu Guangyuan. Modernisation socialiste de la Chine Tome I Editions en langues étrangère, 1983.
- Yu Guangyuan. Modernisation socialiste de la Chine Tome II Editions en langues étrangère, 1983.

=== Chinese ===
==== Economics ====
- 《政治經濟學——資本主義部分》于光遠、蘇星，人民出版社（1978）
- 《社會主義市場經濟主體論》中國財政經濟出版社（1992）
- 《我的市場經濟觀》黑龍江教育出版社（1993）
- 《政治經濟學——社會主義部分探索（共七卷）》人民出版社（1984-2001）
- 《經濟改革雜談》生活·读书·新知三联书店（1996）
- 《从“新民主主義社會論”到“社會主義初級階段論”》人民出版社（1996）
- 《于光遠短論集》(1977-2001共4卷)華東師範大學出版社（2001）
- 《于光遠經濟學文選》經濟科學出版社（2001）
- 《于光遠改革論集》中國發展出版社（2008）
- 《于光遠經濟文選》中國時代經濟出版社（2010）
- 《經濟學問題的哲學探析》科學出版社（2013）
- 《于光遠經濟論著全集》（全集共75本）知識產權出版社（2015）

==== Social theory ====
- 《“新民主主義社會論”的歷史命運》(韓鋼詮注)長江文藝出版社（2005）

==== Philosophy ====
- 《中國的科學技術哲學——自然辯證法》科學出版社（2013）
- 《一個哲學學派正在中國興起》江西科學技術出版社（1996）
- 《自然辯證法百科全書》中國大百科全書出版社（1995）
- 《现代公民知识读本|現代公民知識讀本》(名譽主編)希望出版社（2006）
- 《哲學論文、演講和筆記,1950-1966》人民出版社（1982）

==== Education, pedagogy, and methodology ====
- 《怎樣進行調查研究》中國青年出版社（1981）
- 《論社會科學研究》（1981）
- 《教育思想文選》湖南教育出版社（1989）
- 《我的教育思想》河南教育出版社（1991）
- 《于光遠馬惠娣十年對話:關於休閒學研究的基本問題》重慶大學出版社（2008）

==== Edited translations ====
- 《勞動在從猿到人轉變過程中的作用》Friedrich Engels, translated by Yu Guangyuan, Cao Baohua. 人民出版社（1949）
- 《自然辯證法》(Natural Dialectics) Friedrich Engels, translated by Yu Guangyuan et al. 人民出版社（1984）

==== Essays and memoirs ====
- 《古稀手跡》中國華僑出版社（1993）
- 《窗外的石榴花》作家出版社（1997）
- 《酒啦集》湖南文藝（1998）
- 《東方赤子．大家叢書：于光遠卷》華文出版社（1999）
- 《細雨集》重慶出版社（2003）
- 《碎思錄》重慶出版社（2003）
- 《青少年于光遠》華東師範大學（2003）
- 《我是于光遠》中國時代經濟出版社（2003）
- 《我的編年故事》大象出版社（2005）
- 《于光遠自述》大象出版社（2005）
- 《我眼中的他們》時代國際出版有限公司（2005）
- 《我憶鄧小平》時代國際出版有限公司（2005）
- 《我親歷的那次歷史大轉折》中央編譯局（2008）
- 《文革中的我》廣東人民出版社（2011）

==== Speechwriting ====
- 《解放思想，實事求是，團結一致向前看》（speech drafted for Deng Xiaoping）

==== Books about Yu Guangyuan ====
- 《任仲夷點評于光遠超短文》Yu Guangyuan and Ren Zhongyi, 海天出版社（2000）
- 《改革黃金年代：我們眼中的于光遠》by Hu Jiyan, Yu Xiaodong, Liu Shiding, Han Gang. 人民出版社（2016）

== Documentary ==
- "Laoma Sifeng: Yu Guangyuan" (老馬嘶風: 于光遠) in Shandong Radio and Television documentary series Shu Fengliu Renwu (數風流人物): Part I & Part II.
