= Guanlan Renmin Park =

Park in Shenzhen, China

- 观澜人民公园
- Location within Guangdong Location within China
- Type: Public park, urban park
- Location: Longhua District, Shenzhen, Guangdong, China
- Coordinates: 22°43′20″N 114°03′05″E
- Area: 163,000 square metres (1,750,000 sq ft)
- Created: 1993
- Operator: Shenzhen government
- Status: Open all year

Guanlan Renmin Park (simplified Chinese: 观澜人民公园; traditional Chinese: 觀瀾人民公園; pinyin: Guānlán Rénmín Gōngyuán) is a public, urban park in Longhua District, Shenzhen, Guangdong, China. Situated in Guanlan Subdistrict, the park is bordered by Meiguan Expressway (梅观高速公路) on the East, Bilan Road (碧澜路) on the West, Buxin Road (布新路) on the North, and Guanlan Park (观澜公园路) Road on the South. In 1993 the park was officially opened to the public. It covers an area of 163,000 square metres (1,750,000 sq ft), of which green area of 39,000 square metres (420,000 sq ft). The park is used for recreational activities, such as dancing, singing, walking, and gathering.

== Tourist attractions ==
=== Revolutionary Martyr Monument ===
The Revolutionary Martyr Monument was established in 1994 by the local government for honoring revolutionary martyrs. It is engraved with the words by Zeng Sheng, a military officer in the People's Liberation Army (PLA): "Eternal life to the revolutionary martyrs" (革命烈士永垂不朽).

=== Lansheng Tower ===
The Lansheng Tower (揽胜塔) is octagonal with five stories outside and four blindstories.

=== Linbo Cloak Bridge ===
The Linbo Cloak Bridge (临波桥廊) is a bridge cross the pound in the park.

=== Xiaoyao Pavilion ===
The Xiaoyao Pavilion (逍遥亭) is a Chinese pavilion in the park. Visitors can rest and shelter from its inside.

== Gallery ==
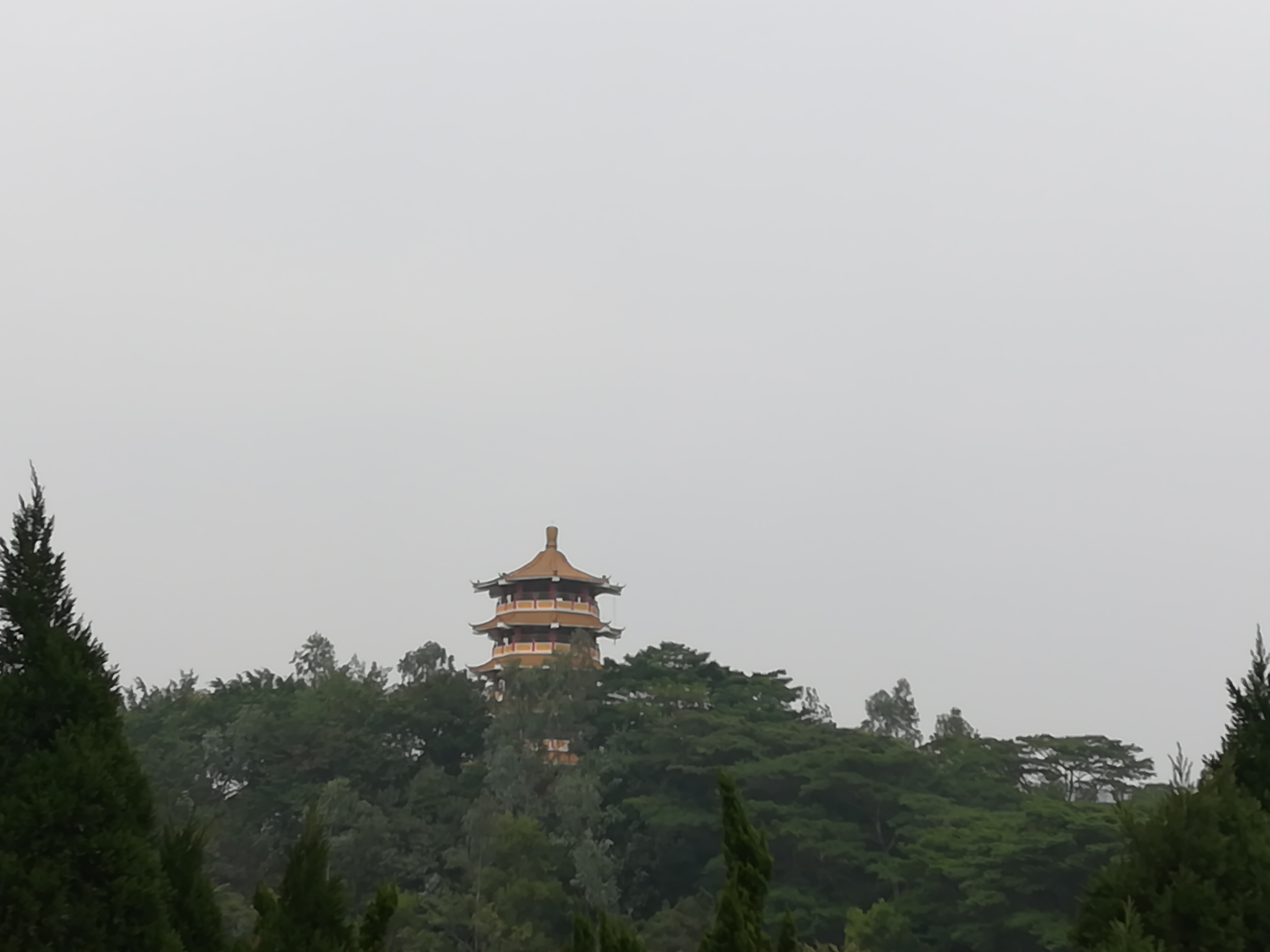
Lansheng Tower.

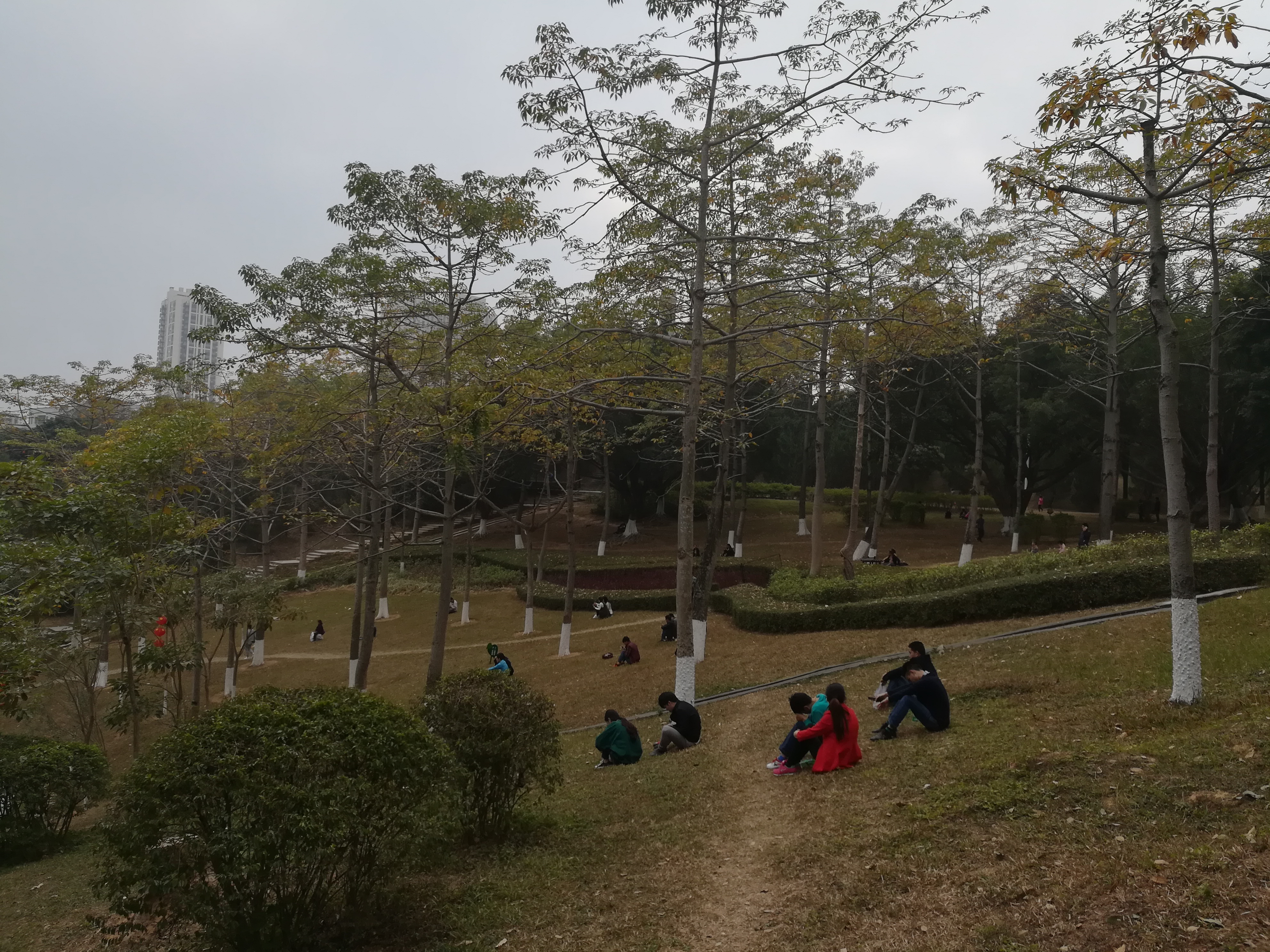
A grass slope in Guanlan Renmin Park

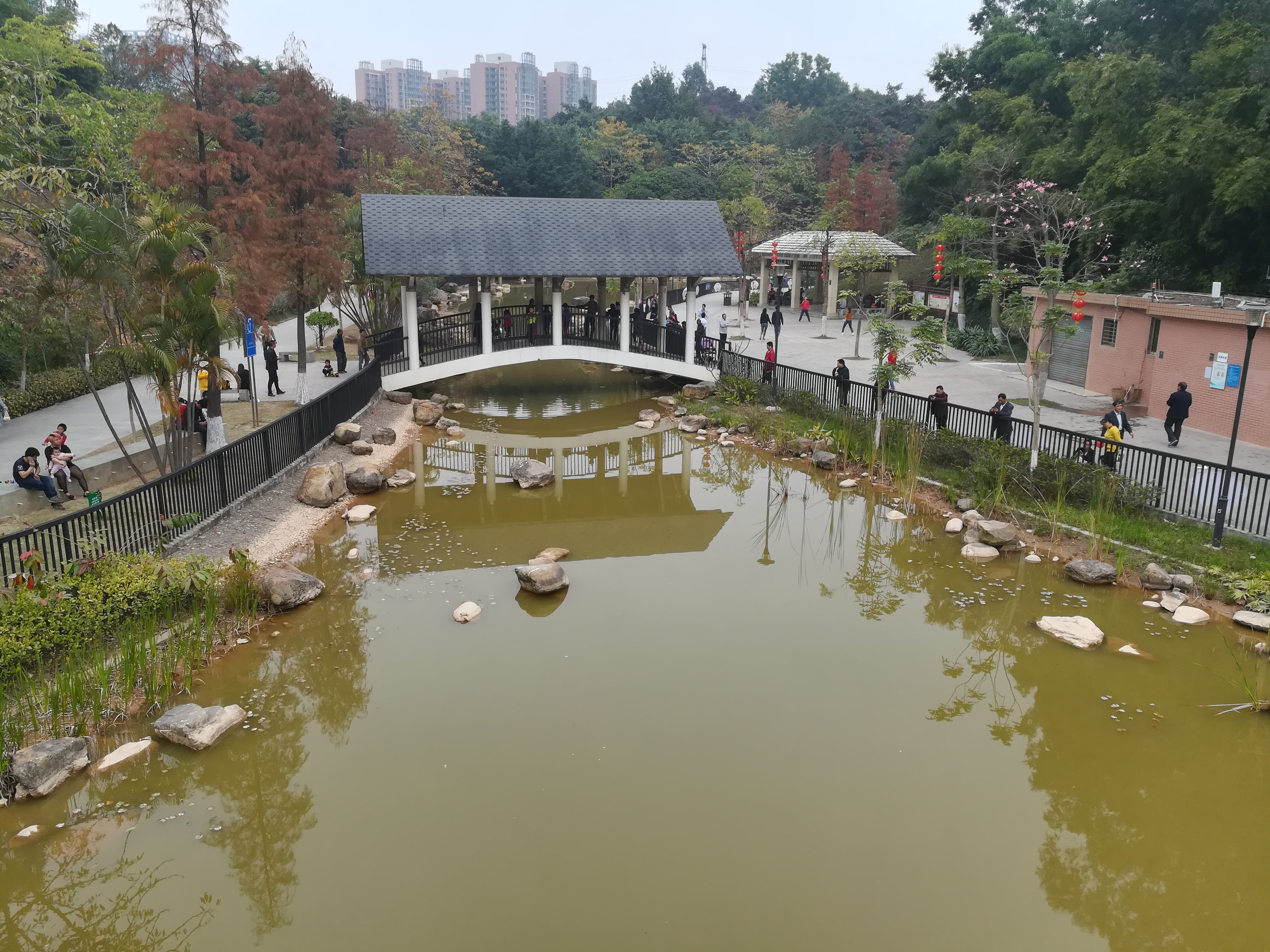
Linbo Cloak Bridge.
