= Strict rules, hard efforts =

Motto of Harbin Institute of Technology

"Strict rules, hard efforts" (Chinese: 规格严格，功夫到家; pinyin: Guīgé yángé, gōngfū dàojiā) is the official motto of Harbin Institute of Technology (HIT), located in Harbin, China. The motto is the Code of conduct of the university, which is well known for its emphasis on students' hard endeavor and strict standards. It is regarded by many HIT alumni as the essence of the education in HIT. The phrase "HIT rules" (Chinese: 哈工大规格) derives from the motto.

The motto stone was built in 2010 at Library Front, with the fund from HIT's alumni group in Shenyang.

== History ==
The motto was proposed by Li Chang, then principal of HIT in 1950s. Strict rules, hard efforts was adopted officially as motto of HIT in 2008.

== Media coverage ==
On 14 August 2014, the motto Strict rules, hard efforts was covered by China Central Television on a major morning news column, in which several HIT alumni were interviewed.
