= East River Column =

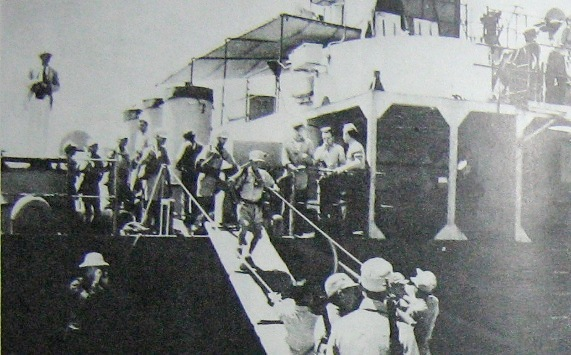
- Soldiers of the East River Column disembark from United States Navy vessels in Shandong, 1945.
- Founded: May 8, 1940
- Country: China
- Allegiance: Chinese Communist Party
- Type: Army Light Infantry
- Role: Guerilla warfare
- Size: 600 (1939) 6,000 (1941) 3,000 (1945)

Commanders
- Commander: Zeng Sheng
- Chief of Staff: Wang Zuorao
- Notable commanders: Liu Tianfu

The East River Column or Dongjiang Column (simplified Chinese: 东江纵队; traditional Chinese: 東江縱隊) was a unit of anti-Japanese Communist guerrillas that operated in Guangdong and Hong Kong during the Second Sino-Japanese War. They played a major role in Chinese resistance against Japanese occupation, and remain an important part of local historical traditions about the war and the subsequent Communist Revolution. They are also notable outside of China for being the only Chinese Communist unit transported on US Navy vessels, done as part of the peace negotiations led by the Marshall Mission.

== History ==
The East River Column had its origins in two separate units, the Dongguan Model Able-bodied Young Men Guerrilla Team and the Huiyang Bao'an People's Anti-Japanese Guerrillas. The former was founded in October 1938 by around thirty men led by Wang Zuorao. Wang was a Communist and National Revolutionary Army defector who had been organizing in Dongguan since January. The latter was created in November when CCP Southern Bureau Chief Liao Chengzhi ordered 60 men under Commander Zeng Sheng (Secretary-General of the Hong Kong Seamen's Union) and Political Commissar Zhou Boming (Hong Kong Propaganda Chief and former Northeastern Army officer) to begin guerrilla operations north of Shenzhen. The People's Guerrillas included the future war hero Yuan Geng. Both groups started with a core of educated radicals and militant members of the Seaman's Union but successfully focused their recruitment efforts on the peasantry. The two forces were merged in 1939. As part of the Second United Front policy, the guerrillas nominally served under the KMT's 4th War Area until March 1940, when local KMT General Xiang Hanping launched an attack on them for refusing to disband. The 108 survivors fled to Shishan.

The decision to flee eastward and away from the front lines against Japan was strongly criticized by CCP party leadership in Yan'an. In a message sent on May 8 but not received until June, Zhou Enlai ordered Zeng and Wang to return to the Pearl River Delta and resume operations against the Japanese. He also formally designated the unit as "the Guangdong People's Anti-Japanese Guerrillas East River Column". The guerrillas followed orders and returned westwards. When the war reached Hong Kong in 1941, the East River Column grew from a few hundred to more than 6,000 soldiers. (Note: Sources disagree on the exact size of the unit before the battle of Hong Kong. Chan places it at 500, while Courtauld, et al. cite a figure of 200.) New recruits were motivated by anger at KMT desertions in the lead-up to the battle, and often armed themselves with abandoned KMT weapons. For the next four years the East River Column mounted the only fortified resistance against the Japanese Occupation of Hong Kong. They killed Chinese collaborators, protected traders in Kowloon and Guangzhou, attacked the police station at Tai Po, and bombed Kai Tak Airport.

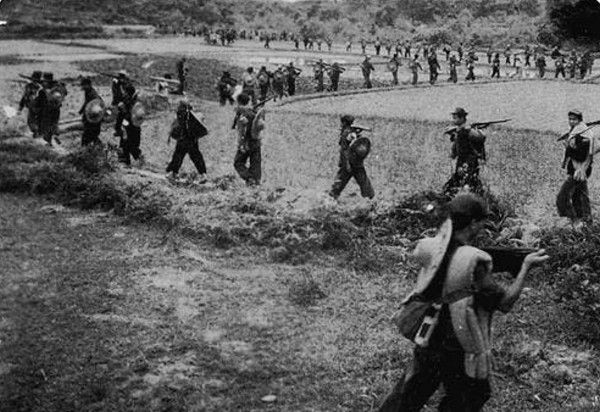
The East River Column on the march near Hong Kong, 1945.

The Hong Kong and Kowloon Independent Brigade of the East River Column was established on February 3, 1942, at the Rosary Mission Centre, a chapel in Sai Kung, Hong Kong. Commander Choi Kwok-Leung and Political Commissar Chan Tat-Ming led a force of about 400 men armed with 30 machine guns and several hundred rifles left by defeated British forces. The guerrillas rescued around twenty to twenty-five Allied pilots who parachuted into Kowloon when their planes were shot down by the Japanese, including Sir Lindsay Ride and Sir Douglas Clague. In December 1943 the East River guerillas absorbed the HK-Kowloon Brigade into the larger unit. In 1943 the East River Column was engaged in a multi-sided war against the Japanese, the KMT's 187th Division, KMT-aligned bandits, and units of Wang Jingwei's collaborationist regime. Despite this strong opposition, by 1944 they controlled a significant amount of territory known as the Guangdong Base Area, from Huiyang in the east to Sanshui and Xinhui in the west.

When Japan surrendered on 15 August 1945, Zhu De ordered Commander-in-Chief Yasuji Okamura of the China Expeditionary Army to surrender to Zeng and the East River Column. This was ignored at the behest of the United States and Chiang Kai-shek, and Japanese troops remained in position until relieved by non-Communist forces. The Nationalists failed to dislodge the 3,000 guerrillas of the East River Column with an encirclement campaign, which included the New 1st Army, New Sixth Army, Forty-fifth, Sixty-third, Sixty-fourth, and Sixty-fifth Armies. The Communists continued to successfully harass Nationalist units moving along the Kowloon-Canton and Chaochow-Swatow Railways. The resulting stalemate was resolved when the Americans, who was at the time were hoping to broker a peace in China via the Marshall Mission, offered to transport the East River Column to Communist-held Yantai in Shandong. After lengthy negotiations, both sides agreed, and the Column was loaded onto US Navy vessels and escorted by the USS George to Shandong. This was the only time when the US Navy transported Chinese Communist soldiers. On 1 August 1947 the East River Column was reorganized and designated as the Guangdong-Guangxi Column of Chen Yi's East China Field Army.

== Legacy ==
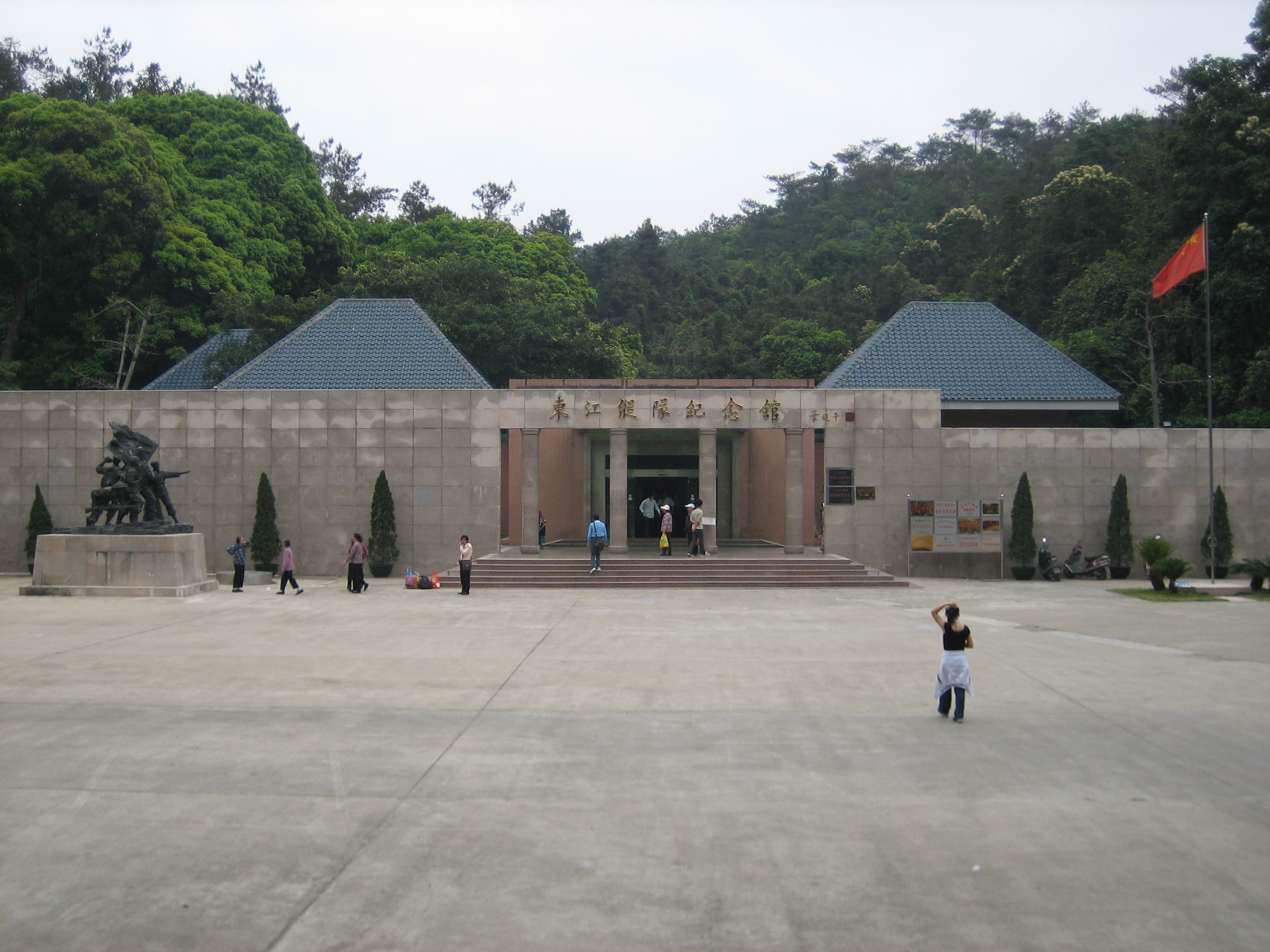
Part of the East River Column Memorial Hall in Dongguan, Guangdong.

After the war and the Chinese Communist Revolution, the East River Column became part of the revolutionary legend in Hong Kong and Guangdong. It was featured in the 1997 adventure novel Music on the Bamboo Radio by Martin Booth, and the award-winning New Wave film Our Time Will Come directed by Ann Hui. The Guangdong Memorial Hall of the East River Column was built to preserve the history of the unit, and exhibits of related artefacts feature prominently in other local museums. In 1998, Chief Executive Tung Chee-hwa added the names of the members of the HK-Kowloon Brigade to the memorial shrine at Hong Kong City Hall.

== See also ==
- New Fourth Army
- Eighth Route Army

== Bibliography ==
- Tsang, Steve (2007). A Modern History of Hong Kong. Hong Kong: I.B.Tauris Publishing. ISBN 1-84511-419-1.
- Chen, Daming (2000). Hong Kong's Anti-Japanese Guerrilla Force. Hong Kong: Universal Press.
- Ho, Kan-chih (1977). A History of the Modern Chinese Revolution (1919-1956) (PDF). Calcutta: Manika Barua Books and Periodicals.
- Courtauld, Caroline; Holdsworth, May; Vickers, Simon (1997). The Hong Kong Story. Oxford University Press. ISBN 0-19-590353-6.
- Houchins, Lee Stretton (1971). American Naval Involvement in the Chinese Civil War, 1945-149 (Thesis). American University.
- Chan, Sui-jeung (2009). East River Column: Hong Kong Guerrillas in the Second World War and After. Hong Kong University Press. ISBN 9789622098503.
