= The American (2010 film) =

2010 film by Anton Corbijn

- Theatrical release poster
- Directed by: Anton Corbijn
- Screenplay by: Rowan Joffé
- Based on: A Very Private Gentleman by Martin Booth
- Produced by: Anne Carey; Jill Green; Ann Wingate; Grant Heslov; George Clooney
- Starring: George Clooney; Violante Placido; Thekla Reuten; Paolo Bonacelli
- Cinematography: Martin Ruhe
- Edited by: Andrew Hulme
- Music by: Herbert Grönemeyer
- Production companies: This is that Smokehouse Pictures; Greenlit
- Distributed by: Focus Features
- Release date: September 1, 2010
- Running time: 105 minutes
- Country: United States
- Languages: English; Italian
- Budget: $20 million
- Box office: $67.9 million

The American is a 2010 American crime thriller film directed by Anton Corbijn and starring George Clooney, Thekla Reuten, Violante Placido, Irina Björklund, and Paolo Bonacelli. Based on the 1990 novel A Very Private Gentleman by Martin Booth, it was loosely adapted to screenplay by Rowan Joffé. The film was released on September 1, 2010. It received generally positive reviews from critics and grossed $67 million worldwide.

== Plot ==
Jack and his lover, Ingrid, are relaxing in Sweden. As they walk in the wilderness outside their cabin, Jack becomes alarmed by a trail of footprints in the snow. A sniper's shots ring out, but Ingrid sees Jack pull a gun from his pocket and shoot the sniper; without hesitation, he kills her too before locating and killing another armed man. He flees to Rome and contacts a man named Pavel, who insists that Jack cannot stay in Rome and sends him to Castelvecchio, a small town in the mountains of Abruzzo. A nervous Jack disposes of the cell phone, which Pavel gave him, and goes to nearby Castel del Monte instead, where he goes by the name of Edward.

While in Abruzzo, Jack contacts Pavel, who sets him up with a job. He meets a woman named Mathilde, who wants him to build her a custom sniper rifle. A local priest named Father Benedetto takes notice of Jack, and befriends him. Jack also begins soliciting a local prostitute named Clara, and they start a relationship.

In the meantime, Jack suspects that he's being followed by a man, but still meets with Mathilde in a secluded river area to test the weapon. Although impressed by the craftsmanship, she asks Jack to make a few more adjustments and provide specific types of ammunition before they complete their transaction.

Later, the man follows Jack, planning on killing him. Realising he is being tailed, Jack doubles back, getting behind the man, and prepares to kill him. However, a motorbike enters the lane where Jack and the man are standing right as Jack goes to shoot the would-be assassin. The assassin shoots the motorist instead, and flees in a car. Jack pursues him through the town on the bike, eventually shooting out a tire on his car, causing him to crash, before approaching the car and killing him.

The next day, Benedetto asks Jack if he has anything to confess. Although he is tormented by dreams of the events in Sweden and has regrets for killing Ingrid, Jack shares nothing. When Benedetto says that he senses Jack lives in a special kind of hell, "a place without love", Jack starts to let himself feel love for Clara and envisions a life with her.

Jack calls Pavel to ask how the Swedes found him, and Pavel tells Jack that he's losing his edge. In his growing fear, he even suspects Clara when he discovers a small pistol in her purse. They go on a picnic to the secluded river, where Jack prepares to kill Clara. But when she does not try to kill him, Jack begins to trust her and agrees to meet with her later back in town.

Finally, Jack agrees to deliver the completed weapon and ammunition to Mathilde as his last job, but at the last moment, he re-opens the briefcase he has stored it in and makes some adjustments to the weapon. During the drop-off, Jack becomes suspicious that Mathilde plans to kill him, but a busload of schoolchildren arrive, preventing a confrontation. Mathilde gives Jack a padded envelope of cash before they separate. As she drives away, Pavel contacts her and asks if she has killed Jack. She tells him she has not but says she is following him.

Clara then meets Jack at a religious procession in town. Jack asks her to go away with him and she agrees. While they embrace, Mathilde attempts to shoot Jack from a nearby rooftop with the rifle but it backfires in her face due to the earlier sabotaging adjustments Jack had made. Seeing Mathilde fall from the roof, Jack gives Clara the envelope and tells her to wait for him at the river. He runs to a dying Mathilde, who reveals that she also works for Pavel.

As Jack leaves to rendezvous with Clara, Pavel arrives to finish Mathilde's failed assassination. Jack spins around and kills Pavel as they exchange gunfire. As Jack drives to meet Clara, he feels his abdomen and it becomes clear that he has been shot. He arrives at the picnic spot; seeing Clara waiting for him, he collapses behind the wheel of his car.

== Cast ==
- George Clooney as Jack/Edward
- Violante Placido as Clara
- Thekla Reuten as Mathilde
- Paolo Bonacelli as Father Benedetto
- Patrizio Pelizzi as Antonio
- Irina Björklund as Ingrid
- Johan Leysen as Pavel
- Filippo Timi as Fabio
- Anna Foglietta as Anna
- Björn Granath as the Swedish Assassin

== Production ==
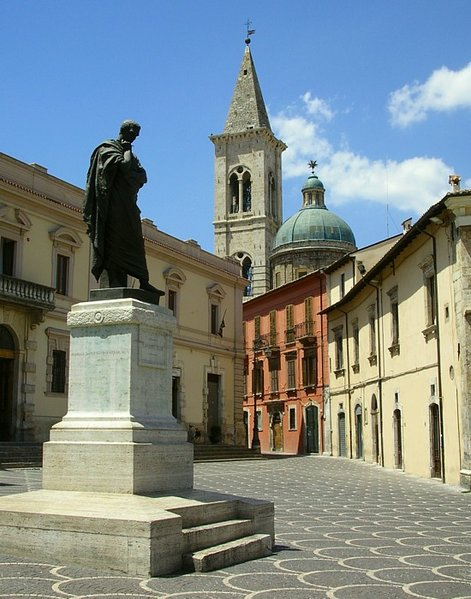
View of Sulmona in Abruzzo, Italian set of the film

Filming began in September 2009 and took place in Castel del Monte, Sulmona, Castelvecchio Calvisio, Calascio and Campo Imperatore in the Province of L'Aquila (Abruzzo); in Rome, and in Östersund, Jämtland and other locations. As the Clooney character drives from Rome to Castel del Monte, there is an impressively long drive through the 4600-meter long San Domenico Tunnel (Galleria San Domenico) that is between the exits of Pescina and Cocullo on the A25 highway that connects Rome to Torano and Pescara. The car driven by Jack in the movie is a Fiat Tempra with Pescara licence plates.

The film's "most romantic moment", according to director Anton Corbijn—when Jack takes Clara to a restaurant of her choice, their "actual date"—was filmed at a restaurant in Pacentro, near Sulmona. The comic-acting waiter in this restaurant scene was directed to stand in front of a two-bulb lamp fixture so that he appeared to have "devil's horns". Photographs on the restaurant's walls are reportedly all of the lovers of Gabriele D'Annunzio. Clara orders Montepulciano d'Abruzzo wine for the dinner, and Corbijn said the film's company enjoyed many of the fine wines of the region during the months of production there.

The film score was written and composed by German singer-songwriter (and longtime friend of Corbijn) Herbert Grönemeyer. A 1967 song called "Window of My Eyes" by the Dutch blues band Cuby + Blizzards is played over the ending credits. The aria "Un bel dì, vedremo" ("One fine day we'll see") from Puccini's opera Madama Butterfly can be heard in the background of one scene, and "Tu vuò fà l'americano" in another. In another scene, the Italian song "La bambola" by Patty Pravo plays.

=== Western films and other influences ===
Once Upon a Time in the West (1968), with Henry Fonda facing off as a villain in a gunfight, is playing on television on the back wall of a modest restaurant where Jack has been eating. In the DVD commentary, Corbijn notes this homage and says the American Western—and more specifically the Italian-American Spaghetti Westerns by Leone and others—were explicit models for The American. Corbijn also notes the Ennio Morricone scores made famous in Once Upon a Time in the West, The Good, the Bad and the Ugly (1966), and other films. Speaking of the narrow, labyrinthine streets of the Italian hill towns where much of the action of The American occurs, Corbijn says he was thinking, in filming, of the streets of Venice and the way they appeared in Nicolas Roeg's Don't Look Now (1973). The American follows closely the narrative strategies and character profiles of "The Day of the Jackal" (1973).

Parts of the dialogue between Jack and Clara are taken verbatim from Graham Greene's novel The Honorary Consul (1973).

== Release ==
=== Marketing ===
The first official poster was released on June 17, 2010. The first trailer was attached to Robin Hood and the second official trailer on June 19, 2010, and was attached to Jonah Hex, Grown Ups, Inception and The Other Guys.

=== Box office ===
The American grossed $35.6 million in the United States and Canada, and $32.3 million in other territories, for a worldwide total $67.9 million, against a production budget of $20 million.

The film debuted to $13.2 million, including a total of $16.7 million over the four-day Labor Day weekend, topping the box office. It fell 57% to $5.7 million in its second weekend, finishing third, and another 53% to $2.7 million in its third weekend.

=== Critical response ===
On Rotten Tomatoes, the film holds an approval rating of 64% based on 223 reviews, with an average rating of 6.5/10. The website's critical consensus states: "As beautifully shot as it is emotionally restrained, The American is an unusually divisive spy thriller—and one that rests on an unusually subdued performance from George Clooney." On Metacritic, the film has a weighted average score of 61 out of 100, based on 36 critics, indicating "generally favorable reviews". Audiences polled by CinemaScore gave the film an average grade of "D−" on an A+ to F scale. The score was attributed to disappointment after the film was marketed as being action-packed instead of focusing on suspense and drama.

Rolling Stone's Peter Travers gave the film two-and-a-half stars, writing that director Anton Corbijn "holds his film to a steady, often glacial pace", and that the result is of "startling austerity". Roger Ebert gave the film four stars, writing, "Here is a gripping film with the focus of a Japanese drama, an impenetrable character to equal Alain Delon's in Le Samouraï, by Jean-Pierre Melville." Leonard Maltin called it a "slowly paced, European-style mood piece, short on dialogue and action and long on atmosphere".

=== Home media ===
The film was released on DVD and Blu-ray on December 28, 2010.
