= Zhang Baosheng =

Chinese qigong grandmaster (1960–2018)

- Born: 張寶勝; 1960; Benxi, Liaoning, China
- Died: August 3, 2018 (aged 57–58)
- Occupations: Magician; Qigongist; Miner
- Years active: 1982-2002

Zhang Baosheng (simplified Chinese: 张宝胜; traditional Chinese: 張寶勝; 1960 – 3 August 2018) was a so-called Qigong grandmaster during the peak of Qigong's popularity, "Qigong fever," in China. Baosheng claimed supernatural abilities developed through it, including but not limited to: x-ray vision, pyrokinesis, spoon bending, healing and the ability to pass objects through other non-permeable objects using telekinesis. These claims were unfounded under investigation.

== Biography ==
According to Zhang's official biography, Superman, he was born in 1960 in Anhui to very poor parents and was given away at a young age to a couple in Benxi, Liaoning. His adopted father was the Chinese Communist Party Committee Secretary of the Xihu district of Benxi, and his mother was an artist. They both died around the year 2000. He graduated junior high school and took occupation as a miner. Zhang's claim of supernatural abilities came following the popularity of a Dazu schoolboy, Tang Yu. David Palmer, author of Qigong Fever: Body, Science, and Utopia in China, wrote that Yu first rose to popularity in 1978. He was said to have been walking when he accused the friend that was accompanying him, Chen Xiaoming, of concealing a certain brand of Chinese cigarettes in his pocket. Xiaoming initially denied it but Yu reached in his pocket and pulled them out. Xiaoming was amazed at the fact. Tang Yu's claims attained credence because of the communist government's confirmation of his abilities. Yu was described by The Sichuan Daily, an official Chinese Communist Party (CCP) newspaper, as, "a child who could allegedly read Chinese characters with his ears." Yu was apparently able to read the characters of small balled up pieces of paper placed within his ear. Similarly, Zhang Baosheng was first "able to read with his nose." Zhang was said to be capable of "smelling" the contents of concealed written messages.

Zhang claimed further abilities such as seeing through people's bodies and the ability to place objects in closed containers without touching them. Zhang was called on by the local police to assist in solving criminal cases and by the local hospital to serve as a human X-ray machine.

In the spring of 1982, Zhang was invited by the Chinese Somatic Science Society (CSSS) to demonstrate his skills, and he convinced them of his abilities. Afterwards, CCP leaders in Beijing learned of Zhang and were interested. Zhang was one of the "Healers with Extraordinary Powers" invited into the Zhongnanhai leadership compound to treat the daughter-in-law of General Chen Geng. Zhang, described as charismatic, earned the trust of the officials. He was invited to the home of Ye Jianying, who orchestrated the overthrow of the "Gang of Four" following the death of Mao Zedong. After the demonstration in which he read characters on folded paper, Ye exclaimed amazement and support for research on Extraordinary Powers. He was again called to Ye's home after he had fallen sick with a respiratory illness. Zhang reportedly produced phlegm from Ye's throat and chest using qi, allowing him to breathe easy. Ye gave him a special passport allowing him access to important places, ordered him paid well, and given good living conditions. His supposed powers were further researched by No. 506 Institute of Aeronautical Engineering of the Commission of Science Technology and Industry for National Defense (COSTIND) where he was appointed. He was the first to push ideas of a "cosmic field," almost aura in which participation, through Qigong, or through simply observing, would allow extraordinary events to occur, even miracles.

By the mid 1980s, Zhang was a favorite among CCP leaders, and the most renowned of any of the masters of Extraordinary Powers. He had developed a cult-like following among the people of China, specifically Beijing. Believers in the Extraordinary Powers believed him decidedly the most powerful. He performed for top government officials, military leaders, scientists, actors, actresses, and foreigners. By the late 1980s Qigong was a sensation. He was called "superman," "person from the stars," "guest from other world," "living buddha," even "Chinese God." He drove a luxury car, and he lived in a luxury home; these were conditions reserved for the most respected Chinese officials. He had a siren on his car that allowed him to go through traffic lights.

In 1988, he was exposed by the Committee for the Scientific Investigation of Claims of the Paranormal (CSICOP). The committee investigated whether he could truly pull a pill through a bottle, and if he could truly read a concealed message. The demonstration took place in front of a crowd of 50 people, including high ranking officials and scientists. However the experiment was not in the control of the committee and many opportunities for tampering were introduced, such as Zhang leaving the room unattended 11 times. The sealed points on all four bottles were revealed broken even when Zhang was cautioned not to. When it came time for Zhang to read the message in the sealed and covertly marked envelope, He folded the envelope and handed it to one of the experimenters, and said he would reveal the message in 15 minutes. He then left the room. Upon his exit, Ti Yueli, a Beijing illusionist performer invited to observe by CSICOP, revealed that Zhang had used sleight of hand to replace the envelope with a facsimile. This was confirmed when the folded envelope was examined and no marks were found. When Zhang came back he refused to reveal the message and would not speak further on the performance. The show was photographed. Believers stated the presence of magician James Randi, CSICOP co-founder, was the reason for the failure. They accused Randi of using his own powers to counteract that of Zhang's.

Zhang was further exposed in various Taiwanese news publication through the 1990s, some dubbing him a "low-level magician." Indeed many of his tricks can be explained through illusionist techniques. His supposed healings often resulted in a fluid or blob of some form appearing in his hand which he would claim he removed from the body. Before one treatment in 1990, he took a long shower in the hotel room. Afterwards, he removed pus from a patient's lesion. Curiously, after Zhang left it was observed that a new piece of soap had scratches on it, and it was theorized the pus was water and soap. Other skills that he was famous for such as spoon-bending, smoke from the fingers, and rejoining torn cards have long been exposed as common trickery. The rest of his abilities were explainable through sleight of hand and because each time he performed he left the room unattended often. He claimed this was due to Qigong Rejuvenation and body regulation. He was also followed around by an entourage of followers that would provide distraction and confirm a trick successful even when it had not been.

Zhang Baosheng became more and more discredited through the 1990s. The government was cracking down on such outlandish claims. In 1994, the Central Committee of the Chinese Communist Party issued, "Several Opinions on Strengthening the Popularization of Science," which promoted fact-based finding. Afterwards, several articles discrediting Zhang were published in China. This included He Zuoxiu's paper titled, "Zhang Baosheng's Defeat at Maicheng: A Belated Report" which thoroughly debunked Zhang's supernatural assertions as being fraudulent sleight of hand. In 1998, all testing with the Institute of Aeronautical Engineering of COSTIND ceased after 16 years, yet he was still allowed a place in the Space Research Centre.

Qigong became associated with the Falun Gong. When the Chinese government started their persecution of the Falun Gong in 1999, they associated with Zhang even less, and he then tried to remain out of the public eye. He was still very rich, well respected among the powerful of China, and his services were still in demand. His last public appearance was in 2002 at the farewell ceremony of Wu Shaozu, who at one point ran the day-to-day of China's military-industrial research budget and approved research on Zhang. General Wu was forced to relinquish his post as head of the National Sports Commission due to the Falun Gong persecution.

Zhang died in the early morning of August 3, 2018 in Beijing. His cause of death was a heart attack at age 58. In his later years, he lived unhappily in seclusion with a small circle.

== In popular culture ==
In the Hong Kong film franchise God of Gamblers, the minor protagonist Cheung Po-Sing (simplified Chinese: 张宝成; traditional Chinese: 張寶成) bearing a reference to Zhang is similarly reputed for allegedly possessing supernatural powers and is similarly recruited by the Chinese police for investigations. It is eventually revealed, that Cheung Po-Sing's ability has never been real, and the deceptive myth has been elaborately started by the protagonist in order to trick the antagonist into relying on a nonexistent supernatural power for cheating in a high-stakes poker game. The movie was released at the peak of hype surrounding Zhang's alleged supernatural abilities. Nine films have been made in the franchise with several spin-offs too.

== See also ==
- Project Alpha
