= Zeng Sheng =

Chinese military officer and politician

Rear Admiral Zeng Sheng
- 曾生
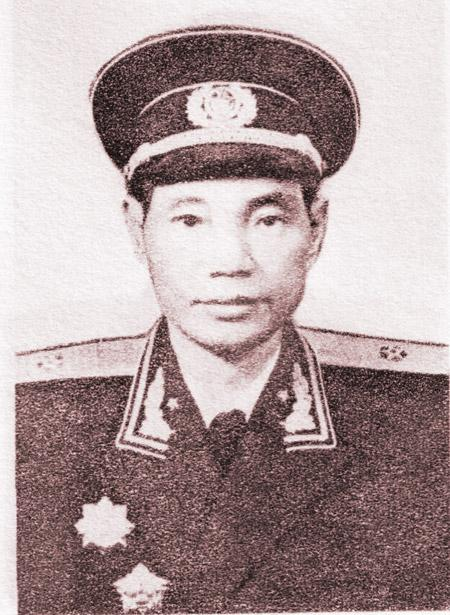

Personal details
- Born: Zeng Zhensheng; 19 December 1910 Huizhou, Guangdong, Great Qing
- Died: November 20, 1995 (aged 84) Guangzhou, Guangdong, China
- Awards: Order of Independence and Freedom (First Class); Order of Liberation (First Class)

Military service
- Allegiance: Communist China
- Branch/service: PLA Navy
- Years of service: 1938-1960
- Rank: Rear Admiral
- Commands: Central-South Military Region's Training Delegation to Korea; Shantou Military Control Commission; Pearl River Military Sub-District; Pearl River Delta Operations Command; Liangguang Column; East River Column
- Battles/wars: Second Sino-Japanese War; Chinese Civil War; Korean War

Chinese name
- Chinese: 曾生
Transcriptions
Standard Mandarin
- Hanyu Pinyin: Zēng Shēng
- Wade–Giles: Tseng^{1} Sheng^{1}
Hakka
- Romanization: ZenˋSenˋ
- Pha̍k-fa-sṳ: Chên Sên
Yue: Cantonese
- Jyutping: Zang^{1} Sang^{1}
Southern Min
- Teochew Peng'im: Zang^{1} Sêng^{1}

Birth name
- Traditional Chinese: 曾振聲
- Simplified Chinese: 曾振声
Transcriptions
Standard Mandarin
- Hanyu Pinyin: Zēng Zhènshēng
- Wade–Giles: Tseng^{1} Chen^{4}-sheng^{1}
Hakka
- Romanization: Zenˋ Zhinˊ-shangˋ
- Pha̍k-fa-sṳ: Chên Chṳ́n-sâng
Yue: Cantonese
- Jyutping: Zang^{1} Zan^{3}-sing^{1}
Southern Min
- Teochew Peng'im: Zang^{1} Zing^{2}-sian^{1}

Vietnamese name
- Vietnamese: Tằng Sinh

Korean name
- Hangul: 증생
Transcriptions
- Revised Romanization: Jeung Saeng

Zeng Sheng (Note: Chinese: 曾生; Pinyin: Zéng Shēng; Wade-Giles: Tseng¹ Sheng¹) (19 December 1910 – 20 November 1995), born Zeng Zhensheng (曾振声), was a Chinese military officer and politician. His name is also spelt as Tsang Sang, Tsang Shang, Jung Sung and Chung Sung in various sources. Tsang is best known for commanding a guerilla force operating in Hong Kong and Guangdong during World War II.

== Early life ==
Tsang was born to Hakka parents in Guangdong province in a village which was then in Huiyang (Fuiyong) and is now a suburb of Shenzhen. His father had been a sailor before jumping ship in Australia and operated a grocery store in Sydney. Tsang Sang attended primary school in Huiyang and Hong Kong, before moving to Sydney to join his father in 1923. Tsang attended Fort Street High School, but returned to China with his father in 1928 to complete his secondary education at the affiliated high school of Sun Yat-sen University in Guangzhou (Canton). He entered Sun Yat-sen University in 1933, where he joined a student organisation affiliated with the Chinese Communist Party and became active in student politics. Trouble with the authorities led him to move to Hong Kong in 1936, where he briefly worked as a school teacher and on the ocean liner RMS Empress of Japan, before resuming his studies at the end of the year.

== Military career ==
=== Second Sino-Japanese War ===
Tsang joined the Chinese Communist Party in 1936 and was given responsibility for political organisation amongst Hong Kong–based sailors, becoming secretary of the Hong Kong seamen's trade union in 1937. In 1938, after the Imperial Japanese Army began an offensive in Guangdong, Tsang asked to return to China to organise a guerilla resistance force. When the guerrilla unit was first established, it had no weapons, no pay, and even food was a problem. To solve these urgent needs, Zeng Sheng persuaded his mother to sell the few acres of land left by his father, reasoning that "when the Japanese came, we would have to run away [anyway]." The local resistance force in Huiyang commanded by Tsang was later combined with other forces to form the East River Column, which operated in Guangdong and Hong Kong throughout World War II with Tsang as its commander. Although Tsang's force had been formed with the assistance of the Kuomintang-led regular army and co-operated with Allied operations (including the rescue of British prisoners-of-wars and downed Allied airmen and assisting with MI9 operations in the New Territories), because of its Communist political affiliation, it also experienced a number of armed conflicts with Kuomintang-affiliated regulars.

In 1941, Hong Kong fell to the Japanese, who blockaded the transportation lines between Hong Kong and Kowloon and launched a massive manhunt for anti-Japanese patriots. In this critical situation, the Guangdong-Hong Kong Rescue Operation, orchestrated by the Central Committee of the Chinese Communist Party, was swiftly and secretly launched. Patriotic democrats and cultural figures who had been persecuted by the Kuomintang authorities and were residing in Hong Kong were rescued and transferred to the rear. After receiving instructions from Liao Chengzhi, Director of the Eighth Route Army Office in Hong Kong, Zeng Sheng, then Commander of the Guangdong People's Anti-Japanese Guerrilla Force, quickly dispatched a capable team to Hong Kong to assist in the rescue work, while he himself remained in Baishilong Village to handle reception. The first group of cultural figures to arrive at the Baishilong Church included over fifty people, such as Zou Taofen, Mao Dun, Liang Shuming, and Qian Jiaju, filling the village's small church to full capacity. After six months of rescue efforts, the guerrillas rescued more than 800 of such figures from Hong Kong. At the same time, more than 100 international friends also escaped danger with the help of the Communist Party and the guerrillas, generating a huge impact both at home and abroad.

On December 2, 1943, based on positive developments of the World War, the CCP Central Committee allowed the East River Column to be officially and publicly established in Tuyang Village, Huiyang County. The Jih Hsin Bank of Liang Chi-chih in Macau served as the group's liaison and financial organ, and he later continued his activities for the Liangguang Column and various other Communist agencies.

=== Chinese Civil War ===
At the end of the war, Zhu De appointed Zeng as one of the four representatives to accept the surrender of the Japanese army. His guerilla force then participated in the renewed Chinese Civil War on the Communist side. In June 1946, Zeng Sheng led the main force of the East River Column northward to Shandong. During his time there, he successively served as Vice President of the East China Military and Political University, Deputy Secretary of the Party Committee and Deputy Commander of the Bohai Military Region, and Commander and Party Secretary of the Liangguang Column of the People's Liberation Army, participating in the Eastern Henan, Jinan, and Huaihai Campaigns. Previously, in 1947, the CIA received information that the Southern Chinese Communists intended to form two "Democratic Allied Armies", with Zeng heading one of them. He was also reported to have allied himself with extortion racketeers (Note: Named the Overseas Youth Organization (海外育并行動派) in the document.) in the Hong Kong - Guangzhou area. To prepare for the conflict in South China, the Liangguang Column was placed under the jurisdiction of the Fourth Field Army.

In September 1949, Zeng Sheng, along with Lei Jingtian and Yin Linping, commanded the Southern Route Army, composed of the Liangguang Column, the Yue-Gan-Xiang Border Column, and the Central Guangdong Column, taking over the counties of Heping, Lianping, Heyuan, Longchuan, Huiyang, Boluo, Dongguan, and Zhongshan. In October, after arriving in Guangzhou, Zeng served as a member of the Central and South China Bureau of the CCP Central Committee, Commander of the Liangguang Column (incumbent), Commander and Secretary of the Front Committee of the Pearl River Delta Operations Command, and was ordered to lead his troops into the Pearl River Delta. After Communist forces took Guangzhou in October 1949, Zeng Sheng successively served as Deputy Commander of the Guangdong Military Region and Commander and Political Commissar of the Pearl River Military Sub-District (with headquarters in Shiqi), Secretary of the Pearl River Regional Committee of the CCP, and First Deputy Chief of Staff of the South China Military Region.

=== People's Republic of China ===
On 23 October 1949, the Kung Sheung Daily News reported his selection as Chairman of the Shantou Military Control Commission and an unconfirmed news that the Guangdong authorities were planning to formally designate him as Mayor of Shantou. The Overseas Chinese Daily News announced his appointment as Third Deputy Commander of the Guangdong Military District a month later. To combat the activities of Kuomintang insurgents, especially in the East River area, the new authorities sent Zeng to Huizhou to reorganize into militia units the old Chinese Communist guerrilla organizations which were disbanded after the Communist forces occupied the areas. He sought the help of the village people's governments and county-level farmers' associations in carrying out this plan. Around 30,000 arms were distributed to those who agreed to join the militia. Each man was ordered to sign a statement saying that the weapon would not be used for guerrilla activities. In late August 1950, Zeng was involved in firings on foreign shippings to cover up the actual strength of fortifications on the Lema Islands. (Note: Chinese: 擔桿列島) He was reported to have "ordered the firing on all ships, regardless of flag, which approach within three Chinese li."

In July 1951, Zeng Sheng convened a meeting aimed at reinforcing and adjusting military discipline, citing the "Zeng Shaofang conspiracy" and cases of misconduct and malicious damage by the troops. On 27 September 1951, Zeng and his old comrade Wang Zuoyao (Note: Chinese: 王作尧) established a commission to salvage sunken Kuomintang vessels in the Pearl River Estuary area on instructions from the Guangdong Military Region and was the member of a committee to select islands in the area on which to build defense installations. In 1952, he went to Korea to participate in the Korean War as Deputy Commander of the 12th Army of the Chinese People's Volunteer Army. In late September, Zeng Sheng was appointed Deputy Director of the Military Strategy Research Office of the delegation stationed in Vietnam. He was reportedly "accused of Chinese Communist Party violations and was placed under party surveillance", only to be exonerated shortly after and moved to his new post in Vietnam. After the Communist victory in the Civil War, Tsang was made a Rear Admiral in the People's Liberation Army Navy in 1955, and played an instrumental role in the development of the South Sea Fleet of the PLA's naval force.

== Later life ==
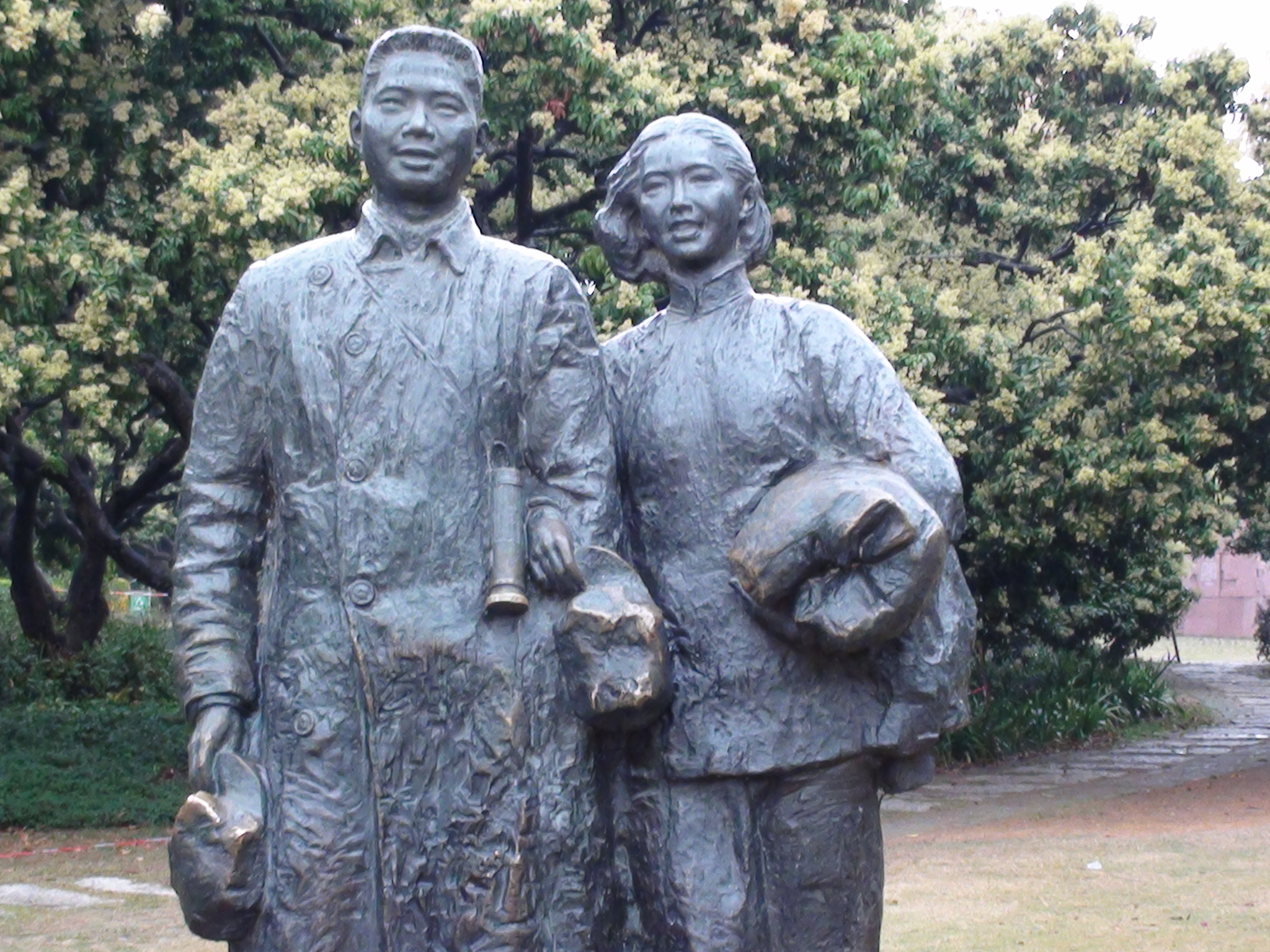
Statue of Zeng Sheng and his wife, in Shenzhen

He became the Third Secretary of the Guangzhou Municipal Committee, Mayor of Guangzhou in 1960 and then Deputy Governor of Guangdong Province. On 2 June 1962, in an attempt to calm the rioting mobs of Guangzhou, Zeng reportedly pleaded: "We are in a difficult period. You must control yourselves. Don't listen to people who incite you. Be calm and obedient."

When Zeng Sheng, as Mayor, urged Red Guards not to abuse overseas Chinese coming from Hong Kong and Macau during the Cultural Revolution, he was beaten. At one point, the Taiwanese alleged that he had escaped the mainland on 25 June 1968 and left Hong Kong for Russia, accompanied by six other anti-Maoists from Guangdong. Zeng was then jailed, but was released in 1974 and became Vice Minister of Transport, Transport Minister, and then an Advisor to the State Council.

In the spring of 1967, Zeng was secretly arrested and taken to Beijing, where he was placed under house arrest in a regimental compound on the outskirts of Beijing. People such as Lü Zhengcao and Zhang Xuesi were also imprisoned there. More than a year later, he was transferred to Qincheng Prison. Zeng Sheng was imprisoned in a 10-square-meter cell with a flush toilet and a washbasin. He was forced to sleep with his face facing the small door, was not allowed to turn over freely, and was not allowed to turn off the lights at night. Over time, his spine became deformed, developing bone hyperplasia, causing him excruciating pain. The food he ate was pickled vegetables and cornbread, far inferior to the rations of Kuomintang "war criminals" during the war. The investigators repeatedly interrogated him, focusing primarily on the development of the East River Column, its relationship with Luo Fengxiang, (Note: Chinese: 骆凤翔) and its cooperation with the Allied forces in establishing intelligence stations. They subjected him to repeated interrogation and reprimands for five years, conducting three to four hundred interrogations. The Lin Biao and Jiang Qing clique spread rumors that the East River Column was a "traitorous", an "espionage", and a "bandit force," and that "Zeng Sheng was a major traitor and a major Japanese spy." No matter how many times they interrogated him, Zeng Sheng's "confession" remained unchanged throughout 7 years.

In October 1978, the fourth board of directors of China Merchants Group was established, and Zeng Sheng, then Minister, concurrently served as Chairman of China Merchants Group until May 1981. During his tenure as Chairman of China Merchants Group, Zeng Sheng made significant contributions to the development of the ocean-going fleet and the development of the Shekou Industrial Zone. After retiring, Zeng Sheng served as a member of the Central Advisory Commission. Tsang died in 1995 in Guangzhou.

== Notes ==
Government offices
Preceded by Zhu Guang	Mayor of Guangzhou; 1960 – 1967	Succeeded by Post abolished
Preceded by Ye Fei	Minister of Transport; 1979 – 1981	Succeeded by Peng Deqing
