= Music on the Bamboo Radio =

1997 novel by Martin Booth

- First edition
- Author: Martin Booth
- Language: English
- Genre: Adventure novel
- Publisher: Hamish Hamilton Ltd
- Publication date: 1997
- Publication place: United Kingdom
- English publication date: 1997
- Media type: Print (Hardback & Paperback)

Music on the Bamboo Radio is a historical fiction novel written by Martin Booth that was first published in 1997. The story revolves around Nicholas Holford, the main character. Minor relations can be made to Martin Booth's life during the Second World War.

== Plot summary ==
The story begins with the Japanese army's defeat of the China forces occupying Hong Kong on 25 December 1941. Nicholas is an eleven-year-old boy whose parents have both suddenly disappeared in the chaos of war. As the Japanese come to do a home-to-home search, three loyal family servants, Tang, his wife Ah Mee, and the gardener Ah Kwan take Nicholas and they escape to Kowloon as Hong Kong Island is no longer safe. Upon reaching the shore of Kowloon, Tang and Ah Mee disguise Nicholas as a Chinese boy and the trip continues to Tang's home village, the village of Sek Wan.

Nicholas passes the years of the war here with Tang and his family. He is given the Chinese name Wing Ming. During this time, many events happen. Nicholas makes a dangerous journey back to Kowloon to get quinine cure to the malaria Tang has contracted. He also helps the Communist partisan army – The East River Column Fighters – to translate instructions for using heavy explosives. Nicholas joins the partisan army on a mission to Kowloon where they blow up a railway bridge and weaken the position of the Japanese army. Yet his most dangerous job would have been to deliver a medicine into the POW camps.Taking news or items to prison camps is known as "playing music on the bamboo radio". Nicholas does more than expected by entering the camp itself because the person who he was supposed to pass the medicine to had the fever. Exhausted and worried, Nicholas narrowly escapes the clutches of the Japanese with the help of the prisoners and finally reaches the safety of Sek Wan village.

As the war comes to an end, Nicholas returns to his home on Hong Kong Island, and when he returns, everything is ruined, and his home is badly damaged. As he walks through the house he finds his mother. Nicholas does not recognize her, as she seems much older and exhausted, but he knows it is his mother. It is nearly four years since he was last at home. At first he introduces himself as Wing Ming, then he remembers he is Nicholas Holford.
