= Qigong fever =

Late 20th-century popularity of Qigong in China

Qigong fever (气功热, Qìgōng rè), also known as the qigong boom, was a social phenomenon in the People's Republic of China during the 1980s and 1990s, in which the practice of qigong rose to extraordinary popularity, with mass daily practice. At its peak, it is estimated that the number of qigong practitioners reached between 60 and 200 million, developing a flourishing subculture.

With roots in traditional Chinese medicine and philosophy, qigong is a mind-body practice often combining slow-flowing movements, breathing techniques, and meditation that people in China deemed beneficial for health.

On December 5, 1994, the Chinese government issued a document which stated that it was "shocking" to see how "superstitious and benighted activities became increasingly rampant", warning that instances of anti-science and pseudoscience were frequently occurring across the country. The Qigong boom largely subsided after Chinese authorities launched a crackdown on popular qigong organizations in 1999.

== History ==
=== Triggering incident: Sichuan Daily's report ===
The Qigong Fever in China was heralded by what scholar David Palmer termed the "Extraordinary Powers craze". It began in 1978 in Dazu, Sichuan, when a boy named Tang Yu could purportedly recognize characters with his ears. Information about Tang spread among the local community and attracted the attention of Sichuan Daily reporter Zhang Naiming. Zhang went to Dazu to investigate to verify the authenticity of Tang's abilities and subsequently wrote an article in the newspaper. Having heard of the incident, Provincial Governor Zhao Ziyang (future premier of China) ordered the provincial Science Commission to investigate and support research into the area if verified.

In March 1979, Sichuan Daily, published an article about Tang Yu on the front page, which included a photo of Tang with Provincial Party Secretary Yang Chao—the most powerful leader in Sichuan province. Within three weeks, similar newspaper reports emerged across Beijing, Hebei, Anhui, Heilongjiang and Jiangsu regarding children with purportedly extraodinary abilities, often based on accounts from local Science Commissions and Party branches.

However, an investigative team from the Sichuan Medical College later concluded that Tang's ability to read with the ear was a "hoax". Following criticisms of purported extraordinary abilities from Hu Yaobang, then chief of the CCP Central Propaganda Department and future Chairman, People's Daily (the official newspaper of the Chinese Communist Party) published an editorial on May 5, calling it strange that "certain comrades in the scientific institutions and in leadership positions don't go to learn from science and scientists, but take the initiative to applaud conjuring tricks, are full of praise for 'magical ears', and go so far as to order that these children be well nourished." Two weeks later, influential Marxist theoretician Yu Guangyuan held a symposium denouncing the anti-scientific nature of the extraordinary claims. Well-known educator, Ye Shengtao, wrote that it was "simply a loss of face for China".

In September 1979, a prominent science periodical, the Ziran (Nature Journal), published a "Report on the observation of the recognition of images without visual organs", followed by a series of articles on children with special abilities by researchers from Beijing University, Beijing Normal University, and other academic institutions. Such articles continued to appear in every issue of Ziran in the 1980s. According to scholar David Palmer, "Coverage of these phenomena by a major scientific journal gave significant credibility to such research", leading to newspapers in China ingoring People's Daily's criticisms of such research—which, according to Palmer, is "an audacity rarely seen in China."

The event catalyzed the "Qigong Fever" era, featuring an intense division between believers in "Exceptional Functions of the Human Body" and critics denouncing it as pseudoscience. Shortly after the event, several Chinese media outlets began publishing reports of numerous other people, mostly children, who supposedly had ESP, or supernatural human abilities, and that ESP can be unlocked through practising qigong. China's state media, People's Daily, criticized believers of ESP as being unable to grasp reality.

=== Peak ===
During the following 1980s and 1990s, mass practice of qigong became extraordinarily popular in the People's Republic of China, with more than 2,000 qigong organizations and between 60 and 200 million practitioners. The movement is characterized by initial government tolerance of qigong, with emphasis on health benefits, traditional medicine and martial arts applications, and a scientific perspective; revival of interest in traditional philosophy, spiritual attainment, and folklore; rise to power of "grandmasters" (e.g. Zhang Baosheng) as cultural and political leaders; and opposing efforts to legitimize qigong based on science versus de-legitimize qigong as pseudoscience. Reportedly a famous rocket scientist, Qian Xuesen, had sworn by the spirit of the Chinese Communist Party that ESP was a legitimate science while other prominent scholars including Yu Guangyuan, had criticized ESP as being "anti-science propaganda" and that it can "never be accepted as science".

=== Decline ===
The move away from science as well as numerous qigong organisation's increasing independence from the government lead to the Chinese government disbanding the International Union of Qigong Science in 1994. In the same year, the Chinese Communist Party Central Committee and the State Council jointly issued a landmark policy document titled "Several Suggestions on Promoting the Popularization of Science and Technology", which marked the first major, unified effort by the Chinese central government to reclaim ideological and intellectual authority over the qigong fever movement. The policy document had lamented how it was "shocking" to see "superstitious and benighted activities became increasingly rampant" in the country and began endorsing opponents' voices to counter ESP claims. This included state media amplifying the work of He Zuoxiu, an academician of the Chinese Academy of Sciences. He Zuoxiu had publicly published the paper titled "Zhang Baosheng's Defeat at Maicheng: A Belated Report" which thoroughly debunked the famous ESP claimant Zhang Baosheng and exposed his supernatural assertions as fraudulent sleight of hand.

In 1999, the Chinese government instituted a systematic crackdown on qigong organizations that it labelled as being "cults" and were perceived to challenge state control, including prohibiting mass qigong practice, shutdown of qigong clinics and hospitals, and banning groups such as Zhong Gong and Falun Gong.

== See also ==
- Heterodox teachings (Chinese law)

== Sources ==
- Palmer, David A. (2007). Qigong Fever: Body, Science, and Utopia in China. Columbia University Press. ISBN 978-0-231-14066-9.
