= A Very Private Gentleman =

1990 novel by Martin Booth

- First UK edition
- Author: Martin Booth
- Language: English
- Genre: Spy novel
- Publisher: Century Publishing (UK)
- Publication date: 1990
- Publication place: United Kingdom
- Media type: Print (hardback and paperback)
- ISBN: 978-0312309091

A Very Private Gentleman is a novel written by British author Martin Booth, published in 1990. It is a tragedy following events in the life of a gunsmith who sells his services to assassins. The style is also partly in the form of classic confessional writing, as the protagonist seeks to explain the relevance of his choice of vocation. It was reissued by Bantam Books in 2010 under the title The American (ISBN 978-0553825725), after a film of that title had been made based on it.

== Setting ==
The time of the story seems to be late 20th century, more or less similar to the year of publication. The story is written in the first-person narrative from the point of view of the main character, who is known as Edmund or Signor Farfalla. He lives in a small hill town in the north of Italy.

== Plot ==
Signor Farfalla makes his living custom-fitting firearms as specified by assassins. To the townsfolk he puts on the role of a painter of butterflies, which can be found in diverse and rich measures in the hilly and forested areas around the village. He is reserved and highly skilled at keeping his real job a secret. Edmund is a foreigner, and although he does not reveal his origin to anybody, he pretends to be an Englishman. This is not far from the truth, since he admits to having stayed in the English countryside for a long time at an earlier stage in his career. Though his profession has demanded that he change locations from time to time, he has developed a fondness for the Italian village, in particular a young woman, and decides to stay. However, a person described as a "shadow-dweller" starts showing up in the mountains spying – or threatening – Signor Farfalla. While finding out who he is, the latter must decide whether to face his opponent or leave his home once more.

== Characters ==
- Signor Farfalla is a middle-aged man who is possibly from a country where English is spoken as a first language. He is a skilled craftsman, first and foremost with metal; but he is also a painter. He is well-read and spends much of his time lecturing to the reader about history, culture, politics, religion and literature. The time of writing of the story has Signor Farfalla sitting at an unknown place shortly after the events of his story. He is a thorough storyteller, who is very focused on describing the landscape and geography in which his story unfolds. However, he is also a lecturer of sorts, who takes great care to digress from the action of the story, to inform the reader on various subjects as they arise. He includes small essays about politics, religion, history, culture, as well as expositions about his own secret profession and the machinations of his own small and sinister "world". Unlike what one might expect, Edmund is not apologetic about his profession. On the contrary, he sees the need for people who kill to change the world for the better.
- Father Benedetto is the local Catholic priest in the Italian village. He befriends Signor Farfalla; and they discover a shared interest in wine, food, and the joy of debate and discussion.
- Clara is a young Italian student. She meets Signor Farfalla when he becomes her regular client in the local bordello. After a while, the two begin an actual relationship.

== Adaptation ==
The novel was adapted by Rowan Joffe into a screenplay for the film The American (2010), which was directed by Anton Corbijn and stars George Clooney, Thekla Reuten, Violante Placido, Irina Björklund, and Paolo Bonacelli. Concurrent with the film's release, the novel was republished under the same name by Bantam Books, with a cover design promoting the movie.

The film makes several small departures from the book's plot. For instance, the gunsmith has an agent in the film, whereas he finds work on his own (or it finds him) in the book. The main differences between the novel and film are the aesthetic tones and the ending. In the book, Edmund is an intelligent and persuasive defender of his work, while the film portrays a feeling of doom. While the book concludes with Edmund's leaving the village and Clara, the film adaptation fades to black only after Edmund has collapsed after being shot (whether he survives or dies is left unexplained).
