= Wu Jinglian =

Chinese economist

- 吴敬琏
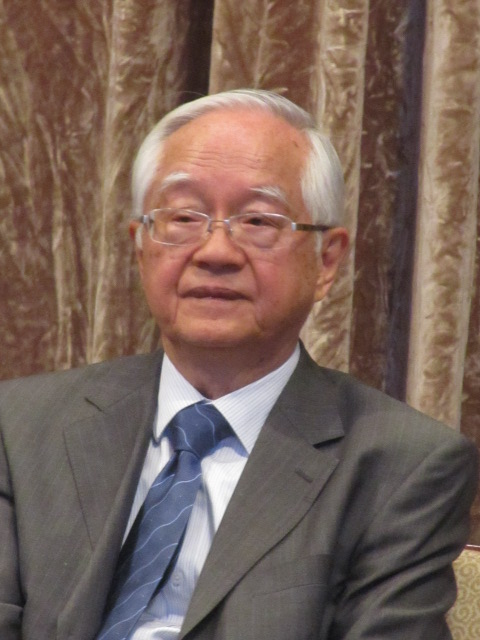
- Born: January 24, 1930 (age 96); Nanjing, Jiangsu, China
- Mother: Deng Jixing

Wu Jinglian (Chinese: 吴敬琏; pinyin: Wú Jìnglián; born January 24, 1930) is one of the preeminent economists of the People's Republic of China (PRC), primarily specializing in economic policy as it applies to China's ongoing reform and opening up.

Renowned for his resolute conviction that socialism is compatible with a market system, he is affectionately referred to in the media as Wu Shichang (Chinese: 吴市场; lit. 'Market Wu').

Wu currently (as of 2006) holds multiple positions, the most important of which are: Professor of Economics at both the China Europe International Business School and the Chinese Academy of Social Sciences; Senior Research Fellow for the Development Research Center of the State Council of the PRC; and Member of the Standing Committee of the Chinese People's Political Consultative Conference. As of 2021, he is also an adviser to the China Finance 40 Forum (CF40).

Wu graduated from Fudan University with a degree in economics in 1954. He later attended the Institute of Economics at the Chinese Academy of Social Sciences. Through his long career, he has, in addition to his professorships at Chinese universities, been visiting researcher and professor at a number of international universities, including Yale, MIT, Duke, Stanford, and Oxford.

A prominent target of political persecution during the Cultural Revolution, Wu was criticized for advocating the doctrine of "bourgeois rights."

He was forced to make public denunciations of his revered teacher Sun Yefang, for which he later expressed deep regret. He has honoured the memory of another victim of political persecution, Gu Zhun, whose unyielding character and pioneering attempts to revise Marxian economics in a market-oriented direction were for Wu a source of enlightenment. In the 1960s, Wu participated in a group led by economist Yu Guangyuan to write a textbook on political economy. The first economics textbook printed in China after 1949, the Political Economy Reader (Chinese: 政治经济学读本) was widely circulated and played a significant role in later economic reforms.

Having called for China's opening up and celebrated its entry to the WTO, Wu was distressed by the side-effects of rapid growth: corruption, inequitable distribution, and crony capitalism (more often the "magnate capitalism" in Chinese). In the last ten years he has joined Qin Hui, He Qinglian and other public intellectuals in raising social justice to prominence on the policy agenda.

Wu is also the author of several books on China's economic reform.

In 2008, state-owned media in China started calling Wu a spy for the U.S. The fact state-owned newspaper People's Daily was authorized to call him such indicates that his economic and political ideas are great annoyances for the current leadership.

Wu pointed out that "old-style Maoists" have been gaining influence in the government since 2004. These groups, he said, are pressing for a return to central planning and placing blame for corruption and social inequality on the very market reforms he championed.

Wu also pointed out that corrupt bureaucrats are pushing for the state to take a larger economic role so they can cash in on their positions through payoffs and bribes, as well as by steering business to allies.

Because of these developments, Wu is not optimistic about the future of China, because "[t]he Maoists want to go back to central planning and the cronies want to get richer."

== Books ==
- Fifteen Critical Issues of the Reform of SOEs, 1999
- Reform: Now at a Critical Point, 2001
- Understanding and Interpreting Chinese Economic Reform, Texere, 2005 (ISBN 1-58799-197-7)
