= Deng Jixing =

Chinese lawyer and politician (1907–1995)

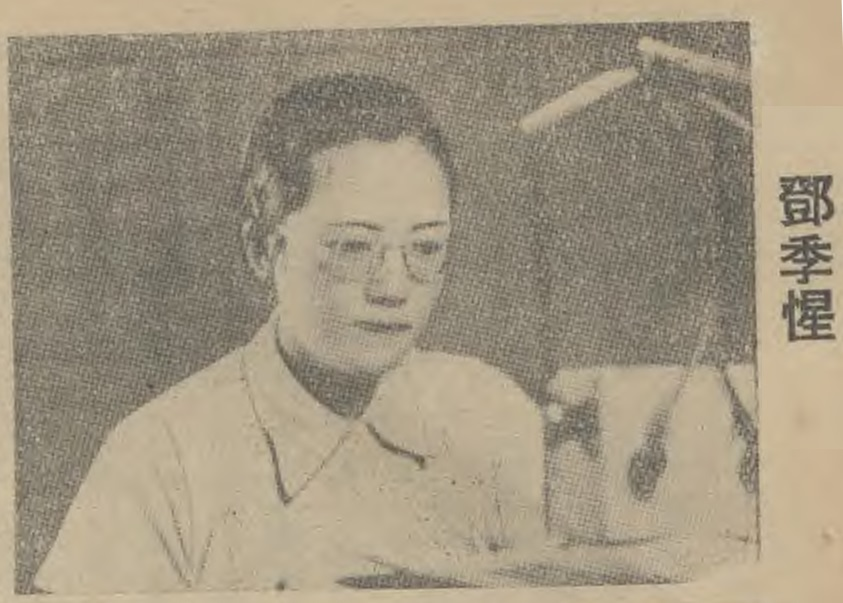

Member of the Legislative Yuan
- In office 1948–1950
- Succeeded by: Yu Xiaoquan
- Constituency: Sichuan

Personal details
- Born: 19 February 1907
- Died: 29 August 1995 (aged 88) Beijing, China
- Children: 3, including Wu Jinglian

Deng Jixing (Chinese: 鄧季惺, 19 February 1907 – 29 August 1995) was a Chinese lawyer and politician. She was among the first group of women elected to the Legislative Yuan in 1948.

== Biography ==
Deng was born in 1907 and was originally from Maotianliang, Qinglian, Fengjie County in Sichuan Province. She attended the Sichuan Province Second Women's Normal School in Chongqing. In 1923 she joined the high school affiliated to Jinan University in Nanjing, and the following year graduated from the Shanghai public school preparatory course.

In 1925 Deng married Wu Nianchun, with whom she had two daughters and a son, Jinglian, who later became a prominent economist. Wu died in 1931 and she later graduated from the Faculty of Law at Chaoyang University and began working for the Ministry of Judicial Administration. She worked as a lawyer in Nanjing and Zhenjiang and wrote the 'Legal Questions and Answers' column in the Nanjing edition of Xinmin Daily.

In 1933 she married Cheng Mingde, the founder of Xinmin Daily. Four years later she became deputy manager of the newspaper, and the following year moved to Chongqing, where she managed the local branch of the paper. In 1943 she established the Chengdu edition of the paper. She also became involved in education, opening kindergartens in Nanjing and Chongqing. In 1945 she managed the Nanjing and Shanghai offices of the paper.

Deng served a Senator in the first and second provisional Senate of Sichuan Province. In the 1948 parliamentary elections she was elected to the Legislative Yuan from Sichuan. She subsequently sat on the Education and Culture, Finance and Banking and Home Affairs and Local Autonomy committees. She moved to Beijing in 1949 and became manager of the city's edition of the Xinmin Daily. In 1952 she joined Beijing Daily and between 1955 and 1958 served as deputy director of the Beijing Municipal Civil Affairs Bureau.

She was classed as a 'rightist' in 1957. This status was withdrawn in 1979 and from 1983 to 1988, she served as the vice chairman of the sixth Beijing Chinese People's Political Consultative Conference. She died in Beijing in August 1995.
