= Calascio =

- Comune
- Comune di Calascio
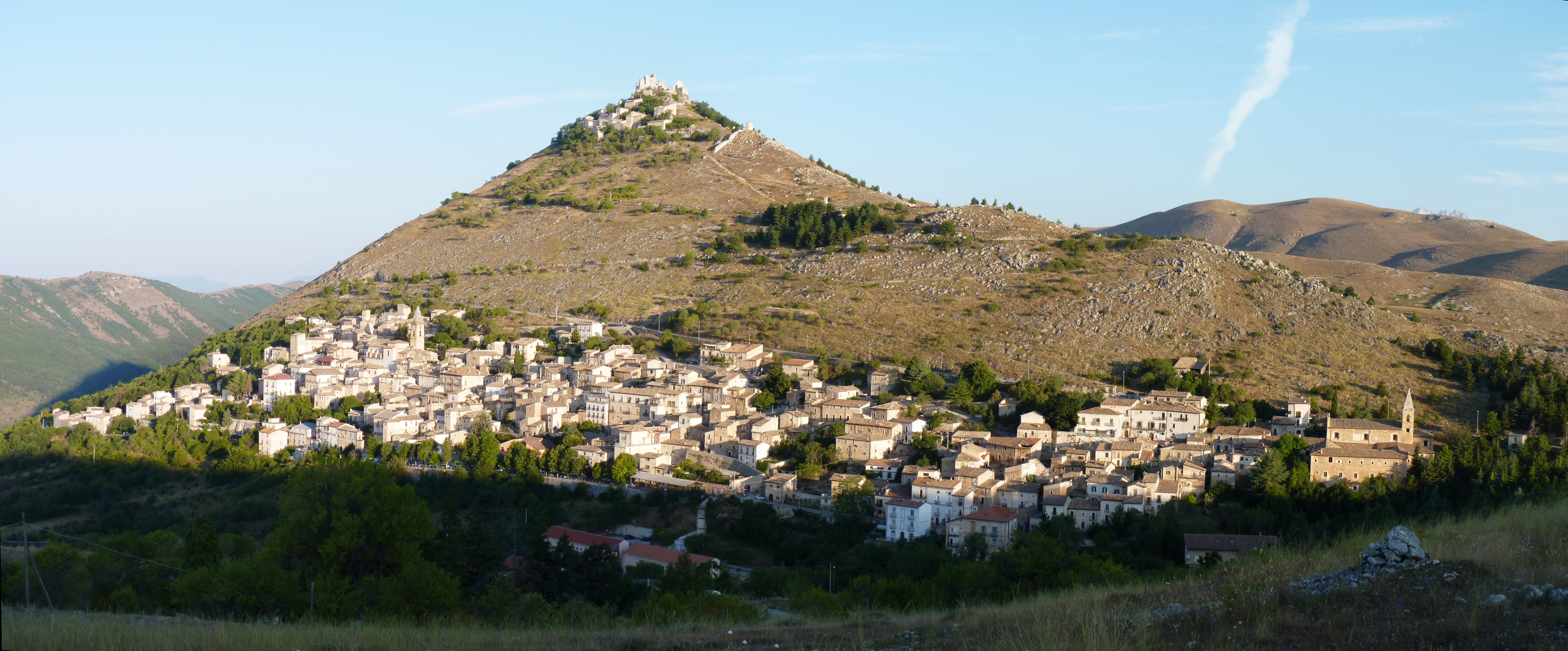

- Coat of arms

- Location within Italy Location within Abruzzo
- Coordinates: 42°19′39″N 13°41′53″E
- Country: Italy
- Region: Abruzzo
- Province: L'Aquila (AQ)
- Frazioni: Rocca Calascio

Government
  - Mayor: Ludovico Marinacci

Area
  - Total: 39.47 km^{2} (15.24 sq mi)
- Elevation: 1,210 m (3,970 ft)

Population (31 December 2013)
  - Total: 136
  - Density: 3.45/km^{2} (8.92/sq mi)
- Demonym: Calascini
- Time zone: UTC+1 (CET)
  - Summer (DST): UTC+2 (CEST)
- Postal code: 67020
- Dialing code: 0862
- Patron saint: St. Nicholas
- Saint day: 9 May
- Website: www.calascio.net

Calascio is a comune and village in the province of L'Aquila, in the Abruzzo region of central Italy. It is located in the Gran Sasso e Monti della Laga National Park.

== History ==
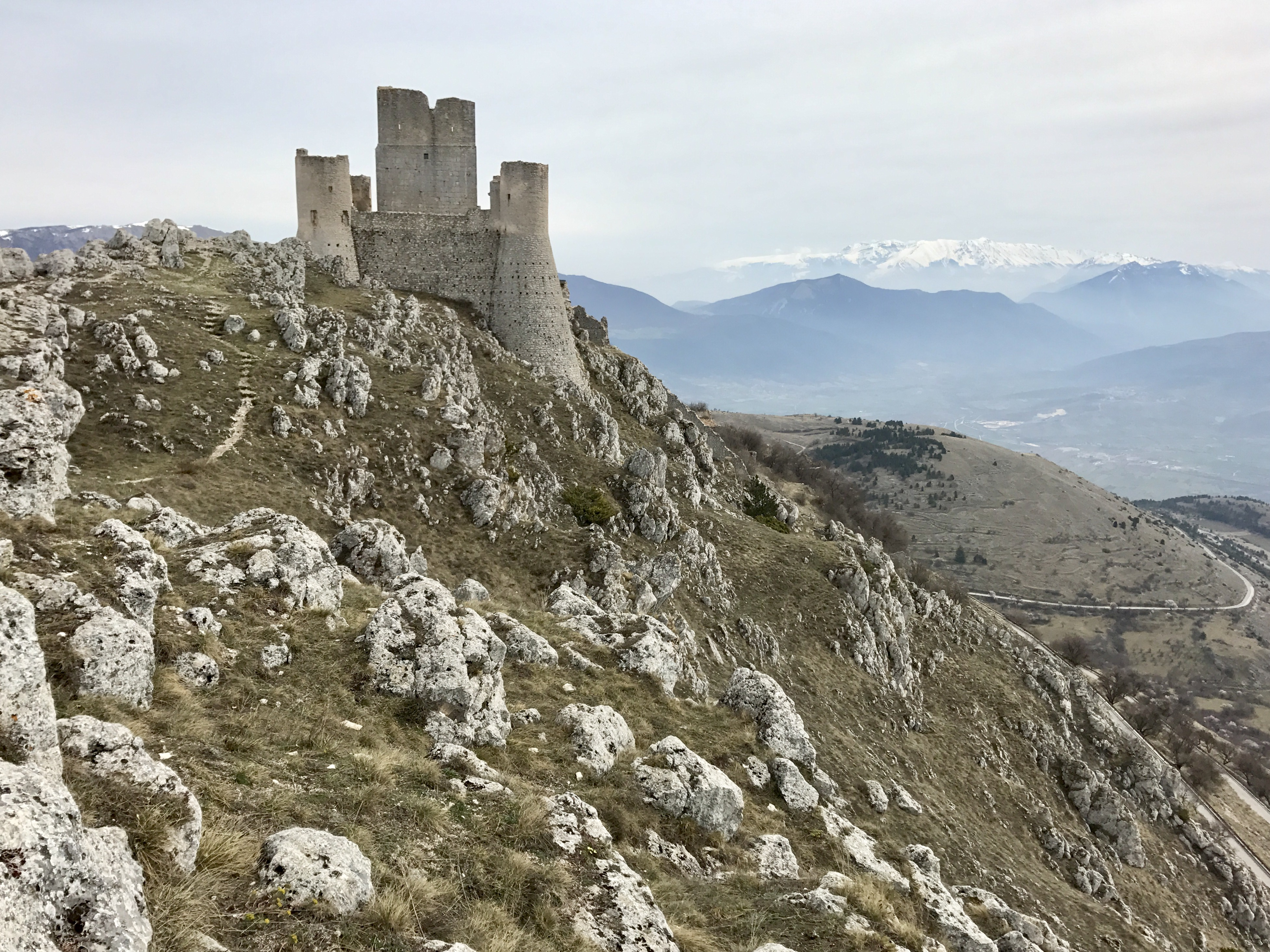
Rocca Calascio

The existence of the village, of Norman origin, is already testified from 816 in a document of Ludwig I as a possession of the "Volturnensi" monks. Later, around the year 1000, it was founded the fortress on the mountain above, originally a simple watchtower. In four the fortress grew in importance and size: moved from Barony of Carapelle (14th century), the Piccolomini family (15th century) and then to the Medici family (16th century), was placed under control of the chiefs of sheep involved in transhumance on the director of the Royal sheep track to Foggia. The structure of the castle was modified and expanded to its slopes and formed a small village, which is also perched.

So for a long period of time there was the coexistence of two villages, Calascio and Rocca Calascio, a different strategic functions being the first place on the mountainsides on the road that leads to Santo Stefano di Sessanio and Aquila, and the second in a dominant position on the whole of Navelli plateau and close to the Campo Imperatore pastures. It was devastated by the violent 1703 Apennine earthquakes, after which the heavily damaged fortress was almost completely abandoned and much of the population moved to the underlying Calascio. Since then, the latter developed more than the fortress.

== Points of interest ==
- Medieval church of San Nicola
- Castle of Rocca Calascio
- Church of Santa Maria della Pietà
- Medieval city of Castelvecchio Calvisio
- Medieval town of Santo Stefano di Sessanio
- Park of Campo Imperatore
