= Economy of Guangdong =

Economy of Chinese province

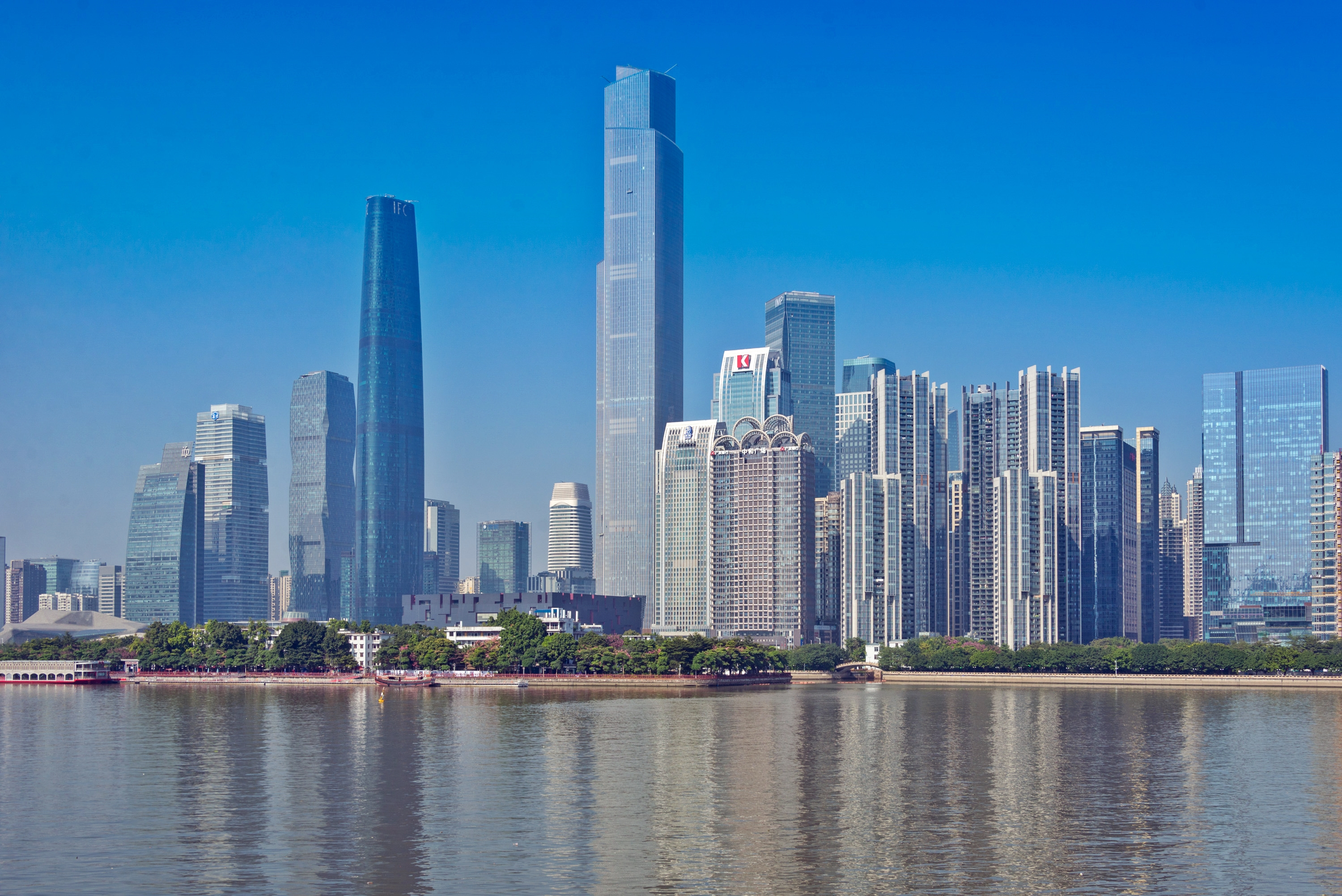
Guangzhou is the capital of the province of Guangdong.

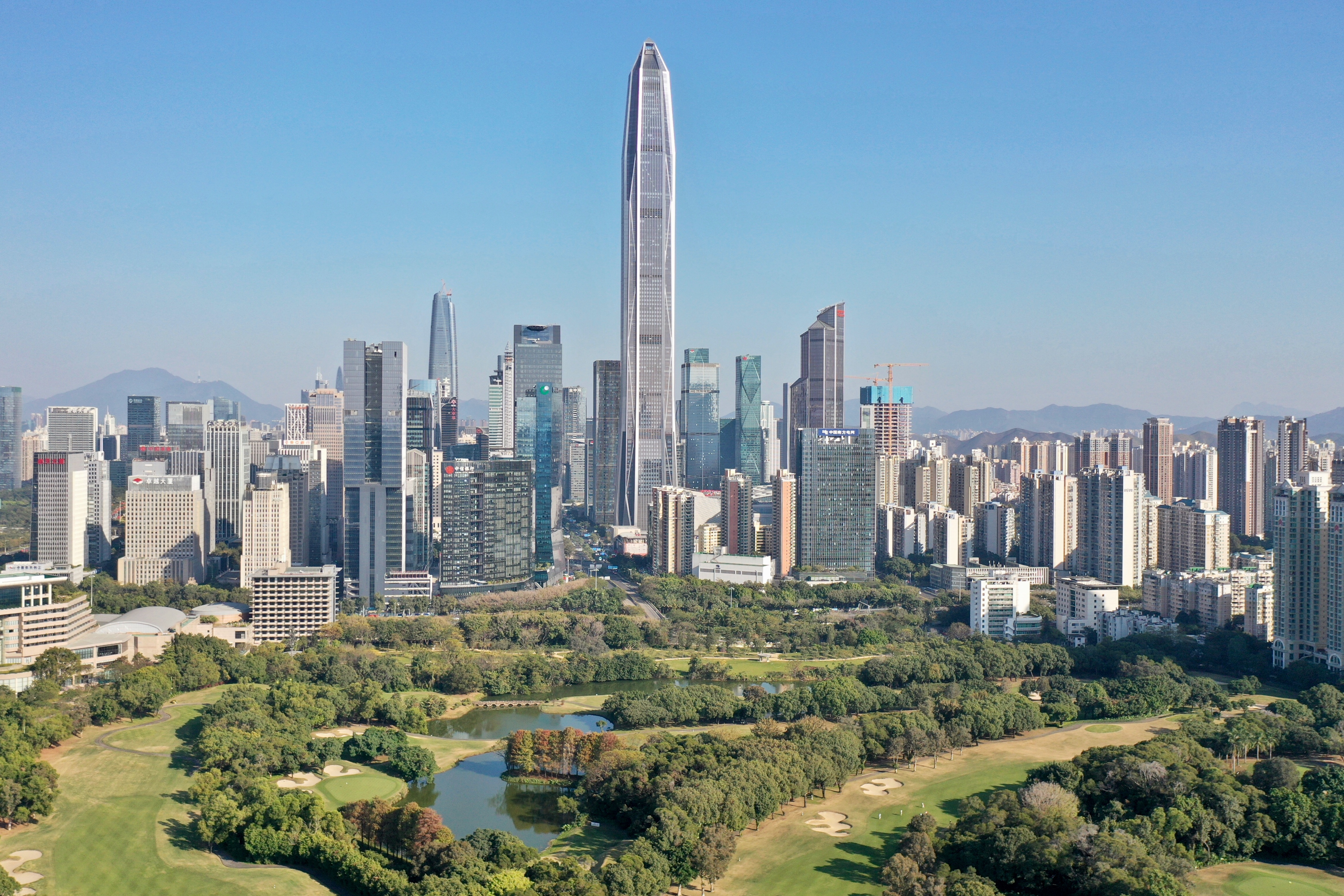
Shenzhen is one of the Special economic zones of China.

The economy of Guangdong is one of the most prosperous in China. Guangdong is located in southern China, bordering on Fujian Province to the east, Hunan Province to the north, Guangxi Autonomous Region to the west and the special administrative regions of Hong Kong and Macau to the south. It is also the largest economy of a sub-national entity in terms of GDP (almost US$2.0 trillion as of 2021) in all of Asia and 3rd largest sub-national entity in the world.

In 2021, the gross regional product (GRP) is about $1.95 trillion, with its per capita GDP of 98,700 RMB ($15,570 in nominal and $23,598 in PPP). Guangdong has been the largest province by GDP since 1989 in mainland China. In 2021, Guangdong's GDP was slightly larger than South Korea, the world's tenth largest economy. Guangdong's GDP by nominal is greater than the GDPs of all other BRICS states, except India.

By purchasing power parity (PPP) term, as of 2021, Guangdong's economy has a gross regional product (GRP) of $2.98 trillion, ranking between the United Kingdom and Italy with a GDP of $3.34 trillion and US$2.71 trillion respectively, the 10th and 11th largest in the world respectively.

== Overview ==
This is a trend of official estimates of the gross domestic product of the province of Guangdong:

Historical GDP of Guangdong Province for 1978 –present (SNA2008) (purchasing power parity of Chinese Yuan, as Int'l.dollar based on IMF WEO April 2020)
year	GDP				GDP per capita (GDPpc) based on mid-year population			Reference index	
year	GDP in millions			real growth (%)	GDPpc			exchange rate 1 foreign currency to CNY	
year	CNY	USD	PPP (Int'l$.)	real growth (%)	CNY	USD	PPP (Int'l$.)	USD 1	Int'l$. 1 (PPP)
2019	10,767,110	1,560,790	3,078,960	6.3	94,172	13,651	26,929	6.8985	3.497
2018	9,994,520	1,510,340	2,856,390	6.8	88,781	13,416	25,373	6.6174	3.499
2016	8,085,491	1,217,273	2,306,121	7.5	74,016	11,143	21,111	6.6423	3.5061
2015	7,402,743	1,188,546	2,085,809	8.0	68,629	11,019	19,337	6.2284	3.5491
2014	6,890,143	1,121,662	1,940,721	7.8	64,491	10,499	18,165	6.1428	3.5503
2013	6,345,544	1,024,599	1,774,034	8.5	59,756	9,649	16,706	6.1932	3.5769
2012	5,799,354	918,710	1,633,253	8.2	54,973	8,709	15,482	6.3125	3.5508
2011	5,395,920	835,437	1,539,273	10.0	51,523	7,977	14,698	6.4588	3.5055
2010	4,657,712	688,044	1,406,909	12.4	45,284	6,689	13,678	6.7695	3.3106
2009	3,993,713	584,645	1,264,834	9.7	39,890	5,840	12,633	6.8310	3.1575
2008	3,714,244	534,801	1,169,141	10.4	37,992	5,470	11,959	6.9451	3.1769
2007	3,205,379	421,539	1,063,179	14.9	33,562	4,414	11,132	7.6040	3.0149
2006	2,680,032	336,189	931,310	14.8	28,762	3,608	9,995	7.9718	2.8777
2005	2,272,329	277,394	794,799	14.1	24,828	3,031	8,684	8.1917	2.8590
2004	1,900,561	229,625	672,694	14.8	21,032	2,541	7,444	8.2768	2.8253
2003	1,595,925	192,814	587,493	14.8	17,927	2,166	6,599	8.2770	2.7165
2002	1,360,189	164,334	504,765	12.4	15,478	1,870	5,744	8.2770	2.6947
2001	1,212,659	146,509	446,569	10.5	13,952	1,686	5,138	8.2770	2.7155
2000	1,081,021	130,583	397,536	11.5	12,818	1,548	4,714	8.2784	2.7193
1995	594,034	71,133	217,643	15.6	8,139	975	2,982	8.3510	2.7294
1990	155,903	32,594	91,568	11.6	2,484	519	1,459	4.7832	1.7026
1985	57,738	19,662	41,191	18.0	1,026	349	732	2.9366	1.4017
1980	24,965	16,661	16,693	16.6	481	321	322	1.4984	1.4955
1978	18,585	11,039	-	1.0	370	220	-	1.6836	-

After the communist revolution and until the start of the Deng Xiaoping reforms in 1978, Guangdong was an economic backwater, although a large underground, service-based economy has always existed. Economic development policies encouraged industrial development in the interior provinces which were weakly linked to Guangdong via transportation links. The government policy of economic autarky made Guangdong's access to the ocean irrelevant.

Deng Xiaoping's open door policy radically changed the economy of the province as it was able to take advantage of its access to the ocean, proximity to Hong Kong, and historical links to overseas Chinese. Guangdong was one of the first provinces to be authorized by the central government to receive foreign investment. In addition, until the 1990s when the Chinese taxation system was reformed, the province benefited from the relatively low rate of taxation placed on it by the central government due to its post-Liberation status of being economically backward.

Although Shanghai is often cited as evidence of China's success, Guangdong's economic boom demonstrates that China has become a labor-intensive manufacturing economy. Guangdong's economic boom began with the early 1990s and has since spread to neighboring provinces, and also pulled their populations inward. Guangdong is China's largest exporter, as well as its largest importer of goods. Its extensive manufacturing base is largely privately owned, making it less reliant on fixed asset investments than other provinces in China.

The province is now one of the richest in the nation, with the highest GDP among all the provinces, although wage growth has only recently begun to rise due to a large influx of migrant workers from neighboring provinces. In 2021, Guangdong's per capita GDP was 98,700 RMB ($15,570 in nominal and $23,598 in PPP).

Guangdong contributes approximately 9% of the total national economic output. Now, it has three of the six Special Economic Zones: Shenzhen, Shantou and Zhuhai. The affluence of Guangdong, however, remains very much concentrated in a handful of cities near the Pearl River Delta.

=== Economic and Technological Development Zones ===
- Da Yawan Economic and Technical Development Zone
- Foshan National New & Hi-Tech Industrial Development Zone (Chinese Version)
- Futian free-trade zone
- Guangzhou Development District
- Guangzhou Export Processing Zone
- Guangzhou Free Trade Zone
- Guangzhou Nansha Economic and Technical Development Zone
- Guangzhou Nanhu Lake Tourist Holiday Resort (Chinese Version)
- Guangzhou New & Hi-Tech Industrial Development Zone
- Huizhou Zhongkai National Hi-Tech Industrial Development Zone (Chinese Version)
- Shantou Free Trade Zone
- Shatoujiao Free Trade Zone
- Shenzhen Export Processing Zone
- Shenzhen Hi-Tech Industrial Park
- Yantian Port Free Trade Zone
- Zhanjiang Economic and Technological Development Zone (Chinese Version)
- Zhuhai National Hi-Tech Industrial Development Zone
- Zhuhai Free Trade Zone
- Zhongshan Torch High-tech Industrial Development Zone
