= Martin Booth =

English novelist and poet (1944–2004)

- Born: 7 September 1944; Ribchester, Lancashire, England
- Died: 12 February 2004 (aged 59); Stoodleigh, Devon, England
- Education: Middlesex University
- Writing career
- Years active: 1967–2004

Martin Booth (7 September 1944 – 12 February 2004) was an English novelist and poet. He also worked as a teacher and screenwriter, and was the founder of the Sceptre Press.

== Early life ==
Martin Booth was born in Ribchester, Lancashire, England, as the son of Joyce and Ken Booth, the latter of which was a Royal Navy civil servant. The family moved to Hong Kong in May 1952, where his father was stationed for a three-year tour as a grocery supplier to the British Navy. In his memoir Gweilo: A memoir of a Hong Kong Childhood, Booth recalls that the streets of Hong Kong were safe, and that he explored the city alone as a child. He and his mother also learned Cantonese. He attended Kowloon Junior School, the Peak School, then King George V School, and left in 1964.

From 1965 to 1968 he attended Trent Park College of Education in Cockfosters, North London, part of what is now Middlesex University. His main subject was science, and he obtained the Certificate of Education.

== Career ==
In England, Booth worked as a truck driver, legal clerk, wine steward, and English teacher (in Rushden). He also taught English at The Castle School, Taunton.

In 1974 Booth was poetry editor of Fuller d'Arch Smith, set up by Timothy d'Arch Smith and Jean Overton Fuller. He had bought a house in Knotting, Bedfordshire, and was instrumental in finding Fuller a house in Wymington which also became the registered office of the company.

Booth first made his name as a poet and as a publisher by producing volumes by British and American poets, including Sylvia Plath and Ted Hughes. His own books of verse include The Knotting Sequence (1977), featuring the character Cnot who founded the hamlet Knotting.

In the late 1970s Booth started to write fiction. His first successful novel, Hiroshima Joe, was published in 1985. The book is based on what he heard from a man he met as a boy in Hong Kong and contains passages set in that city during the Second World War.

Booth was a keen traveller who enjoyed flying, expressed in his poems, such as "Kent Says" and In Killing the Moscs. His interest in observing and studying wildlife resulted in a book about Jim Corbett, a big-game hunter and expert on man-eating tigers.

Many of Booth's works were linked to the British imperial past in China, Hong Kong and Central Asia. Booth was also fond of the United States, where he had many poet friends, and of Italy, which features in many of his later poems and in his novel A Very Private Gentleman (1990).

Booth's novel Industry of Souls was shortlisted for the 1998 Booker Prize.

If truth be told, I never really left Hong Kong

Booth died of cancer in Devon in 2004, shortly after completing Gweilo, a memoir of his Hong Kong childhood written for his own children. The term gweilo means "ghost man" in Cantonese, but has been applied as a racial epithet for Caucasians (as in white ghosts). In the United States, the book was published as Golden Boy.

The 2010 film The American, starring George Clooney, was based on his novel A Very Private Gentleman.

Three Booth's novels have been translated into French : Gweilo, Music on the Bamboo Radio and The American.

== Works ==
=== Poetry ===
- Paper Pennies and Other Poems (1967)
- Supplication to the Himalayas. A Poem and Sketch (1968)
- In the Yenan Caves (1969)
- A Winnowing of Silence (1971) (poems)
- Pilgrims and Petitions (1971)
- The Crying Embers (1971) (poems)
- On the Death of Archdeacon Broix (1971)
- James Elroy Flecker, Unpublished Poems and Drafts (1971) (editor)
- White (1971)
- In Her Hands (1973) (poem)
- Teller: Four Poems (1973)
- Brevities (1974) (poems)
- Hands Twining Grasses (1974) (poems)
- Spawning the Os (1974)
- Yogh (1974) (poems)
- Snath (1975)
- Two Boys and a Girl, Playing in a Churchyard (1975) (poem)
- Stalks of Jade: Renderings of early Chinese erotic verse (1976)
- Horse and Rider, a poem (1976)
- The Book of Cats (1977) (editor with George MacBeth)
- Extending Upon the Kingdom (1977)
- Folio/Work in Progress. Poems (1977) (broadside anthology, editor with John Stathatos)
- The Knotting Sequence (1977)
- The Dying (1978)
- The Earth Man Dreams of a Turned Sod (1978)
- Winter's Night: Knotting (1979)
- Decadal: Ten Years of Sceptre Press (1979)
- Calling with Owls (1979) (poems)
- The Bad Track (1980) (novel)
- Devil's Wine (1980) (poems)
- Bismarck (1980)
- British Writing Today (1981) (editor)
- The Cnot Dialogues (1981)
- Meeting the Snowy North Again (1982) (poems)
- Looking for the Rainbow Sign: Poems of America (1983)
- Tenfold: Poems for Frances Horovitz (1983) (editor)
- Travelling Through the Senses: A Study of the Poetry of George MacBeth (1983)
- Contemporary British and North American Verse (1984) (editor)
- British Poetry 1964 to 1984: Driving Through the Barricades (1985)
- Killing the Moscs (1985)
- Under the Sea (Impressions) (1985)
- Aleister Crowley: Selected Poems (1986)
- American Dreams. A Poem (1992) (broadside)
- The Humble Disciple (1992)
- The Iron Tree (1993)
- Toys of Glass (1995)
- Adrift in the Oceans of Mercy (1996)

=== Fiction ===
- Hiroshima Joe (1985)
- The Jade Pavilion (1987)
- Black Chameleon (1988)
- Dreaming of Samarkand (1989)
- A Very Private Gentleman (1990) (reissued as The American following adaptation for the 2010 film The American)
- War Dog (1996)
- Music on the Bamboo Radio (1997)
- The Industry of Souls (1998)
- PoW (2000)
- Panther (2001)
- Islands of Silence (2002)
- The Alchemist's Son: Doctor Illuminatus (2003) (fantasy)
- Midnight Saboteur (2004)
- The Alchemist's Son: Soul Stealer (2004)

=== Nonfiction ===
- Carpet Sahib: A Life of Jim Corbett (1986) (biography)
- Rhino Road: The Black and White Rhinos of Africa (1992)
- Opium: A History (1996)
- Doctor and the Detective: A Biography of Sir Arthur Conan Doyle (1997)
- Magick Life: A Biography of Aleister Crowley (2000)
- The Dragon Syndicates: The Global Phenomenon of the Triads (2000)
- Cannabis: A History (2003)
- Gweilo: Memories of a Hong Kong Childhood (2004) [US ed., 2005, published as Golden Boy]

=== Works translated into French ===
- The American, Florent Massot, (2010)
- Gweilo - Récit d’une enfance hongkongaise, Éditions Gope, (2016)
- Ici Radio-bambou, Éditions Gope, (2019)
