= Sichuan Daily =

Simplified Chinese newspaper

The Sichuan Daily (Chinese: 四川日报; pinyin: Sìchuān Rìbào) is a Chinese language daily newspaper based in Chengdu, Sichuan, China. In 2020, Sichuan Daily and the Sichuan Provincial Committee of the Chinese Communist Party jointly formed an international communication center.
