= Li Chang =

Chinese politician

- 李昌 (pinyin: Lǐ Chāng)
- Born: 雷骏随; December 12, 1914; Yongshun, Hunan
- Died: September 3, 2010 (aged 95); Beijing
- Education: Tsinghua University
- Political party: Chinese Communist Party
- Spouse: Feng Lanrui

Political appointments

Commissioner, CPC Central Advisory Commission
- In office 1987–1992

Secretary, CPC Central Commission for Discipline Inspection
- In office 1982–1987

Secretary, CPC Committee for Foreign Cultural Relations
- In office 1964–1967

Academic responsibilities

Party secretary and Vice President, Chinese Academy of Sciences
- In office 1975–1982

Party secretary and President, Beijing International Studies University
- In office 1964–1967

Party secretary and President, Harbin Institute of Technology
- In office 1953–1964

Li Chang (12 December 1914 – 3 September 2010) was an official of the People's Republic of China. He served as the Secretary of the Central Commission for Discipline Inspection of the Chinese Communist Party (CCP) from 1982 to 1985, then as member of the Central Advisory Commission of the CCP Central Committee. Li joined the CCP in the 1930s, and later rose in prominence as a reformist. He was one of the key comrades of Deng Xiaoping.
