= Qian Jiaju =

Chinese economist (1909–2002)

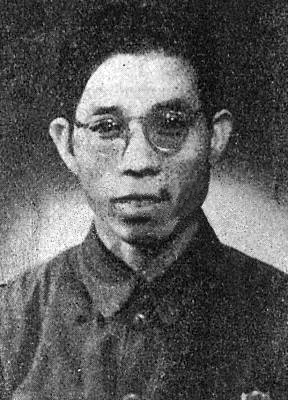
Qian Jiaju

Qian Jiaju (Chinese: 千家驹; 1909–2002) was a Chinese economist and a leading figure in the Chinese People's Political Consultative Conference (CPPCC) and in the China Democratic League.

== Life ==
Qian was born in Wuyi county, Zhejiang province, and graduated from the Department of Economics at Peking University in the 1930s. During the Hundred Flowers Campaign (1956–1957), he criticised the Chinese Communist Party for its political interference in science and technology. However, in 1967, during the Cultural Revolution, he was labeled a follower of Liu Shaoqi and faced persecution. After emerging in the 1980s, Qian continued to speak out against various government policies including the role of the National People's Congress (NPC), the Three Gorges Dam Project, and the economic austerity measures of Li Peng in 1988-1989. In 1989, he moved to the United States, where he embraced Buddhism. He later returned to China, and lived in Shenzhen, until his passing in 2002.

== Numismatics ==
In addition to his economic and political work, Qian was also interested in numismatics, and co-authored (with Guo Yangang 郭彥岗) 中国货币演变史 (History of the Evolution of Chinese Money). He provided the calligraphy for the front cover of Qianbi Bolan, the quarterly journal of the Shanghai Numismatic Society.
