= Falun Gong =

New religious movement from China

- The Falun Dafa emblem
- Traditional Chinese: 法輪功
- Simplified Chinese: 法轮功
- Literal meaning: Dharma Wheel Work
Transcriptions
Standard Mandarin
- Hanyu Pinyin: Fǎlún Gōng
- Wade–Giles: Fa^{3}-lun^{2} Kung^{1}
- IPA: [fàlwə̌n kʊ́ŋ]
Hakka
- Pha̍k-fa-sṳ: Fap-lùn-kûng
Yue: Cantonese
- Yale Romanization: Faat-leùhn Gūng
- Jyutping: Faat3 leon4 gung1
- IPA: [fat̚˧ lɵn˩ kʊŋ˥]
Southern Min
- Hokkien POJ: Hoat-lûn-kong
Eastern Min
- Fuzhou BUC: Huák-lùng-gŭng

Alternative Chinese name
- Traditional Chinese: 法輪大法
- Simplified Chinese: 法轮大法
- Literal meaning: Great Dharma Wheel Practice
Transcriptions
Standard Mandarin
- Hanyu Pinyin: Fǎlún Dàfǎ
- Wade–Giles: Fa^{3}-lun^{2} Ta^{4}-fa^{3}
- IPA: [fàlwə̌n tâfà]
Hakka
- Pha̍k-fa-sṳ: Fap-lùn Thai-fap
Yue: Cantonese
- Yale Romanization: Faat-leùhn Daaih-faat
- Jyutping: Faat3 leon4 daai6 faat3
- IPA: [fat̚˧ lɵn˩ taj˥ fat̚˧]
Southern Min
- Hokkien POJ: Hoat-lûn Tāi-hoat
Eastern Min
- Fuzhou BUC: Huák-lùng Dâi-huák

Falun Gong, (Note: UK: /ˌfɑːlʊn ˈɡɒŋ, ˌfæl-, -ˈɡʊŋ/ FAH-lun GONG, FAL-, -GUUNG, US: /- ˈɡɔːŋ/ -GAWNG) also called Falun Dafa, (Note: /ˈdɑːfə/ DAH-fə; lit. 'Dharma Wheel Practice') is a new religious movement founded by Li Hongzhi in China in the early 1990s. The movement was built on interest in qigong with additional religious and moralistic dimensions, and includes claims that its practices can cure illness, including serious or terminal illnesses, without modern medicine. It gained popularity in part through its health claims and practitioners' beliefs in their effectiveness. Falun Gong has its global headquarters in Dragon Springs, a 173-hectare (427-acre) compound in Deerpark, New York, United States, near the residence of Li.

Falun Gong emerged from the Qigong fever era in China in 1992, combining meditation, qigong exercises, and moral teachings rooted in Buddhist and Taoist traditions. Its central text Zhuan Falun also promises that practitioners can develop supernatural abilities such as clairvoyance, though such abilities can only be attained through moral practice and should not be pursued or abused. The movement is named after the "Falun" (Dharma Wheel), which according to Li's teachings, is a supernatural entity that he claims to install in practitioners' lower abdomen and is described as a spinning wheel. Adherents are taught that performing 5 exercises can keep the wheel rotating which the teaching says promotes health and eliminate disease. Li teaches that Falun Gong is the only means of truly curing diseases at their spiritual root, and characterizes that homosexuality, feminism, modern science, and conventional medicine as moral deviations incompatible with the Fa.

Although initially supported by some government agencies in China, Falun Gong developed during a period of growing official scepticism toward qigong movements. From the early 1990s, Chinese authorities, scientists, and journalists increasingly criticized some qigong organisations and practices as "unscientific", as qigong research failed to produce unequivocal proof that it constituted a scientific field. Falun Gong's rapid growth and independence from state control later led several top officials in China to perceive it as a threat, resulting in periodic acts of harassment in the late 1990s. On 25 April 1999, over 10,000 Falun Gong practitioners gathered peacefully outside the central government compound in Beijing, seeking official recognition of the right to practice their faith without interference.

In July 1999, the government of China implemented a ban on Falun Gong, categorizing it as an "illegal organization". Mass arrests, widespread torture and abuses followed. In 2008, U.S. government reports cited estimates that as much as half of China's labor camp population was made up of Falun Gong practitioners. In 2009, human rights groups estimated that at least 2,000 Falun Gong practitioners had died from persecution by that time. Falun Gong practitioners also face systematic societal discrimination in employment, education, housing, and business opportunities. Prior to its 1999 ban on Falun Gong, the Chinese government estimated there were 70 million adherents. In 2009, Falun Gong sources estimated that tens of millions continue to practice privately. A 2017 Freedom House report estimated there were between 7 and 20 million practitioners in China at the time.

Led by Li Hongzhi, Falun Gong practitioners operate a variety of organizations in the United States and elsewhere, including the dance troupe Shen Yun. The Falun Gong also operates the Epoch Media Group, which is known for its subsidiaries, New Tang Dynasty Television and The Epoch Times newspaper. The latter has been variously described as a far-right, (Note: "Far-right": Kaiser, Jonas (2019). "In the heartland of climate scepticism: A hyperlink network analysis of German climate sceptics and the US right wing". In Forchtner, Bernard (ed.). The Far Right and the Environment: Politics, Discourse and Communication. Routledge. p. 265. ISBN 978-1-351-10402-9.; Weisskircher, Manès (11 September 2020). "Neue Wahrheiten von rechts außen? Alternative Nachrichten und der 'Rechtspopulismus' in Deutschland" [New truths from the far-right? Alternative news and 'right-wing populism' in Germany]. Forschungsjournal Soziale Bewegungen (in German). 33 (2). De Gruyter: 474–490. doi:10.1515/fjsb-2020-0040. ISSN 2192-4848. S2CID 222004415. "In Deutschland existiert eine Vielzahl an alternativen Nachrichten-Plattformen von Rechtsaußen. Der Reuters Institute Digital News Report 2019 nennt Junge Freiheit, Compact online, PI News und Epoch Times als Plattformen mit der häufigsten Nutzung (Newman 2019: 86)." [In Germany there is a large number of alternative news platforms from the far-right. The Reuters Institute Digital News Report 2019 names Junge Freiheit, Compact online, PI News and Epoch Times as the platforms with the most frequent use (Newman 2019: 86).]; Allen-Ebrahimian, Bethany (23 September 2017). "The German Edition of Falun Gong's 'Epoch Times' Aligns with the Far Right". ChinaFile. Center on U.S.-China Relations at Asia Society. Archived from the original on 28 October 2017.; Alba, Davey (9 May 2020). "Virus Conspiracists Elevate a New Champion". The New York Times. Archived from the original on 1 December 2021.; Hettena, Seth (17 September 2019). "The Obscure Newspaper Fueling the Far-Right in Europe". The New Republic. ISSN 0028-6583. Archived from the original on 2 July 2020.; Aspinwall, Nick (2 November 2020). "Guo Wengui and Steve Bannon Are Flooding the Zone With Hunter Biden Conspiracies". Foreign Policy. Archived from the original on 2 March 2021.; Farhi, Paul (20 August 2020). "A 'loud mouth' writer says the White House broke its own briefing-room rules. So he did the same". The Washington Post. Archived from the original on 31 December 2020. "Last week, McEnany admitted representatives from two far-right outfits, the Gateway Pundit and Epoch Times"; Aspinwall, Nick (6 November 2020). "As Taiwan Watches US Election, It May Need Time to Trust a Biden Administration". The Diplomat. Archived from the original on 12 February 2021. "That's likely due in large part to the presence of influential Chinese-language far-right media on the island, such as the Falun Gong-backed Epoch Times"; Newton, Casey (12 May 2020). "How the 'Plandemic' video hoax went viral". The Verge. Archived from the original on 8 April 2021. "it won approving coverage from far-right outlets including the Epoch Times, Gateway Pundit, and Next News Network."; Pressman, Aaron; Morris, David Z. (7 August 2020). "This moon landing video is fake". Fortune. Archived from the original on 23 February 2021.; Sommer, Will (19 October 2019). "Bannon Teams Up With Chinese Group That Thinks Trump Will Bring on End-Times". The Daily Beast. Archived from the original on 7 January 2021. "New Tang Dynasty is part of the Epoch Media Group, a collection of far-right media outlets linked to Falun Gong"; Callery, James; Goddard, Jacqui (23 August 2021). "Most-clicked link on Facebook spread doubt about Covid vaccine". The Times. ISSN 0140-0460. Archived from the original on 29 September 2022. "Facebook's data on the first quarter of this year shows that one of its most popular pages was an article by The Epoch Times, a far-right newspaper that has promoted QAnon conspiracy theories and misleading claims of voter fraud related to the 2020 US election."; Waldman, Scott (27 August 2021). "Climate denial newspaper flourishes on Facebook". E&E News. Archived from the original on 28 September 2022.) right-wing, (Note: "Right-wing": Klawier, Tilman; Prochazka, Fabian; Schweiger, Wolfgang (2022). "Comparing Frame Repertoires of Mainstream and Right-Wing Alternative Media". Digital Journalism. 10 (8): 1387–1408. doi:10.1080/21670811.2022.2048186. "Other alleged RAM [Right-Wing Alternative Media], like Sputnik, Epoch Times or RT Deutsch, are more reserved and show no ideological tendencies substantially different from mainstream media, thereby mismatching their a priori classifications. [...] The MDS model in Figure 3 shows that most mainstream media form a dense region on the left side, which also encompasses the alternative outlet Epoch Times, being again close to conservative mainstream media Welt and Focus."; Freudenthaler, Rainer; Wessler, Hartmut (2022). "Mapping Emerging and Legacy Outlets Online by Their Democratic Functions—Agonistic, Deliberative, or Corrosive?". The International Journal of Press/Politics. 27 (2): 417–438. doi:10.1177/19401612211015077. "Lastly, and interestingly, cluster 4 within Figure 2 contains Russia Today, Epoch Times, and Deutsche Wirtschafts Nachrichten. These media play a prominent role within right-wing populist media spheres, but we find that they interestingly do not diverge much from mainstream reporting."; Klawier, Tilman (2024). "How many people use alternative media in Germany and how can we measure it?". Journal of Quantitative Description: Digital Media. 4. doi:10.51685/jqd.2024.016. "The different degrees and types of alternativeness can be illustrated with three outlets from the German right-wing alternative media sphere, which are frequently included in measurements of alternative media exposure that will be examined in the present study. The Epoch Times is a globally operating news outlet with a rather conventional orientation. It has a professional layout, covers a broad thematic spectrum, exhibits a neutral style of reporting, and offers subscriptions to paid content and a weekly print newspaper. Thus, the alternative nature of this outlet remains rather implicit."; Segura-Ballar, Gabriela (2021). "Defending "Western" Values: Reactionary Neoliberalism in the Americas". CLCWeb: Comparative Literature and Culture. 23 (1). doi:10.7771/1481-4374.4016. "American Thought Leaders is a program of the right-wing news website The Epoch Times."; Arndt, Thomas (2025). Media Bias: Examining the Facts. Bloomsbury Publishing. p. 77. ISBN 9798216183013. "Ultimately, traditional big-name newspapers tend to have a reputation for being left of center, although some of the newer, smaller ones like the Epoch Times have a more right-wing bent."; Majid, Aisha (27 January 2021). "Top 50 largest news websites in the world: Surge in traffic to Epoch Times and other right-wing sites". Press Gazette. "In an updated global ranking of the top 50 English-language news sites prepared by SimilarWeb for Press Gazette, pro-Trump right-wing title The Epoch Times made it into the ranking for the first time after seeing a 421% growth since December 2019 from 10.2m to 53.4m visits per month – more than any other site in the top 50."; Bump, Philip (16 June 2022). "The odd timing of Trump attorney John Eastman's claim of a 'heated fight' at the Supreme Court". The Washington Post. "There's a citation for that claim: an article from the right-wing outlet the Epoch Times."; Blood, Michael R. (17 August 2021). "GOP recall candidate Elder releases details on finances". Associated Press. "Records prepared for state regulators also showed Elder received income from advertising for a health supplement and work for the right-wing Epoch Times newspaper."; Bensinger, Ken (19 October 2025). "Epoch Times Reporter Resigns After Publication Signs Pentagon Rules". The New York Times. "A national security reporter at the right-wing Epoch Times newspaper has resigned after the publication signed on to rules restricting news gathering within the Pentagon."; Blaskey, Sarah (4 June 2021). "Records in Rebekah Jones case give peek at Florida COVID-19 response". The Tampa Bay Times. "The governor's reopening plan is being lionized in an 'exclusive documentary,' produced by the Epoch Times, a right-wing outlet published by the Falun Gong religious movement, titled 'DeSantis: Florida vs. Lockdowns.'") and conservative (Note: "Conservative": Brooks, Brian S.; Pinson, James L. (2022). The Art of Editing: In the Age of Convergence (12 ed.). Taylor & Francis. p. 107. ISBN 9781000529982. "Newspapers: Liberal: The New York Times, the Washington Post; Conservative: The Wall Street Journal, The Washington Examiner, Epoch Times."; Houston, Brant (2023). Changing Models for Journalism: Reinventing the Newsroom. Taylor & Francis. p. 80. ISBN 9781317516392. "The 51st company listed is the Epoch Times, which has a warning label attached to it because the conservative news organization's funding is unclear."; Miles, Jack; Taylor, Mark C. (2022). A Friendship in Twilight: Lockdown Conversations on Death and Life. Columbia University Press. p. 196. ISBN 9780231556248. "Interestingly, it was preceded by a very long commercial for the conservative paper Epoch Times."; Mathewson, Joe (2021). Ethical Journalism: Adopting the Ethics of Care. Taylor & Francis. p. 137. ISBN 9781000430356. "As most news organizations were fixated on the wildfires raging in the West during September, and Trump's denial that climate change was exacerbating them, another determinedly conservative newspaper, The Epoch Times, chose to feature an offbeat Trump-friendly story."; Riley-Smith, Ben (20 August 2019). "US conservative media outlet's ties to Chinese spiritual movement put in spotlight". The Telegraph.; Zadrozny, Brandy (13 October 2023). "How the conspiracy-fueled Epoch Times went mainstream and made millions". NBC News. "Today, The Epoch Times is one of the country's most successful and influential conservative news organizations."; Connelly, Eileen AJ (29 November 2022). "Trump's Truth Social Traffic Plummets 29% at Height of Midterm Campaign (Report)". The Wrap. "FoxNews.com draws about 10 times more visitors than the next most popular site, the Epoch Times, which was one of just two of the top 20 conservative sites The Righting tracked to report a traffic increase, with a 13% gain to 7.4 million visitors."; Siegel, Rachel (23 August 2019). "Facebook bans ads from the Epoch Times for violating transparency policies with pro-Trump ads". The Washington Post. "The Epoch Times, a conservative publication that has become a key promoter of President Trump and been criticized for spreading conspiracy theories, has been barred from advertising on Facebook."; Ortiz, Erik; Arkin, Daniel (6 July 2024). "Epoch Times, the conspiratorial pro-Trump outlet, enters a new market: Faith-based movies". NBC News. "This summer, the conservative media company is hoping to conquer new territory: Hollywood."; McKenna, Chris (9 September 2021). "Epoch Times newspaper, rising force in conservative media, buys Middletown office building". The Times Herald-Record.) media entity, and it has received significant attention in the United States for promoting conspiracy theories, such as QAnon and anti-vaccine misinformation, and producing advertisements for U.S. President Donald Trump. It has also drawn attention in Europe for promoting far-right politicians, primarily in France and Germany. Scholars and media outlets have discussed Falun Gong's opposition to the Chinese Communist Party (CCP), as well as its controversial teachings, including its rejection of modern science and conventional medicine and the conservative social views espoused by its founder.

== Beliefs and practices ==
Falun Gong is based around the teachings of its founder and leader, Li Hongzhi. According to NBC News, "To his followers, Li is a God-like figure who can levitate, walk through walls and see into the future. His ultra-conservative and controversial teachings include a rejection of modern science, art and medicine, and a denunciation of homosexuality, feminism and general worldliness."

Scholar David Ownby writes of four elements that effectively encompass Falun Gong in "capsule form". 1. That Falun Gong claims to be "profoundly moral". In line with Buddhism, Li instructs followers to abandon “attachments” (or “desires”) and teaches the concepts of karma and reincarnation, where “one reaps what one sows.” Li further argues that Falun Gong's three cardinal principles, truth, benevolence, and forbearance, are the forces that constitute the physical universe. His teachings also include apocalyptic elements adopted from “traditional strains of Chinese apocalyptic thinking.” 2. Li presents Falun Gong not just as a return to traditional Chinese culture but also as a major scientific contribution. Li appreciates the achievements of modern science but argues that it is incapable of understanding higher spiritual realities, multiple dimensions, and the ultimate nature of the universe. Ownby however states that few Western non-practitioners will find Li's "scientific" contributions as "convincing" and that most non-believers will see such teachings as more religious rather than being scientific. 3. Falun Gong promises followers supernatural powers in which Li himself claims to have many. Notably among these powers include Li having Fashen (Dharma bodies) that will watch over his followers and ensure both their physical safety and that they cultivate effectively. Li also teaches that karma commonly manifest as illnesses in the human body and promises that he can install a Falun (Dharma Wheel) in his followers' lower abdomen, to help purify themselves. 4. Falun Gong is "unabashedly Chinese" and emphasizes to revive authentic traditional Chinese culture. Ownby also noted that many leadership positions among Falun Gong practitioners are occupied by women.

Scholar David A. Palmer identifies four principal themes in Li's sacred writings (jing): 1. "Apocalyptic" theme concerning the moral decline of humanity and claims that extraterrestrial beings are influencing humanity through modern science. 2. "Rigorous spiritual discipline", in which Li calls on his followers to eliminate worldly attachments and "purify" themselves. 3. "Messianic" theme in which Li is presented as an "omniscient and omnipotent saviour of the entire universe" who revealed the "fundamental law of the universe", understood as the only tool to protect against the apocalypse. 4. "Sectarian practise" in which Li warned against both "religions and traditions of the past" and modern science, and instead directing that adherents should devote themselves exclusively to Falun Gong teachings.

According to scholar Benjamin Penny, being a Falun Gong practitioner consists of four main aspects, with the last one added after the suppression: 1. Perform five exercises that are intended to purify the body and reach a state to begin “advanced cultivation.” 2. Follow a moral code of “truth,” “compassion,” and “forbearance,” to ensure that the cultivation work by performing the exercises will be effective. 3. Read and reread the Falun Gong scriptures, especially Zhuan Falun. 4. “Clarify the truth” by giving information to non-practitioners about the current state of the suppression and nature of communism. Penny also argues that Falun Gong teaches a general worldview of the cyclic destruction of human civilization in which Li claimed that we are currently living in the "last days of Last Havoc". Penny argues that Li's teachings are clearly intended to present itself as being a path to salvation where Li "diagnoses" the present condition of humanity and prescribing guidances to practitioners to help them "transcend" their "degraded, fallen state".

Scholar Helen Farley writes that Falun Gong "draws heavily" from traditional Chinese religions, where in line with Buddhism, it asks adherents to abandon their "attachments", including to meat, alcohol, medicines, material possessions, or other human beings. However, Farley notes it also infuses a "contemporary veneer" with references made to UFOs and modern science. She writes that Li teaches that societal morals is declining to the point that humans are no longer being "up to standard", making an apocalypse is imminent, but that Falun Gong can bring salvation. Farley describes many of Li's doctrines as being socially conservative where Li opposes homosexuality and feminism. She also states that Falun Gong emphasizes "god-like" powers in Li in which he promises to use to "guarantee the health and well-being of his followers".

=== Central teachings ===
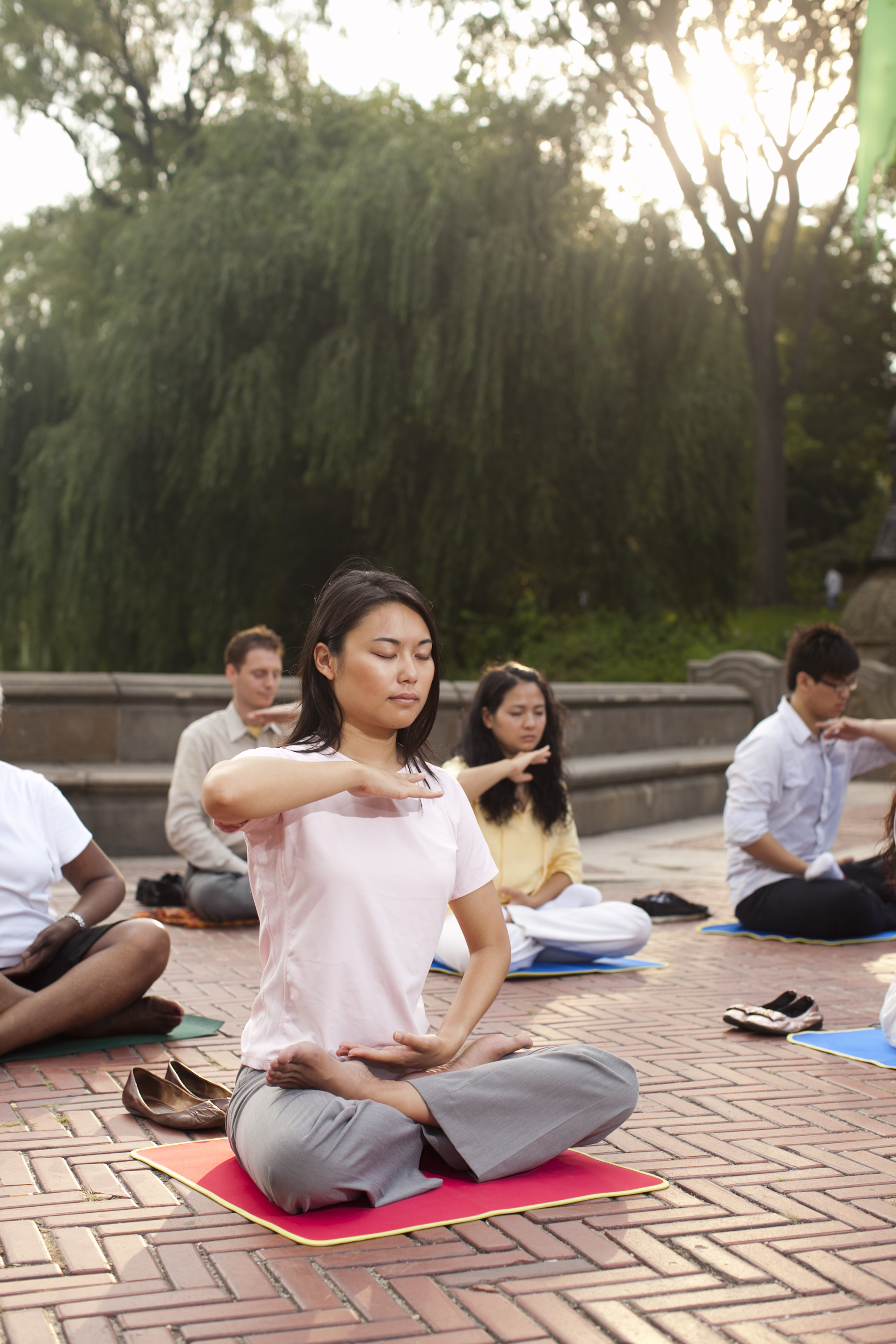
Falun Gong adherents practice the fifth exercise, a meditation, in Manhattan.

Central to Falun Gong is the concept of the "Fa", which Li describes as being the ultimate truth of the universe, transcending modern science. French sociologist David Palmer writes that Li 's teachings present him as a messianic and uniquely enlightened spiritual figure who was the first to reveal the Fa to humanity. Li teaches that certain things deemed incompatible with the Fa, like homosexuality and drug use, causes people to deviate from the universal law, resulting in greater illnesses and damage to one's spiritual development.

Scholar Benjamin Penny notes that despite borrowing ideas from Buddhism, Li had explicitly asserted that Falun Gong isn't Buddhism. One of the terms that Li borrowed from Buddhism is a supernatural entity known as "Falun" (Dharma or Law Wheel). According to Penny, although the term falun has its origins in Buddhism, Falun Gong gives it a distinctively different meaning. Penny explains that Li teaches it as a real object that he inserts in practitioners' abdomens although its physical existence is not located in our dimension but in a "parallel body in another dimension". Li Hongzhi teaches that, as the Falun spins continuously, it absorbs energies from remote areas of parallel universes. Practitioners are taught 5 exercises to cultivate and keep the wheel turning, which the teaching says promotes health and eliminates the need for conventional medicine.

According to Palmer, Li's teachings are strictly sectarian where practitioners are taught to be exclusive to Falun Gong practice and are warned not to learn other qigong systems, including Tai Chi. According to Li, many qigong masters are "swindlers" and that even thinking about other qigong practices can deform the Falun that he installed in practitioners' bodies. Li had asserted that it is "absolutely forbidden" for practitioners to read religious and medical classics including Buddhist sutras, the Taoist Canon, the Book of Mountains and Seas or the Book of Changes. Palmer notes that participation in Falun Gong is voluntary, but writes that Li teaches that only he can guide practitioners to a "superior level" and that Li teaches that his supernatural "Dharma-bodies" (fashen) accompany disciples, and protect and heal them, and know everything that passes through their minds.

According to the Falun Gong, the practice also aspires to enable the practitioner to ascend spiritually through moral rectitude. The three stated tenets of the belief are truthfulness (Chinese: 真; pinyin: Zhēn), compassion (Chinese: 善; pinyin: Shàn), and forbearance (Chinese: 忍; pinyin: Rěn). These principles are regarded within Falun Gong as the fundamental nature of the cosmos, the criteria for differentiating right from wrong, and are held to be the highest manifestations of the Tao. Adherence to and cultivation of these virtues is regarded as a fundamental part of Falun Gong practice. According to Li, humanity was once in harmony with these concepts (which are the fundamental characteristics of the universe) but descended to the ordinary level, in which humanity is a state characterized by unpleasantness, filthiness, and degradation.

Some commentators argue that Falun Gong practitioners tend to emphasize these core principles when speaking to outsiders while downplaying the more controversial aspects of Li's teachings, including his supernatural cosmology. Li has instructed his followers to avoid discussing such teachings in external settings.

In Zhuan Falun (轉法輪), the foundational text published in 1995, Li Hongzhi writes, "It doesn't matter how mankind's moral standard changes [...] The nature of the cosmos doesn't change, and it is the only standard for determining who's good and who's bad. So to be a cultivator you have to take the nature of the cosmos as your guide for improving yourself."

Practice of Falun Gong consists of two features: performance of the exercises, and the refinement of one's xinxing (moral character, temperament). In Falun Gong's central text, Li states that xinxing "includes virtue (which is a type of matter), it includes forbearance, it includes awakening to things, it includes giving up things—giving up all the desires and all the attachments that are found in an ordinary person—and you also have to endure hardship, to name just a few things." The elevation of one's moral character is achieved, on the one hand, by aligning one's life with truth, compassion, and tolerance; and on the other, by abandoning desires and "negative thoughts and behaviors, such as greed, profit, lust, desire, killing, fighting, theft, robbery, deception, jealousy, etc."

Among the central concepts found in the teachings of Falun Gong is the existence of 'Virtue' (Chinese: 德; pinyin: Dé) and 'Karma' (Chinese: 業; pinyin: Yè). The former is generated through doing good deeds and suffering, while the latter is accumulated through doing wrong deeds. A person's ratio of karma to virtue is said to determine their fortunes in this life or the next. While virtue engenders good fortune and enables spiritual transformation, an accumulation of karma results in suffering, illness, and alienation from the nature of the universe. In Falun Gong teachings, karma accumulates as a black substance in the body. Spiritual elevation is achieved through the elimination of negative karma and the accumulation of virtue. Through cultivating truthfulness, compassion, forbearance and practicing qigong, practitioners can turn the black substance into a white substance, eliminating the root cause of illness and leading to Consummation. (yuanman). Practitioners believe that through a process of moral cultivation, one can achieve Tao and obtain special powers and a level of divinity.

Falun Gong's teachings posit that human beings are originally and innately good—even divine—but that they descended into a realm of delusion and suffering after developing selfishness and accruing karma. The practice holds that reincarnation exists, with the cycle of rebirth shaped by the accumulation of karma—a concept somewhat analogous to the Christian notion of "reaping what one sows." A person's current life is the result of their moral behavior in previous lives and will similarly determine their future lives. This perspective helps explain the perceived unfairness of differences among individuals, such as between the rich and the poor, while also encouraging moral behavior despite these inequalities. To re-ascend and return to the "original, true self", Falun Gong practitioners are supposed to assimilate themselves to the qualities of truthfulness, compassion and tolerance, let go of "attachments and desires" and suffer to repay karma.

Traditional Chinese cultural thought and opposition to modernity are two focuses of Li Hongzhi's teachings. Falun Gong echoes traditional Chinese beliefs that humans are connected to the universe through mind and body, and Li seeks to challenge "conventional mentalities", concerning the nature and genesis of the universe, time-space, and the human body. The practice draws on East Asian mysticism and traditional Chinese medicine, but claims to have the power to heal incurable illnesses. Falun Gong describes modern science as too limited, and views traditional Chinese research and practice as valid.

Li says that he is a being who has come to help humankind from the destruction it could face as the result of rampant evil. When asked if he was a human being, Li replied "You can think of me as a human being." In Zhuan Falun, Li states that he cultivated supernatural powers starting at age eight. Zhuan Falun also promises practitioners supernatural powers such as "see[ing] through a wall or into a human body". Meanwhile, it states that these powers are byproducts of virtue cultivation, and should neither be sought after nor misused.

According to Yanfei Sun, a sociologist at China's state-run Zhejiang University, Li asserts that he possesses the ultimate truth of the universe, that he can assume incarnations to protect his followers, and that he can install a spinning wheel of energy in the abdomen of Falun Gong practitioners. Sun further stated that Li's teachings are syncretic, borrowing from existing traditions including Buddhism and Daoism. In particular, Falun Gong borrows heavily from Buddhist cosmology and soteriology but applies Li's idiosyncratic interpretation. According to Sun, Li asserts that the teachings of Buddhism and Daoism are confined to the Milky Way Galaxy, whereas Falun Gong's teachings are of the highest, universe-wide order.

=== Exercises ===
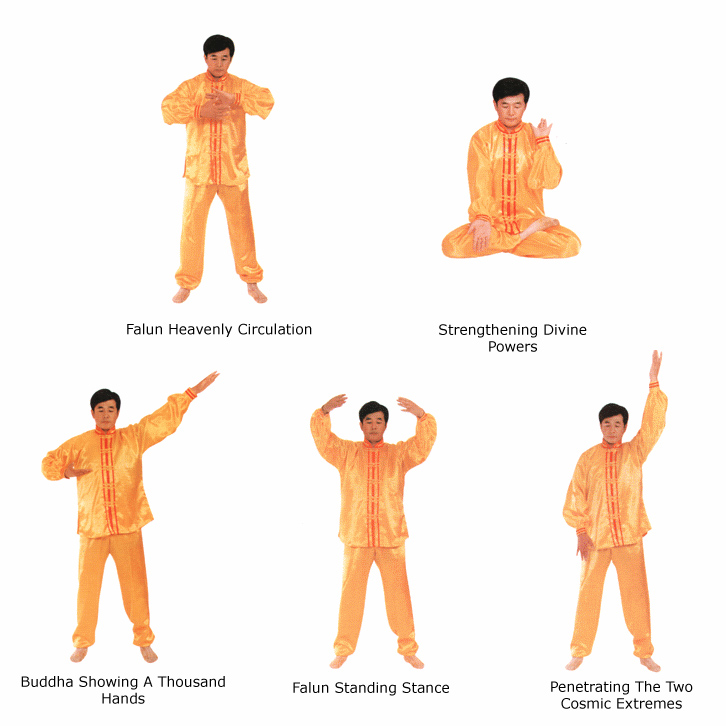
The five exercises of Falun Gong

In addition to its moral philosophy, Falun Gong consists of four standing exercises and one sitting meditation. The exercises are regarded as secondary to moral elevation, though are still an essential component of Falun Gong cultivation practice.

The first exercises, called "Buddha Stretching a Thousand Arms", are intended to facilitate the free flow of energy through the body and open up the meridians. The second exercise, "Falun Standing Stance", involves holding four static poses—each of which resembles holding a wheel—for an extended period. The objective of this exercise is to "enhances wisdom, increases strength, raises a person's level, and strengthens divine powers". The third, "Penetrating the Cosmic Extremes", involves three sets of movements, which aim to enable the expulsion of bad energy (e.g., pathogenic or black qi) and the absorption of good energy into the body. Through practice of this exercise, the practitioner aspires to cleanse and purify the body. The fourth exercise, "Falun Cosmic Orbit", seeks to circulate energy freely throughout the body. Unlike the first through fourth exercises, the fifth exercise is performed in the seated lotus position. Called "Reinforcing Supernatural Powers", it is a meditation intended to be maintained as long as possible.

Falun Gong exercises can be practiced individually or in group settings, and can be performed for varying lengths of time in accordance with the needs and abilities of the individual practitioner. Porter writes that practitioners of Falun Gong are encouraged to read Falun Gong books and practice its exercises on a regular basis, preferably daily. Falun Gong exercises are practiced in group settings in parks, university campuses, and other public spaces in over 70 countries worldwide, and are taught for free by volunteers. In addition to five exercises, in 2001 another meditation activity was introduced called "sending righteous thoughts", which is intended to reduce persecution on the spiritual plane.

Discussions of supernatural skills also feature prominently within the qigong movement, and the existence of these skills gained a level of mainstream acceptance in China's scientific community in the 1980s.Falun Gong's teachings hold that practitioners can acquire supernatural skills through a combination of moral cultivation, meditation and exercises. These include—but are not limited to—precognition, clairaudience, telepathy, and divine sight (via the opening of the third eye or celestial eye). However, Falun Gong stresses that these powers can be developed only as a result of moral practice, and should not be pursued or casually displayed. According to David Ownby, Falun Gong teaches that "pride in one's abilities, or the desire to show off, are marks of dangerous attachments", and Li warns his followers not to be distracted by the pursuit of such powers. Benjamin Penny notes that Li also taught that cultivation could produce physical transformations, including the disappearance of wrinkles, restored youthfulness, and, in the case of elderly women, the return of menstruation.

=== On healing and medicine ===
Like most qigong practices, Falun Gong's concept of healing through both physical exercises and moral cultivation aligns with Chinese traditions. Scholar Helen Farley wrote that Falun Gong teaches negative karma as being a black, sticky substance and that illnesses are a manifestation of bad karma. Falun Gong also teaches that it can be "renovated" into a pure and white substance through diligent practice of five exercises and through suffering in the form of illness.

Practitioners are not encouraged to rely on Western medicine, but are not prohibited from using it. Many do seek out doctors and hospitals. According to Ownby, Falun Gong teachings on karma holds that illnesses are a consequence of a past wrongdoing, and suffering can function as a means of eliminating karma. Both Ownby and scholar Benjamin Penny argue that this framework explains Falun Gong's approach to illness and medical treatment, in which disease would be understood as something that needs to be endured or worked through rather than immediately treating through medicine. According to Penny, Li's teachings holds that negative karma can be inherited from "ancestors, family relatives or close friends". Penny further states that "if disease comes from karma and karma can be eradicated through cultivation of "xinxing", then what good will medicine do?"

James R. Lewis noted that although Li stated he would not forbid practitioners from taking medicine, he nevertheless taught that practitioners should pass a "test" to become extraordinary. Li claimed that if someone is ill and "goes ahead and take medicine", then they had not passed the test and were merely another "everyday" person.

David Palmer writes that Falun Gong teaches that a true practitioner should not take medicines in case of illness". Li had taught that medicine only alters the outward appearance but it does not truly resolve the "karmic debt". In order to repay one's karmic debt, one has to let the illness "follow its natural course" unless Li himself intervenes. It is also forbidden to try to heal others with Falun Gong. According to Li, a person who tries to heal others with Qigong will only absorb the patient's "morbid energy" into their body.

Li taught that conventional doctors, especially those who practise Western medicine, could only treat the physical symptoms of diseases, but not their spiritual roots, as he claimed that illnesses are caused from bad morals and spiritual decline. He taught that people can instead cure themselves of physical and spiritual illnesses by practising Falun Gong and to morally rise above what he referred to as "ordinary people" (non-practitioners). He also taught that homosexuality, drug abuse, and pornography deviates from the "law" of the universe, leading to greater illnesses and further harm to one's spiritual development.

A 2020 joint investigation by Australian Broadcasting Corporation programs Background Briefing and Foreign Correspondent reported that they found families that had been damaged by their involvement with Falun Gong, and some cases alleged its teachings on modern medicine may have contributed to premature deaths. The Falun Dafa Association have stated that it's "ultimately a personal choice whether someone seeks medical treatment" but that if someone had taken up the practice of Falun Gong and understood Li's teachings, then "diseases can disappear".

=== Social practices ===
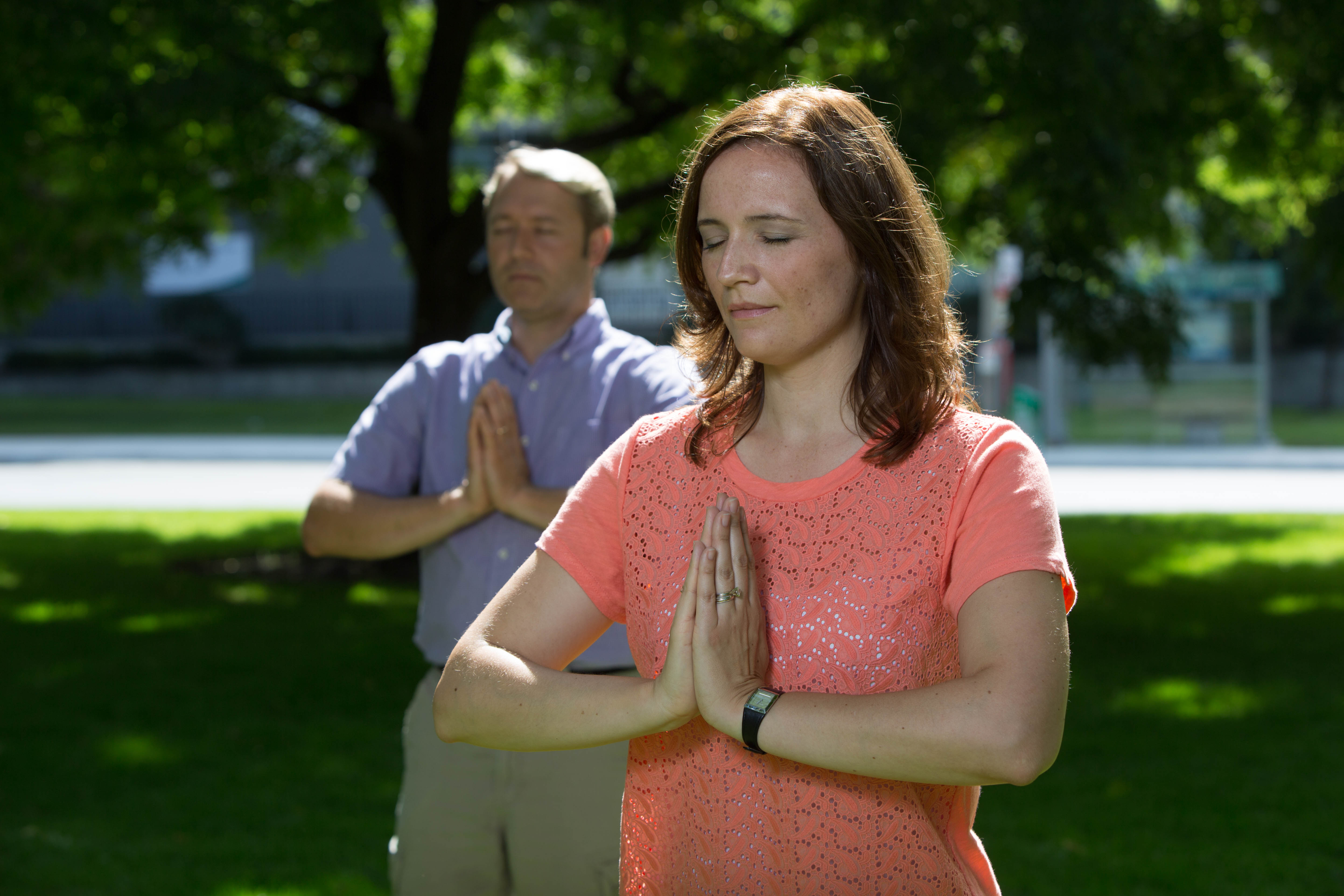
Falun Gong adherents practice the third exercise in Toronto.

Falun Gong differentiates itself from Buddhist monastic traditions in that it places great importance on participation in the secular world. Falun Gong practitioners are required to maintain regular jobs and family lives, to observe the laws of their respective governments, and are instructed not to distance themselves from society. An exception is made for Buddhist Bhikkhus and Bhikkhunīs, who are permitted to continue a monastic lifestyle while practicing Falun Gong.

As part of its emphasis on ethical behavior, Falun Gong's teachings prescribe a strict personal morality for practitioners. They are expected to do good deeds, and conduct themselves with patience and forbearance when encountering difficulties. For instance, Li stipulates that a practitioner of Falun Gong must "not hit back when attacked, not talk back when insulted." In addition, they must "abandon negative thoughts and behaviors", such as greed, deception, jealousy, etc. The teachings contain injunctions against smoking and the consumption of alcohol, as these are considered addictions that are detrimental to health and mental clarity. Practitioners of Falun Gong are forbidden to kill living things—including animals for the purpose of obtaining food—though they are not required to adopt a vegetarian diet.

In addition to these things, practitioners of Falun Gong must abandon a variety of worldly attachments and desires. In the course of cultivation practice, the student of Falun Gong aims to relinquish the pursuit of fame, monetary gain, sentimentality, and other entanglements. Li's teachings repeatedly emphasize the emptiness of material pursuits; although practitioners of Falun Gong are not encouraged to leave their jobs or eschew money, they are expected to give up the psychological attachments to these things.

Falun Gong doctrine counsels against participation in political or social issues. Excessive interest in politics is viewed as an attachment to worldly power and influence, and Falun Gong aims for transcendence of such pursuits. According to Hu Ping, "Falun Gong deals only with purifying the individual through exercise, and does not touch on social or national concerns. It has not suggested or even intimated a model for social change. Many religions [...] pursue social reform to some extent [...] but there is no such tendency evident in Falun Gong."

Sexual desire and lust are treated as attachments to be discarded, though Falun Gong students are still generally expected to marry and have families. All sexual relations outside the confines of monogamous, heterosexual marriage are regarded as immoral.

==== Homosexuality ====
Li Hongzhi taught that homosexuality makes one "unworthy of being human", creates bad karma, and is comparable to organized crime. He also taught that "disgusting homosexuality shows the dirty abnormal psychology of the gay who has lost his ability of reasoning", and that homosexuality is a "filthy, deviant state of mind". Li additionally stated in a 1998 speech in Switzerland that the gods' "first target of annihilation would be homosexuals". Although gay, lesbian, and bisexual people may practice Falun Gong, founder Li stated that they must "give up the bad conduct" of all same-sex sexual activity.

==== Racial-mixing ====
Falun Gong's cosmology attributes different spiritual heavens to different ethnicities, and that individuals of mixed race lose some aspect of this connection. French sociologist David Palmer reports Li has stated that "mixing the races of the world is not allowed" and described racial mixing as a "grave problem". Palmer further reports that Li claimed that "the white race has its Heaven, which occupies a tiny part of the universe", while "the yellow race has its Buddha-world and Tao-world" and fills "almost the whole universe". Palmer also cites Li stating that there is a physical and intellectual decline in mixed-race children, and that "modern science knows well that each generation is inferior to the preceding one".

Scholar Helen Farley likewise writes that Li taught that the "Cosmic Law" does not allow race-mixing. According to Farley, Li blamed modern science for race-mixing and preached that originally the West and the East were kept apart by "vast deserts" but modern science had taken away the obstacles so "that races may mix". Journalist Craig S. Smith noted that Li has taught that mixed-race children were the "spawn of the Dharma Ending Period", a Buddhist reference to a period marking "unprecedented moral degeneration".

Falun Gong's teachings also include belief in reincarnation and that one's soul (original spirit) always maintains single racial identity despite having a body of mixed race. Investigative journalist Ethan Gutmann noted that interracial marriage is common in the Falun Gong community.

=== Texts ===
Li Hongzhi authored the first book of Falun Gong teachings in April 1993; titled China Falun Gong, or simply Falun Gong, it is an introductory text that discusses qigong, Falun Gong's relationship to Buddhism, the principles of cultivation practice, and the improvement of moral character (xinxing). The book also provides illustrations and explanations of the exercises and meditation.

The main body of teachings is articulated in the book Zhuan Falun, published in Chinese in January 1995. The book is divided into nine "lectures", and was based on edited transcriptions of the talks Li gave throughout China in the preceding three years. Falun Gong texts have since been translated into an additional 40 languages.

The Falun Gong teachings use numerous untranslated Chinese religious and philosophical terms, and make frequent allusion to characters and incidents in Chinese folk literature and concepts drawn from Chinese folk religion. This, coupled with the literal translation style of the texts, which imitate the colloquial style of Li's speeches, can make Falun Gong scriptures difficult to approach for Westerners.

=== Symbols ===
The main symbol of the practice is the Falun (Dharma wheel, or Dharmacakra in Sanskrit). In Buddhism, the Dharmacakra represents the completeness of the doctrine. To "turn the wheel of dharma" (Zhuan Falun) means to preach the Buddhist doctrine, and is the title of Falun Gong's main text. Despite the invocation of Buddhist language and symbols, the law wheel as understood in Falun Gong has distinct connotations, and is held to represent the universe. It is conceptualized by an emblem consisting of one large and four small (counter-clockwise) swastika symbols, representing the Buddha, and four small Taiji (yin-yang) symbols of the Daoist tradition.

=== Dharma-ending period ===
Numerous scholars including David Ownby, Helen Farley, Benjamin Penny, and David Palmer characterized some aspects of Li's teachings as apocalyptic, including beliefs concerning the destruction and renewal of human civilization as a consequence of moral decline. Li taught a general worldview that hundreds of thousands or even millions of years ago, past civilisations reached extremely advanced levels of technology, material and artistic development. However, because they abandoned their morals, the "Awakened Ones" destroyed these societies, causing science and technology to disappear and civilization to collapse, leaving only a few survivors to rebuild society from the Stone Age. Li claimed that, after making a careful assessment, he concluded that such cycles of destruction and renewal had occurred 81 times in Earth's history. Li also taught that there was physical evidence of prehistoric civilizations, including a 2-billion-year-old natural nuclear fission reactor in Oklo, Gabon, which he presented as evidence that an advanced civilization had used nuclear energy on Earth at that time.

David Ownby wrote that Li asserted that there have been "certain signs" that made him predict that another cycle of the destruction and renewal was "imminent". Li adopted these apocalyptic ideas from "traditional strains of Chinese apocalyptic thinking," present in popularized versions of Buddhism and Daoism and scriptures of certain sectarian groups from the late imperial period. Ownby noted that these ideas and symbols have been widely known throughout China, "in the same way that the teachings of the biblical Book of Revelations are generally known in the West." However, his impression was that Li did not stress apocalyptic themes before the Chinese government's suppression although Li had "certainly made more than passing reference to such themes".

In 1998, after Li had left China, Ownby observed that Li made changes to Falun Gong including instructing his followers to make his book Zhuan Falun "serve as the focus of Falun Gong practice" and that practitioners were advised to read the book daily. Ownby and Palmer describe Li's book Zhuan Falun as containing demonic and apocalyptic themes. Ownby notes that, compared with other qigong texts, Zhuan Falun was distinctive in the emphasis it placed on these ideas that other texts merely hinted at.

Nearly a year after China's crackdown on Falun Gong, sociologist Andrew Junker described a shift in Li's teachings, stating that "there was a transition to a religious and millenarian interpretation, a sign that the end of days are here."

Penny noted that Li taught that we are currently living in the "last days of Last Havoc", a period marking the final stage of evolution of the universe. The current era is also described in Falun Gong's teachings as the "Fa rectification" period (zhengfa, which might also be translated as "to correct the dharma"), a time of cosmic transition and renewal. The process of Fa rectification is necessitated by the moral decline and degeneration of life in the universe, and in the post-1999 context, the persecution of Falun Gong by the Chinese government has come to be viewed as a tangible symptom of this moral decay. Through the process of the Fa rectification, life will be reordered according to the moral and spiritual quality of each, with good people being saved and ascending to higher spiritual planes, and bad ones being eliminated or cast down. In this paradigm, Li assumes the role of rectifying the Dharma by disseminating through his moral teachings.

According to scholar Helen Farley, Li often makes references to the "Dharma-ending period" of "the apocalypse" or the "end times" and taught that contemporary civilisation will be "annihilated" because people today had failed to maintain moral standards. Farley notes that Li promised salvation to those who embraced Falun Dafa and particularly blames science for contributing to the decline of morality in contemporary society by spreading what he considers a "faulty understanding of humanity, nature, and matter".

French sociologist Palmer notes that a dominant theme of Li's writings are about the forces that bring about an apocalyptic event or the "end of the Dharma" (Mo Fa, 末法), which is marked by "unprecedented moral degeneration". Li teaches that today's society has entered this period of moral decline, in which humanity's deviation from moral principles have contributed to its decline and is associated with destructive transformations that occur at the end of the cosmic cycle. Racial mixing, homosexuality, modern science, and feminism are viewed by Li as aspects of moral decline.

Some scholars, such as Maria Hsia Chang and Susan Palmer, have described Li's rhetoric about the "Fa rectification" and providing salvation "in the final period of the Last Havoc" as apocalyptic. However, Benjamin Penny, a professor of Chinese history at the Australian National University, argues that Li's teachings are better understood in the context of a "Buddhist notion of the cycle of the Dharma or the Buddhist law". Richard Gunde wrote that, unlike apocalyptic groups in the West, Falun Gong does not fixate on death or the end of the world, and instead "has a simple, innocuous ethical message". Despite warning that extreme moral degeneration will lead to the destruction of civilization, Li Hongzhi does not discuss a fixed "time of reckoning".

According to journalist Danny Schechter, Li dismissed end-of-the-world types of apocalyptic predictions for the year 1999, and was quoted to have said at a lecture that "I can proclaim here to everyone in all earnestness that all of those so-called catastrophes of the earth or of the universe and things of this kind in the year 1999 simply do not exist." In 2001, Schechter reported that Falun Gong practitioners have told him that Li had always discouraged theories predicting doomsday scenarios common in many religious communities. According to journalist Ian Johnson in 2005, Falun Gong adherents do not believe the world's end was imminent.

However, Heather Kavan, who conducted a year of fieldwork with Falun Gong practitioners in New Zealand, observed that adherents tended to be "evasive about their beliefs". According to Kavan, Li had explicitly forbidden practitioners from discussing what he refers to as "high level things" with non-practitioners, instructing them instead to give the impression that they were simply practicing exercises. In her 2008 ethnographic research, Kavan noted that the exact timing of the apocalypse was uncertain because Li had claimed he could use his mystical powers to delay it. However, practitioners interviewed by Kavan expected the apocalypse to come within 25 years, and some believed that those left behind would "suffer horribly".

In 2000, journalist Craig S. Smith interviewed a practitioner who stated that Li taught that human civilization had been destroyed 81 times and that another "round of destruction" might be coming. However, that same interviewee stated that it doesn't mean that the sudden change he expects to happen will be a catastrophe but rather a "sudden change that will be good for good people, but bad for bad people".

In 2002, Penny wrote that, according to Li's writings, there were hints to how the "last days" or "end times" will materialize. Li had written that during the Dharma-ending period, a "strange disease" would afflict mankind and that it would be difficult for "even one out of ten households to survive". Penny also quoted Li as claiming he will not be teaching the Fa for very long, that other religions would become "no longer effective", and "the only way out is to attain the Fa quickly". Penny interpreted these teachings as presenting Falun Gong as the "only path to salvation", supplanting existing religions.

A 2024 New York Times investigation reported that many practitioners viewed the opportunity of performing in Shen Yun as being a sacred honor, as Li had stated that these shows are "part of his quest to save humanity from a coming apocalypse". The religious significance of this mission was also evident in the experience of Shen Yun dancers. In 2026, a former Shen Yun dancer told Radio France Internationale (RFI) that, as children, they were taught through Falun Gong teachings that it was their purpose to "save sentient beings" as the "apocalypse" was coming.

==== Salvation ====
According to Palmer, Li claimed he had appeared not only to save humanity but also to "rectify" all life and matter in the universe. He stated that he had "essentially rectified" and saved the universe, with only humanity remaining as the final superficial layer requiring attention. Li further taught that he possess the "Force (gong)" that is "entirely capable" of stopping the layer from exploding or breaking apart, and that because of him, certain prophesied phenomena no longer had to occur. Li taught that before he accomplished his mission, the universe did not have a future. Palmer notes that, in 1994, Li stated that the destruction of the universe was imminent, while by 1997 he claimed to have "already prevented" such destruction. Li also taught that Falun gong is the only means for salvation, and that the other orthodox religions are no longer paid attention by the gods as they have lost the spirit of the "true Dharma".

Li rejected particular predictions of doomsday, including a predicted 1999 catastrophe, while also teaching that predestined catastrophic events can be prevented or altered because of his Fa-rectification. In 2002, Falun Gong sources relayed a message from Li stating that, "Master [Li] has spread Dafa for ten years. Even in the human world, predestinations have changed. The comet catastrophe predestined in history is no more, the third world war has been averted, and the peril in 1999 from the cycle of formation-stasis-degeneration-destruction of Heaven and Earth will never recur."

Human Rights Watch has described Falun Gong as containing clear salvationist and apocalyptic ideas, noting Li's claim that salvation could be attained through the practice of a "righteous way" and his teaching that human civilization has undergone 81 cycles of "complete annihilation" and renewal.

Benjamin Penny argued that Li's teachings are clearly "intended" as a path to salvation. Li first diagnoses the current condition of humanity as a fallen state and then provides his "prescription". By following Li's teachings, practitioners will receive protection from Li's "law bodies" and be on track to re-align themselves with the "characteristics of the universe". For Penny, returning to "the origin", regaining the status of Gods, Daos, or Buddhas, and achieving Consummation "all amount essentially to the same thing".

=== Extraterrestrials ===
According to Yanfei Sun, Falun Gong incorporates beliefs about extraterrestrials and prehistorical civilizations; these parascientific beliefs had come to China from the West at the time that Falun Gong was developing.

Benjamin Penny documented that Li's narrative on aliens developed considerably between 1995 and early 1999. In 1995, Penny noted that Li claimed that extraterrestrials were "piloting flying saucers" around the universe and possessed technology more advanced than that of humans. By early 1999, Li's statements reflected a much more developed narrative in which he claimed human scientific achievements were actually derived from the extraterrestrials. He further claimed that extraterrestrials frequently visited Earth and were engaged in a plot to impregnate human women to create a new hybrid race. Li also stated that governments, particularly secret agencies within the U.S. government, were already aware of the exterrestrials' visitations and plans.

Li had made claims that aliens were responsible for scientific inventions through the manipulation of scientists since around the 1900s. In a 1999 interview with Time, Li attributed the invention of computers and airplanes to extraterrestrials, as well as war and violence. He also claimed aliens were attempting to replace humans through a cloning process, in which human bodies would be cloned with no soul, so that the aliens can replace the soul and inhabit human bodies (which to him are perfect). Li further claimed that U.S. technology had already detected some extraterrestrials and that they already controlled humans in terms of "both culture and spirit". However observers Graeme Lang and Lu Yunfeng considered his position on aliens fairly inconsistent.

Li Hongzhi additionally alleged that extraterrestrials disguise themselves as humans. He had also claimed that extraterrestrials have sought to corrupt and manipulate humanity, including through the use of modern technology. According to an ABC investigation, while some practitioners stated that this was metaphorical, a former member said she was taught it as literal truth. Farley and Palmer also report that Li claimed that aliens assigned serial numbers to humans capable of using computers and that aliens has been known to abduct humans and use them as pets on their planet.

=== Modern science ===
Li teaches a religious cosmology that he presents as a higher or ultimate science, claiming that it could explain realities beyond the reach of conventional science. According to Li, the universe is composed of multiple dimensions, with Earth being the "lowest" of them. He teaches that highly advanced civilizations existed on Earth millions of years ago, but claims scientists ignore this reality because they follow the theory of evolution, which he criticizes as a "superstition". Li also claimed that modern medicine doesn't truly cure diseases as illnesses are rooted in karma and not in biology. He also taught that the gods had opened up holes in the ozone layer above Antarctica to help ventilate the Earth's "poisoned and polluted" air. Li said some of the energy (gong) emitted by qigong masters can be detected by current scientific devices, but some cannot because such devices haven't been developed yet. Li's views on extraterrestrials are closely connected to his broader criticism of modern science, in which he characterized as "an enemy" to human morals and claimed that extraterrestrials were primarily behind its creation.

Ownby argued that due to the iconic status of science enjoyed in modern Chinese society, Li repeatedly returns to the subject in his teachings. Palmer and Farley notes that Li did not simply reject modern science outright, but characterized it as real yet extremely limited, and that Falun Gong should supplant it. He portrayed mainstream science as a primitive, rudimentary tool used by "ordinary people" that remained ignorant of the true nature of the universe. In contrast, Li framed Falun Gong as a supreme science, suggesting adherents were not abandoning science but embracing a superior form of knowledge that contained the ultimate truth.

Several scholars and journalists have similarly observed Li's use of the authority and symbolism of science to frame his spiritual ideas as scientific while claiming Falun Gong is a form of knowledge that surpasses modern science. Ian Johnson writes that Falun Gong emphasizes that it is compatible with sciences, but like other qigong, frames it as a kind of "Über-science”. Johnson notes that Li's writings refer to extraterrestrial life and the cosmos while also preaching about qigong practitioners' ability to surpass the limits of current scientific knowledge. Scholar Benjamin Penny noted that scientific terminology is pervasive in Li's writings, situating Falun Gong within the modern scientific world familiar to its educated audience.

Richard Shepard argued that there were "brave" scientists who supported Li's claim that evolution was wrong. He also opined that Falun Gong was "far from being anti-science" as Li uses the "symbolic power of science" to present his ideas as "scientific" while simultaneously attempting to "call into question scientific knowledge" itself. In doing so, Li connects Daoism, Buddhism, and modern science by linking molecular cells to the Daoist idea of the body as a “small universe” and the Buddhist belief that a grain of sand contains 3,000 worlds. Journalist Danny Schechter noted that Falun Gong draws on physics and other sciences to emphasize the importance of energy over matter in understanding the dimensions where we live.

Helen Farley notes that the first line of the 1995 edition of Zhuan Falun introduces the scripture as the "ultimate science". She argues that Falun Gong is distinctive because, unlike most belief systems, it explicitly appeals to science as being the foundation of its claims while simultaneously portraying modern science as an "inferior derivative of religion". Farley writes that Li "readily" dismisses those who doubt his claims, portraying modern science as ignorant of the real truths of the universe and warned others that "all will be lost" unless the world listens to him. Farley notes that Li himself "never follows any scientific principles in his deliberations" and often distorts scientific facts "for his own purposes". Farley characterize Li's claims about phenomena beyond the understanding of modern science as "parascientific", noting that they had been poorly received by the scientific community in China and abroad.

In a 1999 interview with Time, Li stated that he believed that if aliens did not already replace humanity, he predicts a future human society that was "quite terrifying" and would ultimately destroy itself. He said that industrial pollution has caused today's climate abnormalities and contaminated the air, water, soil, and food in ways humans cannot reverse and modern science cannot fully measure. He claimed he foresaw a future where "human limbs become deformed", joints could no longer move, and internal organs would become "dysfunctional". He said that modern science does not understand this and claimed that the only person in the entire world who does understands is him alone. Li states that he is not against the general public in knowing the truth but said they could not comprehend it so why he focused on teaching practitioners. He argued that it was pointless for the general public to know because they could not free themselves from "science and from their concepts".

Scholar David Ownby writes that one of Li Hongzhi's "favorite themes" of discussion involves modern science. He claimed that a significant aspect of what makes Falun Gong appealing, especially to Chinese intellectuals, lies in "its promise to wed modern science to Chinese traditions" and produce a science that would "supplant" existing scientific knowledge. Ownby however notes that Li's discussions of and challenges to modern science had struck a chord with many Chinese intellectuals who had taken up Falun Gong practice. Ownby identified several strategies that Li utilized to advance his view that modern science was flawed including making references to purported “parascientific research” and alleged archaeological findings that challenge the theory of evolution.

According to Benjamin Penny, Li held a suspicious attitude towards modern science. Li stated that if science and technology continued to advance rapidly, then "star wars will break out in the cosmos" and that the gods, Buddha and Daos would not permit this as they "cannot allow humans to bring turmoil to the cosmos".

== Categorization ==
Scholars describe Falun Gong as a new religious movement. (Note: "New religious movement": Sun, Yanfei (2026). Religious Change in Post-Mao China: Toward a New Sociology of Religion. The University of Chicago Press. pp. 123–138. ISBN 978-0-226-84587-6.; Junker, Andrew (2019). Becoming Activists in Global China: Social Movements in the Chinese Diaspora. Cambridge University Press. pp. 23–24, 33, 119, 207. ISBN 978-1-108-65589-7.; Barker, Eileen. 2016. Revisionism and Diversification in New Religious Movements, cf. 142–143. Taylor & Francis. ISBN 978-1317063612; Oliver, Paul. 2012. New Religious Movements: A Guide for the Perplexed, pp. 81–84. Bloomsbury Academic. ISBN 978-1441125538; Hexham, Irving. 2009. Pocket Dictionary of New Religious Movements, pp. 49, 71. InterVarsity Press. ISBN 978-0830876525; Clarke, Peter. 2004. Encyclopedia of New Religious Movements. Taylor & Francis. ISBN 978-1134499694; Ownby, David (2004). "The Falun Gong: A New Religious Movement in Post-Mao China". In Lewis, James R.; Petersen, Jesper Aagaard (eds.). Controversial New Religions (1st ed.). New York: Oxford University Press. pp. 195–196. ISBN 978-0-19-515682-9.) While commonly described by scholars as a new religious movement, adherents may reject this term. Yuezhi Zhao describes Falun Gong as "a multifaceted and totalizing movement that means different things to different people, ranging from a set of physical exercises and a praxis of transformation to a moral philosophy and a new knowledge system."

In the cultural context of China, Falun Gong is generally described either as a system of qigong, or a type of "cultivation practice" (xiulian), a process by which an individual seeks spiritual perfection, often through both physical and moral conditioning. Varieties of cultivation practice are found throughout Chinese history, spanning Buddhist, Daoist, and Confucian traditions. Benjamin Penny writes "the best way to describe Falun Gong is as a cultivation system. Cultivation systems have been a feature of Chinese life for at least 2,500 years." Qigong practices can also be understood as a part of a broader tradition of "cultivation practice".

In the West, Falun Gong is frequently classified as a religion on the basis of its theological and moral teachings, its concerns with spiritual cultivation and transformation, and its extensive body of scripture. Falun Gong practitioners themselves have sometimes disavowed this classification, however. This rejection reflects the relatively narrow definition of "religion" in contemporary China. According to David Ownby, religion in China has been defined since 1912 to refer to "world-historical faiths" that have "well-developed institutions, clergy, and textual traditions"—namely, Buddhism, Daoism, Islam, Protestantism, and Catholicism. Moreover, if Falun Gong had described itself as a religion in China, it likely would have invited immediate suppression. These historical and cultural circumstances notwithstanding, the practice has often been described as a form of Chinese religion.

== Media influence operations ==
The performance arts group Shen Yun and the media organization The Epoch Times are the major outreach organizations of Falun Gong. Both promote the spiritual and political teachings of Falun Gong. They and a variety of other organizations such as New Tang Dynasty Television (NTD) operate as extensions of Falun Gong. These extensions promote the new religious movement and its teachings. In the case of The Epoch Times, they also promote conspiracy theories such as QAnon and anti-vaccine misinformation (Note: Anti-vaccine misinformation: Callery & Goddard 2021; Waldman 2021; Alba, Davey (23 August 2019). "Facebook Bans Ads From The Epoch Times". The New York Times. ISSN 0362-4331. Archived from the original on 17 March 2021.; Gartenberg, Chaim (23 August 2019). "Epoch Times banned from advertising after sneaking pro-Trump propaganda onto Facebook". The Verge. Archived from the original on 8 March 2021.; Perrone, Alessio; Loucaides, Darren (10 March 2022). "A key source for Covid-skeptic movements, the Epoch Times yearns for a global audience". Coda Media. Archived from the original on 13 March 2022.) and far-right politics in both Europe and the United States. Around the time of the 2016 United States presidential election, The Epoch Times began running articles supportive of Donald Trump and critical of his opponents. Falun Gong extensions have also been active in promoting the European radical right.

The exact financial and structural connections between Falun Gong, Shen Yun and The Epoch Times remains unclear. According to NBC News:

The Epoch Media Group, along with Shen Yun, a dance troupe known for its ubiquitous advertising and unsettling performances, make up the outreach effort of Falun Gong, a relatively new spiritual practice that combines ancient Chinese meditative exercises, mysticism and often ultraconservative cultural worldviews. Falun Gong's founder has referred to Epoch Media Group as "our media", and the group's practice heavily informs The Epoch Times' coverage, according to former employees who spoke with NBC News. The Epoch Times, digital production company NTD and the heavily advertised dance troupe Shen Yun make up the nonprofit network that Li calls "our media". Financial documents paint a complicated picture of more than a dozen technically separate organizations that appear to share missions, money and executives. Though the source of their revenue is unclear, the most recent financial records from each organization paint a picture of an overall business thriving in the Trump era.

According to scholar James R. Lewis writing in 2018, Falun Gong adherents have attempted to control English Wikipedia articles covering the group and articles related to it. Lewis highlights Falun Gong's extensive internet presence, and how editors who have to date contributed to English Wikipedia entries associated with Falun Gong to the point where "Falun Gong followers and/or sympathizers de facto control the relevant pages on Wikipedia", and how this is particularly important for Falun Gong as an organization due to the search engine optimization results of these entries, and how the entries can influence other media entities. Lewis notes also how this fits in as part of Falun Gong's general media strategy, such as Falun Gong media like The Epoch Times, New Tang Dynasty, Sound of Hope Radio, and, as Lewis discusses, the Rachlin media group. Lewis reports that the Rachlin media group is the Falun Gong's de facto PR firm operated by Gail Rachlin, spokesperson for the Falun Dafa Information Centre. Lewis says that Amnesty International does not independently verify its reports from Falun Gong groups, accepting material directly from Falun Gong organizations as fact. According to Lewis, "[Falun Gong] has thus been able to influence other media via its presence on the web, through its direct press releases, and through its own media."

A 2024 New York Times investigation alleged that Shen Yun routinely discouraged performers from seeking medical care for injuries and enforced grueling rehearsal and tour schedules through emotional abuse and manipulation. They report that Shen Yun recruits underage dancers and musicians to work long hours with little pay. Evan Glickman, a percussionist that travelled with Shen Yun for two years, stated that two-thirds of the musicians were students and "That place would not run if they had to pay real musicians, like every other organization in the country does." A violinist, Eugene Liu, started working for Shen Yun at 15 and stayed with the group for 2 years, but never made more than $300 a month despite working on over 200 shows.

== Internet circumvention software ==
In the early 2000s, Falun Gong adherents in the United States developed Ultrasurf and Freegate, freeware intended to circumvent Chinese government internet censorship. According to NPR:

Adherents of Falun Gong first developed Ultrasurf nearly two decades ago to get around censors in China and elsewhere. Early on, Ultrasurf seemed a highly promising tool in aiding activists and journalists to talk securely online. It earlier received development money from the State Department and the predecessor agency to USAGM.

A Berkman Klein Center for Internet and Society report on the circumvention landscape in 2007 found Ultrasurf's performance to be "the best of any tool tested in filtering countries, the only tool to display okay speed for both image heavy and simple, text oriented sites." A Wired article described Ultrasurf as "one of the most important free-speech tools on the Internet, used by millions from China to Saudi Arabia."

Beyond China, Freegate gained popularity among Iranian protesters soon after its Farsi version was introduced in July 2008. During the Green Movement protests surrounding the 2009 election, its servers were overwhelmed by Iranian Internet users.

In 2010, the United States Department of State under the Obama administration offered a $1.5 million grant to the Global Internet Freedom Consortium founded by Falun Gong adherents that developed Ultrasurf and Freegate, drawing opposition from the Chinese government. A 2011 Center for a New American Security report recognized the need for the US government to fund high-performing technologies like Ultrasurf and Freegate, despite the stress it might cause on the U.S.-China relationship, but recommended the US government diversify the technologies it funds.

In recent years, Ultrasurf has been a major point of contention in large part because it is not open source, meaning that it cannot be reviewed by outside engineers for vulnerabilities and back doors. Additionally, as reported by The Verge, since the 2000s, the software has drawn criticism "for its content filtering (which blocks pornography) and its ability to surveil user traffic, which is often impossible by design in competing tools".

Although it receives public funding, both its creators and owners have rejected attempts at allowing outside parties to review its effectiveness and utility. A 2020 audit by the U.S. State Department concluded that "censoring Ultrasurf nation-wide would have been trivial for a moderate-budget adversary".

After conservative documentary filmmaker Michael Pack was appointed CEO of the U.S. Agency for Global Media (USAGM) during the Trump administration in 2020, Pack tied up $19 million in federal funds from other projects for the Ultrasurf project. Numerous other projects, including other secure communication projects, lost funding during this period. Ultrasoft eventually received $249,000 of the allotted funds. Once receiving funding, only "four people abroad used it to access Voice of America and Radio Free Asia, a key purpose for its subsidy" during December 2020 and January 2021.

Two days before U.S. President Joe Biden's 2021 inauguration, Pack appointed a columnist from the Epoch Times to the board of directors for the networks his agency oversaw. This columnist had claimed the January 6 insurrection was a "false flag operation". During his eight months in office, Pack regularly appeared in the Epoch Times, where he also discussed Ultrasurf.

As of 2020, Pack, along with other USAGM officials he did not fire during his time there, faced a criminal inquiry in response to whistleblower allegations that the "concerted effort to divert funds to the Falun Gong software Ultrasurf was a criminal conspiracy".

== Organization ==
Spiritual authority is vested exclusively in the teachings of Li Hongzhi. Volunteer "assistants" or "contact persons" do not hold authority over other practitioners, regardless of how long they have practiced Falun Gong. Li stipulates that practitioners of Falun Gong cannot collect money or charge fees, conduct healings, or teach or interpret doctrine for others. There is no system of membership within the practice and no rituals of worship. Falun Gong operates through a global, networked, and largely virtual online community. In particular, electronic communications, email lists and a collection of websites are the primary means of coordinating activities and disseminating Li's teachings.

Outside Mainland China, the organisation stated that they have followers in more than 100 countries. Li's teachings are principally spread through the Internet. In most mid- to large-sized cities, Falun Gong practitioners organize regular group meditation or study sessions in which they practice Falun Gong exercises and read Li's writings. The exercise and meditation sessions are described as informal groups of practitioners who gather in public parks—usually in the morning—for one to two hours. Group study sessions typically take place in the evenings in private residences or university or high school classrooms, and are described by David Ownby as "the closest thing to a regular 'congregational experience'" that Falun Gong offers. Individuals who are too busy, isolated, or who simply prefer solitude may elect to practice privately. When there are expenses to be covered (such as for the rental of facilities for large-scale conferences), costs are borne by self-nominated and relatively affluent individual members of the community.

=== Within China ===
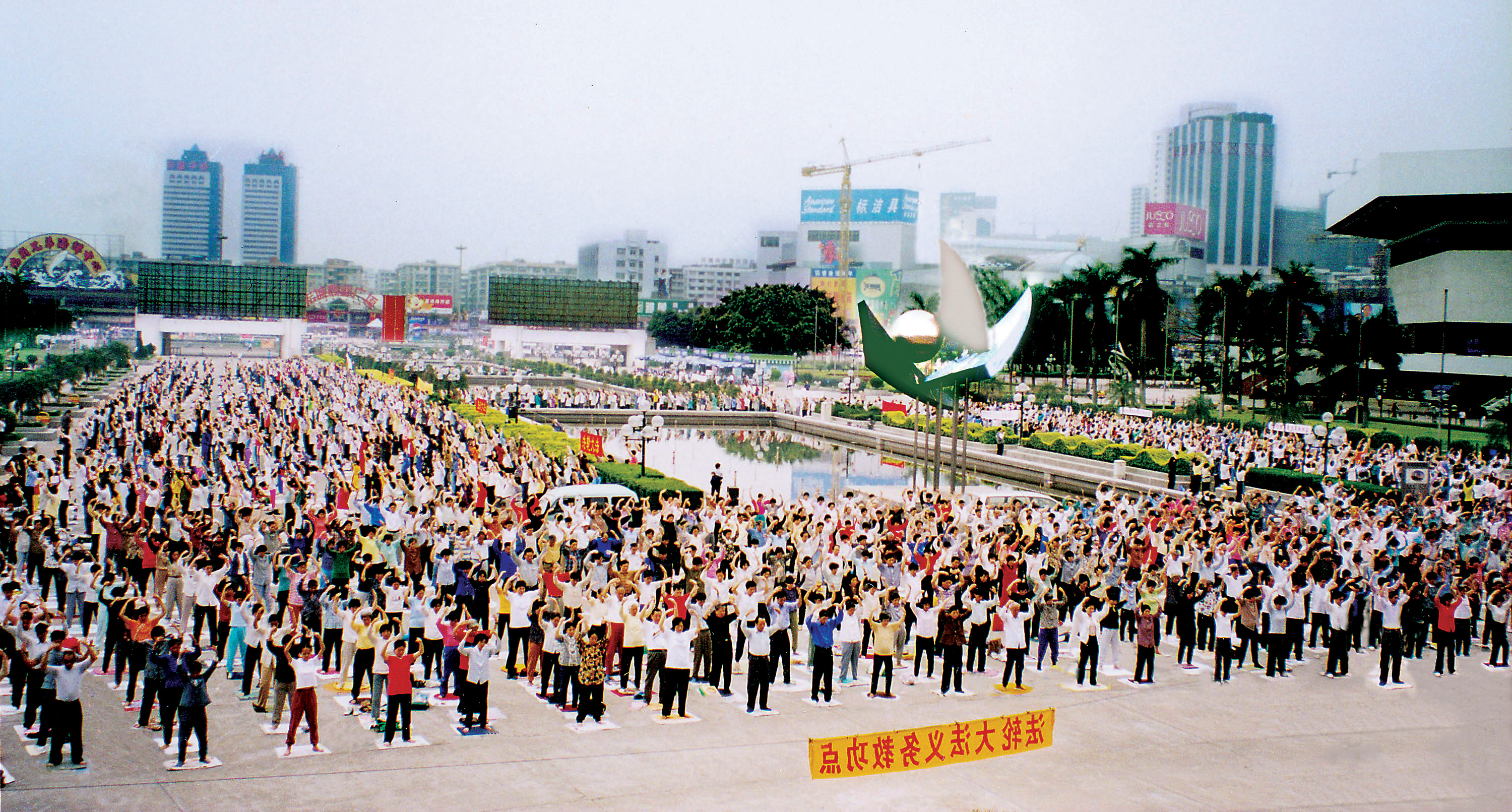
Morning Falun Dafa exercises in Guangzhou

In 1993, the Beijing-based Falun Dafa Research Society was accepted as a branch of the state-run China Qigong Research Society (CQRS), which oversaw the administration of the country's various qigong schools, and sponsored activities and seminars. As per the requirements of the CQRS, Falun Gong was organized into a nationwide network of assistance centers, "main stations", "branches", "guidance stations", and local practice sites, mirroring the structure of the qigong society or even of the CCP itself. Falun Gong assistants were self-selecting volunteers who taught the exercises, organized events, and disseminated new writings from Li Hongzhi. The Falun Dafa Research Society provided advice to students on meditation techniques, translation services, and coordination for the practice nationwide.

Following its departure from the CQRS in 1996, Falun Gong came under increased scrutiny from authorities and responded by adopting a more decentralized and loose organizational structure. In 1997, the Falun Dafa Research Society was formally dissolved, along with the regional "main stations". Yet practitioners continued to organize themselves at local levels, being connected through electronic communications, interpersonal networks and group exercise sites. Both Falun Gong sources and Chinese government sources claimed that there were some 1,900 "guidance stations" and 28,263 local Falun Gong exercise sites nationwide by 1999, though they disagree over the extent of vertical coordination among these organizational units. In response to the persecution that began in 1999, Falun Gong was driven underground, the organizational structure grew yet more informal within China, and the internet took precedence as a means of connecting practitioners.

Following the persecution of Falun Gong in 1999, Chinese authorities sought to portray Falun Gong as a hierarchical and well-funded organization. James Tong writes that it was in the government's interest to portray Falun Gong as highly organized in order to justify its repression of the group: "The more organized the Falun Gong could be shown to be, then the more justified the regime's repression in the name of social order was." He concluded that Party's claims lacked "both internal and external substantiating evidence", and that despite the arrests and scrutiny, the authorities never "credibly countered Falun Gong rebuttals".

=== Dragon Springs compound ===
Falun Gong operates out of Dragon Springs, a 160-hectare (400-acre) compound located in Deerpark, New York. Falun Gong founder and leader Li Hongzhi resides near the compound, along with "hundreds" of Falun Gong adherents. Members of Falun Gong extension Shen Yun live and rehearse in the compound, which also contains schools and temples. The compound is registered as a church, Dragon Springs Buddhist, which gives it tax exemptions and greater privacy. Scholar Andrew Junker noted that in 2019, near Dragon Springs, in Middletown, was an office for the Falun Gong media extension The Epoch Times, which published a special local edition.

The compound has been a point of controversy among former residents. According to NBC News:

[F]our former compound residents and former Falun Gong practitioners who spoke to NBC News ... said that life in Dragon Springs is tightly controlled by Li, that internet access is restricted, the use of medicines is discouraged, and arranged relationships are common. Two former residents on visas said they were offered to be set up with U.S. residents at the compound.

Tiger Huang, a former Dragon Springs resident who was on a United States student visa from Taiwan, said she was set up on three dates on the compound, and she believed her ability to stay in the United States was tied to the arrangement.

"The purpose of setting up the dates was obvious", Huang said. Her now-husband, a former Dragon Springs resident, confirmed the account. Huang said she was told by Dragon Springs officials her visa had expired and was told to go back to Taiwan after months of dating a nonpractitioner in the compound. She later learned that her visa had not expired when she was told to leave the country.

Acquired by Falun Gong in 2000, the site is closed to visitors and features guarded gates, has been a point of contention for some Deer Park residents concerned. In 2019, Falun Gong requested to expand the site, wishing to add a 920-seat concert hall, a new parking garage, a wastewater treatment plant and a conversion of meditation space into residential space large enough to bring the total residential capacity to 500 people. These plans met with opposition from the Delaware Riverkeeper Network regarding the wastewater treatment facility and the elimination of local wetlands, impacting local waterways such as the Basher Kill and Neversink River. Local residents opposed the expansion because it would increase traffic and reduce the rural character of the area. Falun Gong adherents living in the area have claimed that they have experienced discrimination from local residents.

After visiting in 2019, Junker noted that "the secrecy of Dragon Springs was obvious and a source of tension for the town". Junker adds that Dragon Springs's website says its restricted access is for security reasons, and that the site claims the compound contains orphans and refugees.

== Demography ==
Prior to July 1999, official Chinese government estimates placed the number of Falun Gong practitioners at 70 million nationwide, rivalling membership in the CCP. By the time of the persecution on 22 July 1999, most Chinese government numbers said the population of Falun Gong was between 2 and 3 million, though some publications maintained an estimate of 40 million. The Falun Gong organization estimated in the same period that the total number of practitioners in China was between 70 and 80 million, though sociologist David A. Palmer notes these numbers were likely highly inflated and gives a more reasonable estimate of 10 million. Other sources have estimated the Falun Gong population in China to have peaked between 10 and 70 million practitioners. The number of Falun Gong practitioners still practicing in China today is difficult to confirm, though the NGO Freedom House estimated in 2017 that 7 to 20 million continue to practice privately. This estimate is based on data from the Chinese government, Falun Gong website Minghui, U.S. congressional reports, and other academic sources.

Demographic surveys conducted in China in 1998 found a population that was mostly female and elderly. Of 34,351 Falun Gong practitioners surveyed, 27% were male and 73% female. Only 38% were under 50 years old. Falun Gong attracted a range of other individuals, from young college students to bureaucrats, intellectuals and Party officials. Surveys in China from the 1990s found that between 23 and 40% of practitioners held university degrees at the college or graduate level—several times higher than the general population.

Falun Gong is practiced by tens, and possibly hundreds, of thousands outside China, with the largest communities found in Taiwan and North American cities with large Chinese populations, such as New York and Toronto. Demographic surveys by Palmer and Ownby in these communities found that 90% of practitioners are ethnic Chinese. The average age was approximately 40. Among survey respondents, 56% were female and 44% male; 80% were married. The surveys found the respondents to be highly educated: 9% held PhDs, 34% had master's degrees, and 24% had a bachelor's degree.

As of 2008, the most commonly reported reasons for being attracted to Falun Gong were intellectual content, cultivation exercises, and health benefits. Non-Chinese Falun Gong practitioners tend to fit the profile of "spiritual seekers"—people who had tried a variety of qigong, yoga, or religious practices before finding Falun Gong. According to sociologist Richard Madsen, some Falun Gong practitioners with scientific backgrounds, including Chinese scientists with doctorates from American universities, have argued that concepts from modern physics and biology provide a scientific basis for their beliefs. From their point of view, "Falun Dafa is knowledge rather than religion, a new form of science rather than faith".

== History inside China ==
Falun Gong developed during China's qigong fever. By the late 1970s, the Chinese government had fully adopted scientism as their guideline for national development. At the time, there were also optimism around qigong claims of miracle cancer cures and paranormal abilities. Both government and military figures held hope that qigong could lead to a new "Chinese science" that can help China regain both its "traditions and dignity" while becoming a global scientific leader. Consequently, the government legitimized the study of qigong and established the All-China Qigong Scientific Research Society in 1981.

In the 1980s and 1990s, Qigong practice had become a national phenomenon and people would gather in parks and other public places to practice qigong. Some gatherings hosted thousands of people. Qigong masters traveled around the country giving lectures, providing training, and establishing networks of qigong practice. During the period of qigong fever, there was a fierce ideological divide within China on whether qigong was a revolutionary science or a dangerous pseudoscience. The debate centered on "somatic science" - the belief that the practice of qigong could unlock latent extrasensory perception (ESP) and paranormal abilities in the human body.

In 1988, qigong masters were unable to prove having "Exceptional Functions" to high-level investigators which included scientists from the Chinese Academy of Sciences and an American delegation from the Committee for the Scientific Investigation of Claims of the Paranormal (CSICOP). A network of scientists and journalists began to campaign against qigong, and the media published articles that attacked many qigong masters as "quacks" and comparing qigong to cults.

The first few years of Falun Gong coincided with a period of growing criticism of qigong as being fraudulent. David Ownby wrote that critics of qigong gained the "upper hand" in influencing the government by the early 1990s. Palmer noted that prospects for the qigong movement worsened by the mid 90s with loss of support in both scientific and political circles when it became apparent that the scientific revolution that qigong had promised seemed unlikely to occur.

=== 1992–1996 ===
Li Hongzhi introduced Falun Gong to the public on 13 May 1992, in Changchun, Jilin Province. Several months later, in September 1992, Falun Gong was admitted as a branch of qigong under the administration of the state-run China Qigong Scientific Research Society (CQRS). Li was recognized as a qigong master, and was authorized to teach his practice nationwide. According to Benjamin Penny, Li's first public demonstration occurred at the 1992 Oriental Health Expo in Beijing. There it was reported that Li "apparently" helped a paralysed and wheelchair-bound man to walk again, as well as having cured "difficult and complex illnesses of all kinds". The fair's director subsequently announced Falun Gong as being the "star cultivation system". Like many qigong masters at the time, Li toured major cities in China from 1992 to 1994 to teach the practice. He was granted a number of awards by PRC governmental organizations.

According to academic David Ownby, Li became an "instant star of the qigong movement", and Falun Gong was embraced by the government as an effective means of lowering health care costs, promoting Chinese culture, and improving public morality. In December 1992, for instance, Li and several Falun Gong students participated in the Asian Health Expo in Beijing, where he reportedly "received the most praise [of any qigong school] at the fair, and achieved very good therapeutic results", according to the fair's organizer. The event helped cement Li's popularity, and journalistic reports of Falun Gong's healing powers spread. In 1993, Li received a letter of appreciation from the Ministry of Public Security for providing treatment to around 100 police officers injured while on duty.

Falun Gong had differentiated itself from other qigong groups in its emphasis on morality, low cost, and health benefits. It rapidly spread via word-of-mouth, attracting a wide range of practitioners from all walks of life, including numerous members of the Chinese Communist Party.

From 1992 to 1994, Li did charge fees for the seminars he was giving across China, though the fees were considerably lower than those of competing qigong practices, and the local qigong associations received a substantial share. Li justified the fees as being necessary to cover travel costs and other expenses, and on some occasions, he donated the money earned to charitable causes. In 1994, Li ceased charging fees altogether, thereafter stipulating that Falun Gong must always be taught for free, and its teachings made available without charge (including online). Although some observers believe Li continued to earn substantial income through the sale of Falun Gong books, others dispute this, asserting that most Falun Gong books in circulation were bootleg copies.

With the publication of the books Falun Gong and Zhuan Falun, Li made his teachings more widely accessible. Zhuan Falun, published in January 1995 at an unveiling ceremony held in the auditorium of the Ministry of Public Security, became a best-seller in China. With its presentation of Li's religious teachings, Zhuan Falun marked Falun Gong's transition to a new religious movement.

In 1995, Chinese authorities began looking to Falun Gong to solidify its organizational structure and ties to the party-state. Li was approached by the Chinese National Sports Committee, Ministry of Public Health, and China Qigong Science Research Association (CQRS) to jointly establish a Falun Gong association. Li declined the offer. The same year, the CQRS issued a new regulation mandating that all qigong denominations establish a Chinese Communist Party branch. Li again refused.

According to David Ownby, Li Hongzhi left China to reside in the United States in 1995 amid the declining fortunes of the qigong boom, as attitudes toward qigong increasingly turned negative.

Tensions continued to mount between Li and the CQRS in 1996. In the face of Falun Gong's rise in popularity—a large part of which was attributed to its low cost—competing qigong masters accused Li of undercutting them. According to Schechter, the qigong society under which Li and other qigong masters belonged asked Li to hike his tuition, but Li emphasized the need for the teachings to be free of charge.

In March 1996, Falun Gong withdrew from the CQRS in response to mounting disagreements, after which time it operated outside the official sanction of the state. Falun Gong representatives attempted to register with other government entities, but were rebuffed. Li and Falun Gong were then outside the circuit of personal relations and financial exchanges through which masters and their qigong organizations could find a place within the state system, and also the protections this afforded.

=== 1996–1999 ===
Falun Gong's departure from the state-run CQRS corresponded to a wider shift in the government's attitudes towards qigong practices. As qigong's detractors in government grew more influential, authorities began attempting to rein in the growth and influence of these groups, some of which had amassed tens of millions of followers. In the mid-1990s the state-run media began publishing articles critical of qigong.

Falun Gong was initially shielded from the mounting criticism, but following its withdrawal from the CQRS in March 1996, it lost this protection. On 17 June 1996, the Guangming Daily, an influential state-run newspaper, published a polemic against Falun Gong in which its central text, Zhuan Falun, was described as an example of "feudal superstition". The author wrote that the history of humanity is a "struggle between science and superstition", and called on Chinese publishers not to print "pseudo-scientific books of the swindlers". The article was followed by at least twenty more in newspapers nationwide. Soon after, on 24 July, the CCP's Central Propaganda Department banned all publication of Falun Gong books (though the ban was not consistently enforced). The state-administered Buddhist Association of China also began issuing criticisms of Falun Gong, urging lay Buddhists not to take up the practice.

The criticisms of Falun Gong were part of a larger movement opposing qigong organizations in the state-run media. Falun Gong was not the only target of the media criticism, nor the only group to protest, but it was the most mobilized and steadfast response. Thousands of Falun Gong followers wrote to Guangming Daily and to the CQRS to complain against the measures, claiming that they violated Hu Yaobang's 1982 'Triple No' directive, which prohibited the media from either encouraging or criticizing qigong practices. In other instances, Falun Gong practitioners staged peaceful demonstrations outside media or local government offices to request retractions of perceived unfair coverage. Many of Falun Gong's protests against negative media portrayals were successful, resulting in the retraction of several newspaper stories critical of the practice. This contributed to practitioners' belief that the media claims against them were false or exaggerated, and that their stance was justified.

In June 1998, He Zuoxiu, an outspoken critic of qigong and a fierce defender of Marxism, appeared on a talk show on Beijing Television and openly disparaged qigong groups, making particular mention of Falun Gong. Falun Gong practitioners responded with peaceful protests and by lobbying the station for a retraction. The reporter responsible for the program was reportedly fired, and a program favorable to Falun Gong was aired several days later. Falun Gong practitioners also mounted demonstrations at 14 other media outlets.

In 1997, The Ministry of Public Security launched an investigation into whether Falun Gong should be deemed xie jiao (邪教, "heretical teaching"). The report concluded that "no evidence has appeared thus far". The following year, however, on 21 July 1998, the Ministry of Public Security issued Document No. 555, "Notice of the Investigation of Falun Gong". The document asserted that Falun Gong is a "heretical teaching", and mandated that another investigation be launched to seek evidence in support of the conclusion. Falun Gong practitioners reported having phone lines tapped, homes ransacked and raided, and Falun Gong exercise sites disrupted by public security agents.

In this time period, even as criticism of qigong and Falun Gong mounted in some circles, the practice maintained a number of high-profile supporters in the government. In 1998, Qiao Shi, the recently retired chairman of the Standing Committee of the National People's Congress, initiated his own investigation into Falun Gong. After months of investigations, his group concluded that "Falun Gong has hundreds of benefits for the Chinese people and China, and does not have one single bad effect." In May of the same year, China's National Sports Commission launched its own survey of Falun Gong. Based on interviews with over 12,000 Falun Gong practitioners in Guangdong province, they stated that they were "convinced the exercises and effects of Falun Gong are excellent. It has done an extraordinary amount to improve society's stability and ethics."

The practice's founder, Li Hongzhi, was largely absent from the country during the period of rising tensions with the government. In March 1995, Li had left China to first teach his practice in France and then other countries, and in 1998 obtained permanent residency in the United States.

By 1999, estimates provided by the State Sports Commission suggested there were 70 million Falun Gong practitioners in China. An anonymous employee of China's National Sports Commission, was at this time quoted in an interview with U.S. News & World Report as speculating that if 100 million had taken up Falun Gong and other forms of qigong there would be a dramatic reduction of health care costs and that "Premier Zhu Rongji is very happy about that."

=== Tianjin and Zhongnanhai protests ===
By the late 1990s, the Chinese government's relationship to the growing Falun Gong movement had become increasingly tense. Reports of discrimination and surveillance by the Public Security Bureau were escalating, and Falun Gong practitioners were routinely organizing sit-in demonstrations responding to media articles they deemed to be unfair. The conflicting investigations launched by the Ministry of the Public Security on one side and the State Sports Commission and Qiao Shi on the other spoke of the disagreements among China's elites on how to regard the growing practice.

In April 1999, an article critical of Falun Gong was published in Tianjin Normal University's Youth Reader magazine. The article was authored by physicist He Zuoxiu who, as Porter and Gutmann indicate, is a relative of Politburo member and public security secretary Luo Gan. The article cast qigong, and Falun Gong in particular, as superstitious and harmful for youth. Falun Gong practitioners responded by picketing the offices of the newspaper requesting a retraction of the article. Unlike past instances in which Falun Gong protests were successful, on 22 April the Tianjin demonstration was broken up by the arrival of three hundred riot police. Some of the practitioners were beaten, and forty-five arrested. Other Falun Gong practitioners were told that if they wished to appeal further, they needed to take the issue up with the Ministry of Public Security and go to Beijing to appeal.

The Falun Gong community quickly mobilized a response, and on the morning of 25 April, upwards of 10,000 practitioners gathered near the central appeals office to demand an end to the escalating harassment against the movement, and request the release of the Tianjin practitioners. According to Benjamin Penny, practitioners sought redress from the leadership of the country by going to them and, "albeit very quietly and politely, making it clear that they would not be treated so shabbily". They sat or read quietly on the sidewalks surrounding the Zhongnanhai.

Five Falun Gong representatives met with Premier Zhu Rongji and other senior officials to negotiate a resolution. The Falun Gong representatives were assured that the regime supported physical exercises for health improvements and did not consider the Falun Gong to be anti-government.

President Jiang Zemin was alerted to the demonstration by Luo Gan, and was reportedly angered by the audacity of the demonstration—the largest since the 1989 Tiananmen Square protests and massacre. Jiang called for resolute action to suppress the group, and reportedly criticized Premier Zhu for being "too soft" in his handling of the situation. That evening, Jiang composed a letter indicating his desire to see Falun Gong "defeated". In the letter, Jiang expressed concerns over the size and popularity of Falun Gong, and in particular about the large number of senior CCP members found among Falun Gong practitioners. He believed it possible foreign forces were behind Falun Gong's protests (Li Hongzhi had emigrated to the United States), and expressed concern about their use of the internet to coordinate a large-scale demonstration. Jiang also intimated that Falun Gong's moral philosophy was at odds with the atheist values of Marxist–Leninism, and therefore constituted a form of ideological competition.

Jiang is held by Falun Gong to be personally responsible for this decision to persecute Falun Gong. Peerman cited reasons such as suspected personal jealousy of Li Hongzhi; Saich points to Jiang's anger at Falun Gong's widespread appeal, and ideological struggle as causes for the crackdown that followed. Willy Wo-Lap Lam suggests Jiang's decision to suppress Falun Gong was related to a desire to consolidate his power within the Politburo. According to Human Rights Watch, senior officials were far from unified in their support for the crackdown.

After the 1999 anti-Falun Gong campaign, the state imposed stricter controls on the remaining permitted qigong groups. The qigong fever social phenomenon declined as a result.

== Persecution ==
On 20 July 1999, security forces abducted and detained thousands of Falun Gong practitioners who they identified as leaders. Two days later, on 22 July, the PRC Ministry of Civil Affairs outlawed the Falun Dafa Research Society as an illegal organization that was "engaged in illegal activities, advocating superstition and spreading fallacies, hoodwinking people, inciting and creating disturbances, and jeopardizing social stability". The same day, the Ministry of Public Security issued a circular forbidding citizens from practicing Falun Gong in groups, possessing Falun Gong's teachings, displaying Falun Gong banners or symbols, or protesting against the ban.

The aim of the ensuing campaign was to "eradicate" the group through a combination of means which included the publication and distribution of propaganda which denounced it and the imprisonment and coercive thought reform of its practitioners, sometimes resulting in deaths. In October 1999, four months after the imposition of the ban, legislation was passed in order to outlaw "heterodox religions" and sentence Falun Gong devotees to prison terms.

Hundreds of thousands of Falun Gong practitioners are estimated to have been extrajudicially imprisoned, and practitioners who are currently in detention are reportedly subjected to forced labor, psychiatric abuse, torture, and other coercive methods of thought reform at the hands of Chinese authorities. The U.S. Department of State and Congressional-Executive Commission on China cite estimates that as much as half of China's reeducation-through-labor camp population is made up of Falun Gong practitioners. Researcher Ethan Gutmann estimates that Falun Gong practitioners represent an average of 15 to 20 percent of the total "laogai" population, a population which includes practitioners who are currently being held in re-education through labor camps as well as practitioners who are currently being held in prisons and other forms of administrative detention. Former detainees of the labor camp system have reported that Falun Gong practitioners constitute one of the largest groups of prisoners; in some labor camp and prison facilities, they are the majority of the detainees, and they are often said to receive the longest sentences and the worst treatment. A 2013 report on labor reeducation camps by Amnesty International found that in some cases, Falun Gong practitioners "constituted on average from one third to 100 per cent of the total population" of certain camps.

According to Johnson, the campaign against Falun Gong extends to many aspects of society, including the media apparatus, the police force, the military, the education system, and workplaces. An extra-constitutional body, the "610 Office" was created to oversee the effort. Human Rights Watch (2002) commented that families and workplace employees were urged to cooperate with the government. Scholar Andrew Junker noted in 2019 that "Falun Gong ranks as one of, and by some measures perhaps the most, severely persecuted groups in the reform era."

=== Causes ===
Observers have attempted to explain the CCP's rationale for banning Falun Gong as stemming from a variety of factors. Many of these explanations centre on institutional causes, such as Falun Gong's size and popularity, its independence from the state, and internal politics within the Chinese government. Other scholars have noted that Chinese authorities were troubled by Falun Gong's moral and spiritual content, which put it at odds with aspects of the official Marxist ideology. Still others have pointed to China's history of bloody sectarian revolts as a possible factor leading to the crackdown.

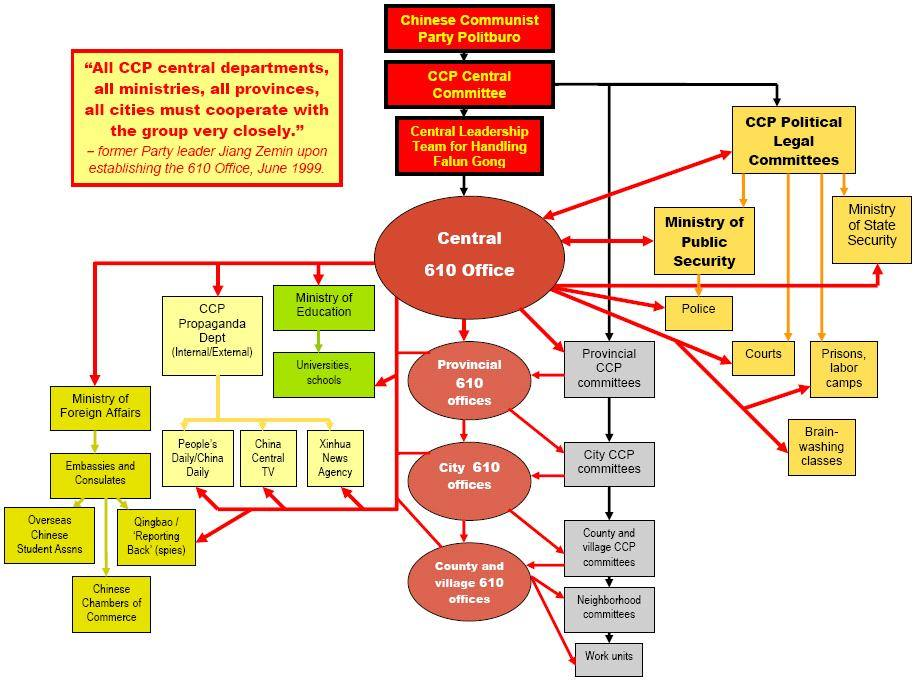
610 Office's organization in China

Xinhua News Agency, the official news organization of the Chinese government, declared that Falun Gong is "opposed to the Communist Party of China and the central government, preaches idealism, theism and feudal superstition". Xinhua also asserted that "the so-called 'truth, kindness and forbearance' principle preached by [Falun Gong] has nothing in common with the socialist ethical and cultural progress we are striving to achieve", and it also argued that it was necessary to crush Falun Gong in order to preserve the "vanguard role and purity" of the Chinese Communist Party. Other articles which appeared in the state-run media in the first days and weeks after the ban was imposed posited that Falun Gong must be defeated because its "theistic" philosophy was at odds with the Marxist–Leninist paradigm and the secular values of materialism.

Willy Wo-Lap Lam writes that Jiang Zemin's campaign against Falun Gong may have been used to promote allegiance to himself; Lam quotes one party veteran as saying "by unleashing a Mao-style movement [against Falun Gong], Jiang is forcing senior cadres to pledge allegiance to his line". The Washington Post reported that sources indicated not all of the Politburo Standing Committee shared Jiang's view that Falun Gong should be eradicated, and Jiang alone made the decision of crackdown.

Human Rights Watch commented that the crackdown on Falun Gong reflects historical efforts by the CCP to eradicate religion, which the government believes is inherently subversive. The Chinese government protects five "patriotic", state-sanctioned religious groups. Unregistered religions that fall outside the state-sanctioned organizations are thus vulnerable to suppression. The Globe and Mail wrote: "any group that does not come under the control of the Party is a threat". Craig S. Smith of The New York Times wrote that the CCP feels increasingly threatened by any belief system that challenges its ideology and has an ability to organize itself. That Falun Gong, whose belief system represented a revival of traditional Chinese religion, was being practiced by a large number of Communist Party members and members of the military was seen as particularly disturbing to Jiang; according to Julia Ching, "Jiang accepts the threat of Falun Gong as an ideological one: spiritual beliefs against militant atheism and historical materialism. He [wished] to purge the government and the military of such beliefs."

Yuezhi Zhao points to several other factors that may have led to a deterioration of the relationship between Falun Gong and the Chinese state and media. These included infighting within China's qigong establishment, the influence of qigong opponents among leaders of China, and the struggles from mid-1996 to mid-1999 between Falun Gong and the Chinese power elite over the status and treatment of the movement. According to Zhao, Falun Gong practitioners have established a "resistance identity"—one that stands against prevailing pursuits of wealth, power, scientific rationality, and "the entire value system associated with China's project of modernization". In China the practice represented an indigenous spiritual and moral tradition, a cultural revitalization movement, and it was a sharp contrast to "Marxism with Chinese characteristics".

Vivienne Shue similarly writes that Falun Gong presented a comprehensive challenge to the CCP's legitimacy. Shue argues that Chinese rulers have historically derived their legitimacy from their claim to possess an exclusive connection to the "Truth". In imperial China, truth was based on a Confucian and Daoist cosmology, where in the case of the Communist Party, the truth is represented by Marxist–Leninism and historical materialism. Falun Gong challenged the Marxist–Leninism paradigm, reviving an understanding which is based on more traditionally Buddhist or Daoist conceptions. David Ownby contends that Falun Gong also challenged the Communist Party's hegemony over the Chinese nationalist discourse: "[Falun Gong's] evocation of a different vision of Chinese tradition and its contemporary values are now so threatening to the state and the party because it denies them the sole right to define the meaning of Chinese nationalism, and it even denies them the sole right to define the meaning of Chineseness."

Maria Chang commented that since the overthrow of the Qin dynasty, "Millenarian movements had exerted a profound impact on the course of Chinese history", culminating in the Chinese Communist Revolution, which brought the CCP to power. Patsy Rahn (2002) describes a paradigm of conflict between Chinese sectarian groups and the rulers who they often challenge. According to Rahn, the history of this paradigm goes back to the collapse of the Han dynasty: "The pattern of a ruling power keeping a watchful eye on sectarian groups, at times threatened by them, at times raising campaigns against them, began as early as the second century and continued throughout the dynastic period, through the Mao era and into the present."

=== Conversion programs ===
According to James Tong, the regime aimed at both coercive dissolution of the Falun Gong and "transformation" of the practitioners. By 2000, the CCP escalated its campaign by sentencing practitioners who returned to Falun Dafa activities after previous detention to "re-education through labor" in an effort to have them renounce their beliefs and "transform" their thoughts. Terms were also arbitrarily extended by police, while some practitioners had ambiguous charges levied against them, such as "disrupting social order", "endangering national security", or "subverting the socialist system". According to Bejesky, the majority of long-term Falun Gong detainees are processed administratively through this system instead of the criminal justice system. Upon completion of their re-education sentences, those practitioners who refused to recant were then incarcerated in "legal education centers" set up by provincial authorities to "transform minds".

Much of the conversion program relied on Mao-style techniques of indoctrination and thought reform, where Falun Gong practitioners were organized to view anti-Falun Gong television programs and enroll in Marxism and materialism study sessions. Traditional Marxism and materialism were the core content of the sessions. According to Yanfei Sun of China's state-run Zhejiang University, conversion programs also included study of Buddhist writings and the Confucian primer The Codes of Conduct for Students and Children.

The government-sponsored image of the conversion process emphasizes psychological persuasion and a variety of "soft-sell" techniques; this is the "ideal norm" in regime reports, according to Tong. Falun Gong reports, on the other hand, depict "disturbing and sinister" forms of coercion against practitioners who fail to renounce their beliefs. Among them are cases of severe beatings; psychological torment, corporal punishment and forced intense, heavy-burden hard labor and stress positions; solitary confinement in squalid conditions; "heat treatment" including burning and freezing; electric shocks delivered to sensitive parts of the body that may result in nausea, convulsions, or fainting; "devastative" forced feeding; sticking bamboo strips into fingernails; deprivation of food, sleep, and use of toilet; rape and gang rape; asphyxiation; and threat, extortion, and termination of employment and student status.

The cases appear verifiable, and the great majority identify (1) the individual practitioner, often with age, occupation, and residence; (2) the time and location that the alleged abuse took place, down to the level of the district, township, village, and often the specific jail institution; and (3) the names and ranks of the alleged perpetrators. Many such reports include lists of the names of witnesses and descriptions of injuries, Tong says. The publication of "persistent abusive, often brutal behavior by named individuals with their official title, place, and time of torture" suggests that there is no official will to cease and desist such activities.

=== Deaths ===
Due to the difficulty in corroborating reports of torture deaths in China, estimates of the number of Falun Gong practitioners who have been killed as a result of the persecution vary widely. In 2009, The New York Times reported that, according to human rights groups, the repressions had claimed "at least 2,000" lives. Amnesty International said at least 100 Falun Gong practitioners had reportedly died in the 2008 calendar year, either in custody or shortly after their release. Investigative journalist Ethan Gutmann estimated 65,000 Falun Gong were killed for their organs from 2000 to 2008 based on extensive interviews, while researchers David Kilgour and David Matas reported, "the source of 41,500 transplants for the six-year period 2000 to 2005 is unexplained".

Chinese authorities do not publish statistics on Falun Gong practitioners killed amidst the crackdown. In individual cases, however, authorities have denied that deaths in custody were due to torture.

=== Forced organ harvesting allegations ===
In 2006, allegations emerged that a large number of Falun Gong practitioners had been killed to supply China's organ transplant industry. These allegations prompted an investigation by former Canadian Secretary of State David Kilgour and human rights lawyer David Matas.

The Kilgour-Matas report was published in July 2006, and concluded that "the government of China and its agencies in numerous parts of the country, in particular hospitals but also detention centers and 'people's courts', since 1999 have put to death a large but unknown number of Falun Gong prisoners of conscience." The report, which was based mainly on circumstantial evidence, called attention to the extremely short wait times for organs in China—one to two weeks for a liver compared with 32.5 months in Canada—implying it was indicative of organs being procured on demand. It also tracked a significant increase in the number of annual organ transplants in China beginning in 1999, corresponding with the onset of the persecution of Falun Gong. Despite very low levels of voluntary organ donation, China performs the second-highest number of transplants per year. Kilgour and Matas also presented self-accusatory material from Chinese transplant center web sites advertising the immediate availability of organs from living donors and transcripts of telephone investigations in which hospitals admittd to having "Falun Gong suppliers" for organs.

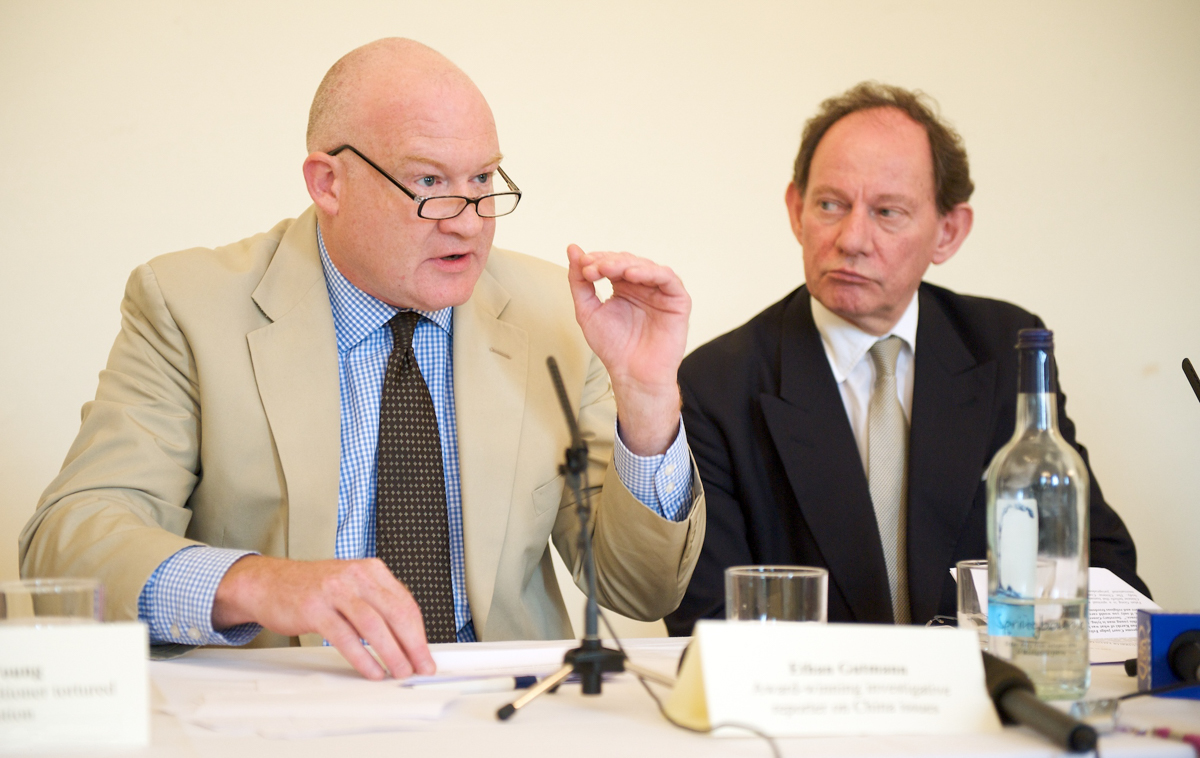
Ethan Gutmann (left) with Edward McMillan-Scott at a Foreign Press Association press conference, 2009

In May 2008 two United Nations Special Rapporteurs reiterated requests for the Chinese authorities to respond to the allegations, and to explain a source for the organs that would account for the sudden increase in organ transplants in China since 2000. Chinese officials have responded by denying the organ harvesting allegations, and insisting that China abides by World Health Organization principles that prohibit the sale of human organs without written consent from donors. Responding to a U.S. House of Representatives Resolution calling for an end to abusing transplant practices against religious and ethnic minorities, a Chinese embassy spokesperson said "the so-called organ harvesting from death-row prisoners is totally a lie fabricated by Falun Gong."

In 2014, investigative journalist Ethan Gutmann published the result of his own investigation. Gutmann conducted extensive interviews with former detainees in Chinese labor camps and prisons, as well as former security officers and medical professionals with knowledge of China's transplant practices. He reported that organ harvesting from political prisoners likely began in Xinjiang province in the 1990s, and then spread nationwide. Gutmann estimates that some 64,000 Falun Gong prisoners may have been killed for their organs between 2000 and 2008.

In a 2016 report, David Kilgour found that he had underestimated. In the new report he found that the government's official estimates for the volume of organs harvested since the persecution of Falun Gong began to be 150,000 to 200,000. Media outlets have extrapolated from this study a death toll of 1.5 million. Ethan Gutmann estimated from this update that 60,000 to 110,000 organs are harvested in China annually, observing that it is (paraphrasing) "difficult but plausible to harvest 3 organs from a single body" and also calls the harvest "a new form of genocide using the most respected members of society".

In June 2019, the China Tribunal— a non-governmental tribunal set up by the International Coalition to End Transplant Abuse in China—concluded that detainees including imprisoned followers of the Falun Gong movement are still being killed for organ harvesting. The Tribunal, chaired by British barrister Geoffrey Nice, said it was "certain that Falun Gong as a source—probably the principal source—of organs for forced organ harvesting".

The allegations and the evidence supporting them have also been subject to skepticism. In 2017, the New Yorker reported that a lawyer who had defended hundreds of Falun Gong practitioners, had said he has "never heard of organs being harvested from live prisoners". In 2018, ABC News quoted Benjamin Penny, a scholar of Falun Gong, as saying "My view on it is that I have not seen evidence which convinces me that is true. But I've not seen any evidence that convinces me that it's not true". Penny added that he believes that the case of organ harvesting was not proven and it may never be proven, and suggested that even if organ harvesting had occurred, it was not an ongoing practice. ABC News also quoted Wendy Roger, a professor in clinical ethics at Macquarie University, who maintained that credible evidence supported the allegations but claimed that the Chinese government's propaganda had been "successful" in denying them, and argued that potential Chinese whistleblowers feared for their lives if they exposed the practice.

In June 2021, the Special Procedures of the United Nations Human Rights Council voiced concerns over having "received credible information that detainees from ethnic, linguistic or religious minorities may be forcibly subjected to blood tests and organ examinations such as ultrasound and x-rays, without their informed consent; while other prisoners are not required to undergo such examinations." The press release stated that UN's human rights experts "were extremely alarmed by reports of alleged 'organ harvesting' targeting minorities, including Falun Gong practitioners, Uyghurs, Tibetans, Muslims and Christians, in detention in China."

=== Media campaign ===
The Chinese government's campaign against Falun Gong has been driven by large-scale propaganda through television, newspapers, radio and internet. The government labels Falun Gong as one of the "Five Poisons" and its propaganda campaign has focused on allegations that Falun Gong jeopardized social stability, was deceiving and dangerous, was anti-science and threatened progress, and argued that Falun Gong's moral philosophy was incompatible with a Marxist social ethic.

China scholars Daniel Wright and Joseph Fewsmith stated that for several months after Falun Gong was outlawed, China Central Television's evening news contained little but anti-Falun Gong rhetoric, and that the government operation was "a study in all-out demonization". Falun Gong was compared to "a rat crossing the street that everyone shouts out to squash" by state-owned Beijing Daily; other officials said it would be a "long-term, complex and serious" struggle to "eradicate" Falun Gong.

State propaganda initially used the appeal of scientific rationalism to argue that Falun Gong's worldview was in "complete opposition to science" and communism. For example, the People's Daily asserted on 27 July 1999, that the fight against Falun Gong "was a struggle between theism and atheism, superstition and science, idealism and materialism". Other editorials declared that Falun Gong's "idealism and theism" are "absolutely contradictory to the fundamental theories and principles of Marxism", and that the "'truth, kindness and forbearance' principle preached by [Falun Gong] has nothing in common with the socialist ethical and cultural progress we are striving to achieve." Suppressing Falun Gong was presented as a necessary step to maintaining the "vanguard role" of the CCP in Chinese society.

Despite CCP efforts, initial charges leveled against Falun Gong failed to elicit widespread popular support for the persecution of the group. In the months following July 1999, the rhetoric in the state-run press escalated to include charges that Falun Gong was colluding with foreign, "anti-China" forces. In October 1999, three months after the persecution began, the People's Daily newspaper claimed Falun Gong as a xiejiao (邪教). A direct translation of that term is "heretical teaching", but during the anti-Falun Gong propaganda campaign was rendered as "evil cult" in English. According to a Washington Post report, it was Jiang Zemin who issued the order to label Falun Gong a "cult". In mainland China, the term xiejiao has been used to target religious organizations that do not submit to CCP authority. In late 2000, the government established the China Anti-Cult Association to oppose Falun Gong and certain other new religious movements.

Ian Johnson argued that applying the 'cult' label to Falun Gong effectively "cloaked the government's crackdown with the legitimacy of the West's anticult movement". He wrote that Falun Gong does not satisfy common definitions of a cult: "its members marry outside the group, have outside friends, hold normal jobs, do not live isolated from society, do not believe that the world's end is imminent and do not give significant amounts of money to the organisation ... it does not advocate violence and is at heart an apolitical, inward-oriented discipline, one aimed at cleansing oneself spiritually and improving one's health." David Ownby similarly wrote that "the entire issue of the supposed cultic nature of Falun Gong was a red herring from the beginning, cleverly exploited by the Chinese state to blunt the appeal of Falun Gong". According to John Powers and Meg Y. M. Lee, because the Falun Gong was categorized in the popular perception as an "apolitical, qigong exercise club", it was not seen as a threat to the government. The most critical strategy in the Falun Gong suppression campaign, therefore, was to convince people to reclassify the Falun Gong into a number of "negatively charged religious labels", like "evil cult", "sect", or "superstition". The group's silent protests were reclassified as creating "social disturbances". In this process of relabelling, the government was attempting to tap into a "deep reservoir of negative feelings related to the historical role of quasi-religious cults as a destabilising force in Chinese political history".

A turning point in the propaganda campaign came on the eve of Chinese New Year on 23 January 2001, when five people attempted to set themselves ablaze on Tiananmen Square. The official Chinese press agency, Xinhua News Agency, and other state media asserted that the self-immolators were practitioners, though the Falun Dafa Information Center disputed this, on the grounds that the movement's teachings explicitly forbid suicide and killing, further alleging that the event was "a cruel (but clever) piece of stunt-work". The incident received international news coverage, and video footage of the burnings were broadcast later inside China by China Central Television (CCTV). The broadcasts showed images of a 12-year-old girl, Liu Siying, burning, and interviews with the other participants in which they stated a belief that self-immolation would lead them to paradise. But one of the CNN producers on the scene did not even see a child there. Falun Gong sources and other commentators pointed out that the main participants' account of the incident and other aspects of the participants' behavior were inconsistent with Falun Gong's teachings. Media Channel and the International Education Development (IED) agree that the supposed self-immolation incident was staged by CCP to "prove" that Falun Gong brainwashes its followers to commit suicide and has therefore to be banned as a threat to the nation. IED's statement at the 53rd UN session describes China's violent assault on Falun Gong practitioners as state terrorism and that the self-immolation "was staged by the government". Washington Post journalist Phillip Pan wrote that the two self-immolators who died were not actually Falun Gong practitioners. On 21 March 2001, Liu Siying suddenly died after appearing very lively and being deemed ready to leave the hospital to go home. Time reported that prior to the self-immolation incident, many Chinese had felt that Falun Gong posed no real threat, and that the state's crackdown had gone too far. After the event, however, the mainland Chinese media campaign against Falun Gong gained significant traction. As public sympathy for Falun Gong declined, the government began sanctioning "systematic use of violence" against the group.

In February 2001, the month following the Tiananmen Square self-immolation incident, Jiang Zemin convened a rare Central Work Conference to stress the importance of continuity in the anti-Falun Gong campaign and unite senior party officials behind the effort. Under Jiang's leadership, the crackdown on Falun Gong became part of the Chinese political ethos of "upholding stability"—much the same rhetoric employed by the CCP during 1989 Tiananmen Square protests and massacre. Jiang's message was echoed at the 2001 National People's Congress, where the Falun Gong's eradication was tied to China's economic progress. Though less prominent on the national agenda, the persecution of Falun Gong has carried on after Jiang was retired; successive, high-level "strike hard" campaigns against Falun Gong were initiated in both 2008 and 2009. In 2010, a three-year campaign was launched to renew attempts at the coercive "transformation" of Falun Gong practitioners.

==== In the education system ====
Anti-Falun Gong propaganda efforts have also permeated the Chinese education system. Following Jiang's 1999 ban of Falun Gong, then-Minister of Education Chen Zhili launched an active campaign to promote the CCP's line on Falun Gong within all levels of academic institutions, including graduate schools, universities and colleges, middle schools, primary schools, and kindergartens. Her efforts included a "Cultural Revolution-like pledge" in Chinese schools that required faculty members, staff, and students to publicly denounce Falun Gong. Teachers who did not comply with Chen's program were dismissed or detained; uncooperative students were refused academic advancement, expelled from school, or sent to "transformation" camps to alter their thinking. Chen also worked to spread the anti-Falun Gong academic propaganda movement overseas, using domestic educational funding to donate aid to foreign institutions, encouraging them to oppose Falun Gong.

=== Falun Gong's response to the persecution ===
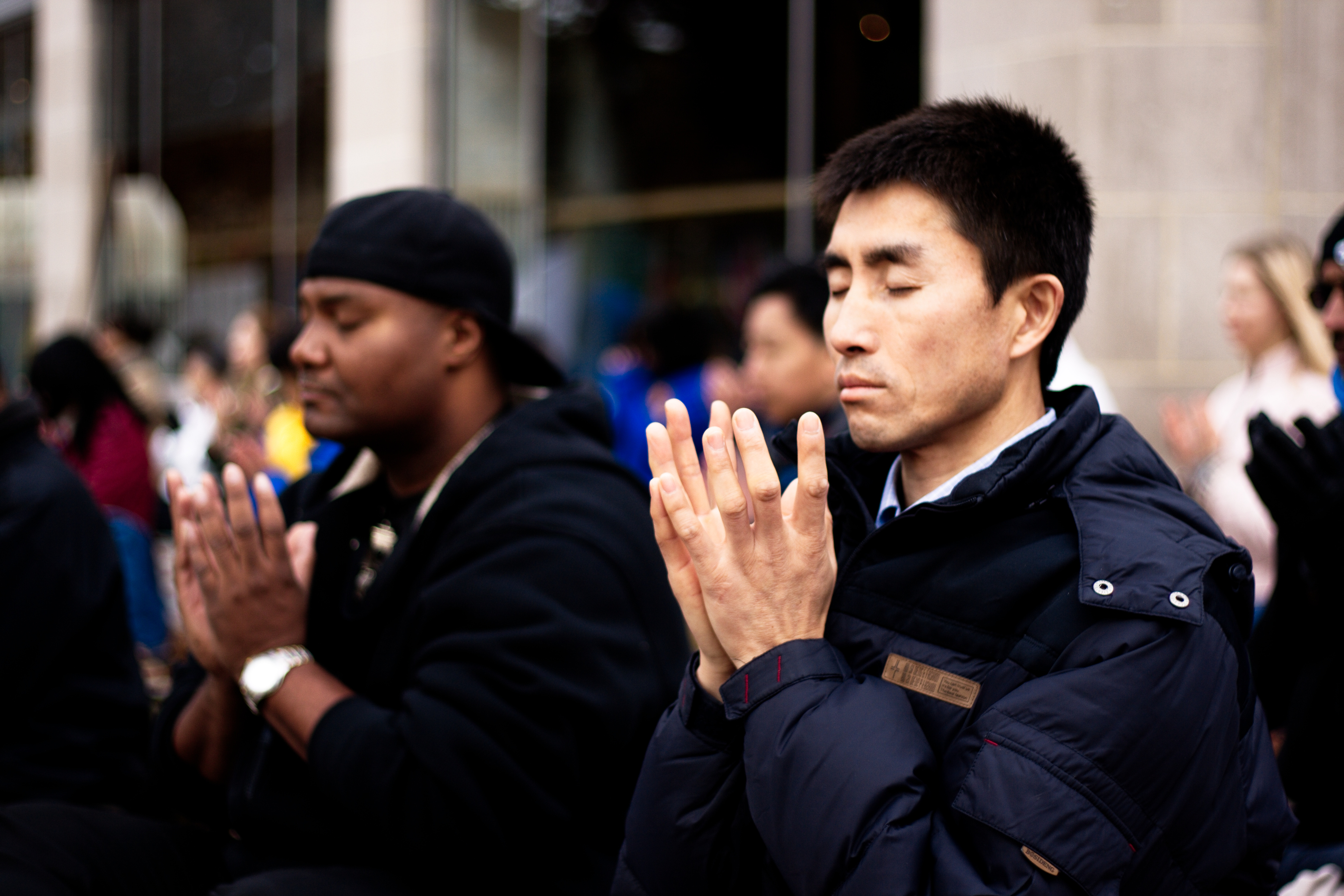
Practitioners meditate to protest the persecution of Falun Gong at a demonstration in Washington, D.C.

Falun Gong's response to the persecution in China began in July 1999 with appeals to local, provincial, and central petitioning offices in Beijing. It soon progressed to larger demonstrations, with hundreds of Falun Gong practitioners traveling daily to Tiananmen Square to perform Falun Gong exercises or raise banners in defense of the practice. These demonstrations were invariably broken up by security forces, and the practitioners involved were arrested—sometimes violently—and detained. By 25 April 2000, a total of more than 30,000 practitioners had been arrested on the square; seven hundred Falun Gong followers were arrested during a demonstration in the square on 1 January 2001. Public protests continued well into 2001. Writing for the Wall Street Journal, Ian Johnson wrote that "Falun Gong faithful have mustered what is arguably the most sustained challenge to authority in 50 years of Communist rule." Jiang Zemin reportedly described Falun Gong as the biggest political issue in China since the 1989 Tiananmen Square protests and massacre.

Falun Gong asserted that its struggle with the CCP amounted to a struggle of good versus evil. Falun Gong called on Chinese to denounce affiliations with the CCP, the Communist Youth League, and the Young Pioneers. Falun Gong instructed its adherents in China to "tell the truth" (jiang zhenxiangh), which would advance their progress towards Consummation and fulfill their roles in saving humankind. The primary means of "telling the truth" included circulating pamphlets and video to publicize the persecution and suppression of Falun Gong by the state.

By late 2001, demonstrations in Tiananmen Square had become less frequent, and the practice was driven deeper underground. As public protest fell out of favor, practitioners established underground "material sites", which would produce literature and DVDs to counter the portrayal of Falun Gong in the official media. Practitioners then distribute these materials, often door-to-door. Falun Gong sources estimated in 2009 that over 200,000 such sites exist across China today. The production, possession, or distribution of these materials is frequently grounds for security agents to incarcerate or sentence Falun Gong practitioners.

In 2002, Falun Gong activists in China tapped into television broadcasts, replacing regular state-run programming with their own content. One of the more notable instances occurred in March 2002, when Falun Gong practitioners in Changchun intercepted eight cable television networks in Jilin Province, and for nearly an hour, televised a program titled "Self-Immolation or a Staged Act?". All six of the Falun Gong practitioners involved were captured over the next few months. Two were killed immediately, while the other four were all dead by 2010 as a result of injuries sustained while imprisoned.

Outside China, Falun Gong practitioners established international media organizations to gain wider exposure for their cause and challenge narratives of the Chinese state-run media. These include The Epoch Times newspaper, New Tang Dynasty Television, and Sound of Hope radio station. According to Zhao, through The Epoch Times it can be discerned how Falun Gong is building a "de facto media alliance" with China's democracy movements in exile, as demonstrated by its frequent printing of articles by prominent overseas Chinese critics of the PRC government. In 2004, The Epoch Times published a collection of nine editorials that presented a critical history of the Chinese Communist Party. This catalyzed the Tuidang movement, which encourages Chinese citizens to renounce their affiliations to the Chinese Communist Party, including ex post facto renunciations of the Communist Youth League and Young Pioneers. The Epoch Times claims that tens of millions have renounced the Chinese Communist Party as part of the movement, though these numbers have not been independently verified.

In 2006, Falun Gong practitioners in the United States formed Shen Yun Performing Arts, a dance and music company that tours internationally. During Shen Yun's 2024 season, the company's eight touring troupes performed over 800 shows on five continents. By 2024, Shen Yun accumulated $266 million in assets mainly through ticket sales and by keeping its costs down through numerous volunteer hours and sometimes personal savings of Falun Gong adherents.

Falun Gong software developers in the United States are also responsible for the creation of several popular censorship-circumvention tools employed by internet users in China.

Falun Gong practitioners outside China have filed dozens of lawsuits against Jiang Zemin, Luo Gan, Bo Xilai, and other Chinese officials alleging genocide and crimes against humanity. According to International Advocates for Justice, Falun Gong has filed the largest number of human rights lawsuits in the 21st century and the charges are among the most severe international crimes defined by international criminal laws. As of 2006, 54 civil and criminal lawsuits were under way in 33 countries. In many instances, courts have refused to adjudicate the cases on the grounds of sovereign immunity. In late 2009, however, separate courts in Spain and Argentina indicted Jiang and Luo on charges of "crimes of humanity" and genocide, and asked for their arrest—the ruling is acknowledged to be largely symbolic and unlikely to be carried out. The court in Spain also indicted Bo Xilai, Jia Qinglin and Wu Guanzheng.

Falun Gong practitioners and their supporters also filed a lawsuit in May 2011 against the technology company Cisco Systems, alleging that the company helped design and implement a surveillance system for the Chinese government to suppress Falun Gong. Cisco denied customizing their technology for this purpose. The United States District Court for the Northern District of California dismissed the lawsuit in September 2014. In July 2023, the United States Court of Appeals for the Ninth Circuit reversed and ruled the lawsuit may proceed to trial. In June 2026, the Supreme Court of the United States dismissed the lawsuit.

Sociologist Andrew Junker described Falun Gong's nonviolent resistance to the persecution as the "most well-organized and tenacious grassroots Chinese protest movement ever to challenge the CCP". He argued that Falun Gong's more effective and enduring mobilization, compared to the pro-democracy movement (minyun), is due in part to its decentralized organizational structure and emphasis on individual initiative.

== Outside China ==
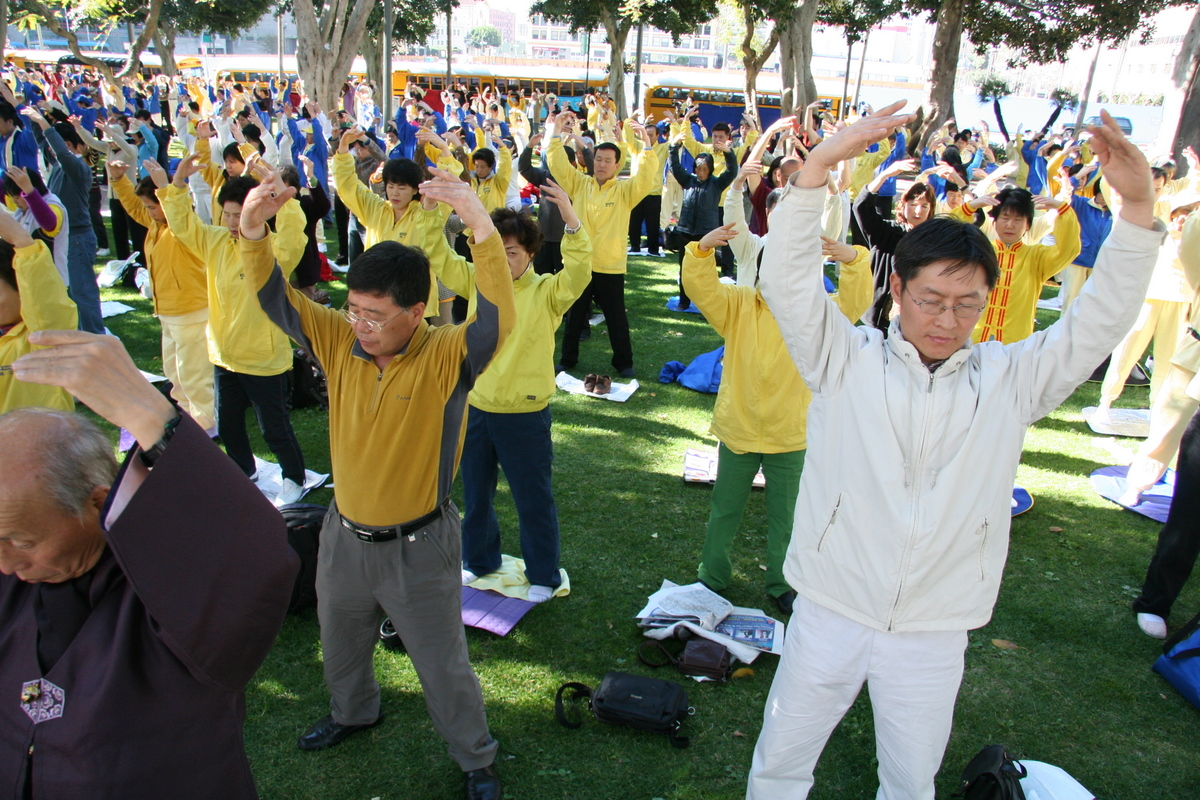
Falun Gong practitioners outside China hold events such as this group exercise in Los Angeles.

Li Hongzhi began teaching Falun Gong internationally in March 1995. His first stop was in Paris where, at the invitation of the Chinese ambassador, he held a lecture seminar at the PRC embassy. This was followed by lectures in Sweden in May 1995. Between 1995 and 1999, Li gave lectures in the United States, Canada, Australia, New Zealand, Germany, Switzerland, and Singapore.

Falun Gong's growth outside China largely corresponded to the migration of students from mainland China to the West in the early-to-mid-1990s. Falun Gong associations and clubs began appearing in Europe, North America and Australia, with activities centered mainly on university campuses.

Translations of Falun Gong teachings began appearing in the late 1990s. As the practice began proliferating outside China, Li was beginning to receive recognition in the United States and elsewhere in the western world. In May 1999, Li was welcomed to Toronto with greetings from the city's mayor and the provincial lieutenant governor, and in the two months that followed also received recognition from the cities of Chicago and San Jose.

Although the practice was beginning to attract an overseas constituency in the 1990s, it remained relatively unknown outside China until the Spring of 1999, when tensions between Falun Gong and the CCP became a subject of international media coverage. With the increased attention, the practice gained a greater following outside China. Following the launch of the CCP's suppression campaign against Falun Gong, the overseas presence became vital to the practice's resistance in China and its continued survival. Falun Gong practitioners overseas have responded to the persecution in China through regular demonstrations, parades, and through the creation of media outlets, performing arts companies, and censorship-circumvention software mainly intended to reach mainland Chinese audiences.

In its study of transnational repression committed by governments, Freedom House has reported that practitioners of Falun Gong have been targeted by the Chinese government's transnational repression campaign. According to The Diplomat, Xi Jinping reportedly directed CCP officials in 2022 to intensify efforts to "completely, and on an international scale, suppress Falun Gong's momentum" by shaping global public opinion and using legal warfare against Falun Gong organizations abroad, including in the United States.

In 2023, two unregistered PRC agents, were indicted for bribing an IRS official to manipulate the IRS whistleblower program against Shen Yun Performing Arts in order to strip its tax-exempt status. Both were sentenced in 2024.

== International reception ==
Since 1999, numerous Western governments and human rights organizations have expressed condemnation of the Chinese government's suppression of Falun Gong. Since 1999, members of the United States Congress have made public pronouncements and introduced several resolutions in support of Falun Gong. In 2010, U.S. House of Representatives Resolution 605 called for "an immediate end to the campaign to persecute, intimidate, imprison, and torture Falun Gong practitioners", condemned the Chinese authorities' efforts to distribute "false propaganda" about the practice worldwide, and expressed sympathy to persecuted Falun Gong practitioners and their families.

Adam Frank writes that in reporting on the Falun Gong, the Western tradition of casting the Chinese as "exotic" took dominance, and that while the facts were generally correct in Western media coverage, "the normalcy that millions of Chinese practitioners associated with the practice had all but disappeared." David Ownby wrote that alongside these tactics, the "cult" label applied to Falun Gong by the Chinese authorities never entirely went away in the minds of some Westerners, and the stigma still plays a role in wary public perceptions of Falun Gong.

To counter the support of Falun Gong in the West, the Chinese government expanded their efforts against the group internationally. This included visits to newspaper officers by diplomats to "extol the virtues of Communist China and the evils of Falun Gong", linking support for Falun Gong with "jeopardizing trade relations", and sending letters to local politicians telling them to withdraw support for the practice. According to Perry Link, pressure on Western institutions also takes more subtle forms, including academic self-censorship, whereby research on Falun Gong could result in a denial of visa for fieldwork in China; or exclusion and discrimination from business and community groups who have connections with China and fear angering Chinese government.

Although the persecution of Falun Gong has drawn condemnation outside China, some observers assert that Falun Gong has failed to attract the level of sympathy and sustained attention afforded to other Chinese dissident groups.

Ethan Gutmann, a journalist reporting on China since the early 1990s, has attempted to explain this apparent dearth of public sympathy for Falun Gong as stemming, in part, from the group's shortcomings in public relations. Unlike the democracy activists or Tibetans, who have found a comfortable place in Western perceptions, "Falun Gong marched to a distinctly Chinese drum", Gutmann writes. Moreover, practitioners' attempts at getting their message across carried some of the uncouthness of Communist Party culture, including a perception that practitioners tended to exaggerate, create "torture tableaux straight out of a Cultural Revolution opera", or "spout slogans rather than facts". Gutmann also says that media organizations and human rights groups also self-censor on the topic, given the PRC governments vehement attitude toward the practice, and the potential repercussions that may follow for making overt representations on Falun Gong's behalf.

Richard Madsen writes that Falun Gong lacks robust backing from the American constituencies that usually support religious freedom. For instance, Falun Gong's conservative moral beliefs have alienated some liberal constituencies in the West (e.g. its teachings against promiscuity and homosexual behavior). He also states that Christian conservatives do not support Falun Gong while they do support Chinese Christians. Madsen charges that the American political center does not want to push the human rights issue so hard that it would disrupt commercial and political relations with China. Thus, Falun Gong practitioners have largely had to rely on their own resources in responding to suppression.

In August 2007, the newly reestablished Rabbinic Sanhedrin deliberated persecution of the movement by the Chinese government at the request of Falun Gong.

Sociologist Andrew Junker stated that "secularist biases" and the risk of "severe professional sanction" by the Chinese government are two primary factors that distort Western scholars' understanding of Falun Gong. He wrote: "The combined result of these two factors is a kind of blindness. As we try to stand outside the historical episode of Falun Gong and peer in, it is as if one of our eyes has been poked out by the Chinese state, whereas we cover the other eye with our own hand."

In 2017, scholar James R. Lewis noted that some Falun Gong supporters distanced themselves from the movement after critics drew attention to Li Hongzhi's opposition to homosexuality, feminism, rock music, shape-shifting space aliens, and "race mixing". Lewis argued that Falun Gong's public presentation was "janus-faced" where it portrays itself as an "innocuous spiritual exercise movement", while dismissing or downplaying Li's controversial statements about people and lifestyle choices he opposed.

According to a veteran China watcher, Orville Schell, the West's "blind" acceptance of Falun Gong reflected a common tendency to see China in black and white while overlooking complexities and nuances. Schell, then Dean of the Journalism School at the University of California, Berkeley, said that "anyone the Chinese government opposes gets lionized as righteous." Lewis noted that San Francisco legislators withdrew their Nobel Prize nomination for Li after learning about his views on race and sexuality. Lewis also discussed criticism that Falun Gong had obscured or downplayed controversial aspects of Li's talks and writings as a strategy to help maintain Western support. Political scientist Ming Xia stated critics accused Falun Gong of deliberately obscuring its teachings in the West to influence domestic and foreign policy, adding that "they know how to play politics with American elected officials."

== See also ==
- Freedom of religion in China
- Human rights in China
- List of new religious movements

== Bibliography ==
- Ownby, David (2008). Falun Gong and the Future of China. Oxford University Press. ISBN 978-0-19-532905-6.
- Schechter, Danny (2001). Falun Gong's Challenge to China: Spiritual Practice or "Evil Cult"?: a Report and Reader. Akashic Books. ISBN 1-888451-13-0. Archived from the original on 5 April 2023.
- Palmer, David A. (2007). Qigong fever: body, science, and utopia in China. New York: Columbia University Press. ISBN 978-0-231-14066-9. Archived from the original on 14 May 2024 – via Google Books.
- Tong, James (2009). Revenge of the Forbidden City: The suppression of the Falungong in China, 1999–2005. Oxford University Press. ISBN 978-0-19-537728-6.
