= Craig S. Smith =

American journalist (born 1955)

Craig S. Smith (born October 13, 1955, in Spokane, Washington) is an American journalist and former executive of The New York Times. Until January, 2000, he wrote for The Wall Street Journal, most notably covering the rise of the religious movement Falun Gong in China. He joined The New York Times as Shanghai bureau chief in 2000 and wrote extensively about the practice of harvesting organs from executed prisoners in China. In 2002 he moved to Paris. He has reported for the Times in more than forty countries, from Iraq to Israel to Kyrgyzstan. He has covered several conflicts, including the 2001 invasion of Afghanistan, the 2003 war in Iraq and the 2006 Israeli-Lebanese war. He also covered the 2005 unrest in the French banlieues. In 2008, he joined Hong Kong billionaire Richard Li Tzar Kai's financial news venture as executive editor and subsequently became senior vice president of Li's Pacific Century Group. He rejoined The New York Times in late 2011 as China managing director, founding and running the New York Times' first foreign language site, cn.nytimes.com. In late 2016 he returned to the U.S. as a writer at large for the Times, focused on Canadian stories. He retired from the Times in 2018 and now writes for the Times and other publications about artificial intelligence. He served as a special Government employee for the National Security Commission on Artificial Intelligence and is host of the podcast Eye on AI, which is rated number 2 among AI-related podcasts by Feedspot.

== Personal life ==
Smith received his undergraduate degree from Columbia University in 1979 with a joint major in English literature and a master's in Western philosophy. He also earned a master's degree from the Columbia University Graduate School of Journalism in 1987. His father was an assistant general counsel of IBM.

He is married to Anna Esaki, daughter of Nobel laureate Dr. Leo Esaki, and they have two sons, Sky, an actor, and True, a music executive.
