= Revenge of the Forbidden City =

Book by James W. Tong

- Cover
- Author: James W. Tong
- Language: English
- Subject: Falun Gong
- Publisher: Oxford University Press
- Publication date: 2009
- Pages: 282
- ISBN: 978-0-19-537728-6
- OCLC: 301888695
- Dewey Decimal: 323.44'20951090511
- LC Class: BP605.F36 T66 2009

Revenge of the Forbidden City: The Suppression of the Falungong in China, 1999-2005 is a 2009 book by James W. Tong, published by Oxford University Press. It describes how the Chinese government suppressed the Falun Gong in that stated time frame. David Ownby of the Université de Montréal described it as "a very nuts-and-bolts book".

The book shows how the Chinese central government directed the actions. Ownby stated that the book also concludes that the Chinese state retained its power after the reform and opening up occurred.

It is intended for readers studying the politics of China in academia.

== Background ==
Tong analysed yearbooks from Chinese municipalities and provinces, Chinese newspaper articles, and media from the Falun Gong. According to Ownby, the sources from the "official" publications make up the majority of the sourcing. Gerda Wielander, in The China Quarterly, stated "It is almost impossible to convey the sheer wealth of sources and documents that were analysed for this book."

== Content ==
There are nine chapters. The beginning of the book shows Jiang Zemin's negative reception of the mass gathering of the Falun Gong in 1999. There is an introduction which describes the formation of the Falun Gong movement. Each subsequent chapter highlights a particular aspect of the suppression, with data being shown from the second to the seventh chapter. The Chinese government preparing its suppression programme, doing so in secret, is covered in the second chapter. Another chapter is about the media campaign against the Falun Gong, another is on "conversion programs" to take believers away from the religion, and another is about how the Chinese government directed the campaign.

The last chapter, number 8, evaluates the entirety of the anti-Falun Gong campaign including the suppression and post-suppression campaigns against the Falun Gong movement on whether they succeeded in reducing influence of the Falun Gong.

== Reception ==
Ownby stated the book is "convincing, if somewhat narrowly focused".

Cheris Shun-ching Chan (Note: Cheris Shun-ching Chan: traditional Chinese: 陳純菁; simplified Chinese: 陈纯菁; Jyutping: can4 seon4 zing1; pinyin: Chén Chúnjīng) of the University of Hong Kong wrote that "much needed insights " and that it "captures the processes through which the Chinese authorities executed its anti-Falungong campaign." She argued using Chinese government documents as main sources was "A limitation of the book".

James T. Richardson of the University of Nevada, Reno stated the book "is well worth the cost".
