= Dragon Springs =

Falun Gong headquarters in Deerpark, New York, US

Coordinates: 41.447°N 74.590°W

Dragon Springs, also known as the Mountain, is a 427-acre (1.73 km^{2}) compound in Deerpark, New York, US that is the headquarters of the global Falun Gong new religious movement and the Shen Yun performance arts troupe. Falun Gong founder and leader Li Hongzhi (Note: In this article, the surname is Li.) lives near the compound, as do hundreds of Falun Gong adherents. Members of Shen Yun live and rehearse in the compound, which also has an orphanage, schools, and temples.

== Location ==
Dragon Springs is primarily in Deerpark, New York, near the hamlet of Cuddebackville, north of Port Jervis, in Orange County. It sits below the Shawangunk Mountains approximately two hours north of Manhattan. The surrounding communities have many Falun Gong followers. Near Dragon Springs, in Middletown, was an office for the Falun Gong media extension The Epoch Times, which published a special local edition.

== Overview ==
The compound has been a point of controversy among former residents who have stated Li Hongzhi maintains tight control over daily life.

=== Fei Tian College and Fei Tian Academy of the Arts ===
Two schools operate in or around Falun Gong's Dragon Springs compound: Fei Tian College (traditional Chinese: 飛天大學; simplified Chinese: 飞天大学; pinyin: Fēitiān Dàxué), a private arts college; and a middle-high school, the Fei Tian Academy of Arts (traditional Chinese: 飛天藝術學校; simplified Chinese: 飛天艺术学校; pinyin: Fēitiān Yìshù Xuéxiào). Fei Tian College "acts as a feeder for Shen Yun". Both the college and high school initially operated out of Dragon Springs before expanding into Middletown in 2017. According to the Times Herald-Record, "the two schools are independent entities but maintain a close relationship".

The college offers a Bachelor of Fine Arts in "classical Chinese dance and Bachelor's in Music Performance", student facilities include an on-site basketball court and a gym, and 2015 enrollment consisted of 127 students. Fei Tian College holds institutional accreditation from the New York State Board of Regents. Academic Yutian Wong referred to the college as "[Shen Yun]'s own degree-granting institution".

The high school was first approved by the New York State Education Department for operation in 2007. As of 2012, it operated with 200 students. In 2012, the school became a point of contention with Deerpark officials after discovering its operations because "they were never told of a performing arts college and high school being run there". This led the Deerpark Planning Board to unanimously deny a six-month extension for a special-use permit for Dragon Springs.

== Architecture ==
According to its owners, Dragon Springs is centered on a 75-foot-tall (23-meter-tall) Buddhist temple built in the style of the Tang dynasty. Several additional buildings in the compound were constructed in the same wood-heavy, Tang-dynasty style. Other buildings have been erected in a modern style.

During construction in 2008, a 54-year-old man from Toronto, Janin Liu, died in a fall. As he was a volunteer construction worker, not an employee, the Occupational Safety and Health Administration (OSHA) did not investigate the fatal accident. No autopsy was made, because of the religious preferences of the dead man's family.

== Conflict with surrounding communities ==
Dragon Springs is a point of contention within Deerpark and the surrounding communities. Falun Gong adherents living in the area have claimed that they have experienced discrimination from local residents and from the local government based on their race and religious beliefs.

In 2014 the town of Deerpark took Dragon Springs Buddhist Inc. to court over persistent illegal construction in the Dragon Springs compound. The organization has a history of breaking local laws and then paying the associated fines without complaint.

In 2018 Dragon Springs Buddhist Inc. was fined $7,500 since it failed to comply with a local construction law requiring the installation of a sprinkler system for wooden buildings over four stories tall. It was also issued with a stop-work order for the illegal eighth floor of the permitted seven floor wood building.

In 2019, Falun Gong filed for permits to expand the site, wishing to add a 920-seat concert hall, a new parking garage, a wastewater treatment plant, and a conversion of meditation space into residential space large enough to bring the total residential capacity to 500 people. These plans met with opposition from the Delaware Riverkeeper Network and other environmental non-profits and citizens’ groups regarding the wastewater treatment facility and the elimination of local wetlands, impacting local waterways such as the Basher Kill and Neversink River. Local residents opposed the expansion because it would increase traffic and reduce the rural character of the area in addition to the negative environmental effects. The public hearing meeting lasted over three hours, with a substantial number of speakers expressing their views on the proposed action.

After visiting in 2019, scholar Andrew Junker noted that "the secrecy of Dragon Springs was obvious and a source of tension for the town." Junker added that Dragon Springs's website says its restricted access is for security reasons and that the site claims the compound contains orphans and refugees.

In January 2022, residents and the non-profit NYenvironcom sued, alleging that Dragon Springs violated the Clean Water Act. The court dismissed the "broad" allegations without prejudice in January 2023. In September 2024, the court dismissed with prejudice the second lawsuit filed by the same plaintiffs in June 2023. The plaintiffs appealed in September 2024 . On September 16 2025 a 3 Judge panel from the US Court of Appeals for the Second Circuit ruled that the plaintiffs provided the defendants sufficient notice, reversing the lower court's dismissal of the case, finding that the pre-suit notice met the law's standards for identifying alleged activities, pollutants discharged, and the location of the pollution.

- Chinese people in New York City
