= Vivienne Shue =

American sinologist

Vivienne Shue, FBA (Chinese: 许慧文; pinyin: Xǔ Huìwén) is Emeritus Leverhulme Professor of Contemporary China Studies at Oxford University. She specializes in Chinese politics and society, local governance and patterns of state-society interaction. Shue received her B.A. from Vassar College, her B.Litt. from Oxford after she was awarded the Marshall Scholarship and her Ph.D. from Harvard University. She was elected to the British Academy in 2008.

== The Reach of the State ==
Shue is best known for her book The Reach of the State: Sketches of the Chinese Body Politic, which was published by Stanford University Press in 1988. The book "changed the field" by arguing that the Chinese government could only be understood in the context of its history, the relations between the centre and the periphery and the continuing role of elites.

== Books ==
- To Govern China, eds. Patricia M. Thornton and Vivienne Shue (Cambridge University Press, 2017).
- Paying for Progress in China: Public Finance, Human Welfare and Changing Patterns of Inequality. With Christine Wong, eds. London and New York: Routledge, 2007.
- Tethered Deer: Government and Economy in a Chinese County. With Marc Blecher. Stanford: Stanford University Press, 1996.
- State Power and Social Forces: Domination and Transformation in the Third World. With Joel S. Migdal and Atul Kohli, eds. New York: Cambridge University Press, 1994.
- The Reach of the State: Sketches of the Chinese Body Politic. Stanford: Stanford University Press, 1988.
- Peasant China in Transition: The Dynamics of Development toward Socialism, 1949-1956. Berkeley: University of California Press, 1980.
