= Forschungsjournal Soziale Bewegungen =

German academic journal on social science

- Discipline: Social movements, Civil society, Political sociology
- Language: German
- Edited by: Ansgar Klein, Hans-Josef Legrand, Jan Rohwerder, Jochen Roose

Publication details
- Former name(s): Forschungsjournal Neue Soziale Bewegungen
- History: 1988–present
- Publisher: De Gruyter Oldenbourg (Germany)
- Frequency: Quarterly

Standard abbreviations
- ISO 4: Forschungsjournal Soz. Beweg.

Indexing
- ISSN: 2192-4848 (print); 2365-9890 (web)

Links
- Journal homepage; Online access; Online archive

Forschungsjournal Soziale Bewegungen is a German quarterly academic journal devoted to issues of democratization, social movements and political sociology. The current editors are Ansgar Klein, Hans-Josef Legrand, Jan Rohwerder and Jochen Roose. Published by Walter de Gruyter since 2016, the journal was founded in 1988 under the title Forschungsjournal Neue Soziale Bewegungen and renamed in 2011.
