= Teachings of Falun Gong =

Li Hongzhi published the Teachings of Falun Gong' in Changchun, China, in 1992, as well as Zhuan Falun in 1995. His teachings cover a wide range of subjects, from spirituality and ethics to science and metaphysics.

A central theme of Falun Gong teachings is cultivation and salvation through assimilation to what Li describes as the fundamental characteristics of the universe: zhēn 眞, shàn 善 and rěn 忍 (which translate approximately as truthfulness, benevolence, and forbearance). Assimilation to the supreme nature of the universe, Zhen-Shan-Ren, is the foundation of cultivation practice. In this concept, "cultivation" refers to upgrading one's xīnxìng 心性 (mind-nature) by abandoning negative attachments and assimilating oneself to "Truthfulness-Compassion-Forbearance". "Practice" refers to the five meditative exercises that are said to energize the body. Cultivation is considered essential, and the exercises are said to supplement the process of improving oneself.

Li also teaches a cosmology involving a process called Fa-rectification, which he says he has undertaken for years to restructure the laws governing the dimensions inhabited by humans. According to Li's doctrine, only the righteous and practitioners of Falun Dafa can pass to the next dimension and be "saved", while the "old world" and immoral humans will either be eradicated or fall into "much lower levels of existence".

The movement's teachings are primarily presented in the books Falun Gong and Zhuan Falun. Falun Gong serves as an introductory book that discusses qigong, introduces the principles above, and provides illustrations and explanations of exercises for meditation. Zhuan Falun is considered the central and most comprehensive exposition of the teachings of Falun Gong.

After leaving China for the United States, Li told his followers that Zhuan Falun would be the central focus of Falun Gong practice. According to David Ownby, Zhuan Falun was distinctive that it gave emphasis to demonic and apocalyptic themes that other qigong texts had "only hinted at". David Palmer likewise noted that in the 1995 version of Zhuan Falun, it had differed from other qigong literature in that it focused on a millenarian structure where it stressed xing xing (moral development) and changren (salvation from a "demonic world" of "ordinary people"). The book contains references to the "end of the Dharma", demonic possessions, and modern science as an extraterrestrial plot.

Li taught that both "religions and traditions of the past" as well as modern science should be avoided, directing adherents instead to devote themselves to Falun Gong teachings. He advised practitioners to make reading Zhuan Falun a daily activity. Practitioners are also advised to avoid or oppose certain lifestyles, beliefs, and concepts, including communism, extraterrestrial influence, conventional medicine, feminism, rock 'n' roll, modern science, homosexuality, and race-mixing, which are presented as being incompatible with the laws of the universe. Falun Gong's conservative and moralistic views on subjects such as sexuality have attracted controversy.

According to Helen S. Farley and James R. Lewis, Li discouraged practitioners from discussing his more esoteric or higher-level teachings with "outsiders", whom Li referred to as "ordinary people".

== Influences ==
See also Theoretical background and History of Falun Gong

=== Buddhism and Daoism ===
According to Yanfei Sun, a sociologist at China's state-run Zhejiang University, Li's teachings are syncretic, borrowing from existing traditions including Buddhism and Daoism. In particular, Falun Gong borrows heavily from Buddhist cosmology and soteriology but applies Li's idiosyncratic interpretation. Li asserts that the teachings of Buddhism and Daoism are confined to the Milky Way Galaxy, whereas Falun Gong's teachings are of the highest, universe-wide order.

The teachings of Falun Gong make a distinction between fojia, Buddha School, and fojiao, the religion of Buddhism and also the Dao School (daojia) and the religion of Daoism (daojiao). Li Hongzhi states that there are two main systems of Xiu Lian or Cultivation practice: the "Buddha School" and the "Dao School". According to Li, the cultivation ways of the Buddha School focus on the cultivation of Compassion while the Dao School emphasizes the cultivation of Truthfulness. In Falun Gong, Truthfulness and Compassion are apparently understood to be aspects of the cosmos's fundamental nature, Zhen-Shan-Ren. Thus, cultivation practices, whether in the Buddha School or Dao School, are considered a process of assimilation to this cosmic characteristic. Li states that there are many cultivation ways in the Dao and Buddha schools that are unrelated to secular religions, are often handed down from Master to disciple in secret, or "[have] always been practiced quietly, either among the populace or deep in the mountains." Li states that, "These kinds of practices have their uniqueness. They need to choose a good disciple—someone with tremendous virtue who is truly capable of cultivating to an advanced level."

In his book Falun Gong, Li states that Falun Gong is Buddhist qigong that has nothing to do with the religion of Buddhism. Li states that the religion of Buddhism "is a system of cultivation that Shakyamuni awakened to in India more than two thousand years ago when he was cultivating."

In Falun Gong, as in Buddhism or Daoism, practitioners are required to gradually let go of negative attachments. According to David Ownby, the requirement in Falun Gong to abandon human attachments is not for achieving selfish ends but "quite the contrary. Practitioners are enjoined to treat others with compassion and benevolence in order to cultivate virtue and work off karma." He says that such compassion and benevolence should not be reserved to those with whom one had a prior attachment, nor should the goal be to inspire gratitude or love, but for conformity to the nature of the universe. Li also insists that practitioners do not withdraw from the world and that they maintain interactions with non-practitioners, including "even those who are hostile to practice". The point here, according to Ownby, is that before the practitioner cultivates to such a point that they are dispassionate in their compassion, the stress experienced in the secular environment "constitutes a form of suffering which will enable them to reduce their karma".

Academic Stephen Chan suggests that in providing a metaphysical system that relates the life of man with the greater cosmos, Falun Gong presents a philosophy which in a sense bypasses the communist-atheist ideology of Chinese state. He suggests that this may have led to the decision of a ban made by the Chinese authorities. Chan writes that Falun Gong poses no political threat to the Chinese government, and there is no deliberate political agenda within the Falun doctrine. He concludes that Falun Gong is banned not because of the doctrines but simply because Falun Gong is outside of the communist apparatus.

Chan parallels Falun Gong and Buddhism by saying the two share a central doctrine of goodness and unconditional compassion towards others. Chan also provides a point of differentiation between Falun Gong and Buddhism. Penny writes that another one of Li Hongzhi's critiques of Buddhism is that the original form of Buddhism, Sakyamuni's Buddhism, was somehow pure, it has declined over the centuries through the intervention of a degenerate priesthood, thus distorting the Buddhist Dharma. Falun Gong teaches the essential elevation of good as a governing norm, where good creates the society, although in a conservative way.

According to Ownby, the three central pillars of Falun Gong are the "moral qualities cultivators are enjoined to practice in their own lives [are] truth, compassion and forbearance". Li taught that the goal of cultivation is one of spiritual elevation, achieved by "eliminating karma—the built-up sins of past and present lives which often manifest themselves in individuals as illness—and accumulating virtue". Through cultivation, Falun Gong "promised personal harmony with the very substance of the universe". In line with Falun Gong's consistent allusions to Oriental traditions, Li criticized the "self-imposed limits" of modern science and viewed traditional Chinese science as an entirely different, yet equally valid knowledge system. Yet he also borrowed from modern scientific ideas to represent part of the Falun Gong doctrine—notably by making references to atomic theory and nuclear energy. By introducing scientific elements into his teachings, Li hoped to avoid Falun Gong being characterized as a traditional, superstitious belief system, and to gain a wider following among the educated. New Zealand scholar Heather Kavan wrote that Falun Gong members have repeated the principles of "truthfulness, compassion, forbearance" to outsiders to evade deeper inquiry. Kavan said that Li instructed his followers to lie to outsiders about Falun Gong.

China scholar Benjamin Penny's 2005 publication The Falun Gong, Buddhism and "Buddhist qigong" says that after the crackdown, the Chinese Buddhist Association was eager to denounce Falun Gong, and other Buddhist groups followed suit in fear of religious persecution. He also states that the Buddhist community's response to Falun Gong could also have been due in part to Falun Gong's rapid growth in China. According to Penny, Li says that the features of the Buddha School include the cultivation of Buddhahood and the belief in predestined relationships, which are included in the teachings of Falun Gong.

Maria Chang believes that Li's teaching on the "Dharma-ending period" and his remarks about providing salvation "in the final period of the Last Havoc" are apocalyptic. Penny dissuades from considering Falun Gong as one of "these genuinely apocalyptic groups", and says that Li Hongzhi's teachings ought to be considered in the context of a "much more Buddhist notion of the cycle of the Dharma or the Buddhist law".

=== Qigong ===
Qigong refers to various traditional cultivation practices involving movements or regulated breathing. Qigong may be practiced to improve health, as a medical profession, as a spiritual path, or as a component of Chinese martial arts.

The term qigong was coined in the early 1950s as an alternative label to ancient spiritual disciplines rooted in Buddhism or Taoism that promoted the belief in the supernatural, immortality and pursuit of spiritual transcendence. The new term was constructed to avoid danger of association with ancient spiritual practices that were labeled "superstitious" and persecuted during the Maoist era of the People's Republic of China. At a time when spirituality and religion were looked down upon, the concept was "tolerated" because it carried with it no overt religious or spiritual elements, and in the post-Cultural Revolution reform environment of the 1980s and 1990s, when many had felt a spiritual vacuum, millions flocked to it. Other scholars argue that the immense popularity of qigong in China could, in part, lie in the fact that the public saw in it a way to improve and maintain health. This became a social phenomenon of considerable importance.

In 1992, Li introduced Falun Gong, along with teachings that touched upon a wide range of topics, from detailed exposition on qigong-related phenomena and cultivation practice to science and morality. In the next few years, Falun Gong quickly grew in popularity across China. Falun Gong was welcomed into the state-controlled Scientific Qigong Research Association, which sponsored and helped to organize many of his activities between 1992 and 1994, including 54 large-scale lectures. In 1992 and 1993, he won government awards at the Beijing Oriental Health Expos, including the "Qigong Master most acclaimed by the Masses" and "The Award for Advancing Boundary Science".

Li Hongzhi's books' content includes commentaries on questions that have been discussed in China's qigong community for ages. According to Ownby, Li saw the qigong movement as "rife with false teachings and greedy and fraudulent 'masters'" and set out to rectify it. Li understood himself and Falun Gong as part of a "centuries-old tradition of cultivation", and in his texts, would often attack those who taught "incorrect, deviant, or heterodox ways". Qigong scholar David Palmer says Li "redefined his method as having entirely different objectives from qigong: the purpose of practice should neither be physical health nor the development of Extraordinary Powers, but to purify one's heart and attain spiritual salvation...Falun Gong no longer presented itself as a qigong method but as the Great Law or Dharma (Fa) of the universe."

In one of his lectures, Li stated that Falun Dafa can enable people to ascend to high levels in the process of cultivation.

Both its popular name, Falun Gong, and its preferred name, Falun Dafa, highlight its practical and spiritual dimensions, according to Zhao. Falun Gong literally means "Practice of the Law Wheel (Dharma Chakra)" which refers to a series of five meditative exercises aimed at channeling and harmonizing the qi or vital energy. Theories about the flow and function of qi are basic to traditional Chinese medicine and health-enhancing qigong exercises. Zhao says that traditional Chinese culture assumes "a profound interpretation of matter and spirit, body and soul", and Falun Gong "emphasizes the unity of physical and spiritual healing, in contrast to the Western distinction between medicine and religion". To bring about health benefits, the physical exercises must be accompanied by moral cultivation and spiritual exercises as a way of focusing the mind. For Falun Gong, the virtues to cultivate are "truthfulness", "benevolence," and "forbearance".

Falun Gong draws on oriental mysticism and traditional Chinese medicine, criticizes self-imposed limits of modern science, and views traditional Chinese science as an entirely different yet equally valid knowledge system. Concomitantly, says Zhao, it borrows the language of modern science in representing its cosmic laws. According to Zhao, "Falun gong is not conceptualized as a religious faith; on the contrary, its practitioners, who include doctorate holders from prestigious American universities, see it as 'a new form of science.'"

Prominent Falun Gong scholar David Ownby delineates three core themes in the teachings: first, "Li presents his vision both as a return to a lost, or neglected spiritual tradition, and as a major contribution to modern science"; second, "Falun Gong is profoundly moral"; third, "Falun Dafa promises practitioners supernatural powers through moral practice without pursuing for or abusing these powers". Ownby also lists its "Chineseness" as a major part of the practice's appeal.

All over China before July 1999, says Palmer, the same scene could be observed at dawn: "Hundreds of people in the parks and on the sidewalks, practising the slow-motion Falun Gong exercises to the rhythm of taped music ... yellow and red Fa banners hanging from trees presented the method and its principles. In the evenings, practitioners would often meet in a disciple's home to read Zhuan Falun, discuss its teachings, and exchange cultivation experiences."

== Cultivation ==
From the beginning, Li has asserted his absolute authority over the transmission of the teachings and the use of healing powers of Falun Gong: he said in Changchun that only he is possessed of these right, and any who violate are to be expelled. Li said that it is a violation of Dafa to treat other people's illnesses or invite others to come to a practice point to be treated. If such that happens, then the violator is not considered by Li to be his disciple. He calls on his disciples to replace assistants who violate the commandment. Also, Li wrote in Zhuan Falun prohibiting his followers charging fees for workshops, saying that if they do so, "his dharma bodies will take away everything that they have, so that they will no longer belong to Falun Dafa, and what they teach will not be Falun Dafa."

Li Hongzhi describes Falun Gong as a "high-level cultivation practice" which, in the past, "served as an intensive cultivation method that required practitioners with extremely high Xinxing (mind-nature) or great inborn quality"; he teaches that practice will reveal the principles of the universe and life at different levels to those who dedicate themselves to its study. By cultivating xinxing to assimilate to the nature of the universe, and by eliminating karma though enduring tribulations and hardships, one can return to the "original, true self", and understand the truth of human life. In Falun Dafa, Truthfulness (Zhen 真), Compassion (Shan 善), Forbearance (Ren 忍) is seen as the fundamental characteristic of the cosmos, and the process of cultivation, one of the practitioner assimilating himself to this by letting go of attachments and negative thoughts. In Zhuan Falun, Li Hongzhi says that if one assimilates oneself to the characteristic as a practitioner, then that person has attained the Tao.

Falun Gong echoes traditional Chinese beliefs that humans are connected to the universe through mind and body, according to Danny Schechter. Li challenges "conventional mentalities", and sets out to unveil myths of the universe, time-space, and the human body.

Li says that raising one's xinxing is fundamental to cultivating oneself. Improving xinxing means relinquishing human attachments and notions, which prevent people from awakening. The term attachment can refer to jealousy, competitiveness, fame, showing off, pursuit of material gain, anger, lust and similar traits. In Zhuan Falun, he states that ill thoughts among everyday people must be eliminated—only then can one move up.

Li argues that having material possessions itself is not a problem, but that the problem is with developing attachments to material things. Ownby says that for Li Hongzhi, an attachment is "literally any desire, emotion, habit, or orientation which stands between a practitioner (or any human being for that matter) and the pursuit of truth and cultivation". At the beginning of Zhuan Falun Li says that the process of cultivation "is one of constantly giving up human attachments", such as competition, deception, and harm for even a little personal gain.

Li also says that loss and gain does not refer to the loss of money or the gain of comfort, rather the measure of how many human attachments one can lose, and how much one can enlighten in the course of cultivation practice.

Ownby regards as most difficult to practice Li's requirement for practitioners to reduce the attachment to sentimentality or qing (情). In Lecture Four of Zhuan Falun Li says that human beings can be human on account of sentimentality, and they live just for it. In order to succeed in cultivation practice, sentimentality must be given up. Ownby regards this as "quite Buddhist, as it is a way out of the web of human relations...and thus a step toward individual enlightenment".

Ownby says that Li urges practitioners to abandon human attachments not for achieving selfish ends, but "quite the contrary. Practitioners are enjoined to treat others with compassion and benevolence in order to cultivate virtue and work off karma." He says that such compassion and benevolence should not be reserved to those with whom one had a prior attachment, nor should the goal be to inspire gratitude or love; instead, it's "to conform to the nature of the universe". Li also insists that practitioners do not withdraw from the world, and that they maintain interactions with non-practitioners, including "even those who are hostile to practice". The point here, according to Ownby, is that before the practitioner cultivates to such a point that they are dispassionate in their compassion, the stress experienced in the secular environment "constitutes a form of suffering which will enable them to reduce their karma".

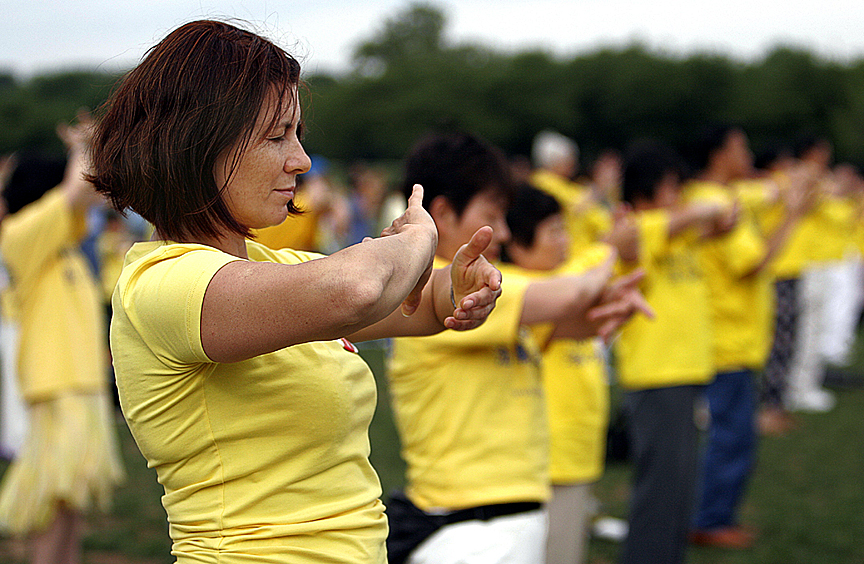
A group of people practicing the fourth exercise of Falun Dafa

=== Zhuan Falun, the main book ===
The teachings of Falun Gong are encompassed in two central works: Falun Gong and Zhuan Falun:

- Falun Gong is an introductory book that discusses qigong, introduces the principles of the practice, and provides illustrations and explanations of the exercises.
- Zhuan Falun is the main teaching and the most comprehensive work; it is an edited version of Li's nine-lecture series, 54 of which he taught across China between 1992 and 1994.

Ownby regards Falun Gong and Zhuan Falun to be largely consistent in terms of content, though he says "important differences in nuance distinguish the two". The World Book encyclopedia describes the contents of Zhuan Falun as examining "evolution, the meaning of space and time, and the mysteries of the universe". Penny commented in 2003 "after Falun Gong's ban in mainland China in 1999, new editions of Falun Gong's books no longer contain biographies of Li. These changes seem to reflect a larger trend of Li retreating from the public eye. Since 2000 he has very rarely appeared in public, his presence almost entirely being electronic or re-routed through quotations on Falun Gong's websites. Li Hongzhi's biography were removed from Falun Gong websites some time after 2001". Kavan stated in July 2008 that the English translation of part of the text (Zhuan Falun volume II) was not offered on-line. It would seem that the missing translation was published online in June 2008 as "volume II".

Benjamin Penny noted that, at the beginning of the first chapter of Zhuan Falun, Li explains how Falun Gong differs from other qigong movements, which were primarily concerned with health and fitness. Li wrote, "At present, I am the only person genuinely teaching qigong towards higher levels at home and abroad". He then asks, "Isn't this offering salvation to humankind?"

Li says constant study will lead the practitioner to the final goal of "Consummation", or enlightenment. He says that by reading Zhuan Falun repeatedly, and acting according to its principles, practitioners assimilate themselves to the fundamental characteristic of the universe: Zhen 真, Shan 善 and Ren 忍, "Truthfulness-Compassion-Forbearance".

Topics Zhuan Falun expounds on include: Zhen 真, Shan 善 Ren 忍 is the Sole Criterion to Discern Good and Bad People, Buddha School Qigong and Buddhism, Supernormal Abilities, Loss and Gain, Transformation of Karma, Upgrading Xinxing (Mind nature and moral quality), Cultivation of Mind and Body, Cultivation of Speech, The Issue of Eating Meat, The Issue of Treating Illness, Qi Gong and Physical Exercises, Enlightenment etc.

Since 1992, Li has given Falun Gong lectures that have been transcribed and posted to the internet. He emphasizes that Zhuan Falun should be viewed as the main guide for cultivation practice. In 2007 he said this recent lectures are supplementary to Zhuan Falun, and that Zhuan Falun should be studied frequently."

=== Zhen 真, Shan 善, Ren 忍 ===
Falun Gong states that the fundamental characteristic of the universe is Zhen 真, Shan 善 Ren 忍, or "Truthfulness-Compassion-Forbearance". In Zhuan Falun Li says that the characteristic, Zhen-Shan-Ren, is in the microscopic particles of air, rock, wood, soil, iron and steel, the human body, as well as in all matter. "In ancient times it was said that the Five Elements constitute all things and matter in the universe; they also carry this characteristic, Zhen-Shan-Ren."

Ownby refers to Li's discussion of the moral universe, where "The very structure of the universe, according to Li Hongzhi, is made up of moral qualities that cultivators are enjoined to practice in their own lives: truth, compassion and forbearance. The goal of cultivation, and hence of life itself, is spiritual elevation, achieved through eliminating negative karma...and accumulating virtue."

Li teaches that practitioners are to assimilate their thoughts and actions to these principles, wherein higher aspects of the mysteries of the universe and life will be revealed: "A practitioner can only understand the specific manifestation of the Buddha Fa at the level that his or her cultivation has reached, which is his or her cultivation Fruit Status and level."

== Practice ==
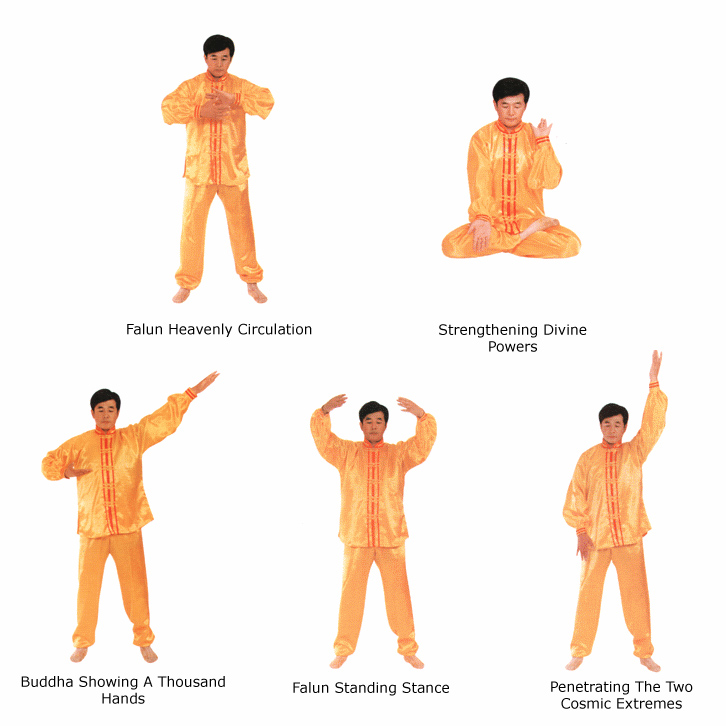

The movement is named after Falun (Dharma or Law Wheel) in which Li teaches is a supernatural entity that he telekinetically installs in the lower abdomen of his followers and which is visualized as a spinning wheel. Li teaches that as the wheel spins, it promotes good health and provide followers with immunity from diseases. Practitioners are taught five exercises to help cultivate their Falun.

The term "practice" refers to the five exercises, one of which is a sitting meditation. In the book Falun Gong, Li Hongzhi describes the principles behind the exercises.

He says the exercises are part of the "harmonization and perfection" in the practice, and what make it a "comprehensive mind-body cultivation system". Li says that though Falun Gong requires both cultivation and practice, cultivation of xinxing is actually more important. However, "A person who only cultivates his xinxing and does not perform the exercises of the Great Consummation Way will find the growth of his gong potency impeded and his original-body (benti) unchanged."

- The First Exercise: Buddha Showing a Thousand Hands:

This exercise involves stretching movements which are aimed at "open[ing] up all energy channels" in one's body. In Falun Gong, Li states that "beginners will be able to acquire energy in a short period of time and experienced practitioners can quickly improve." It is said to "break through areas where the energy is blocked, to enable energy to circulate freely and smoothly, to mobilize the energy within the body and under the skin, circulating it vigorously, and to absorb a great amount of energy from the universe". It is composed of eight movements.

- The Second Exercise: Falun Standing Stance:

This exercise is a tranquil standing meditation composed of four standing stances.

- The Third Exercise: Penetrating the Two Cosmic Extremes:

The aim of this exercise, as stated in Falun Gong, is "to penetrate the cosmic energy and mix it with the energy inside of one's body", in order to "reach the state of 'a Pure-White Body' quickly".

- The Fourth Exercise: Falun Heavenly Circuit:

Falun Gong says the fourth exercise is "intermediate-level" and is on the basis of the previous three sets of exercises. Li says the most outstanding feature of this exercise is "to use the rotation of Falun to rectify all the abnormal conditions of the human body, so that the human body, the small cosmos, returns to its original state and the energy of the whole body can circulate freely and smoothly".

- The Fifth Exercise: Strengthening Divine Powers:

The fifth exercise of intermediate-level has a set of Buddha Mudras or Buddhist Hand Gestures that precede tranquil meditation.

== Teleology of practice ==
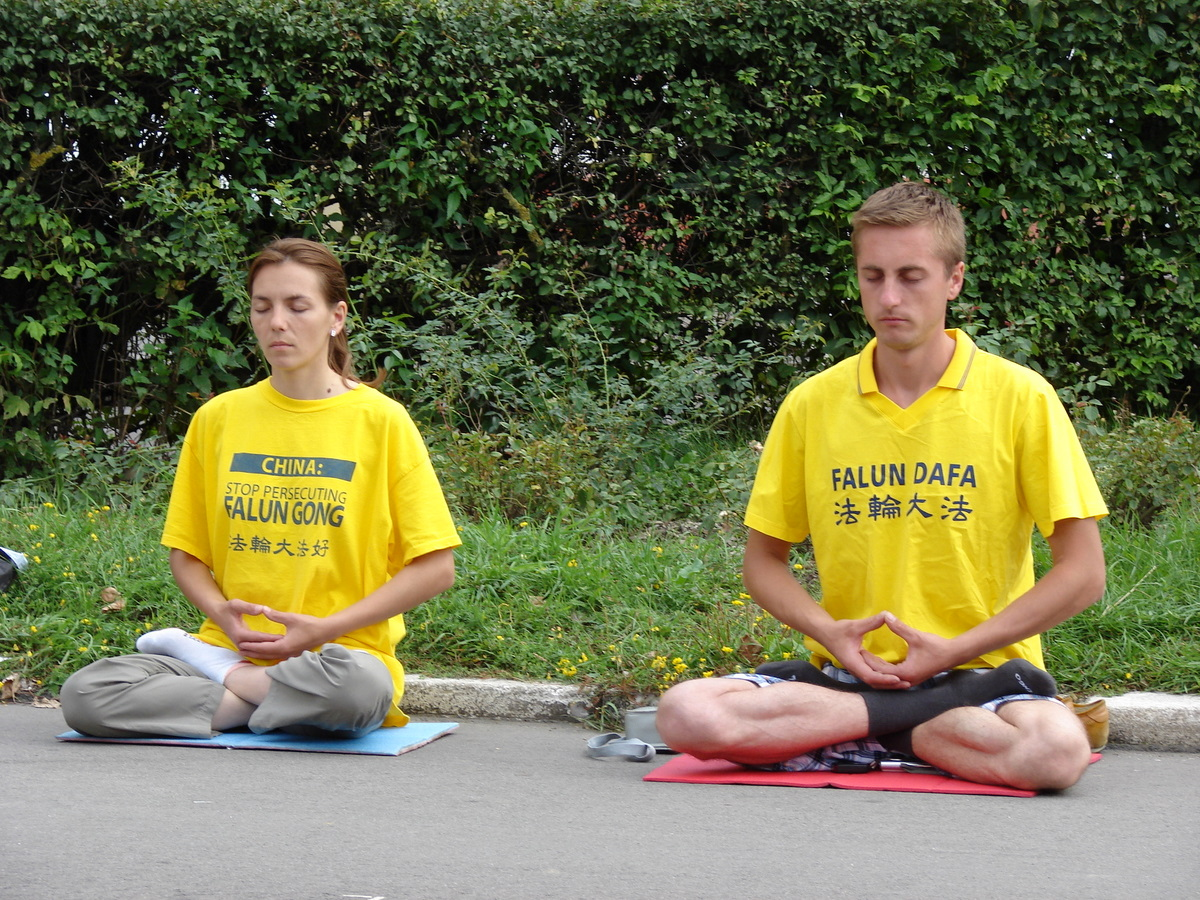

In Zhuan Falun Li says that human life is not created in ordinary human society, but "in the space of the universe". He says that the universe is benevolent to begin with, and "embodies the characteristic of Zhen-Shan-Ren". When a life is created, it is assimilated to the characteristic of the universe. However, eventually a web of relations developed, and selfishness came about; gradually the level of beings' was lowered until, in the end, they reached this level of human beings. Li says in his book that the purpose of being human is to practice cultivation and return to the "original, true self".

Ownby interprets Li's meaning as "humans were originally gods of some sort, who lost their status as life became 'complicated' (a word with more negative connotations in Chinese than in English) and they engaged in immoral behavior. Presumably, humans can redeem themselves through cultivation and regain their divine status."

Li teaches maintaining virtue in everyday life, by cultivating or improving xinxing through slowly acknowledging and discarding human desires and attachments. A practitioner must also be able to endure hardships and tribulations to reduce karma, which Li says is a negative, black substance that blocks people from enlightening to spiritual truths. Its opposite, virtue, is said to be a white substance gained by doing good deeds and forbearing through hardships. Li teaches that virtue may be transformed into gong, or "cultivation energy", which is said to be an everlasting, fundamental energy a human spirit possesses, and what ultimately dictates where the spirit goes after death.

Li states that an important aspect of his system is its cultivation of the Main Spirit. He says that a person is made up of a Primordial Spirit, which could be composed of one's Main Spirit and one or more Assistant Spirits. Li states that the Main Spirit is the part of one's consciousness that one perceives as one's own self, and is the spirit that humans must cultivate to ascend to higher levels. A person can also have one or more Assistant spirits. Zhuan Falun says that upon death, both spirits split from the body and go their own ways. In practices that cultivate the Assistant Spirit, the Assistant Spirit will reincarnate into another body to continue cultivating, whereas the Main Spirit, which is the person themselves, will be left with nothing and upon reincarnation will not remember its past. It will be left to live locked in the human dimension, in delusion. Li also teaches that practices that teach trance, mantras, and visualization, only focus on the Assistant Spirit.

According to Human Rights Watch (HRW), there is both salvationist and apocalyptic ideas within Falun Gong teachings. Falun Gong promises salvation to those who follow what it describes as the "righteous way". HRW notes that Li taught that human civilization had gone through "complete annihilation" 81 times throughout history, with only a small number of people surviving each cycle to enter the next period and restart a new civilisation at a primitive level.

== Regarding Li Hongzhi ==
David Palmer notes that an authorized bibliography published on Falun Gong's website had taught that Li Hongzhi had received spiritual teachings from multiple masters from a young age and to have developed "immense supernatural abilities" at the age of eight before founding Falun Gong.

Li asserts that he possesses the ultimate truth of the universe, that he can assume incarnations to protect his followers, and that he can install a spinning wheel of energy in the abdomen of Falun Gong practitioners.

According to scholar James R. Lewis, Li had changed his recorded birthday from 7 July 1952, to 13 May in 1951. Lewis notes that 13 May is the date traditionally celebrated as Sakyamuni Buddha's birthday. Li explained that he made this change to correct a government misprint however Lewis questions this explanation as Li was already over 40 when he supposedly "corrected" the date and that the change occurred in 1994 when Li was in the process of recasting Falun Gong as a Buddhist movement. Lewis also notes that David Ownby, who self-described himself as a "friend of Falun Gong", found the co-incidence difficult to accept from a non-practitioner's perspective, writing that "such a coincidence strains credulity".

Some scholars suggest that Li Hongzhi assumes the role of a supernatural entity within the teachings of Falun Gong: Maria Hsia Chang, for example, opines that "If Li Hongzhi's disciples can become gods by engaging in Falun Gong, it stands to reason that the founder of this cultivation practice must himself be a deity." However, Ian Johnson suggests that Li emphasises his teachings as simple revelations of "eternal truths", known since time immemorial but which have been corrupted over the course of time. Johnson opines that Li does not claim to be a messiah or god, but "only a wise teacher who has seen the light"

However, contrary to Johnson, David Palmer writes that Li's teachings presented him as an "omniscient and omnipotent saviour of the entire universe" who unlike the Buddha or other gods, have revealed the "Fundamental law of the universe" to humanity for the first time in history. Palmer notes that Li presents the "law" as the only means of protection against an apocalyptic event. Similarly, scholar James R. Lewis writes that Li taught that the historic Buddha and other gods had not revealed the entire Buddha Fa to humanity. Instead, Li claimed that through Falun Dafa, he had "for the first time in history", introduced the "whole Buddha Law to human beings" thereby presenting his teachings as a uniquely complete revelation even in relation to Sakyamuni.

Lewis, who analyzed Li Hongzhi's statements in their broader context, cautions that isolated quotations can be misleading. He points to Li's statement saying that "ordinary people" may regard him as merely an "average common man" but notes that the surrounding passages however present a very different picture of Li's self claimed spiritual status; where although Li describes himself as having an "ordinary person's physical body" - he simultaneously identifies himself as the Master who is transmitting the Fa and was the first person to have ever revealed the complete Buddha Fa to humanity. Lewis interprets these statements as indicating a spiritual status far beyond that of an "ordinary" person.

Palmer similarly writes that Li taught that his book Zhuan Falun teaches the "Great Law of the universe" in which is being revealed to humanity "for the first time" in history, although Li claims that this law had been "transmitted on a large scale in a previous universal cycle" hundreds of millions of years ago. Palmer notes that Li portrays his teachings as surpassing anything that was previously taught by religion or philosophy, characterizing older religious teachings and spiritual practices of the past as merely "lower-level forms" of the Great Dharma. Li taught that Sakyamuni's teachings only applied to the Milky Way whereas Falun Gong was superior where it applied to the "entire universe".

== On science ==
Scholars have noted that a consistent theme in Li Hongzhi's teachings is that modern science is limited and ignorant of the true nature of the universe, while Li presents Falun Gong teachings as a superior form of knowledge.

Examples of Li's claims have included that archeological evidence support the existence of ancient advanced civilizations millions of years ago, that the holes in the ozone layer above Antarctica were opened up by the gods to help the Earth ventilate its "poisoned and polluted" air, and that modern medicine cannot properly cure diseases because their underlying cause is karmic debt, which is beyond the ability of modern medical science to address.

Scholar Helen Farley writes that Li Hongzhi is "often actively hostile" towards science and teaches that it should be abandoned because it is harmful to societal morals. Farley argues that Li "never follows any scientific principles in his deliberations" and frequently distorts scientific facts to serve his own purposes. She also notes that Li frequently rejects established findings of modern science, such as Darwin's theory of evolution, while nevertheless is "more than happy to use the language of science" to make his own pseudoscience teachings to sound plausible.

Li has claimed modern science was introduced to humanity through the influences of aliens and functions as a tool used to help the aliens to both infiltrate and take control of humanity. He had also taught that aliens assigned serial numbers to humans who are capable of using computers. In a 1999 TIME interview, he stated that it's a misconception that humans made modern science on their own, instead that it resulted from extraterrestrial manipulation. He stated that aliens introduced modern technologies like computers and airplanes and began by teaching humanity modern science for the purpose of making people increasingly believe in science and thereby "to control human culture and spirituality". Li further teaches that modern science is ignorant of the "real truths" of the Universe while presenting his book, Zhuan Falun as the "ultimate science".

Similarly, scholar David A. Palmer writes that Falun Gong teachings warns that "modern science is an extra-terrestrial plot" and that practitioners should avoid it. Instead, practitioners are encouraged to devote themselves to Zhuan Falun, which Falun Gong recommends reading daily. Palmer notes that Falun Gong presents Li's teachings as the "higher law" that makes both traditional religion and modern science redundant.

David Ownby writes that one of Li Hongzhi's "favorite themes" of discussion involves modern science. He states that a significant aspect of what makes Falun Gong appealing, especially to Chinese intellectuals, lies in “its promise to wed modern science to Chinese traditions.” Li both appreciates “what modern science has accomplished” and recognizes “its limitations". Ownby elaborates;

Again and again in his lectures, he returns to the limitations of the scientiﬁc paradigm and the blind arrogance of the world scientiﬁc community. Not that Li’s vision is antiscientiﬁc or necessarily antimodern in the way that, say, some Mennonites’ world views might be understood to be. On the contrary, Li claims to speak the language of modern science and seems quite content that his followers take advantage of all that modern science has to offer—indeed, without modern telecommunications, most notably the Internet, Falun Gong most certainly would not have achieved its present form.

Ownby noted that Li's teachings is directed toward attempting to show what Li claimed as "the sole avenue toward genuine understanding of the true meaning of the universe", which he often labels the 'Buddha Fa'."

In a 1999 Time interview, Li warned that modern science is destroying mankind. He said that, in the future, human limbs will become deformed, and internal organs will be impaired as a result of industrial pollution. Falun Dafa materials describe a two-billion-year-old nuclear reactor in Africa, claimed to be an artifact of an advanced ancient civilization. The reactor is said to disprove Darwin's theory of evolution.

Ownby says his fieldwork demonstrates that Li's discussions of and challenges to modern science struck a chord with many Chinese intellectuals who took up Falun Gong practice. They say that in discussing the relationship of science "to larger cosmic structures and existential questions", Li has made science more relevant than before. Li's ultimate aim in talking about science is to "illustrate the limitations of scientific knowledge so as to make space for his own vision, which transcends science and returns it to a secondary, subservient role in our understanding of cosmic and human forces." He attempts to do this with a number of strategies, Ownby says, including purported evidence from "parascientific research". This includes claims of archaeological findings from hundreds of millions of years ago which undermine the theory of evolution. Li suggests, Ownby says, that "scientific paradigms are historically and culturally bound and thus epistemologically incapable of validating their own claims to authority".v

Ownby says that according to Li, one of science's major shortcomings is its inability to understand the idea of multiple dimensions - that the universe exists at "many different levels simultaneously and that the process of enlightenment consists of passing through these levels to arrive at ever more complete understandings". Li tells his disciples in Falun Buddha Fa: Lectures in the United States about the complexity of the cosmos.

Ownby says that overall Li's discussion on the topic is simple, and attempts to sum up it up:

"He invokes apparent anomalies in the archaeological or geological record to call into question the authority of the scientific consensus. On the basis of that challenge...he goes on to suggest a less human-centred view of the universe composed of hierarchically linked levels...Through cultivation, humans can transcend the level into which they were born."

Ownby regards Li's arguments as unconvincing, and believes that Li is not particularly interested in scientific debate, or in those who do not believe or who doubt him: "his concern is rather to illustrate, to those who are attracted to such a message, that Falun Dafa both contains within it and transcends the modern scientific viewpoint."

== On race ==
Li Hongzhi has suggested that paradises are racially segregated, saying that Falun Gong's cosmology teaches that different ethnicities each have a correspondence to their own heavens, and that individuals of mixed race lose some aspect of this connection. Li had also claimed that race-mixing was part of a plot by extraterrestrials to help break humanity away from the gods. In a 2020 ABC investigation, a mixed-race girl said she had learned from Falun Gong that its leader claimed race-mixing in humans was "part of an alien plot to drive humanity further from the gods".

David Palmer writes that Li taught that "the white race has its Heaven, which occupies a tiny part of the universe", while "the yellow race has its Buddha-world and Tao-world" and fills "almost the whole universe". Palmer further notes that Li teaches that children born from interracial marriages are not linked to any heaven as "they have lost their root".

Scholar Helen Farley writes that Li Hongzhi taught that the "Cosmic Law" does not allow race-mixing. According to Farley, Li blamed modern science for race-mixing and explained that originally the West and the East were kept apart by "vast deserts" but modern science had taken away the obstacles so "that races may mix". Radio France Internationale (RFI) similarly reported that Falun Gong teachings state that "the races in the world are not allowed to be mixed up" and that "mixed races have lost their roots" and "belong to nowhere". Palmer likewise reports Li has stated that "mixing the races of the world is not allowed" and described racial mixing as a "grave problem". James R. Lewis wrote that Li teaches that race-mixing is both a "symptom of degeneration" and a cause of a "catastrophe", quoting Li:

"human races are becoming more and more mixed. These have indeed driven humankind to a very dangerous stage – this is certain. As I said, catastrophes happen because humankind is depraved."

Similarly, journalist Craig S. Smith wrote that Li has taught that interracial children were the "spawn of the Dharma Ending Period", a Buddhist reference to a period marking "unprecedented moral degeneration". Smith also cited an interview in which Li taught that people of a single race have a place in heaven designated for their racial category, whereas "interracial children have no place in heaven without his intervention."

Benjamin Penny noted that Falun Gong teaches the belief in reincarnation and that mixed-race people's souls (original spirits) retain a single racial identity. Li teaches that mixed-race people can nevertheless achieve "Consummation" if they become cultivators, explaining:

Fortunately, they too can attain Consummation, but apparently, despite the “mixed” status of their bodies, their original spirit maintains one fixed racial identity. If they’re cultivators, their outward appearances are no longer important and it all depends on the person’s original spirit. If his original spirit is white, he’s white; if his original spirit is yellow, he’s yellow; if his original spirit is black, he’s black.

Falun Gong describes Consummation as the ultimate spiritual goal where one can achieve spiritual perfection. Penny explains that Consummation amounts to "returning to origin" and regaining the divine status of gods and Buddhas, constituting the path to salvation from humanity's fallen state. However Palmer noted Li taught that orthodox religions like Buddhism and Taoism are now "incapable of achieving salvation" and he was the only person to teach the "true Dharma" that can guide adherents to Consummation.

The editorial board of South Asian Post reported that Li taught that children born from interracial marriages are intellectually and physically "incomplete" and that Li can resolve this supposed deficiency through cultivation, if they choose to practice it. Palmer likewise cites Li as teaching that race mixing causes the bodies and intelligence of mixed-race children to become unhealthy, and that modern science knows that a mixed-race generation is "inferior to the preceding one" of racially unmixed parents. Investigative journalist Ethan Gutmann noted that interracial marriage is common in the Falun Gong community.

== On homosexuality ==
The founder said in 1998 that homosexuality makes one "unworthy of being human", creates bad karma, and is comparable to organized crime. He also taught that "disgusting homosexuality shows the dirty abnormal psychology of the gay who has lost his ability of reasoning", and that homosexuality is a "filthy, deviant state of mind." Li additionally stated in a 1998 speech in Switzerland that, "gods' first target of annihilation would be homosexuals." Although gay, lesbian, and bisexual people may practice Falun Gong, founder Li stated that they must "give up the bad conduct" of all same-sex sexual activity.

In a 2020 article in the peer-reviewed Journal of Religion and Violence, James R. Lewis, an American philosophy professor at Wuhan University, wrote that Li attributed the fall of ancient Greek culture to the ancient Greeks' acceptance of homosexuality. He claimed that when people overstepped their boundaries through homosexual behaviour, they were no longer deemed as human beings despite retaining the outer appearance of humans. Li took aim at the legalization of homosexuality in progressive countries and rejected the notion that people can simply be born gay, instead teaching that the mentality underlying homosexuality was derived from harmful influences acquired after birth. Li had taught that no matter what the human-made laws permitting homosexuality were, such laws are not the "truth of the universe," and that governments make laws to rule and punish others, or to protect things and gain votes; thus, such laws were not made with "good intentions."

According to Lewis, after Li had become conscious of the poor reception of his socially reactionary views among Western audience, he moderated his presentation of his teachings on homosexuality after 1999. For example, in a 2006 Q&A session, when a disciple asked about the most effective way to "save" homosexual people, Li had reportedly answered that they would be less likely to be saved if treated as a "special group", and that the best way to save them is to treat them "like everyone else".

A 2020 ABC investigation interviewed a former Falun Gong practitioner who identified as homosexual. She told the ABC that she felt she needed to hide her deepest thoughts and that Li's teaching that homosexuality was wrong and creates negative karma played on her mind.

== Transformation and higher dimensions ==
Connected with Li's discussion of cultivation practice is the idea of "supernormal abilities" and "special powers" that the adherent is supposed to develop in the course of dedicated study. These are connected to Li's teachings on apparent higher-dimensional realities, which he says exist simultaneously and in parallel to the human dimension. Li teaches that supernormal powers are a by-product of moral transcendence, and are never sought after or to be employed for selfish intentions. He has said that there are up to 10,000 supernatural powers, though as Ownby says, has never listed them. Some of those he has discussed include the opening of the celestial eye, "which may enable practitioners to see into other spatial dimensions and/or through walls" according to Ownby, clairvoyance, precognition, levitation, and "the ability to transform one kind of object into another kind of object" according to Penny, among others.

Penny says the practitioner is supposed to pass through various levels until he or she reaches the state of "cultivation of a Buddha's body".

David Ownby says that Li regards his discussion of multiple dimensions as a superior approach to knowledge and understanding. One of science's major shortcomings, according to Li, is its inability to detect multiple dimensions. "Li argues that the universe—and human understanding of the universe—exists at many different levels simultaneously and that the process of enlightenment consists of passing through these levels to arrive at ever more complete understandings." In this context, transformation is both physical and intellectual. The motor behind such transformation is individual moral practice, alongside cultivation under an orthodox master. Moral practice, says Ownby, is a necessary but not sufficient condition for cultivation and enlightenment. Individual moral practice burns karma and reduces suffering, but unless the individual is committed to an orthodox cultivation regime, they will not be able to break through the various "levels" and attain enlightenment and transformation. "What is required in this instance is a master, someone who has...the power to channel the moral behaviour and intentions of the practitioner in the proper direction." This leads to the oft-repeated phrase in Li's texts: "cultivation depends on oneself, gong depends on the Master" (修在自己，功在師父).

Sociologist Richard Madsen says "among the Falun Dafa practitioners I have met are Chinese scientists with doctorates from prestigious American universities who claim that modern physics (for example, superstring theory) and biology (specifically the pineal gland's functioning) provide a scientific basis for their beliefs. From their point of view, Falun Dafa is knowledge rather than religion, a new form of science rather than faith."

Maria Hsia Chang regards Li's teachings on these subjects "abstruse". Ownby acknowledges these as challenges to interpreting Li's message, but attempts to place Falun Gong doctrine within its historical and cultural context. Penny says "there are aspects of Falun Gong doctrine that could have been understood by a cultivator in China 1000 years ago," along with some of the teachings, such as those about extraterrestrials, for example, "that could not have appeared in China before the late 1980s". He says this is a "synthesis of age-old traditions and contemporary modes".

Schechter reports a discussion with Falun Gong spokesman Erping Zhang on the subject, when he asked for Zhang's views on "higher consciousness" in this connection. Zhang said: "Higher consciousness is a commonly used term in Eastern cultivation [where] … one can reach a higher level of consciousness via meditation. Higher consciousness may also refer to consciousness beyond this physical dimension. Levitation is a phenomenon or a by-product of one's cultivation of mind and body." The phenomenon of levitation seems also mentioned, in passing, in one of the lectures. Li says the phenomenon of levitation is possible because once the human body's matter, which is "related to the Earth and is composed of surface-matter particles", has undergone transformation through cultivation of human-body, "it has severed its connection to the particles in this environment, and hence is no longer restricted by cohesive forces caused by interaction of matter of this particular realm."

=== Karma and the cycle of rebirth ===
Falun Gong teaches that the spirit is locked in the cycle of rebirth, also known as samsara due to the accumulation of karma. This is a negative, black substance that accumulates in the body. Falun Gong states that karma is the reason for suffering, and what ultimately blocks people from the truth of the universe and attaining enlightenment. At the same time, is also the cause of ones continued rebirth and suffering. Li says that due to accumulation of karma the human spirit upon death will reincarnate over and over again, until the karma is paid off or eliminated through cultivation, or the person is destroyed due to the bad deeds he has done.

Ownby regards the concept of karma as a cornerstone to individual moral behaviour in Falun Gong, and also readily traceable to the Christian doctrine of "one reaps what one sows". Ownby says Falun Gong is differentiated by a "system of transmigration" though, "in which each organism is the reincarnation of a previous life form, its current form having been determined by karmic calculation of the moral qualities of the previous lives lived." Ownby says the seeming unfairness of manifest inequities can then be explained, at the same time allowing a space for moral behaviour in spite of them. In the same vein of Li's monism, matter and spirit are one, karma is identified as a black substance which must be purged in the process of cultivation.

Falun Gong differs from Buddhism in its definition of the term "karma", Ownby says, in that it is taken not as a process of award and punishment, but as an exclusively negative term. The Chinese term "de" or "virtue" is reserved for what might otherwise be termed "good karma" in Buddhism. Karma is understood as the source of all suffering - what Buddhism might refer to as "bad karma" or "sinful karma". Li says that the bad things a person has done over his many lifetimes result in misfortune for ordinary people, and karmic obstacles for cultivators, along with birth, aging, sickness, and death.

Ownby regards this as the basis for Falun Gong's apparent "opposition to practitioners' taking medicine when ill; they are missing an opportunity to work off karma by allowing an illness to run its course (suffering depletes karma) or to fight the illness through cultivation." Penny shares this interpretation. Since Li believes that "karma is the primary factor that causes sickness in people", Penny asks: "if disease comes from karma and karma can be eradicated through cultivation of xinxing, then what good will medicine do?"

== On healing and medicine ==
According to Radio France Internationale (RFI), Falun Gong adherents are attracted to the claim that by controlling the "Dharma Wheel", which is said to rotate inside the body, one can cure themselves from a wide range of illnesses, including diabetes and cancer. In a 2022 ethnographic study published in Slovak Ethnology, Aneliya Manova noted that Dafa students believed that they were not susceptible to illnesses and had "extraordinary health". Rather than viewing their illnesses as a medical problem, adherents are encouraged by Li to refrain from medical treatment and instead regard the pain and suffering associated with illnesses as part of their spiritual cultivation, provided they recognized it as an opportunity to clear their karma. Manova noted that during the COVID-19 pandemic, interviewees maintained that it was not possible for genuine practitioners to contract viruses however made exceptions for those who were considered as insufficiently advanced in their cultivation. She identified these qualifications as strategies for reducing cognitive dissonance when reality had conflicted with practitioners' beliefs.

Elise Thomas of the Institute for Strategic Dialogue and Ming Xia of the Graduate Center of the City University of New York stated that Falun Gong has a history of rejecting modern medicine. The belief that following Falun Gong's teaching can prevent ailments instead of using medicine is common among the movement's practitioners. In an overview of Falun Gong, sociologist Richard Madsen pointed out that, like most qigong practices, Falun Gong's concept of healing aligns with Chinese traditions, which “assume a profound interpenetration of matter and spirit, body and soul”; therefore, health benefits are achieved through both physical exercises and moral cultivation.

In a 2003 ethnographic study, Noah Porter concluded that “[Falun Gong] practitioners are not encouraged to rely on Western medicine, but are not prohibited from using it. Child practitioners are not put at risk." He further observed that Falun Gong practitioners do not pressure other members not to seek medical treatment if they choose to do so. Columbia University China scholar James Seymour similarly remarked that "[Falun Gong] practitioners say that they are free to do what they want, and many do seek out doctors and hospitals." China scholar Hu Ping held that the criticism of Falun Gong as being anti-medical treatment is “not the truth”, citing Falun Gong texts "Can a hospital cure illness? Of course it can. . . It is only that their cures are carried out through normal methods." Hu noted that while some practitioners may interpret such teachings to an extreme and “forgo medical treatment in favor of exercise only," most practitioners do both.

In 2001, Schechter quotes a Falun Gong student who says "It is always an individual choice whether one should take medicine or not." However, in a Background Briefing program that year, ABC News quoted Li teaching that "Taking medication during cultivation implies that you do not believe in the disease-curing effect of cultivation." The program also quoted psychologist Margaret Singer's account of practitioners who had stopped taking medication and consulting physicians after joining Falun Gong.

In 2020, a joint ABC Background Briefing and Foreign Correspondent investigation quoted the Falun Dafa Association as describing medical treatment as a personal choice, while claiming that diseases could disappear when people took up the practise of Falun Gong and understood its universal principles. The investigation also reported families harmed by involvement with the movement and that its teachings on medicine may have contributed to premature deaths. One interviewee, Anna, said her mother opposed doctors prescribing medication because she believed taking it meant being a "bad practitioner" who did not fully trust Li's teachings. In 2026, ABC reported claims by Li that his teachings could heal adherents of serious illnesses.

James R. Lewis criticized claims that Falun Gong does not discourage practitioners from using modern medicine. He argued that an important distinction must be made between Li's teachings concerning "ordinary people" and those concerning practitioners. Li stated he was explaining "the relationship between practicing cultivation and medicine-taking", and that an "everyday person" (non-practitioner) needs to take medicine when sick, but held practitioners to a different standard. Although Li stated he would not forbid practitioners from taking medicine, he taught that those who regard themselves as practitioners must pass the "test" to become extraordinary in this regard. Li claimed that if one "goes ahead and take medicine", then they haven't passed this test and are merely another "everyday" person.

David Palmer similarly notes that Li taught that "true disciples" should not take medicine when ill. According to Li's teachings, medical treatment only changes the external manifestations of an illness while the underlying cause is beyond the reach of modern medicine. Illness is taught as being a means of repaying karmic debt and so should be allowed to run its natural course unless Li personally intervenes to cure the illness.

In interviews with current and former Falun Gong practitioners, many had claimed their illnesses were cured after they began practicing. However, there are no high quality studies proving the significant health benefits of Falun Gong. Psychiatrist Stephen Barrett, a former editor of Quackwatch, said that there was nothing inherently wrong with using Falun Gong exercises for relaxation, but expressed concern that such practises could instill "false beliefs". Barrett stated that such false beliefs could be "mentally dangerous" if they lead to bad decisions such as sick people refusing medical treatment because they believed Falun Gong teachings could cure them. He argued that Falun Gong enters the "realm of quackery" when it makes health claims that cannot be verified scientifically, including claims that it can cure cancer at a much higher rate than conventional medicine. Wanjek wrote that when stripped of its political context, the five exercises movements practised in Falun Gong may only result in "modest health benefits".

In Controversial New Religions, Helen Farley wrote that Falun Gong teaches that illnesses are a manifestation of "bad karma". She states that Falun Gong teaches that one of the ways to remove karma is through suffering in the form of illness and noted that according to "believers", medicine is regarded as counterproductive because it is believed to "keep negative karma trapped" in one's body.

During the COVID-19 pandemic, Li claimed that measures to handle the virus were misguided because pandemics were "arranged by gods" as an inevitable consequence of humanity's declining morality and served to help "purge" its "karmic debt".

== Communism ==
Opposing communism, particularly the Chinese communist party, is a central message spread in Falun Gong. During the Chinese government crackdown on Falun Gong in 1999, Li called on his followers to protest against the government and defend his cosmology. While Jiang Zemin was president of the People's Republic of China, Li had described Jiang as being the "highest representative of the evil force in the human world" that was manipulated by "higher forces" to suppress Falun Gong. According to David Ownby, Li begun to depict the suppression as part of a "final trial" and appeared to promise his followers that they will earn instant "consummation" or enlightenment, if they were to die as martyrs while forebearing for the cause.

Ownby also emphasized that Li was not in China during the crackdown and was well out of harm's way and yet was encouraging his followers to resist the Chinese government and to embrace martyrdom. Ownby wrote:

Li scorns those practitioners – even in China, where stakes of resistance are high – who lack the courage of their convictions, [and] seems to ask that his followers make sacrifices that he himself has not made”

As early as December 2000, Li posted a crucial message on the official Falun Gong website stating which stated:

When this test concludes, all bad people will be destroyed by gods. Those Dafa disciples who are able to come through the test will leave through Consummation. Those people who’ll be left behind will have to eradicate sins by paying with horrible suffering.

In 2001, Craig S. Smith, writing in The New York Times, described Li's increasingly strident messages to Falun Gong followers:

Meanwhile, Mr. Li's cryptic exhortations to followers on the Falun Gong Web site have grown increasingly strident, chastising those people who cannot endure torture or even death in defense of his cosmology, which holds that Falun Gong is engaged in a struggle with evil beings for the redemption or destruction of the universe.

A few years after the crackdown, at a large gathering in Montreal, Li congratulated the martyrs of Tiananmen Square who have "consummated their own majestic positions". Scholar Susan Palmer, who was present at the gathering, interpreted the statements as presenting those practitioners as martyrs who attained a posthumous spiritual status.

A meditative task called "sending forth righteous thoughts" is assigned to Falun Gong practitioners with the stated purpose to "clear away the evil dark minions and rotten demons" and eradicate the "Communist evil specter and all of the evil factors of the Communist Party in other dimensions". In practise, this task involves followers to recite two verses, that are written by Li, for approximately 5 to 10 minutes at 6 am, midday, 6 pm, and midnight (Beijing time). The verses also require it to be spoken in Chinese. Followers who do not speak Chinese are provided with a pronunciation guide to help them recite the verses correctly.

In 2024, an investigation from The New York Times reported that Li had taught that people can be saved from the "coming apocalypse" and "enter a new universe" if they both rejected the Chinese Communist Party and believe in the "goodness of Falun Gong".

== Dharma-ending period ==
According to Li, he founded Falun Gong to save humanity and describes the present times as being "in the final period of the Last Havoc". In his teachings, the Last Havoc is the final stage of the Dharma-ending period (Mo Fa, 末法), an era of moral degeneration culminating in the destruction of most of civilization. Li teaches that the fundamental Law of the universe, which he calls the Fa, enables salvation through Fa-rectification and adherence to the Fa.

Unlike some Western apocalypse groups that typically claims a predetermined inevitable date for an apocalypse, Li does not set a specific date for when the final phase would end. However, he claimed that moral values are declining daily and that humanity faces an impending destruction as society abandons moral standards. His teachings describe a cycle of civilizational destruction and renewal and instruct adherents on how to attain a higher spiritual level and be saved. Li claims that human civilization has been completely annihilated 81 times throughout history and that a small number of humans are left to start a subsequent civilization from the primitive level. He teaches that previous civilization were technologically advanced and that archaeological discoveries provide evidence of their existence. Rejecting the theory of evolution, he writes:

In the museum of the National University of Peru, there is a large rock on which a figure was engraved, holding a telescope observing celestial bodies. This figure is more than 30 000 years old … How could there be a telescope 30 000 years ago? There is an iron rod in India whose iron content reaches over 99 per cent. The use of modern smelting technology cannot even produce iron with such high purity as it already surpassed the level of modern technology. Who created that civilization? Human beings should have been micro-organisms at that time, so how was it possible to create these things?

Li teaches that a process he refers to as "Fa-rectification" (spreading the Dafa or Falun Gong teachings) can renew the universe, eliminate moral degeneration, and reorder all life. Li claims that his primary role is to carry out Fa-rectification and assign tasks to his practitioners. These tasks includes "Clarifying the Truth" (Jiang Zhen Xiang) and "Sending Righteous Thoughts" (Fa Zheng Nian). "Sending Righteous Thoughts" is a spiritual practice intended to counter forces that practitioners believe obstruct Fa-rectification while "Clarifying the Truth" involves changing people's negative views of Falun Gong and distributing literature and talking to people to counter the Chinese communist party's narrative of their movement. Adherents engage in these tasks to align themselves with the cosmic law, which they believe purifies their karma and helps save sentient beings.

In 2001, Raphael Aaron, director of Cult Counselling Australia, told ABC News that Falun Gong adherents believed their movement can "save the universe" and that this belief fostered a "strong elitist feeling" within the group. Aaron also noted that:

There's the view that this group is going to save the universe, and it's very clear in [Li's] writings, and that in fact if the universe is going to be saved, the only people that are going to actually survive are going to be people who actually follow Falun Gong.

According to Palmer, Li had taught that society embracing feminism, homosexuality, modern technology, race-mixing, and communism as well as society distancing itself from good morals as among the aggravating factors that can bring about the "end of the Dharma". Palmer writes Li presents himself as the only person in history to have revealed the fundamental Law of the universe, which Li teaches is the only means of protection from this apocalyptic fate.

Palmer notes that Li had claimed that orthodox religions of the past, such as Buddhism, have been abandoned by the gods and are no longer capable of bringing salvation to humanity. Instead, Li claims that only his teachings and the practice of Falun Gong can save humanity. According to Palmer, Li also claimed to have successfully prevented the destruction of the universe in 1997 and teaches that the last "remaining layer" needing salvation is humanity. Li had also later claimed that ten years of Fa-rectification or spreading the Dafa, had successfully averted a comet catastrophe, World War III, and what he refers to as "the peril in 1999" associated with the cycle of "formation-stasis-degeneration."

In a 2002 article in East Asian History, scholar Benjamin Penny discussed apocalyptic themes in Li's writings including the "last days" and the Dharma-ending period. Penny wrote:

In accordance with Li's writings, Nam apparently refers to this as the dharma-ending period. During this period - we are not told how long it will last - a "strange disease" will afflict mankind and "it is hard for even one out of ten households to survive." The sage will not teach for very long, and, importantly, "all religions at the time are no longer effective. The only way out is to attain the Fa quickly." ... Thus, in these last days, Falun Gong must be seen as the only path to salvation, supplanting existing religions.

A 2024 investigation by The New York Times noted that Li stated that Shen Yun was the "most important project" in his religion, and had urged adherents to try to persuade as many people as possible to attend its performance as he claimed it could spread Falun Gong's message and that audiences could be saved from a "coming apocalypse" by absorbing that message.

== Goal of cultivation ==
David Ownby writes that Li teaches that today's humans were originally "gods of some sort" but they lost their divine status through immoral behavior. However, through Falun Gong cultivation, practitioners can "redeem" themselves and return to their original divine status. Li teaches that the goal of cultivation, and thus life itself, is "spiritual elevation" in which is achieved by removing karma and accumulating virtue.

Likewise, Benjamin Penny argued that Consummation is a final goal where one "returns to the origin" and regain their status as Gods or Buddhas. Penny wrote that Li's teachings are clearly "intended" as a path to salvation where Li first diagnoses the current condition of humanity as being a fallen state and then gives his "prescription" through which practitioners can transcend and achieve their ultimate spiritual goal. Penny wrote that the goal of returning to "the origin", regaining status as Gods, Daos, or Buddhas, and attaining Consummation, are "all essentially amounting to the same thing".

Penny also notes that Li compares Consummation with the ultimate attainments of other religious traditions, including nirvana in Buddhism, "rainbow transformation" in Tibetan Buddhism, and "corpse-liberation" or "ascend[ing] in broad daylight" in Daoism. In this sense, Penny writes that Consummation is a reference to "the final goal of a righteous method of cultivation", regardless of the particular method.

However David Palmer noted that Li had taught that Orthodox religions such as Buddhism and Taoism have "long been in decline" and now only practise "external forms", and that such "external religious forms" are not being paid attention by the Gods and Buddhas and are "incapable of bringing salvation". Li had claimed that his Falun Gong teachings exclusively contains the true Dharma and is a path to Consummation.

Palmer quotes Li as having said:

Presently, I am the only one in the whole world who is teaching the orthodox Dharma (zhengfa). What I am doing has never been done before. I have opened a great gate in this period of the end of the Dharma. In fact, this doesn't happen once in a thousand or even ten thousand years... To become a Falun Gong disciple is an opportunity one shouldn't pass by. I say, time is running out ... I am not only saving humans. When you will have reached enlightenment, I will have other things to do, I won't be able to teach you anymore. I will not be transmitting the Dharma among humans for long.

== Controversies ==
Li Hongzhi's conservative moral teachings have caused some concern in the West, including his views on homosexuality, democracy and science.

In light of Li's teachings on homosexuality as immoral, a nomination of Li for the Nobel Peace Prize by San Francisco legislators was withdrawn in 2001. In discussing the portrayal of Falun Gong as "anti-gay", Ethan Gutmann stated in 2010 that Falun Gong's teachings are "essentially indistinguishable" from traditional religions such as Christianity, Islam, and Buddhism. According to a 2020 article published in the Journal of Religion and Violence by Xinzhang Zhang and James R. Lewis, scholars at Zhejiang University and Wuhan University, respectively, Li was aware of the backlash from Western audiences over his socially reactionary views and directed followers to avoid discussing such topics with outsiders. The authors described strategies used by practitioners in responding to criticism for Li's anti-progressive views, including whataboutism, in which they argue that other religious traditions similarly oppose homosexuality. However, the authors argued that Li's teachings on homosexuality were "more radical" than those of other religions, noting that Christian groups generally do not teach that God cannot tolerate the existence of gay people or that homosexuality is a "filthy, deviant state of mind". The authors stated that some experts say Li dropped references to some of his more controversial views after settling in the U.S. Maria Chang, a UC Berkeley political science professor, opined that, "since 1999 the Falun Gong in North America are trying to whitewash their past views and normalize the organization in the eyes of the public." The authors also noted that Li softened his attitude toward homosexuals in his more recent public presentations, for example, in a 2006 Q&A session.

Some journalists have also expressed concern over Falun Gong's teachings on the children of interracial marriages. Concern stems from a statement of Li's identifying such children as products of "a chaotic situation brought about by mankind" indicative of "the Dharma-ending period". Additionally, The Sydney Morning Herald reported that during his visit to Sydney, Australia in 1996, Li had described a mixed-race society as being an "extraordinarily serious problem".

There have been discussion over whether Falun Gong contains an apocalyptic message. Human Rights Watch stated there was "no question" that Falun Gong contained salvationist and apocalyptic ideas. Li Hongzhi had claimed that the world had been destroyed 81 times, with some humans surviving to restart civilization. He also taught that due to the moral degradation of society, another cycle of destruction would come for civilization. He claimed that society was living in the "last days of the Last Havoc" or "Dharma-ending period" (末法), described in Buddhist scriptures as an era of moral decline when the teachings of Buddhism would need to be renewed. Richard Gunde, assistant director of the Center for Chinese Studies at UCLA, argued that Falun Gong is unlike western cults that fixate on death and Armageddon, but merely promises its followers a long and healthy life. "Falun Gong has a simple, innocuous ethical message," Gunde says, "and its leader, Li Hongzhi, despite his unusual, if not bizarre, statements, is in many ways simple and low key."

Heather Kavan wrote that Li had explicitly instructed practitioners to refrain from telling "ordinary people" (non-practitioners) about his "higher level teachings" and to lie to those who do not share an interest in spiritual matters. Li tells them to instead just say they are "just doing exercises".

Falun Gong incorporates beliefs about extraterrestrials and prehistorical civilizations; these pseudoscientific beliefs had come to China from the West at the time that Falun Gong was developing. Li claimed that extraterrestrial entities are actively intervening in human affairs. Li claimed that aliens developed and introduced the technology used by humans today. Li has denounced modern technology as part of an alien plot to undermine morality, claiming that mechanical flight and electronic computers were given to humans by aliens.
