= The Religion of Falun Gong =

2012 book by Benjamin Penny

- First edition
- Author: Benjamin Penny
- Language: English
- Publisher: University of Chicago Press
- Publication date: 2012
- Pages: 262
- ISBN: 978-0-226-65501-7
- OCLC: 748290759
- Dewey Decimal: 299.5'1
- LC Class: BP605.F36P46 2012

The Religion of Falun Gong is a 2012 nonfiction book by Benjamin Penny, published by the University of Chicago Press, that discusses the Falun Gong's belief system.

The publisher stated that sources often did not include much analysis of Falun Gong beliefs but instead examined the group's political factors.

Penny's main argument is that Falun Gong functions as a religion even if the Chinese government, Li Hongzhi, and other people involved in Falun Gong do not publicly regard it as such.

== Reception ==
The book won the CHOICE Outstanding Academic Title Awards from Choice Magazine.

David Ownby of the Université de Montréal wrote that the book "convincingly illustrates the validity of treating Falun Gong as a religion" although Ownby noted this conclusion does not address the "quality" of the Falun Gong.

Paul Hedges of the University of Winchester wrote that the book "is an important contribution".

Gerda Wielander of the University of Westminster described the book as "A wonderful piece of Sinological research". She stated that the sourcing is "meticulous" but this sometimes results in the reading being "dry".

== See also ==
- Falun Gong and the Future of China
- Qigong Fever: Body, Science, and Utopia in China
- Becoming Activists in Global China
