= Salvation =

Concept in religion and theology

Salvation (from Latin: salvatio, from salva, 'safe, saved') is the state of being saved or protected from harm or a dire situation. In religion, salvation generally refers to the deliverance of the soul from a state of ignorance or perpetual harm. The academic study of salvation is called soteriology.

== Abrahamic religions ==
In Abrahamic religions and theology, salvation is the saving of the soul from sin and its consequences. It may also be called deliverance or redemption from sin and its effects. Depending on the religion or even denomination, salvation is considered to be caused either only by the grace of God (i.e. unmerited and unearned), or by faith, good deeds (works), or a combination thereof. Religions often emphasize that man is a sinner by nature and that the penalty of sin is death (physical death, spiritual death: spiritual separation from God and eternal punishment in hell).

=== Judaism ===
In contemporary Judaism, redemption (Hebrew: גְּאוּלָּה ge'ulah), refers to God redeeming the people of Israel from their various exiles. This includes the final redemption from the present exile.

Judaism holds that adherents do not need personal salvation (individual salvation) as Christians believe. Jews do not subscribe to the doctrine of original sin. Instead, they place a high value on individual morality as defined in the law of God—embodied in what Jews know as the Torah or The Law, given to Moses by God on biblical Mount Sinai.

In Judaism, salvation is closely related to the idea of redemption, a saving from the states or circumstances that destroy the value of human existence. God, as the universal spirit and Creator of the World, is the source of all salvation for humanity, provided that an individual honours God by observing His precepts. So redemption or salvation depends on the individual. Judaism stresses that salvation cannot be obtained through anyone else or by just invoking a deity or by believing in any outside power or influence.

The Jewish concept of Messiah visualises the return of the prophet Elijah as the harbinger of one who will redeem the world from war and suffering, leading mankind to universal brotherhood under the fatherhood of one God. The Messiah is not considered as a future divine or supernatural being but as a dominating human influence in an age of universal peace, characterised by the spiritual regeneration of humanity.

In Judaism, salvation is open to all people and not limited to those of the Jewish faith; the only important consideration being that the people must observe and practise the ethical pattern of behaviour as summarised in the Ten Commandments. When Jews refer to themselves as the chosen people of God, they do not imply they have been chosen for special favours and privileges but rather they have taken it upon themselves to show to all peoples by precept and example the ethical way of life.

Jewish intellectual sources throughout history clearly show a spectrum of opinions regarding death versus the afterlife. Possibly an over-simplification, one source says salvation can be achieved in the following manner: Live a holy and righteous life dedicated to Yahweh, the God of Creation. Fast, worship, and celebrate during the appropriate holidays.

By origin and nature, Judaism is an ethnic religion. Therefore, salvation has been primarily conceived in terms of the destiny of Israel as the elect people of Yahweh (often referred to as "the Lord"), the God of Israel.

The biblical text of Psalms includes a description of death when people go into the earth or the "realm of the dead" and cannot praise God. The first reference to resurrection is collective in Ezekiel's vision of the dry bones, when all the Israelites in exile will be resurrected. There is a reference to individual resurrection in the Book of Daniel. A belief in the afterlife, in which the dead would be resurrected and undergo divine judgment, is not recorded until after the Babylonian exile.

The salvation of the individual Jew was connected to the salvation of the entire people. This belief stemmed directly from the teachings of the Torah. In the Torah, God taught his people sanctification of the individual. However, he also expected them to function together (spiritually) and be accountable to one another. The concept of salvation was tied to that of restoration for Israel.

During the Second Temple Period, the Sadducees, High Priests, denied any particular existence of individuals after death because it wasn't written in the Torah, while the Pharisees, ancestors of the rabbis, affirmed both bodily resurrection and immortality of the soul, most likely based on the influence of Hellenistic ideas about body and soul and the Pharisaic belief in the Oral Torah. The Pharisees maintained that after death, the soul is connected to God until the messianic era when it is rejoined with the body in the land of Israel at the time of resurrection.

=== Christianity ===
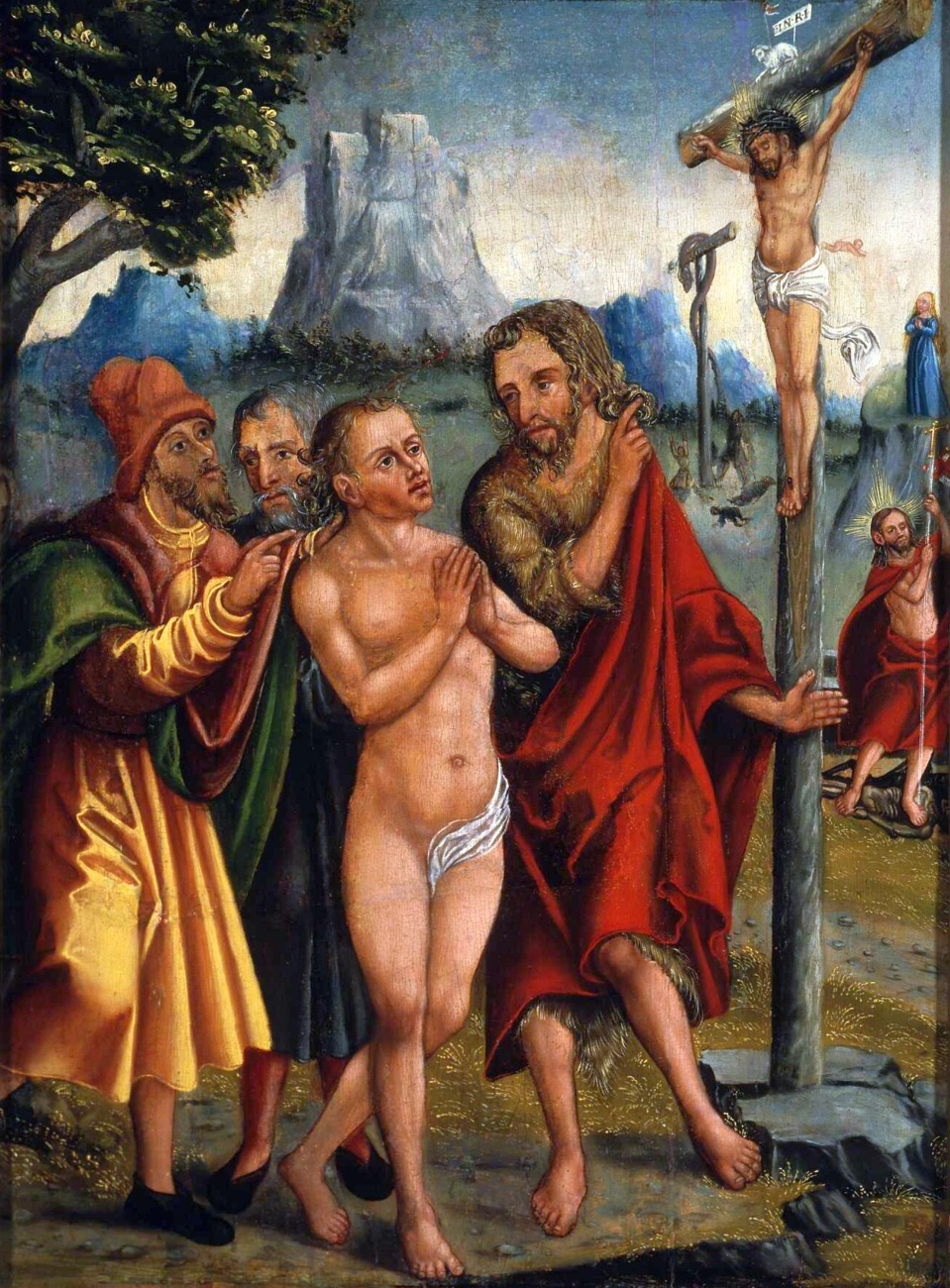
Allegory of Salvation by Antonius Heusler (c. 1555). National Museum, Warsaw.

Christianity's primary premise is that the incarnation and death of Jesus Christ formed the climax of a divine plan for humanity's salvation. This plan was conceived by God before the creation of the world, achieved at the cross, and it would be completed at the Last Judgment, when the Second Coming of Christ would mark the catastrophic end of the world and the creation of a new world.

For Christianity, salvation is only possible through Jesus Christ. Christians believe that Jesus' death on the cross was the once-for-all sacrifice that atoned for the sin of humanity.

The Christian religion, though not the exclusive possessor of the idea of redemption, has given to it a special definiteness and a dominant position. Taken in its widest sense, as deliverance from dangers and ills in general, most religions teach some form of it. It assumes an important position, however, only when the ills in question form part of a great system against which human power is helpless.

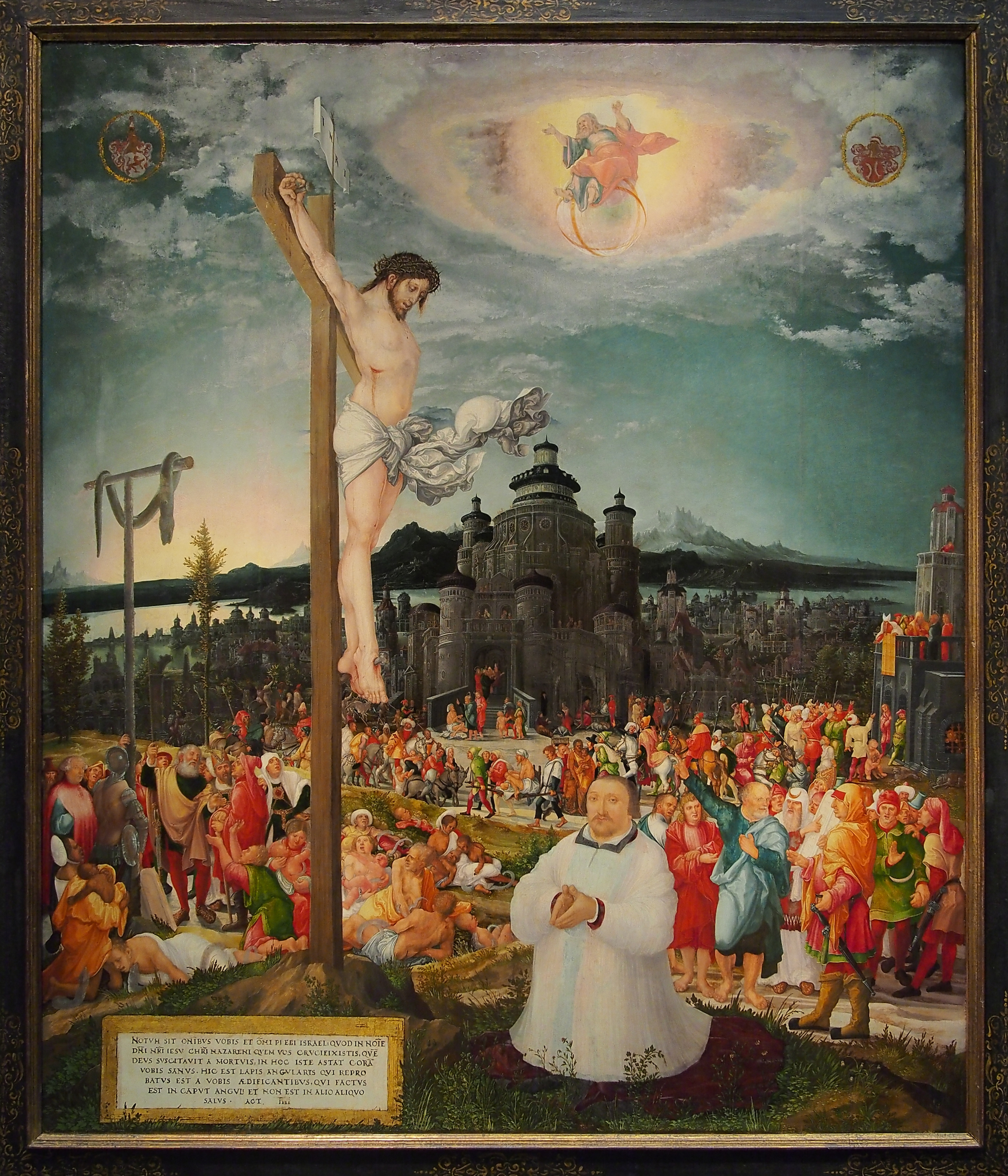
Allegory of Salvation by Wolf Huber (c. 1543). Kunsthistorisches Museum, Vienna

According to Christian belief, sin as the human predicament is considered to be universal. For example, in Romans 1:18–3:20 the Apostle Paul declared everyone to be under sin—Jew and Gentile alike. Salvation is made possible by the life, death, and resurrection of Jesus, which in the context of salvation is referred to as the "atonement". Christian soteriology ranges from exclusive salvation to universal reconciliation concepts. While some of the differences are as widespread as Christianity itself, the overwhelming majority agree that salvation is made possible by the work of Jesus Christ, the Son of God, dying on the cross.

At the heart of Christian faith is the reality and hope of salvation in Jesus Christ. Christian faith is faith in the God of salvation revealed in Jesus of Nazareth. The Christian tradition has always equated this salvation with the transcendent, eschatological fulfillment of human existence in a life freed from sin, finitude, and mortality and united with the triune God. This is perhaps the non-negotiable item of Christian faith. What has been a matter of debate is the relation between salvation and our activities in the world.

— Anselm Kyongsuk Min, Dialectic of Salvation: Issues in Theology of Liberation (2009)

The Bible presents salvation in the form of a story that describes the outworking of God's eternal plan to deal with the problem of human sin. The story is set against the background of the history of God's people and reaches its climax in the person and work of Christ. The Old Testament part of the story shows that people are sinners by nature, and describes a series of covenants by which God sets people free and makes promises to them. His plan includes the promise of blessing for all nations through Abraham and the redemption of Israel from every form of bondage. God showed his saving power throughout Israel's history, but he also spoke about a Messianic figure who would save all people from the power, guilt, and penalty of sin. This role was fulfilled by Jesus, who will ultimately destroy all the devil's work, including suffering, pain, and death.

— Macmillan Dictionary of the Bible.

Variant views on salvation are among the main fault lines dividing the various Christian denominations: Roman Catholicism, Eastern Orthodoxy, and Protestantism. A few examples are found within Protestantism, notably in the Calvinist–Arminian debate, and between Roman Catholicism and Protestantism, notably when dealing with sola fide during the Protestant Reformation. The fault lines can include conflicting definitions of depravity, predestination, atonement, but most pointedly justification.

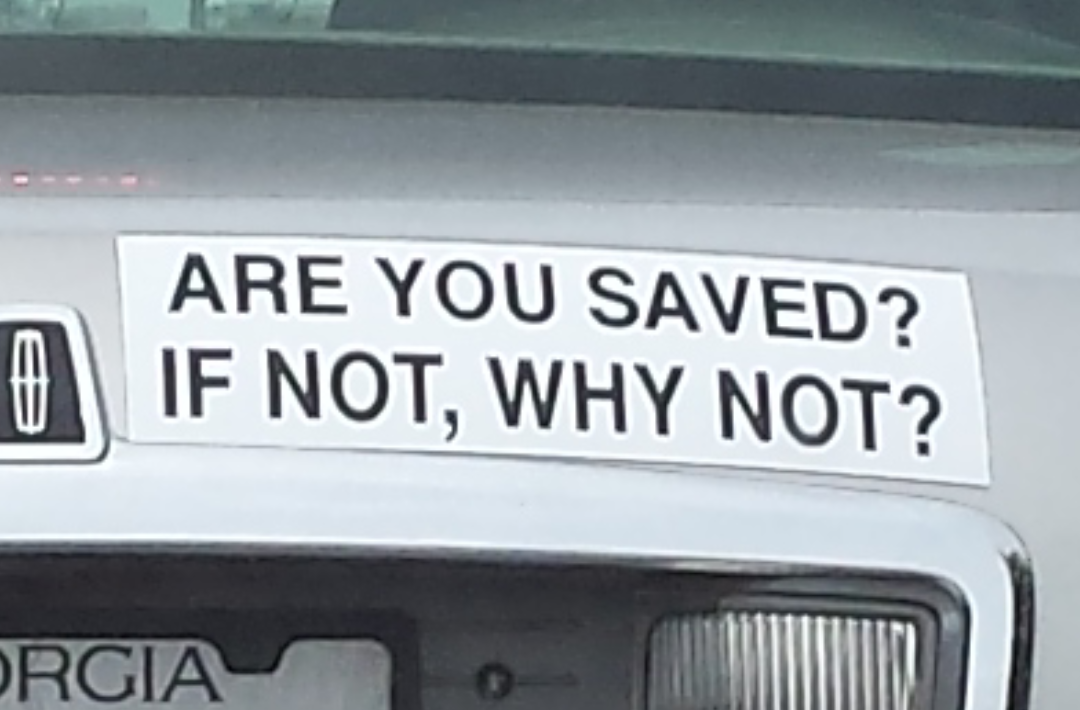
A bumper sticker

Salvation, according to most denominations, is believed to be a process that begins when a person first becomes a Christian, continues through that person's life, and is completed when they stand before Christ in judgment. Therefore, according to Catholic apologist James Akin, the faithful Christian can say in faith and hope, "I have been saved; I am being saved; and I will be saved."

Christian salvation concepts are varied and complicated by certain theological concepts, traditional beliefs, and dogmas. Scripture is subject to individual and ecclesiastical interpretations. While some of the differences are as widespread as Christianity itself, the overwhelming majority agrees that salvation is made possible by the work of Jesus Christ, the Son of God, dying on the cross.

The purpose of salvation is debated, but in general most Christian theologians agree that God devised and implemented his plan of salvation because he loves them and regards human beings as his children. Since human existence on Earth is said to be "given to sin," salvation also has connotations that deal with the liberation of human beings from sin, and the sufferings associated with the punishment of sin—i.e., "the wages of sin are death."

Christians believe that salvation depends on the grace of God. Stagg writes that a fact assumed throughout the Bible is that humanity is in, "serious trouble from which we need deliverance…. The fact of sin as the human predicament is implied in the mission of Jesus, and it is explicitly affirmed in that connection." By its nature, salvation must answer to the plight of humankind as it actually is. Each individual's plight as a sinner is the result of a fatal choice involving the whole person in bondage, guilt, estrangement, and death. Therefore, salvation must be concerned with the total person. "It must offer redemption from bondage, forgiveness for guilt, reconciliation for estrangement, renewal for the marred image of God."

=== Islam ===
In Islam, salvation refers to the eventual entrance to Paradise. Islam teaches that only those who die believing in the one God in Islam receive salvation. Belief in the "One God", also known as the Tawhid (التَوْحيدْ) in Arabic, consists of two parts (or principles):

1. Tawḥīdu r-Rubūbiyya (Arabic: تَوْحيدُ الرُبوبِيَّة): Believing in the attributes of God and attributing them to no other but God. Such attributes include Creation, having no beginning, and having no end. These attributes are what make a God. Islam also teaches no less than 99 names for God, and each of these names defines one attribute. One breaks this principle, for example, by believing in an Idol as an intercessor to God. The idol, in this case, is thought of having powers that only God should have, thereby breaking this part of Tawheed. No intercession is required to communicate with, or worship, God.
2. Tawḥīdu l-'ulūhiyya (Arabic: تَوْحيدُ الأُلوهيَّة) : Directing worship, prayer, or deed to God, and God only. For example, worshiping an idol or any saint or prophet is also considered Shirk.

Islam is built on five principles, acts of worship that Islam teaches to be mandatory. Not performing the mandatory acts of worship may deprive Muslims of the chance of salvation. According to Ibn 'Umar, Muhammad said that Islam is based on the following five principles:

1. To testify that none has the right to be worshipped but Allah and Muhammad is Allah's Messenger.
2. To offer the compulsory prayers dutifully and perfectly.
3. To pay Zakat to poor and needy (i.e. obligatory charity of 2.5% annually of surplus wealth).
4. To perform Hajj (i.e. pilgrimage to Mecca).
5. To observe fast during the month of Ramadhan.

Islam also stresses that in order to gain salvation, one must avoid sin and perform good deeds. Islam acknowledges the inclination of humanity towards sin. Therefore, Muslims are constantly commanded to seek God's forgiveness and repent. Islam teaches that no one can gain salvation simply by virtue of their belief or deeds but by the mercy of God. However, repentance must not be used to sin any further. Islam teaches that God is merciful.

Allah only accepts the repentance of those who commit evil ignorantly or recklessly then repent soon after—Allah will pardon them. And Allah is All-Knowing, All-Wise.

— Surah An-Nisa 4:17

Indeed, Allah does not forgive associating others with Him ˹in worship˺, but forgives anything else of whoever He wills. And whoever associates others with Allah has indeed committed a grave sin.

— Surah An-Nisa 4:48

Islam describes a true believer to have Love of God and Fear of God. Islam also teaches that every person is responsible for their own sins. The Quran states:

If you disbelieve, then ˹know that˺ Allah is truly not in need of you, nor does He approve of disbelief from His servants. But if you become grateful ˹through faith˺, He will appreciate that from you. No soul burdened with sin will bear the burden of another. Then to your Lord is your return, and He will inform you of what you used to do. He certainly knows best what is ˹hidden˺ in the heart.

— Surah Az-Zumar 39:7

Al-Agharr al-Muzani who was from amongst the companions of Muhammad reported that Ibn 'Umar stated to him that Allah's Messenger said:

O people, seek repentance from Allah. Verily, I seek repentance from Him a hundred times a day.

— Sahih Muslim 2702b

Sin in Islam is an action (a bad deed), not a state; Islam teaches that a child is born sinless, regardless of the belief of their parents, dies a Muslim, and enters heaven, and does not enter hell.

Narrated `Aisha: The Prophet said, "Do good deeds properly, sincerely and moderately, and receive good news because one's good deeds will not make him enter Paradise." They asked, "Even you, O Allah's Messenger?" He said, "Even I, unless and until Allah bestows His pardon and Mercy on me."

— Sahih al-Bukhari 6467

=== Latter-Day Saints ===
According to doctrine of the Church of Jesus Christ of Latter-day Saints, the plan of salvation is God's plan to save, redeem, and exalt all humankind who chose, either in this life, or in the world of spirits of the dead, to accept the grace of Jesus Christ by faith in him, repenting of their sins, and by making and keeping sacred covenants (including baptism). Since most people die without doing these things, the LDS preaches to them that if they accept Christ, sincerely repent of their sins, and accept ordinances done on their behalf, they can receive salvation on the same terms as the living. Members of the Church of Jesus Christ of Latter-day Saints do vicarious work for the dead in sacred temples, drawing from various sources, including the Bible, Book of Mormon, Doctrine & Covenants, Pearl of Great Price, and statements by LDS leaders.

== Indian religions ==
Hinduism, Buddhism, Jainism and Sikhism share certain key concepts, which are interpreted differently by different groups and individuals. In these religions one is not liberated from sin and its consequences, but from the saṃsāra (cycle of rebirth) perpetuated by passions and delusions and its resulting karma. They differ however on the exact nature of this liberation.

Salvation is always self-attained in Indian religions, and a more appropriate term would be moksha ('liberation') or mukti ('release'). This state and the conditions considered necessary for its realization is described in early texts of Indian religion such as the Upanishads and the Pāli Canon, and later texts such the Yoga Sutras of Patanjali and the Vedanta tradition. Moksha can be attained by sādhanā, literally 'means of accomplishing something'. It includes a variety of disciplines, such as yoga and dhyana (meditation).

Nirvana is the profound peace of mind that is acquired with moksha. In Buddhism and Jainism, it is the state of being free from suffering. In Hindu philosophy, it is union with the Brahman (Supreme Being). The word literally means 'blown out' (as in a candle) and refers, in the Buddhist context, to the blowing out of the fires of desire, aversion, and delusion, and the imperturbable stillness of mind acquired thereafter.

In Theravada Buddhism the emphasis is on one's own liberation from samsara. The Mahayana traditions emphasize the bodhisattva path, in which "each Buddha and Bodhisattva is a redeemer," assisting the Buddhist in seeking to achieve the redemptive state. The assistance rendered is a form of self-sacrifice on the part of the teachers, who would presumably be able to achieve total detachment from worldly concerns, but have instead chosen to remain engaged in the material world to the degree that this is necessary to assist others in achieving such detachment.

=== Jainism ===
In Jainism, salvation, moksha, and nirvana are one and the same. When a soul (atman) achieves moksha, it is released from the cycle of births and deaths, and achieves its pure self. It then becomes a siddha ('one who has accomplished his ultimate objective'). Attaining Moksha requires annihilation of all karmas, good and bad, because if karma is left, it must bear fruit.

== Chinese religions ==
Chinese salvationist religions or Chinese folk religious sects are a Chinese religious tradition characterised by a concern for salvation (moral fulfillment) of the person and the society. They are distinguished by egalitarianism, a founding charismatic person often informed by a divine revelation, a specific theology written in holy texts, a millenarian eschatology and a voluntary path of salvation, an embodied experience of the numinous through healing and self-cultivation, and an expansive orientation through evangelism and philanthropy.

Some scholars consider these religions a single phenomenon, and others consider them the fourth great Chinese religious category alongside the well-established Confucianism, Buddhism and Taoism. Some of these religions focus on the worship of the universal God (Shangdi) and regard their holy patriarchs as embodiments of God.

=== Taoism ===
While early Taoism had no understanding of the concept of salvation, later in Taoist history, salvation became a major part of beliefs about it. Things one could do to be saved was to pray, offer sacrifices, and/or become a xian (Chinese: 仙; pinyin: Xiān) immortal.

=== Chinese new religious movements ===
==== Eastern Lightning ====
Established in China in 1991, Eastern Lightning (also known as Church of Almighty God) is a new religious movement known for promoting doomsday theories and whose stated objectives includes the destruction of the Chinese Communist Party, which it refer to as the "great red dragon". The movement teaches that Jesus "only partially completed the work of salvation" and that Christ has returned in the form of a Chinese woman. It characterizes the conflict between the "righteous" and the Chinese government as an "apocalyptic struggle" and considers resistance to the Communist Party as one of the "key tests of fitness for salvation". According to Christian Research Institute, Eastern Lightning also rejects the unique deity of Jesus and claims that it is up to a female Christ to complete the work that Jesus was unable to finish.

==== Falun Gong ====
Human Rights Watch asserts that there is no doubt that the new religious movement Falun Gong incorporates salvationist ideas in its teachings. Scholar Benjamin Penny noted that Li Hongzhi, Falun Gong's leader, had claimed to be the only person in the world to be publicly transmitting the "Orthodox Law", an opportunity that only occurs every 1,000 or 10,000 years. Penny writes that Li presents himself as the sole transmitter of teachings that can offer salvation. Penny explains that, in Li's usage, salvation refers to "escaping the cataclysms" that occurs at the end of the "kalpa" (cosmic cycle) and "entering the next age". Li had taught that humanity is currently living in the "last days of Last Havoc" and that he chose this time to make Falun Gong's teachings public. In 2024, The New York Times reported that Li taught that people can be saved from the "coming apocalypse" and "enter a new universe" if they both rejected the Chinese Communist Party and believe in the "goodness of Falun Gong".

== See also ==
- Antinomianism
- Assurance (theology)
- Born again
- Collective salvation
- Divine filiation
- Divine illumination
- Easter
- Gnosis
- Henosis
- Legalism (theology)
- Penance
- Perseverance of the saints
- Prevenient grace
- Regeneration (theology)
- Steps to Christ

== General and cited references ==
- Braden, Charles Samuel (1941). Man's Quest for Salvation: An Historical and Comparative Study of the Idea of Salvation in the World's Great Living Religions. Chicago & New York: Willett, Clark & Company.
- Brandon, S. G. F., ed. (1963). The Saviour God: Comparative studies in the concept of salvation presented to Edwin Oliver James by colleagues and friends. New York: Barnes & Noble.
- Brueggemann, Walter (30 September 2002). "Salvation". Reverberations of Faith: A Theological Handbook of Old Testament Themes. Louisville, Kentucky: Westminster John Knox Press. pp. 184–186. ISBN 9780664222314. (Presentation)
- Sharpe, Eric J.; Hinnells, John R., eds. (1973). Man and his salvation: Studies in memory of S. G. F. Brandon. Manchester: Manchester University Press. ISBN 0-7190-0537-X.
- Sherma, Rita D.; Sarma, Aravinda (2008), Hermeneutics and Hindu Thought: Toward a Fusion of Horizons, Springer
- Snelling, John (1987), The Buddhist handbook. A Complete Guide to Buddhist Teaching and Practice, London: Century Paperbacks
- Tiwari, K.N. (1983), Comparative Religion, Motilal Banarsidass
- Kumar, Santosh (2019), Salvation: In the Light of the Cross and the Crescent, Notion Press, ISBN 9781647604974
