= Becoming Activists in Global China =

Book by Andrew Junker

Becoming Activists in Global China: Social Movements in the Chinese Diaspora
- Author: Andrew Junker
- Language: English
- Subject: Social Science, Sociology, Religion, Political Science, Political Advocacy
- Genre: History
- Published: 2019 (Cambridge University Press)
- Publication place: United States
- Pages: 220 pages
- ISBN: 9781108482998

Becoming Activists in Global China: Social Movements in the Chinese Diaspora is a non-fiction book by Andrew Junker, an adjunct assistant professor in sociology at the Chinese University of Hong Kong. Published by Cambridge University Press in 2019, the book is a sociological study of the Falun Gong movement and the post-1989 democracy movement (Minyun), both suppressed in China. By comparing these two movements from a social movement perspective, Junker argued that Falun Gong's more enduring mobilization results from its decentralized organizational structure and demonstrates the potential for progressive social change.

== Background ==
Junker holds a Ph.D. in sociology from Yale University and is the Hong Kong Director of the Yale-China Association. He also has academic degrees in religious studies and East Asian studies. His papers have been published in Mobilization, Sociology of Religion, and the American Journal of Cultural Sociology.

The book is based on Junker's research of Falun Gong and the democracy movement through interviews and observations in the United States, Japan, Taiwan, and Hong Kong, conducting field visits from 2006 through 2015 and analyzing materials from archives and organizational publications. He employed quantitative narrative analysis to dissect the information collected.

== Content ==
Junker's comparative analysis highlights how Falun Gong and Minyun navigated and resisted the Chinese Communist Party (CCP) from within the global Chinese diaspora. He frames Falun Gong not just as a religious movement but also as a social movement. It is the first purely sociological study of Falun Gong's resilience.

Drawing on academic research, Junker identified similarities between the two movements, such as their reliance on digital media and transnational activities. He found that Falun Gong, in contrast to Minyun, succeeded by adopting "a diffuse, decentralized, and bottom-up approach motivated by Falun Gong's religious ethic of activism" in terms of participants, protests, progressive potential, and global political impact.

Junker observed that Minyun activism adhered to established Chinese norms of authority, with protests enacted as confrontations between counter-elites and authorities. In contrast, Falun Gong's activism broke with tradition through "its grassroots-based, diffuse nonviolent protest campaigns" to leverage public opinion and resources to pressure authorities.

Junker argued Falun Gong's activism contributes to progressive social change. Regardless of the ideology, the protest mobilization to defend freedom of religion has a "progressive character" central to liberal democratic modernity. Its grassroots activism was "so decentralized and emphasized individual initiative" with a spillover effect on the Chinese dissidents and diaspora community.

Junker also described The Epoch Times - a far-right newspaper associated with Falun Gong, as playing a "progressive role" simply by "increasing the plurality of voices in the diaspora Chinese-language public sphere." He noted, however, that the publication's influence was limited by the Falun Gong community's “pariah status”.

== Reception ==
The book is recognized for its theoretical contributions and ability to bridge the study of new religious movements with broader sociopolitical analysis. It is considered essential reading for scholars interested in the Chinese diaspora, social movements, and the intersection of religion and politics in contemporary China.

Chengpang Lee from the National University of Singapore criticized Junker's claims that Falun Gong has seen a reduction in politicization since 2000, and noted that Junker did not fully discuss the fact that Falun Gong published the "Nine Commentaries on the CCP" in 2004 and subsequently launched a campaign encouraging people to withdraw from CCP membership. Lee also argued that Junker did not fully address the role of Li Hongzhi's leadership in the movement, and their usage of traditional Chinese cultural elements such as symbols of the Tang dynasty.

In 2020, the book won the Honorable Mention for the Asia/Transnational Book Award by the American Sociological Association's Asia and Asian America Section.

== See also ==
- The Religion of Falun Gong
- Falun Gong and the Future of China
- Qigong Fever: Body, Science, and Utopia in China
