= Falun Gong and the Future of China =

2008 book by David Ownby

- Cover
- Author: David Ownby
- Language: English
- Subject: Falun Gong
- Publisher: Oxford University Press
- Publication date: 2008
- Pages: 312
- ISBN: 978-0-19-532905-6
- OCLC: 619082174
- Dewey Decimal: 299.5'1
- LC Class: BP605.F36O96 2008

Falun Gong and the Future of China is a 2008 book by David Ownby, published by Oxford University Press. The book is about the Chinese new religious movement Falun Gong, and covers its history and the group's media and portrayals of itself. The book received generally positive reviews.

== Background ==
David Ownby had conducted field work among people within North America who were a part of the Falun Gong movement.

== Contents ==
The initial portion of the book discusses the group's history. The book also discusses the general qigong fever from which the Falun Gong originated, as well as how the movement portrays itself in media like the Epoch Times, and anti-Falun Gong media created by the Chinese government.

Joseph Kahn of The New York Times wrote that Ownby did not have access to Chinese government officials, nor secret Chinese government documents; additionally Ownby did not have access to Falun Gong founder Li Hongzhi.

Ownby stated that the work is not in favor of Falun Gong nor is it meant to attack the Falun Gong. Hong You of Chicago wrote in The Journal of Religion that "Ownby's take in this study, if not harshly critical of Li, is not laudatory either".

== Reception ==
Hong You stated that the book is "an objective appraisal". According to Hong You the average public and academics in Chinese and religious studies would appreciate the book. He also believed that Falun Gong members would appreciate the book and find ways to restructure the movement through "constructive criticism coming from an academic work." You argued that despite the title, the work does not talk much about the future of China, making this "My only criticism".

Kahn wrote "his narrative does not offer many new insights into the fears and aspirations of either side" and that "His contention that Falun Gong belongs to a tradition dating to White Lotus is credible."

Scott Pacey of the Australian National University described the book as "a comprehensive overview of Falun Gong both as a set of religious beliefs and as an organized group of devotees." Michael L. Mickler of the Unification Theological Seminary wrote "Despite its title, the book deals very little, if at all, with the future of China." Pacey stated "Scholars and students interested in Chinese religion will find much to profit from this book."

Mickler stated that academics with modern Chinese history and/or new religions will have "particular interest" in the work although it is also "accessible" to the lay public. Mickler stated that the work "is a major contribution toward our understanding of" the Falun Gong.

James R. Lewis argued in his 2018 book Falun Gong: Spiritual Warfare and Martyrdom that Ownby's book was too sympathetic to the Falun Gong, and was unfairly biased against the People's Republic of China and too willing to accept information sourced from the group's websites. Lewis said the book's account of the persecution of the Falun Gong was "incomplete and thus misleading" and that Ownby accepted arguments from other organizations without realizing that they were not truly independent of the organization. He said that while he appreciated the book there needed to be room for less apologetic treatments of the movement.

== See also ==
- The Religion of Falun Gong
- Qigong Fever: Body, Science, and Utopia in China
- Becoming Activists in Global China
