= Collective salvation =

Religious belief

Collective salvation is the religious belief that members of a group collectively influence the salvation of the group to which they belong. Collective salvation can teach that the group is collectively one person by its nature. The concept of collective salvation appears at times in Christianity, Islam, and Judaism.

In Judaism, traditional Jewish theology predicted that the Jewish Messiah would bring collective salvation for the Jews. The Book of Daniel specifies both collective forgiveness for the Jews and individual judgment of unrighteous people.

In the context of early Christianity, Cyprian promoted this idea in the 3rd century, before the 313 Edict of Milan, at a time when most Christians were persecuted and lived outside of society. Augustine of Hippo (354-430) also discussed this topic in his early-5th century book, The City of God, noting that some taught that the entire Catholic Church would be saved. At that time many taught that 1 Corinthians 12:12–14 which describes Christians as "one body" implied collective salvation. Augustine rejected the concept, maintaining that people who live immoral lives can never be saved, even if they partake of the Eucharist.

Early proponents of Christian monasticism often rejected the idea of collective salvation. The Desert Fathers of Egypt in the 4th century advocated withdrawal from society to focus on individual salvation through individual isolation and prayer. However, in the Middle Ages monastic movements often gave more attention to the idea of the salvation of others, and devoted much of their time to collective prayer and to prayer for the dead.

Scholars such as Hans Conzelmann have argued that the concept appears in the Christian scriptures, such as in the Gospel of Luke. Colonial Yankees represented a public Protestantism that emphasized collective salvation.

Some Muslim movements have also emphasized collective salvation, believing that the Quran speaks of both individual and collective salvation. Many Turkish writers have depicted an ideal transformation of society into an ideal Islamic culture. The Iranian intellectual Ali Shariati (1933-1977) taught that Muslim societies could find collective salvation through revolutionary political movements. He believed that much of institutionalized Islam needed to be transformed into a revolutionary ideology.

The theology of collective salvation has often been linked with Millennialism, a belief which forecasts an imminent transition to freedom from human suffering and oppression. Proponents of Millennialist views often teach that Divine power will soon grant collective salvation to a certain group. Some Millennialist groups foresee an earthly collective salvation, while others believe that salvation will only be granted in Heaven. Many 19th-century American adherents of Postmillennialism believed that evangelism and charitable deeds could bring about collective salvation on earth. Those who believe in Millennialist collective salvation often teach that both a supernatural gift and a human role play a part in that salvation. Some maintain that the transition will come about as the result of a sudden catastrophe (sometimes called an "apocalypse"), while others believe that human progress will progressively lead to such a state.

== See also ==
- Corporate election
- Treasury of merit - a Catholic system of collectively aiding in the salvation of others
