= Supernatural gift =

In Christian theology, a supernatural gift is a gift of God that is conferred on man that is above all the powers of created nature. An example of this is the gift of grace, which enables man to attain salvation despite original sin.

Roman Catholic writer Thomas Bartholomew Scannell refers to gifts which are "absolutely supernatural", meaning those "beyond the reach of all created nature (even of the angels)", and others which are "only relatively supernatural" or "preternatural", meaning that they are "above human nature only and elevate human nature to that state of higher perfection which is natural to the angels".

Pope Paul VI, in his encyclical letter Ecclesiam Suam refers to two supernatural gifts, truth and grace, seeing Jesus' teaching technique as recorded in the gospels as a preparation for the receipt of these supernatural gifts, an approach which he described as "consistent with the dignity of the human person".

== See also ==
- Spiritual gift
