= David Ownby =

American-Canadian historian of Chinese religion

- Occupation: Historian

Academic background
- Education: Harvard University

Academic work
- Discipline: Chinese history; history of religion; intellectual life in contemporary china
- Institutions: Université de Montréal; Max Planck Institute for Social Anthropology
- Notable works: Falun Gong and the Future of China; Brotherhoods and Secret Societies in Early and Mid‑Qing China
- Website: www.readingthechinadream.com

David Ownby (born 1958) is an American‑Canadian historian of Chinese religion and a specialist in modern Chinese popular movements. He is professor emeritus of history at the Université de Montréal and research associate at the Max Planck Institute for Social Anthropology. Ownby's scholarship has contributed to Western understanding of Qing‑period secret societies, Falun Gong and contemporary Chinese intellectual landscape.

== Early life and education ==
Ownby is a native of the United States. He earned his B.A. in history from Vanderbilt University and his master's degree in East Asian Studies and a Ph.D. in History and East Asian Languages from Harvard University.

== Academic career ==
Ownby taught at University of Montreal from 1994 until his retirement in July 2023, as a professor of the Center of East Asian Studies and the history department. He then became a research associate at the Max Planck Institute for Social Anthropology in Halle, Germany. In addition to traditional scholarship, Ownby maintains the translation website ‘‘Reading the China Dream’’, launched in 2018 to make the work of contemporary Chinese public intellectuals available in English.

His research centers on the history of religion in modern and contemporary China. He conducts fieldwork on popular religious groups in China, Taiwan and North America, analyzing their development in relation to state policy, institutional religion and the post‑Mao religious revival. He also co‑leads an SSHRC Insight‑funded project on contemporary Chinese intellectual life, which examines how increased intellectual freedom, the search for a modern yet distinctly Chinese identity and the government’s pursuit of new ideological legitimacy intersect.

== Research ==
=== Secret societies and popular religion ===
Ownby’s early work examined Qing‑period secret societies. His monograph Brotherhoods and Secret Societies in Early and Mid‑Qing China (1996) argues that these organizations were founded as popular "brotherhood association" to foster "mutual aid" and "community cohesion" rather than political upheavals, and that the Qing dynasty's harsh repression inadvertently accelerated the Tiandihui’s expansion and consolidation throughout southern China.

=== Falun Gong ===
Beginning in the late 1990s, Ownby turned to Falun Gong. His fieldwork in North America and textual analysis culminated in Falun Gong and the Future of China, the first academic monograph to contextualize the movement historically and sociologically.

Scott Pacey of the Australian National University described the book as "a comprehensive overview of Falun Gong both as a set of religious beliefs and as an organized group of devotees." Pacey stated "Scholars and students interested in Chinese religion will find much to profit from this book." Hong You, a scholar of contemporary Chinese religion, considered Ownby's treatment "an objective appraisal". According to Hong You the average public and academics in Chinese and religious studies would appreciate the book, so would Falun Gong members as it contains "constructive criticism coming from an academic work." Michael L. Mickler, an American church historian, described it as "a major contribution toward our understanding of" the Falun Gong. Both Hong You and Mickler pointed that the book deals little with the "Future of China" despite its title. James R. Lewis, a scholar of new religious movement and professor at Wuhan University, argued that Ownby's book was too sympathetic to the Falun Gong, and was unfairly biased against the People's Republic of China.

=== Contemporary Chinese intellectual life ===
Since 2018, Ownby's work has focused on translating writings by Chinese Liberal, New Left and New Confucian thinkers. The project led to public presentation at the Collège de France in 2022 and their publication as L’essor de la Chine et les intellectuels publics chinois (2023).

Ownby contends that Western views of Chinese intellectuals are too reductive in their use of a dissidents versus propagandist binary; according to Ownby, the West largely ignores the variety of Chinese intellectuals actively engaged in debates about their country.

== Selected works ==
- Ownby, David (1996). "Brotherhoods and Secret Societies in Early and Mid‑Qing China". Stanford University Press.
- Ownby, David (2008), Falun Gong and the Future of China, Oxford University PressNew York, ISBN 0-19-532905-8
- Xu, Jilin; Ownby, David (2020). Rethinking China's rise: a liberal critique. The Cambridge China library (1st ed.). Cambridge: Cambridge University Press. ISBN 9781108470759.
- Ownby, David (2023). L'essor de la Chine et les intellectuels publics chinois. Conférences. Paris: Collège de France éditions. ISBN 978-2-7226-0620-3.
