= Qigong Fever: Body, Science, and Utopia in China =

2007 book by David A. Palmer

- Author: David A. Palmer
- Publisher: Hurst
- Publication date: 2007
- Pages: 356
- ISBN: 9781850658412

Qigong Fever: Body, Science, and Utopia in China is a 2007 book by David A. Palmer, published by Columbia University Press. It is about the "Qigong fever" in the late 20th century in China.

Patricia M. Thornton of the University of Oxford described it as "the first serious English-language history" of that topic.

== Background ==
David Palmer studied at the Ecole des Hautes Etudes en Sciences Sociales and published a French language thesis, Fièvre du qigong, in 2005. He adapted it into this book, which was published in English. Georges Favraud described the final book as "condensed" in the American style relative to the thesis but that Palmer "steps back to clarify and extend his earlier arguments."

== Contents ==
Benjamin Penny wrote that the book is "Broadly chronological in structure".

The first chapter shows the rise of qigong in China in the period 1949–1964. The second describes how Qigong regained prominence after 1978. The role of "grandmasters" in the qigong movement is chronicled in the third chapter. The political role in "qigong fever" is covered in those second and third chapters. The fourth chapter shows the technological dimension of "qigong fever".

The fifth describes how qigong, during the "qigong fever" period, incorporated elements of Chinese culture. The fifth chapter includes information on Yan Xin, Zhang Hongbao, and Zhang Xianyu. Chee-Han Lim of the Australian National University states that the chapter had a "broad picture of the qigong movement" but that "Unfortunately[...]Palmer does not really manage to capture the "feverishness"" as he did not have enough room in the book.

The sixth describes how the qigong movement responded to people criticizing it, and how the Chinese central government made efforts to manage the qigong movements. The Zhong Gong and Zangmi Gong, along with commercialization and the structures of qigong groups in general, are described in the seventh. Falun Gong is described in the eight and ninth. The tenth contextualizes modern gigong with the history of belief in China. The tenth includes some hypotheses.

== Reception ==
Lim wrote that the book "is an excellent addition" to its field, and he added that chapters 1 and 2 "are a must-read" for people learning about qigong for the first time.

Favraud praised the book for "original and profound insights".

Thornton described it as an "excellent volume".

Penny wrote that "Qigong Fever should be required reading for students of China’s modern cultural scene" because the work reveals the genesis of the Falun Gong.
