= Li Hongzhi =

Chinese religious leader and dissident (born 1951 or 1952)

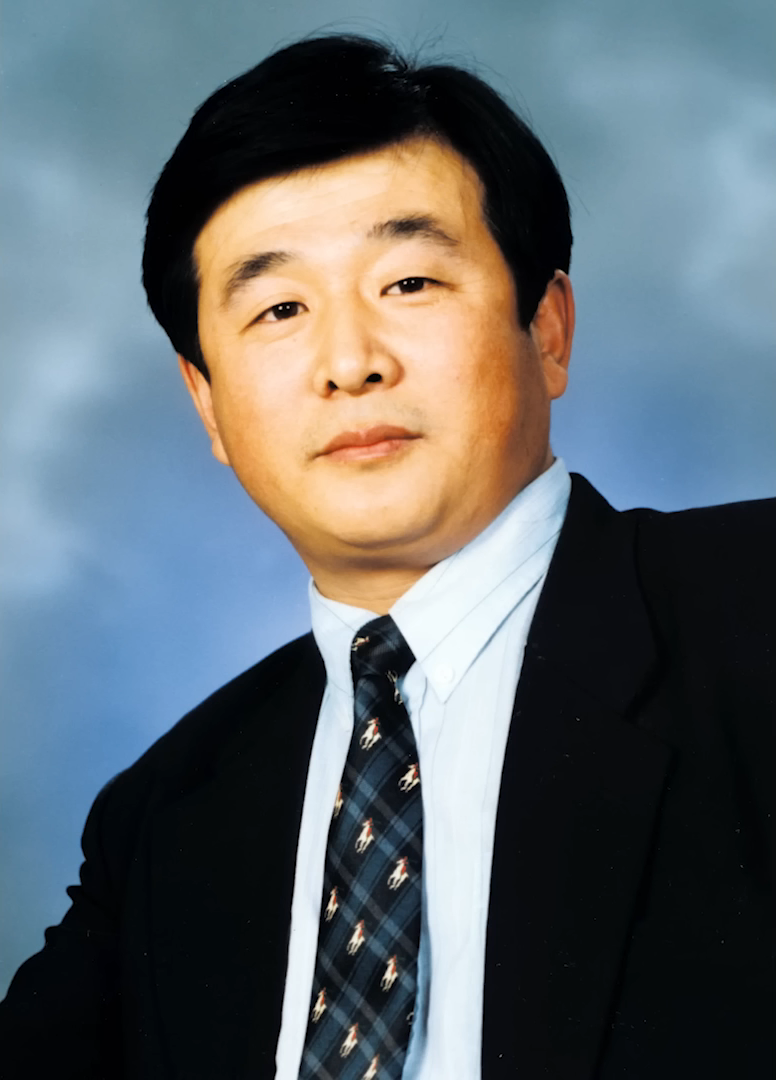
- Li in 1999
- Born: Li Lai; 7 July 1952 (age 74) (official Chinese birth date and name); 13 May 1951 (age 75) (Falun Gong birth date, no birth name); Gongzhuling, Jilin, China
- Known for: Founder and leader of Falun Gong

Chinese name
- Chinese: 李洪志
Transcriptions
Standard Mandarin
- Hanyu Pinyin: Lǐ Hóngzhì
- IPA: [lì xʊ̌ŋ.ʈʂî]

Li Hongzhi (Chinese: 李洪志; born 1951 or 1952) is a Chinese religious leader. He is the founder and leader of Falun Gong, or Falun Dafa, a United States–based new religious movement. Li began his public teachings of Falun Gong on 13 May 1992 in Changchun and subsequently gave lectures and taught Falun Gong exercises across China.

Li's first public demonstration was at the 1992 Oriental Health Expo in Beijing. Reportedly, Li "apparently" helped a paralysed and wheelchair-bound man to walk again, as well as having cured "difficult and complex illnesses of all kinds". The fair's director subsequently announced Falun Gong as being the "star cultivation system". The event helped cement Li's popularity, while journalistic reports of Falun Gong's healing capabilities grew.

In his lectures and books, Li presented himself as a leader possessing extraordinary supernatural abilities, including levitation and invisibility. According to Li's writings, he can create invisible copies of himself called "Fashen", which monitor and ensure the proper cultivation of his followers. He also teaches that he can install a supernatural Falun (Dharma Wheel) in his followers' lower abdomen, which he says help purify them and improve their health. Li also teaches 5 exercises that practitioners perform to maintain the Falun and support their cultivation.

Central to Falun Gong are the principles of zhēn 眞, shàn 善 and rěn 忍 (which translate approximately as truthfulness, benevolence, and forbearance), which Li describes as the fundamental characteristics of the universe. Assimilation to the supreme nature of the universe, Zhen-Shan-Ren, is the foundation of cultivation practice. This involves upgrading one's xīnxìng 心性 (mind-nature) by abandoning negative attachments and assimilating oneself to "Truthfulness-Compassion-Forbearance". The five meditative exercises are regarded as complementary to this process of self-improvement.

Li's movement had gained significant popularity as a health-enhancing practice in the 1990s, including in certain government and qigong circles during the qigong fever. However, from the early 1990s, qigong as a science became increasingly a target of criticism by both authorities and media for failing to provide replicable conclusive proof for its paranormal claims. As the Chinese authorities' attitude toward the broader qigong movement changed, Li moved to the United States in 1995 to avoid conflicts with authorities and began teaching Falun Gong abroad. He settled in the U.S. as a permanent resident in 1998. Falun Gong was later suppressed by the Chinese government in 1999 and was branded a "heretical organization," followed by a multifaceted propaganda campaign, systematic torture, illegal imprisonment, forced labor, and alleged forced organ harvesting.

Li has been also associated with performance arts group Shen Yun ("Divine Rhythm"), and the media organizations The Epoch Times and New Tang Dynasty Television, which operate as extensions of Falun Gong. They have promoted Falun Gong's philosophical beliefs and unfounded conspiracy theories. Li has stated that he believes extraterrestrial aliens from other dimensions walk the Earth and are responsible for introducing technology, war, and immorality. Li says that he is a being who has come to help humankind from the destruction it could face as the result of rampant evil. When asked if he was a human being, Li replied "You can think of me as a human being."

== Early life ==
There are competing accounts of Li's life that surfaced before and after the suppression of Falun Gong began in July 1999, and there is very little authoritative information on his early life. Accounts between Li's supporters and detractors diverge significantly, and as a result, can be understood within the context of the political and spiritual purposes for which different narratives were developed.

=== Hagiography ===
An unofficial biography appeared in the first of Li's major publications, Zhongguo Falun Gong, and was written by journalist Zhu Huiguang. A second, official spiritual biography appeared in early editions of Falun Gong's primary text, Zhuan Falun, and was written by the Falun Dafa Research Society. As such, this account can be understood as part of Li's (and his religion's) publicity campaign against the People's Republic of China. These biographies placed emphasis on Li's spiritual development, with minimal details on Li's ordinary work or family life. The style and content of these biographies is consistent with the "centuries-old tradition of religious biography in China." As Benjamin Penny wrote, "as with its precursors [in Chinese history], this biography seeks to establish a genealogy of the figure whose life is recorded and to buttress the orthodoxy of his doctrine." Both biographies were omitted from later printings of Falun Gong books, as Li explained that he did not want people to focus their attention on his own history or circumstances.

These biographies state that Li was born in the town of Gongzhuling, Jilin Province. The first account, by Zhu Huiguang, stated that Li's family lived amidst poverty. In this edition, Li was described as developing a "spirit of bearing hardships and tolerating hard work" as he helped care for his younger siblings. The second, official version of his biography emphasized Li's average social background, stating that he belonged to an "ordinary intellectual's family".

Both biographies ascribe to Li innate virtues of compassion and discipline. The official biography focuses mainly on the lineage of Daoist and Buddhist masters who it says provided Li with instruction from an early age. At four, he was trained by Quan Jue, the Tenth Heir to the Great Law of the Buddha School. By age eight, he had acquired "the superb great law with supernatural powers," which was supposed to include invisibility, levitation, etc. Master Quan left him at age twelve, to be replaced by Taoist master Baji Zhenren, who provided instruction in martial arts and physical skills.

A third Master arrived in 1972 from the Great Way School. Zhendaozi came from the Changbai Mountains near the North Korean border. Unlike Li's other spiritual tutors, Zhendaozi wore ordinary attire, and taught Li the way of inner cultivation through Qigong, stressing xinxing (i.e. "mind or heart nature, moral character"). Li's training in this period mostly took place under cover of night, possibly due to the political environment of the Cultural Revolution. Zhu Haiguang's version of the biography notes that Li consistently refused to take part in the campaigns of the Cultural Revolution, never joining the Red Guards or communist organizations.

A fourth Master—a woman from the Buddha School—began instructing Li in 1974. After training with these four Masters, Li's "energy potency had reached a very high level." His personal development plateaued around this time, with the biography stating that Li was able "to see the truth of the universe, many more beautiful things which have existed there for a long time, as well as the origin, development and future of mankind."

In 1982, Li moved to the city of Changchun for "civilian employment," the implication being that his previous work was with the military. At some point in the 1980s, Li married and had a daughter.

In 1984, Li began synthesizing the teachings he received into what would become Falun Dafa. The practice would not be exactly the same as what had been transmitted to him, as those systems were not suitable to be "popularised on a large scale." Li began observing the teaching methods of other qigong masters, and by 1989 had finalised his qigong system. For the next three years until 1992, Li was said to have begun testing the system with a small group of students.

Falun Gong books published after 1999 no longer contain biographies of Li. These changes reflected a larger trend of Li retreating from the public eye. Since 2000 he has rarely appeared in public, his presence being almost entirely electronic or re-routed through quotations on Falun Gong's websites. Li Hongzhi's biography was removed from Falun Gong websites some time after 2001.

=== Details published by Chinese government ===
The Chinese government began publishing biographies of Li after the suppression of Falun Gong began in July 1999. As such, details on Li's life published in the PRC can be understood as part of the government's publicity campaign against Falun Gong. Their objective was to "demonstrate that Li Hongzhi was thoroughly ordinary and that his claims to exceptional abilities and experiences were fraudulent."

Li was born in 1951 or 1952. His parents divorced whilst he was a toddler, and Li and his siblings remained with his mother. In 1955 they relocated to Changchun.

Li is said to have attended primary and middle school in Changchun between 1960 and 1970. As with most school-aged children in China, Li's formal education was interrupted by the Cultural Revolution. He did not attend high school, but ultimately completed high school through correspondence courses in the 1980s. Chinese government accounts emphasize repeatedly that Li lacks a higher education, and was an undistinguished student, notable only for playing the trumpet.

After attaining his middle school diploma in 1970, Li was said to have held "a series of unremarkable jobs": between 1970 and 1972, Li worked at an army horse farm; from 1972 to 1978, was a trumpet player in a forest police unit in Jilin Province, and subsequently worked as a clerk in the Grain and Oil Procurement company in Changchun. Unnamed former classmates and co-workers cited in government accounts stress repeatedly that Li was unremarkable, that they never saw him practising qigong, and that they had no knowledge of the Buddhist and Daoist Masters Li claimed to have studied under.

A group of early adopters in Changchun became disenchanted after Li forbade his followers from charging fees for the practice at the end of 1994, amongst other things. The group left the Falun Gong movement, and proceeded to send to government ministries a series of accusations against Li, among them that he had not shown any supernatural powers during his youth. Falun Gong sent detailed rebuttals to the ministries. Following the suppression of Falun Gong in 1999, Chinese authorities republished all these accusations, point by point.

=== Birth date controversy ===
Li's date of birth became a controversy after 1999. Falun Gong sources published that Li was born on 13 May 1951. The Chinese government published his birthday as 7 or 27 July 1952, pointing out that his claimed birthday was the same as Gautama Buddha. As evidence of the 1952 birth, authorities quoted Pan Yufang, a midwife who recalled delivering Li in July 1952. Pan's account included the assertion that she used oxytocin to assist in the birth, which was disputed by Falun Gong practitioners as they claimed that oxytocin was not available until after 1953. Professor David Ownby wrote in 2008 that Li Hongzhi was born Li Lai on 27 July 1952 in Gongzhuling, Jilin province, China. The Chinese government said that Li changed his name from Lai to Hongzhi because Hongzhi, meaning vast will, sounded more revolutionary. In 2017, Professor James R. Lewis analyzed a 2015 report by Kaiwind, an anti-cult non-profit group in China, and agreed with their photographic evidence that Li was born on 7 July 1952. The Kaiwind report documented how Li approached a friend in government service who helped him change his government identification papers in late September 1994, and that the necessary government clerk's signature was forged by a policewoman named Sun Lixian, who changed his birthdate and his government identification number, after which he was issued a new identification card in October.

Li does not argue that he changed his identification in 1994, but he said his date of birth had been misprinted as one of the pervasive bureaucratic errors of the Cultural Revolution, and he was merely correcting it. Regarding the accusation that he selected Gautama Buddha's birthday as his own, Li characterized it as a "smear", and said, "What's the big deal about having the same birthday as Sakyamuni [Gautama Buddha]? Many criminals were also born on that date. I have never said that I am Sakyamuni. I am just a very ordinary man." However, Li has claimed a variety of superhuman powers, such as the power to become invisible.

== Falun Gong ==
Li Hongzhi followed Li Weidong's "Chanmi Gong" in 1988. Then, he took a class of "Jiugong Bagua Gong" offered by Yu Guangshen. Falun Gong was produced on the basis of these two practices. Li Hongzhi introduced Falun Dafa, or the Great Law of the Wheel of Dharma, on 13 May 1992 (Li's 41st birthday as claimed) at the fifth Middle School in Changchun, Jilin. From 1992 to 1994 he traveled throughout China, giving lectures and teaching Falun Gong exercises; his following grew rapidly. Li's success was largely linked to the popularity enjoyed by qigong in the late 1980s and early 1990s under Deng Xiaoping's social liberalization. Although qigong had high-level supporters, it was also subject to criticism with many detractors labelling it as a "superstition". According to David Ownby, the critics eventually "gained the upper hand" in influencing China's political authorities by the early 1990s.

From the early 1990s, qigong science increasingly became a target of criticism by both authorities and media for failing to provide replicable conclusive proof of "Exceptional Functions" (supernatural abilities). Against this changing environment, David Palmer writes that in 1994 Li began differentiating his teachings from other qigong movements, asserting that Falun Gong was not a form of qigong but rather a "higher universal Dharma". He downgraded "Exceptional Functions" as being "lower forms of qigong", and placed greater emphasis on moral content and salvation within a millenarian framework. He also prioritised "accessibility to the public" and distancing away from esoteric notions often found in other Qigong systems.

Falun Gong's teachings are compiled from Li's lectures, and he holds definitional power in the Falun Gong belief system. Li claims that he holds supernatural powers like clairvoyance, an ability to prevent illness, as well as having eternal youth. He created a program that promises practitioners that they will have perfect health and supernatural powers quickly and easily. He was also critical of alternative systems within the Qigong movement, stating it was "rife with false teachings and greedy and fraudulent 'masters'" and set out to rectify it. Li said that Falun Gong was a part of a "centuries-old tradition of cultivation", and in his texts would often attack those who taught "incorrect, deviant, or heterodox ways". Rather than merely pursuing physical health or supernatural abilities, Li emphasized moral cultivation as a mean to "purify one's heart and attain spiritual salvation".

Ian Johnson pointed out that during the greatest period of Falun Gong book sales in China, Li Hongzhi never received any royalties because all publications were bootleg. Li's success also had a large part to do with people seeking alternative medicine treatments at a time when China's health care system was struggling desperately to meet demand. As the Master of the Falun Gong cultivation system, Li claimed to "purify the students' bodies" and "unblock their main and collateral channels" and in doing so "remove the root of their disease", if they were ill. He also reputedly planted a Falun or "law wheel" in the abdomen of each student, and other "energy mechanisms" in other parts of their bodies. Li also described how his "Law bodies" will protect each practitioner and how he "clear[s] up the students' house and places of practice and then put[s] a covering of safety'". In Li's Falun Gong teachings, he emphasizes that practitioners should abide by the moral principles of truth, compassion and forbearance, in their daily lives. According to New Zealand scholar Heather Kavan, these principles have been repeated by Falun Gong members to outsiders as a tactic for evading deeper inquiry. Li has instructed his followers to lie to outsiders about Falun Gong.

According to Falun Gong groups, Li's early success was recognized at the 1992 and 1993 Beijing Oriental Health Expos. At the first of these events, the fair's organizer remarked that Falun Gong and Li "received the most praise [of any qigong school] at the fair, and achieved very good therapeutic results". The event helped cement Li's popularity in the qigong world, and journalistic reports of Falun Gong's healing powers spread. The following year, Li was made a member of the organizing committee of the Beijing Health Expo, and won several awards and commendations at the event.

During the early 1990s, Li developed a positive rapport with the Ministry of Public Security (MPS). In 1993, he provided treatment for 100 police officers who had been injured on the job, earning praise from an organization under the MPS. Li gave lectures at the Public Security University in Beijing in 1994, and contributed proceeds from the seminars to a foundation for injured police officers. The publishing ceremony for Li's book, Zhuan Falun, was held in the auditorium of the Ministry of Public Security in January 1995.

In his lectures, Li has claimed he possesses extraordinary supernatural powers and that he has been engaged for years in a process called Fa-rectification, which he describes as an effort to restructure the laws governing the dimensions inhabited by humans. According to Li's doctrine, only the righteous and practitioners of Falun Dafa can pass to the next dimension and be "saved". However, everything from the "old world" as humans currently know it, as well as immoral humans will either be destroyed or fall into "much lower levels of existence". According to Benjamin Penny, Falun Gong teachings are clearly intended to present itself as being a path to salvation where Li "diagnoses" the present condition of humanity and prescribing guidances to practitioners to help them "transcend" their "degraded, fallen state".

Scholars such as David Palmer and David Ownby identify elements of apocalyptic or millenarian ideas in Li's teaching. They note that Li has stated that the world has been destroyed and recreated eighty-one times and that, due to the moral degradation of society, another round of destruction is imminent. Danny Schechter, however, quoted Li as specifically rejecting predictions of an apocalyptic event for the year 1999. Li said at a lecture that "I can proclaim here to everyone in all earnestness that all of those so-called catastrophes of the earth or of the universe and things of this kind in the year 1999 simply do not exist." Schechter also reported that Falun Gong practitioners told him that Li has always discouraged theories predicting dooms-day scenarios of the kind found in many religious communities.

French sociologist David Palmer stated that Li had claimed that he is the first person to have introduced the Fa (the Fundamental law of the universe) to mankind and that he possesses the power to prevent a prophesied explosion of the universe. He claimed that the universe had no future before he undertook his mission and he stated in 1997 that he had prevented the prophesied 1997 destruction of the universe.

In early 2000s, scholar David Ownby stated, “My reading of Li’s teachings acknowledges the existence of apocalyptic elements, but I do not ﬁnd that such themes were highlighted prior to the stresses brought about by the crackdown. In fact, even practitioners to whom I spoke after the crackdown rarely mentioned apocalyptic themes.”

Later accounts, however, provide evidence of apocalyptic themes in the religious mission surrounding Shen Yun. A 2024 New York Times investigation reported that many practitioners viewed the opportunity to perform in Shen Yun as a sacred honor, reflecting Li's teachings that these shows are "part of his quest to save humanity from a coming apocalypse". The religious significance of this mission was also evident in the experience of Shen Yun dancers. In 2026, a former Shen Yun dancer told Radio France Internationale (RFI) that, as children, they had been taught through Falun Gong teachings that their "entire existence" was to save "sentient beings" because they were made to believe that the "apocalypse" was coming.

According to both Helen Farley and James R. Lewis, Li explicitly discouraged practitioners from discussing his more "esoteric" or "higher-level" spiritual teachings with "outsiders". Lewis argues that this deliberate withholding of teachings was highly effective in "shaping the opinions of non-Chinese observers".

== Life abroad ==
In 1995, Li declared that he had finished teaching Falun Gong in China, and began spreading the practice abroad. His first stop in March 1995 was to the Chinese embassy in Paris, where he had been invited to teach the practice. This was followed by seminars in Sweden. Between 1995 and 1999, Li gave lectures in Australia, Canada, Germany, New Zealand, Singapore, Switzerland and the United States. Falun Gong associations and clubs began appearing in Europe, North America and Australia, with activities centered mainly on university campuses.

In 1995, in order to seek tighter control, Chinese authorities requested Li Hongzhi to incorporate Falun Gong into the state system and establish an internal Communist Party branch within Falun Gong. Li declined. By 1996, friction between Li and the state-run Qigong Research Society had grown as rival qigong masters claimed Li's free classes undercut their business; Li did not accommodate the demands to hike tuition and emphasized the need for the teachings to be free of charge. In March 1996, Falun Gong withdrew from the China Qigong Research Society. This move into independent operation left the group without official registration or the protections granted to state-sanctioned organizations. According to Yanfei Sun, a sociologist at China's state-run Zhejiang University, in March 1996, Li decided to withdraw Falun Gong's membership from the Qigong Research Society, stating that he sought to devote more time to Buddhist studies; and in September 1996, China Qigong Research Society published a report which criticised Li for deifying himself, propagating superstition, spreading political falsehoods, and therefore deviating from the society's mission and the proper aims of qigong.

In 1996, the city of Houston named Li as an honorary citizen and goodwill ambassador for his "unselfish public service for the benefit and welfare of mankind."

Li Hongzhi moved to the United States in 1996 with his wife and daughter, and in 1998 became a U.S. permanent resident, settling in New York.

In 1998, Li Hongzhi stated that he believes alien invaders walk the Earth and that modern science and race-mixing are part of their ploy to overtake humanity, and he has reportedly said that he can walk through walls and make himself invisible. Li says that he is a being from a higher level who has come to help humankind from the destruction it could face as the result of rampant evil. Regarding these concepts, he said, "You must not talk with ordinary people about the high-level things I have taught you. Instead, only talk about being persecuted... about our human rights being violated." Lewis says that Li's "emphatic" claims to his followers that he holds "exalted status", and his instructions to his followers to deflect outsiders from this fact, are contradictory to his teachings about "Truthfulness", a cornerstone of Falun Gong belief.

In May 1999, Li was welcomed to Toronto with greetings from the Mayor of Toronto and the Lieutenant Governor of Ontario, and in the two months that followed also received recognition from the cities of Chicago and San Jose.

On 29 July 1999, after Falun Gong was banned, the Ministry of Public Security of China leveled a series of charges against Li, including the charge of "disturbing public order" and issued a circular indicating his status as being wanted and pressing for his arrest. At that time, Li Hongzhi was living in the United States. The Chinese government's request to Interpol for his arrest was rejected on the grounds that the request was a matter "of a political or religious character" and lacked information on any "ordinary law crime he would have committed." The Chinese government also revoked his passport, preventing him from travelling internationally.

By April 2001, Li Hongzhi had received over 340 awards and proclamations from Australia, Canada, China (before crackdown), Japan, Russia, and the U.S. in recognition of the contributions to people's spiritual and physical health, and to freedom of belief in the world. These include certificates of recognition from several governmental bodies in the United States—including Honorary Citizenship awarded by The State of Georgia and city of Atlanta. On 14 March 2001, the Freedom House bestowed Li Hongzhi and Falun Gong with an International Religious Freedom Award for the advancement of religious and spiritual freedom at a ceremony in the United States Senate. He was nominated for the 2001 Sakharov Prize by over 25 members of European Parliament, was nominated for the Nobel Peace Prize in 2000 and 2001, and in 2013 was ranked by Foreign Policy Magazine as one of the 500 most powerful people in the world.

== Shen Yun, The Epoch Times, and political involvement ==
Performance arts group Shen Yun, the media organization The Epoch Times, and a variety of other organizations such as New Tang Dynasty Television operate as extensions of Falun Gong. These extensions promote Falun Gong and Hongzhi's teachings, and, in the case of The Epoch Times, promote conspiracy theories and far-right politics in the United States, Canada and Europe. According to a March 2020 report by Samuel Braslow published in Los Angeles Magazine:

In 2000, Li founded Epoch Times to disseminate Falun Gong talking points to American readers. Six years later he launched Shen Yun as another vehicle to promote his teachings to mainstream Western audiences. Over the years Shen Yun and Epoch Times, while nominally separate organizations, have operated in tandem in Falun Gong's ongoing PR campaign against the Chinese government, taking directions from Li.

Despite its conservative agenda, Epoch Times took pains until recently to avoid wading into partisan U.S. politics. That all changed in June 2015 after Donald Trump descended on a golden escalator to announce his presidential candidacy, proclaiming that he "beat China all the time". In Trump, Falun Gong saw more than just an ally—it saw a savior. As a former Epoch Times editor told NBC News, the group's leaders "believe that Trump was sent by heaven to destroy the communist party".

(Los Angeles Magazine retracted Braslow's article in September 2020 after Falun Gong filed a defamation lawsuit in May.)

The exact financial and structural connections between Falun Gong, Shen Yun, and The Epoch Times remains unclear. According to NBC News:

The Epoch Media Group, along with Shen Yun, a dance troupe known for its ubiquitous advertising and unsettling performances, make up the outreach effort of Falun Gong, a relatively new spiritual practice that combines ancient Chinese meditative exercises, mysticism and often ultraconservative cultural worldviews. Falun Gong's founder has referred to Epoch Media Group as "our media", and the group's practice heavily informs The Epoch Times' coverage, according to former employees who spoke with NBC News.

The Epoch Times, digital production company NTD and the heavily advertised dance troupe Shen Yun make up the nonprofit network that Li calls "our media". Financial documents paint a complicated picture of more than a dozen technically separate organizations that appear to share missions, money and executives. Though the source of their revenue is unclear, the most recent financial records from each organization paint a picture of an overall business thriving in the Trump era.

Reporter Bethany Allen-Ebrahimian speculates that Li Hongzhi's anti-miscegenation beliefs, based on the argument that multiracial heritage has no place in a supposedly race-segregated heaven, could have influenced The Epoch Times' support of German far-right nativism. Falun Gong's cosmology includes the belief that different ethnicities each have a correspondence to their own heavens, and that individuals of mixed race lose some aspect of this connection. Falun Gong's teachings include belief in reincarnation and that one's soul (original spirit) always maintains a single racial identity despite having a body of mixed race. Investigative journalist Ethan Gutmann noted that interracial marriage is common in the Falun Gong community.

== See also ==
- Chinese people in the New York metropolitan area
