= Benjamin Penny =

Australian academic

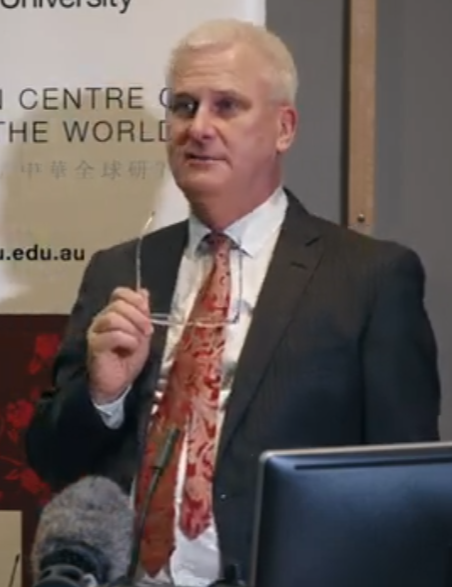
- At an ANU lecture in 2022
- Born: 27 October 1959 (age 66); Melbourne, Australia
- Education: Newington College; University of Sydney; University of Cambridge; Australian National University
- Occupations: Associate professor research fellow, School of Culture, History & Language; Australian National University; College of Asia and the Pacific
- Website: Benjamin Penny at NLA

Benjamin David Penny (born 27 October 1959) is an Australian academic specialising in religious and spiritual movements in modern and contemporary China. He is a Harold White Fellow at the National Library of Australia.

His area of speciality is Falun Gong as well as the interpretation of Chinese religions by westerners and the history of the religions of Chinese Australians. The Times Literary Supplement states that in The Religion of Falun Gong Penny "makes a good case for defining Falun Gong as a modern Chinese religion. . . . [He] provides an admirable guide to the short history of Falun Gong and the eclectic complexities of its doctrine, which he sets within the framework of indigenous religious belief over the centuries."

== Family and education ==
Penny is the younger brother of professor Simon Penny (born 1955) who is a theorist, curator and teacher in the field of Interactive Media Art. Benjamin Penny was born in Melbourne and attended Newington College (1972–1977). He was awarded a Bachelor of Arts from the University of Sydney, a Master of Philosophy from University of Cambridge and a PhD from the Australian National University.

Benjamin has a son.

== Career ==
After university study, Penny was a post-doctoral fellow at the ANU. From 1999 until 2005, he was the first Executive Officer of the Herbert and Valmae Freilich Foundation. During the years 2003 and 2004 he was a research fellow at the Centre for Cross-Cultural Research. Penny was appointed to the Division of Pacific and Asian History in October 2005. Since January 2010 he has been Deputy Director, and a Research Fellow, at the School of Culture, History & Language ANU College of Asia and the Pacific.

== Awards ==
- Harold White Fellow
- The Religion of Falun Gong won Choice Magazine's Outstanding Academic Title Awards.

== Selected publications ==
- "On the Acquisition of Moral Character", in Geremie R. Barmé and Jeremy Goldkorn (eds.), China Story Yearbook 2014: Shared Destiny, Canberra: Australian Centre on China in the World 2014.
- "An Exemplary Society", in Geremie R. Barmé and Jeremy Goldkorn (eds.), China Story Yearbook 2013: Civilising China, Canberra: Australian Centre on China in the World, 2013.
- "Searching for a Sage Today", in Geremie R. Barmé with Jeremy Goldkorn, Carolyn Cartier and Gloria Davies (eds.), China Story Yearbook 2012: Red Rising Red Eclipse, Canberra: Australian Centre on China in the World, 2012.
- The Religion of the Falun Gong, Chicago: University of Chicago Press, 2012.
- "Karmic Retribution, Animal Spirits, Falun Gong and the State", in Mayfair Yang, Chinese Religiosities: Afflictions of Modernity and State Formation, Berkeley: University of California Press, 2008.
- "Master Li Encounters Jesus: Christianity and the Configurations of Falun Gong", W. Smith, M. Tomlinson, and L. Manderson (eds.), Beliefs beyond Borders: Faith, Spiritual Practice and Communities in Asia/Pacific, New York: Springer, 2012.
- "More than One Adam?: Revelation and Philology in Nineteenth-Century China", Humanities Research, XIV, 2007.
- "An Immigrant Chinese Sea God in Australia: The Chinese Background to Sydney's Retreat Street Temple", Chinese Southern Diaspora Studies, 2, 2008.
- Daoism in history: essays in honour of Liu Ts'un-Yan London: Routledge, 2006.
- Religion and biography in China and Tibet Richmond, Surrey: Curzon, 2002.
