= Vision China Times =

Chinese language newspaper in Australia

- General manager: Maree Ma
- Language: Chinese
- Website: www.visiontimes.com.au

Vision China Times Australia is a Chinese language newspaper owned by the Vision Times Media (Australia) Corporation Pty Ltd. Vision China Times Australia was established as a weekly newspaper in Australia in July 2006, based on a widely-read overseas Chinese news website, secretchina.com, which was launched in 2001 in the United States and is known as Vision Times or Kanzhongguo. The newspaper has been described as part of the media outreach of Falun Gong, an anti-communist new religious movement, although this has been contested by the paper's Australian editorial team.

== Distribution, features and history ==
The Vision China Times Australia newspaper has distributions in Sydney, Melbourne, Brisbane and Gold Coast. The newspaper is distributed in Perth on a fortnightly basis in a magazine style.

The focus is on bringing relevant information to the Australia Chinese diaspora. The newspaper aims to "serve the Australian society by truly connecting the Chinese community with the Western mainstream through balanced reporting, promotion of both Australian and Chinese traditional cultures and values, and communicating the policies and views of the Australian government to the Chinese community in an unbiased way".

Founder Ma Zhendong, a Sydney businessman, practices Falun Gong with his wife. Their daughter, Maree Ma, manages the newspaper.

Vision China Times Australia is noted for being a Chinese language media outlet that is independent from the Chinese government.

The chief editor of Vision China Times Australia, Yan Xia, wrote in 2016: "The Chinese government’s growing influence on local Chinese language media reinforces viewpoints that become even more entrenched over time, making it more difficult for Chinese readers to accept alternative perspectives. ... Recent disharmony within the Chinese community and dissatisfaction with the Australian government are manifestations of the extent of China’s influence on local Chinese media. ... We consider it our duty to provide impartial news helping to bridge the cultural and political divide between the East and West. This duty cannot be shirked, but Beijing’s manipulation and meddling makes it no easy task."

=== Opposition from China ===
In 2019, a joint Fairfax and Four Corners investigation found that the Chinese Consulate-General in Sydney pressured the Georges River Council to withdraw Vision China Times Australia's sponsorship for a local community event.

Vision China Times told the South China Morning Post that Chinese state security agents had pressured one of its China-based advertisers into pulling its contract with the paper.

At a Chinese Foreign Ministry press conference in Beijing, the newspaper was described as "Falun Gong-backed media". The newspaper responded, "We are an independent Chinese media company with no financial affiliation to any religious or political organisations." In 2019, Vision China Times along with The Epoch Times was subject to pressure in Australia from the Chinese government, which described both newspapers as backed by the Falun Gong. Because of the pressure, advertisers withdrew for fear of retribution from China.

General manager Maree Ma of Vision China Times told the Sydney Morning Herald that it had lost more than 90 percent of its mainland Chinese website traffic in one day in August 2019 and suspected that the Chinese government had blacklisted its site.

=== Relationship between Vision Times and Falun Gong ===
Ben Hurley, a writer for The Epoch Times until 2013, wrote in 2017 about how various media outlets had been established as a voice for Falun Gong, including The Epoch Times, New Tang Dynasty Television, China Uncensored on YouTube, Sound of Hope on radio, and Vision China Times.

In 2020, an Australian Broadcasting Corporation investigation said it found evidence that Vision China Times "is closely affiliated with the religious group Falun Gong, a new religious movement that seeks to bring an end to the rule of the Chinese Communist Party (CCP)", that it was sharing a "business address with Decode China, a Chinese language news website established under a funding arrangement by the U.S. State Department", and that it operates under an annual financial contract with the global Vision Times network, "whose president is also the spokesperson for the Falun Dafa Association in New York, and the chair of another Falun Gong organisation called Quit the CCP." The report also said that "Falun Gong's founder Li Hongzhi refers to Vision Times as 'our media.'" David Brophy of Sydney University described Vision China Times as "pushing an extremely conservative right-wing viewpoint on global politics, a very black and white view of the world in which China represents evil, America represents all that is good and essentially the source of human freedom," and questioned its motives and independence: "There's clearly a question as to the nature of this publication, its independence, its relationship to a religious and political organisation". In response, Vision China Times told ABC that "We are not a FLG media", and that apart from a payment for yearly news sources, it had no operational or financial deals with Vision Times or Falun Gong. The operator of Vision China Times, Vision Times Media Australia, claimed the ABC had wrongly tied the company to a US publisher of a similar name. However, ABC found that 12 staff members of Vision China Times had worked for Falun Gong's Epoch Times. The think tank Australian Strategic Policy Institute (ASPI) reported that the Australian and the US operators of Vision China Times had both used the URL secretchina but with different domain names. ASPI also noted that Chief Editor Yan Xia denies that Vision China Times takes direction from the Falun Gong.

A Decode China media statement to the ABC stated that on 24 July 2020, it was notified the project had been terminated by the U.S. State Department and "the project will no longer go ahead". The U.S. government said on 6 August 2020 that it had recently ended its relationship with Decode China. Vision China Times’ general manager, Maree Ma, was listed as secretary of Decode China in company records.
