= List of websites blocked in mainland China =

Many domain names are blocked in mainland China under the country's Internet censorship policy, which prevents users from accessing certain websites from within the country.

This is a list of the most notable such blocked websites in the country. This page does not apply to Hong Kong or Macau. For a list of websites blocked in Hong Kong, see Internet censorship in Hong Kong.

Currently, SIM cards from outside China are subject to different blocking strategies when roaming in China. Certain political and news websites are blocked in China.

== Table of high-ranking websites blocked in mainland China ==
Website	Category	Primary language	Duration of blockage	Current status
Google	Search	Multilingual	2010–2014 (google.com.hk still available), 2014–present (completely)	Blocked
YouTube	Video	Multilingual	2007 – 2008, 2009–present	Blocked
Quora	Question and answer	Multilingual	2018–present	Blocked
Facebook	Social	Multilingual	July (or earlier) 2009–present	Blocked
Yahoo	Search	Multilingual	28 February 2021 – present	Unblocked (service unavailable)
Yahoo Japan	Search	Japanese	15 June–17, 2012 and September 2017 -present	Partial blocked (word search, photo search blocked, but other services such as Yahoo News and Yahoo Mail remain accessible).
Wikipedia	Encyclopedia	Multilingual	23 April 2019 – present	Blocked
Marxists Internet Archive	Encyclopedia	Multilingual	About 2005–no later than 2007; blocked again as of 2026	Blocked
Reddit	Social	Multilingual	2018–present	Blocked
IMDB	Online and offline	English	Unknown	Unblocked
Netflix	Entertainment	Multilingual	2012–present	Unblocked (Service unavailable)
Zoom	Videotelephony	English	9 September to November 2019	Unblocked
Blogspot	Blog	English	May 2009–present	Blocked
Bing	Search	Multilingual	23 to 24 January 2019	Unblocked (Service unavailable, redirects to Chinese version – cn.bing.com)
Instagram	Image Sharing	Multilingual	September 2014–present	Blocked
WhatsApp	Messaging	Multilingual	September 2017–present	Blocked
Twitch	Streaming	English	17 September 2018–present	Blocked
Steam Store	Entertainment	Multilingual	25 December 2021–present	Partially blocked, sometimes could be accessed normally, sometimes inaccessible
Steam Community	Social	Multilingual	15 December 2017–present	Blocked
Spotify	Music streaming	Multilingual	7 October 2008–present	Unblocked (web version unavailable)
Messenger	Messaging	Multilingual	August 2011–present	Blocked
X	Social	English	June 2009–present	Blocked
Telegram	Messaging	Multilingual	July 2015–present	Blocked
Threads	Social	Multilingual	4 July 2023–present	Blocked
LinkedIn	Social	Multilingual	October 2021–2023	Partially accessible; the main domain is generally accessible, while some pages are intermittently disrupted. LinkedIn discontinued its separate China-focused InCareer service on 9 August 2023.
Skype	Social	Multilingual	November 2017–5 May 2025	Blocked (Service stopped)
Tumblr	Social	English	25 May 2016–present	Blocked
Pinterest	Image sharing	Multilingual	March 2017–present	Blocked
SoundCloud	Music streaming	Multilingual	September 2013–present	Blocked
Signal Private Messenger	Instant messaging	Multilingual	16 March 2021 – present	Blocked
Dropbox	File sharing	Multilingual	May 2010 – February 2014; June 2014 – present	Blocked
Pornhub	Pornography	Multilingual	2012, May to 2016, April, to present	Blocked
Medium	News	English	2016, 15 April to present	Blocked
FC2	Blogging host Video hosting service	Multilingual	30 April 2013 – present	Blocked
Dailymotion	Sharing	English	2007, 11 April to present	Blocked
BBC	News and broadcasting	English	2014, 15 October to present	Blocked
The New York Times	Publication	English	2012 to present	Blocked
Vimeo	Video Sharing	Multilingual	2009, October to present	Blocked
Pixiv	Online community	Multilingual	September 2017 – present	Blocked
The Guardian	News	English	June 2019 to present	Blocked
SlideShare	Slide hosting service	English	June 2012 to present	Blocked
Discord	Messaging	Multilingual	2018, 13 July to present	Blocked
DeviantArt	Art display	English	2008, 15 December to present	Blocked
The Washington Post	News	English	June 2019 to present	Blocked
Nico Video	Sharing	Japanese	Unknown to present	Blocked
Archive.org (Internet Archive)	Web archiving	English	2011, April (or earlier) to Present	Blocked
Bloomberg	Publication	English	2012, July to present	Blocked
Flickr	Sharing	English	2007, 7 June to present	Blocked
Wretch	Blog	Chinese	2007, August to 2012	Blocked (discontinued)
HuffPost	News	English	June 2019 to present	Blocked
The Wall Street Journal	News	English	No later than 22 September 2015 to present	Blocked
DuckDuckGo	Search	English	2014, September to present	Blocked
Scratch	Programming, Sharing	Multilingual	2020, 14 August to present	Partially Blocked (Not accessible)
Reuters	News	English	2015, 20 March, to present	Blocked
NBC News	News	English	June 2019 to present	Blocked
TIME	News	English	2016. 9 April to present	Blocked
Canadian Broadcasting Corporation (CBC)	News and broadcasting	English	2014 to present	Blocked
Australian Broadcasting Corporation (ABC)	News and broadcasting	English	2018, 22 August to present	Blocked
Bandcamp	Music	English	2021, February to present	Blocked
Technorati	Search	English	2008, July to Present	Blocked
Archive of Our Own	Fanfiction	Multilingual	2020, March, to present	Blocked
Viber	Messaging	Multilingual	2014, October to present	Blocked
South China Morning Post	News	English	2016 to present	Blocked
Plurk	Social	Multilingual	2009, April to Present	Blocked
The Economist	News	English	April 2016 – present	Blocked
ABC	News	Spanish	29 November 2021 – present	Blocked
Voice of America	News	English	Unknown – present	Blocked
Radio Free Asia	News, broadcasting	Multilingual	Unknown – present	Blocked
NBC	Broadcasting	English	June 2019 – present	Unblocked
PBworks	Sharing	English	January 2011 – present	Blocked
The Epoch Times	News	English	2003–present	Blocked
The Epoch Times (Chinese edition)	News	Chinese	1999–present	Blocked
HBO	Entertainment	English	June 2018 – present	Blocked
WION	News	English	July 2020 – present	Blocked
Hong Kong Free Press	News	English	November 2015 – present	Blocked
TikTok	Social	Multilingual	June 2020 – present	Blocked
ChatGPT	Artificial Intelligence	Multilingual	2023–present	Blocked
GitHub	Code hosting	English	Jan 2013 – present	Partially blocked
Hugging Face	Artificial Intelligence	Multilingual	2023–present	Blocked
Clubhouse	Social	English	February 2021 – present	Blocked
Truth Social	Social Media	English	February 2022 – present	Blocked
Kanzhongguo; (English)	Newspaper	English	Unknown-present	Blocked
Kanzhongguo; (Chinese)	Newspaper	Chinese	Unknown-present	Blocked
Microsoft Copilot	Artificial Intelligence	Multilingual	October 2024 – present	Blocked
Pincong	Social	Chinese	Unknown-present	Blocked
China News Digest	News	Chinese, English	1997–present	Blocked

== See also ==
- Censorship in China
- Censorship of Wikipedia
- Golden Shield Project
- Internet censorship in China
- List of websites blocked in Russia
