= Paul Sciarra =

American Internet entrepreneur

- Born: 1980 or 1981 (age 45–46)
- Education: Yale University
- Known for: Co-founding Pinterest

Paul Sciarra (born c. 1981) is an American Internet entrepreneur. He is a co-founder of Pinterest.

== Early life ==
Sciarra was born circa 1981. He graduated from Yale University.

== Career ==
Sciarra worked at the venture capital firm Radius Ventures, LLC. In 2003 he quit his job, along with Ben Silbermann, to create Cold Brew Labs. That same year, Sciarra, Silbermann and Evan Sharp launched Pinterest, and Sciarra became the president and CEO. In 2012, he left the company but remained on as an advisor.

After leaving Pinterest, Sciarra took a role as an entrepreneur-in-residence at venture capital firm Andreessen Horowitz. In 2014, he became executive chairman of Joby Aviation, after making its first outside investment.

== Personal life ==
Sciarra resides in San Francisco, California. According to Forbes, he was worth an estimated $550 million in 2016.
