= The Epoch Times =

International multi-language newspaper affiliated with Falun Gong

- Front page of The Epoch Times New York edition for March 18, 2016
- Type: International newspaper
- Format: Broadsheet
- Owner: Epoch Media Group
- Founder: John Tang
- Publisher: Epoch Media Group
- Founded: May 20, 2000; 26 years ago
- Political alignment: Far-right, right-wing, conservative
- Language: Multiple, mainly Chinese and English
- Headquarters: New York City, New York, United States of America
- Website: theepochtimes.com

The Epoch Times
- Traditional Chinese: 大紀元時報
- Simplified Chinese: 大纪元时报
Transcriptions
Standard Mandarin
- Hanyu Pinyin: Dàjìyuán Shíbào

The Epoch Times is an international multi-language newspaper and media company affiliated with Falun Gong, a new religious movement. It has been variously described as far-right, (Note: Sources describing The Epoch Times as a far-right publication:) right-wing, (Note: Sources describing The Epoch Times as a right-wing publication:) and conservative. (Note: Sources describing The Epoch Times as a conservative publication:) The newspaper, based in New York City, is part of the Epoch Media Group, which also operates New Tang Dynasty (NTD) Television. The Epoch Times has websites in 35 countries and is blocked in mainland China.

The Epoch Times opposes the Chinese Communist Party, promotes far-right politicians and movements in Europe, and has supported President Donald Trump in the U.S. A 2019 report by NBC News showed it to be the second-largest funder of pro-Trump Facebook advertising after the Trump campaign itself. Later that year, Facebook banned its advertisements for platform manipulation after the publication was found to have spent millions of dollars in advertising to promote Trump through a network of fraudulent Facebook accounts. The Epoch Times frequently runs stories promoting other Falun Gong–affiliated groups, such as the performing arts company Shen Yun. The Epoch Media Group's news sites and YouTube channels have promoted conspiracy theories including QAnon, the Great Replacement, anti-vaccine misinformation, false claims of fraud in the 2020 United States presidential election, and climate change denial. In 2026, the group's ex-chief financial officer, Bill Guan, pled guilty to running a $67 million fraud scheme that funneled illicit proceeds to the newspaper.

== History and relation to Falun Gong ==
The Epoch Times was founded in 2000 by John Tang and other Chinese Americans affiliated with the Falun Gong new religious movement. Tang was a graduate student in Georgia at the time; he began the newspaper in his basement. The founders said they were responding to censorship inside China and a lack of international understanding about the Chinese government's repression of Falun Gong. The Chinese Communist Party has banned Falun Gong.

By 2003, The Epoch Times website and group of newspapers had grown into one of the largest Chinese-language news sites and newspaper groups outside China, with local editions in the United States, Canada, Australia, New Zealand, Japan, Indonesia, Taiwan, Hong Kong, and major Western European countries. The first English edition launched online in 2003, followed by the first print edition in 2004. The English Australian edition was launched in Sydney in 2005.

Nick Couldry and James Curran wrote in 2003 that the newspaper represents a "major step in the evolution of Falun Gong-related alternative media" and may be part of a de facto media alliance with democracy activists in exile. In 2003, sociologist Yuezhi Zhao wrote that the newspaper "displays an indisputable ideological and organizational affinity with Falun Gong" and that it strongly emphasizes negative portrayals of the Chinese government and positive portrayals of Falun Gong. Per Zhao, The Epoch Times portrays itself as neutral, independent, and public-interest oriented.

In 2005, the San Francisco Chronicle reported that "three new U.S.-based, Chinese-language media outlets that provide provocative reporting about the Communist Party, government oppression and social unrest in China (namely The Epoch Times, Sound of Hope, and NTDTV) have ties to the Falun Gong spiritual movement". When interviewed, executives at each outlet claimed they did not represent the Falun Gong movement as a whole.

Associated Press reporter Nahal Toosi wrote in 2006 that it is "technically inaccurate" to say that Falun Gong owns The Epoch Times, though many of the newspaper's staff members are Falun Gong practitioners. Toosi noted: "some observers" have said that Falun Gong uses the newspaper for its public relations campaigns and that the newspaper is connected with the group and carries sympathetic coverage of it.

The English Epoch Times chair Stephen Gregory has denied that The Epoch Times is directly connected to Falun Gong. Independent reporters in the U.S. have confirmed the connection.

In 2008, David Ownby, director of the Center for East Asian Studies at the Université de Montréal and the author of Falun Gong and the Future of China, said Falun Gong practitioners set up the newspaper with their own money. He described The Epoch Times as wishing to be taken seriously as a global newspaper rather than being judged on the basis of its strong association with Falun Gong. He wrote: "Epoch Times is a newspaper with a mission, that of reporting on issues bearing on human rights throughout the world, which allows for considerable focus on China and Falun Gong."

Canadian scholar Clement Tong wrote that The Epoch Times "operates as a mouthpiece" for Falun Gong without an official statement of affiliation with the movement.

In 2009, Li Hongzhi, the founder of Falun Gong, appeared at the newspaper's headquarters in Manhattan and called for the expansion of The Epoch Times to "become regular media". Li has called The Epoch Times "our media", along with the NTD digital production company and the Shen Yun dance troupe. Two former employees said that top editors traveled to meet with Li at Falun Gong's compound, Dragon Springs, where he weighed in on editorial and strategic decisions; The Epoch Times denied that a meeting ever took place.

Former Epoch Times employees have noted Falun Gong practitioners' involvement in the management and editorial process. Former employees, some speaking anonymously, have said Epoch Times workers were encouraged to attend weekly "Fa study" sessions outside work hours to study Li's teachings. Former employees have said that criticizing The Epoch Times amounts to disobeying Li.

The Epoch Times runs frequent promotional stories about the related Shen Yun dance troupe. The New Yorker's review of Shen Yun called The Epoch Times "the world's foremost purveyor of Shen Yun content". In 2024, The New York Times reported that The Epoch Times has published at least 17,000 articles related to Shen Yun since 2009. According to the newspaper, articles about Shen Yun were reviewed by approved staff members before publication, who had been instructed to remove material considered damaging to the dance company. The newspaper also reported that The Epoch Times published articles promoting Shen Yun and attacking its critics by insinuating that they are agents of the Chinese Communist Party. Those targeted reportedly included a former dancer who had filed a forced-labor lawsuit against Shen Yun, as well as The New York Times, which had previously published an investigation into the company's controversial treatment of its performers.

In a 2018 report, the conservative think tank Hoover Institution wrote, "the space for truly independent Chinese-language media in the United States has shrunk to a few media outlets supported by the adherents of Falun Gong, the banned religious sect in China, and a small publication and website called Vision Times", the report noting that the latter is also associated with Falun Gong.

In a 2019 report, Reporters Without Borders wrote, "Aside from the Epoch Times newspaper and New Tang Dynasty Television, which are run by the Falun Gong, a religious movement persecuted in China, and China Digital Times, a website founded by a leading U.S.-based critic of the regime, the United States now has few truly independent diaspora media."

In 2019, an NBC News investigative report suggested The Epoch Times's political coverage may be affected by Falun Gong believers' anticipation of a judgment day in which communists are sent to hell and Falun Gong's allies are spared. Former Epoch Times employees told NBC News that Donald Trump is viewed as a key anti-communist ally, allegedly hastening that judgment day.

In 2020, Vox identified China Uncensored and NTD as affiliates of The Epoch Times, as part of a multilingual "media empire".

The Epoch Times sold a building in Middletown, New York, to Falun Gong-aligned website company Gan Jing World in 2022, with the building then opening as Gan Jing World's headquarters in July 2022. The Falun Dafa Gan Jing World Foundation was incorporated in 2023 at the same building in Middletown. Gan Jing World's director of media relations, Nick Janicki, has denied that there is any corporate connection between Gan Jing World and the Epoch Times, but said the founders are "good friends". The Epoch Times publishes articles promoting Gan Jing World, presenting them as news. In turn, media owned by Epoch Media Group are promoted on the Gan Jing World website, including on the front page. Gan Jing World's content consists of videos that are often republished from YouTube without the original creator's consent. In 2024, YouTube issued a cease and desist order to Gan Jing World for unauthorized republishing of content obtained from YouTube.

In 2024, The Epoch Times entered the film industry with Epoch Studios (a branch of the Epoch Times Association) and its first release, The Firing Squad starring Kevin Sorbo and Cuba Gooding Jr. The film was written and directed by Timothy A. Chey, and co-produced by Epoch Studios. The executive director of Epoch Studios, Sally Sun, has previously supervised Epoch documentaries and streaming specials.

== Finances ==
According to NBC News, "little is publicly known about the precise ownership, origins or influences of The Epoch Times", and it is loosely organized into several regional tax-free nonprofits, under the umbrella of the Epoch Media Group, together with New Tang Dynasty Television. The Epoch Times limits its expenses by primarily hiring unsalaried part-time volunteers.

The newspaper's revenue has increased rapidly in recent years, from $3.8 million in 2016 (equivalent to $5.1 million in 2025) to $8.1 million in 2017 (with spending of $7.2 million), $12.4 million in 2018, and $15.5 million in 2019. Tax documents indicate that between 2012 and 2016, the group received $900,000 from a principal at Renaissance Technologies, a hedge fund led at the time by the conservative political donor Robert Mercer. Chris Kitze, a former NBC executive and creator of the fake news website Before It's News, who also manages a cryptocurrency hedge fund, joined the newspaper's board as vice president in 2017.

A 2020 New York Times report called The Epoch Times's recent wealth "something of a mystery". Steve Bannon, the former executive chairman of Breitbart News, who produced a documentary with NTD, said "I'd give them a number" on a project budget and "they'd come back and say, 'We're good for that number.'" Former employees say they were told The Epoch Times is financed by subscriptions, ads, and donations from wealthy Falun Gong practitioners.

Between 2019 and 2021, The Epoch Times increased its revenue by 685 percent, reaching $122 million in 2021. Since 2019, it has gone mostly digital, spending millions on Facebook and YouTube advertisements (Facebook later banned the website, saying it "leveraged foreign actors posing as Americans to push political content"). As of 2023, The Epoch Times claimed to be the US newspaper with the fourth-highest number of subscribers; this ranking cannot be verified as circulation data is not audited by independent organizations.

As of 2024, The Epoch Times is one of the most popular free news apps in the Apple store, ahead of the Associated Press, NBC News, and the BBC. Its YouTube videos also receive millions of views. The Hong Kong Free Press has described The Epoch Times as "one of the most powerful digital publishers in the U.S."

=== Money laundering allegations ===
On June 3, 2024, the chief financial officer of The Epoch Times, Weidong "Bill" Guan, was indicted on federal charges in the Southern District of New York and charged with one count of conspiring to commit money laundering and two counts of bank fraud in a transnational scheme that lasted from 2020 to May 2024. The Department of Justice (DOJ) said that under Guan's leadership, The Epoch Times's Make Money Online team had purchased crime proceeds using cryptocurrency and transferred them into bank accounts held by entities affiliated with The Epoch Times. According to the DOJ, tens of millions in money laundered funds were transferred to The Epoch Times's bank accounts, inflating its revenue by 410 percent.

The Epoch Times said in a statement that it had suspended Guan until this matter is resolved. Founder John Tang later resigned from his role as CEO and the company's management was handed over to a transitional team. On July 1, 2024, Janice Trey was appointed as interim CEO. In response to the incident, the newspaper published statements written by Li Hongzhi, which criticized the newspaper's alleged financial misconduct and partisanship, calling on Falun Gong practitioners to cease making personal attacks on American political figures.

On July 9, 2026, Guan pleaded guilty to one conspiracy charge for participating in a scheme to launder fraud proceeds. In his plea, Guan admitted that he knew there was "a high probability" that money passing through accounts he oversaw "were the proceeds of criminality" but chose not to investigate further. As part of the plea agreement, prosecutors dropped the remaining charges. The Epoch Times stated that it was not a party to the litigation.

== Distribution and marketing ==
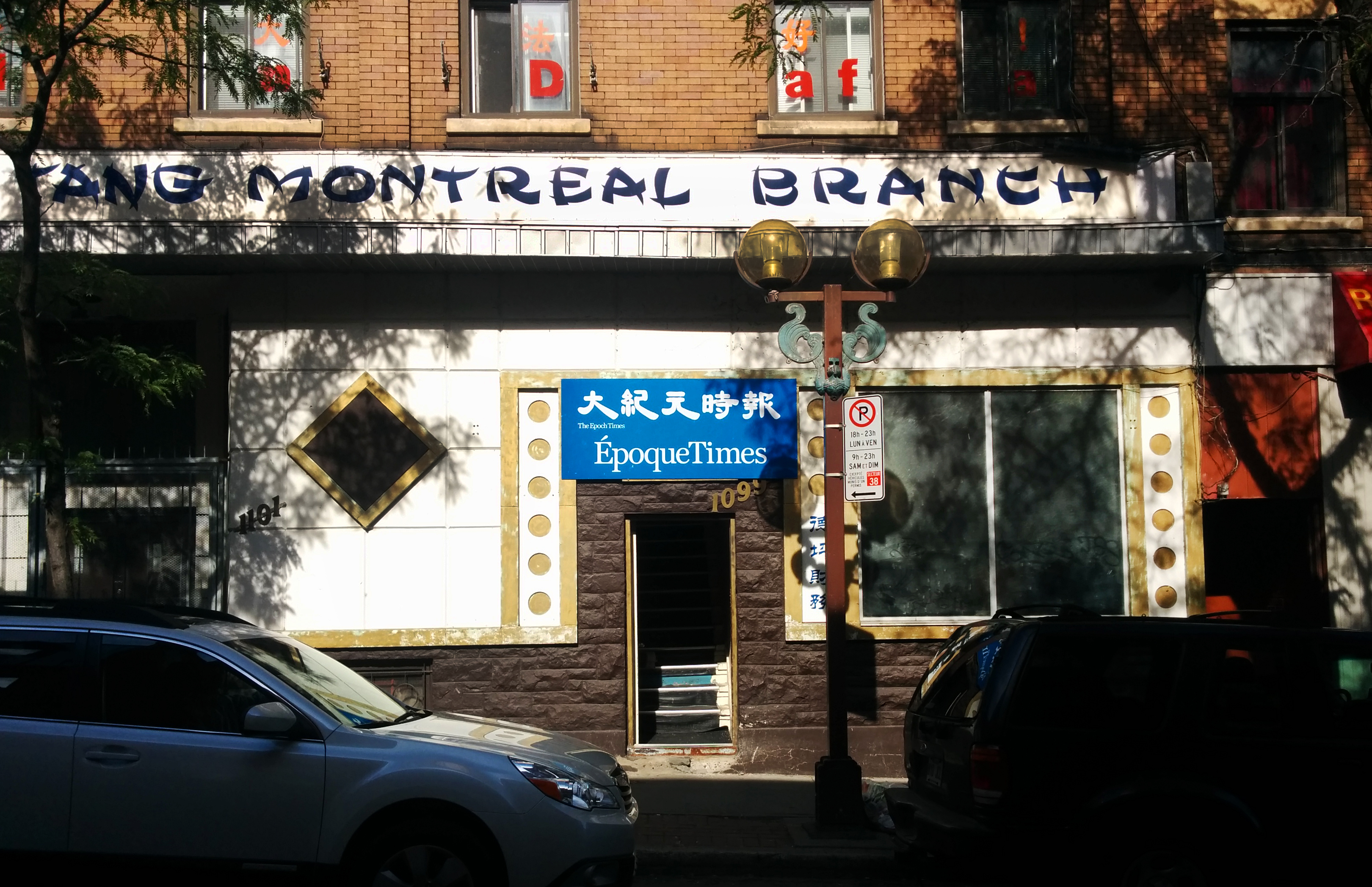
ÉpoqueTimes office in Montreal's Chinatown in 2015

The Epoch Times publishes in 21 languages and 33 countries, and has print editions in eight languages: Chinese, English, Spanish, Hebrew, Vietnamese, Japanese, Korean, and Indonesian. Special print editions have also been erratically published in France.

Between 2013 and 2020, The Epoch Times created 117,274 Facebook posts, rapidly increasing its social media audience by publishing its own far-right political content interspersed with clickbait entertainment videos obtained from media licensing companies such as Jukin Media. According to a Facebook report released in August 2021, a subscription page for The Epoch Times received 44.2 million views between April and June 2021. Facebook data showed that one of the most popular pages in the first quarter of 2021 was a page run by The Epoch Times. With 9.1 million Facebook followers in November 2021, The Epoch Times exceeded the follower counts of far-right news organizations Breitbart News and Newsmax at the time.

Videos and ads from the Epoch Media Group, including The Epoch Times and New Tang Dynasty (NTD), totaled three billion views on Facebook, YouTube and Twitter in April 2019, according to the analytics company Tubular. This ranked it 11th among all video creators, and ahead of any other traditional news publisher, according to NBC News.

As of 2021, The Epoch Times was the seventh most followed account on Gab, a social networking service known for its far-right userbase.

In 2024, billboards appeared in multiple U.S. cities marketing The Epoch Times's website with the slogan "#1 Trusted News" alongside a portrait of its reporter Joshua Philipp. Local news outlets questioned the veracity of the slogan in light of The Epoch Times's history of publishing misinformation and the DOJ's indictment of its chief financial officer.

== Editorial stance ==
The Epoch Times is an ardent opponent of the Chinese Communist Party, and politically adopts ultraconservative views. Since a shift in the newspaper's approach in 2016, the newspaper received significant attention for its favorable coverage of the Trump administration, the American far-right, the German far-right, and the French far-right.

The Epoch Times says it is "independent," but other news outlets have questioned this claim.

According to NBC News, The Epoch Times "generally stayed out of U.S. politics" before 2016 "unless they dovetailed with Chinese interests." Ben Hurley, a former Falun Gong practitioner and Epoch Times writer until 2013, said the newspaper was critical of abortion and LGBT people and that Falun Gong practitioners "saw communism everywhere," including in internationalist figures like Hillary Clinton and Kofi Annan, "but there was more room for disagreements in the early days."

Since 2016, according to NBC News, The Epoch Times has promoted favorable coverage of Trump's campaign and presidency, and emphasized topics like Islamic terrorism and illegal immigration to the United States. It has also emphasized "what the publication claims is a labyrinthian, global conspiracy led by [Hillary] Clinton and former President Barack Obama to tear down Trump."

According to private statements from top Epoch Times journalists, Falun Gong founder Li directed the newspaper to increase its coverage of Trump in 2016. A former Epoch Times reporter who covered the 2016 campaign, Steve Klett, said his editors had encouraged favorable coverage of Trump after he won the Republican nomination, and that "they seemed to have this almost messianic way of viewing Trump as the anti-Communist leader who would bring about the end of the Chinese Communist Party." After Trump was elected, The Epoch Times hired Brendan Steinhauser, a Tea Party strategist, to reach out to more conservatives and encourage the Trump administration to oppose the persecution of Falun Gong.

The Epoch Times picks up mainstream newswire stories and in some places can resemble a community newspaper. According to sociologist Yuezhi Zhao, "While mainstream newspapers typically treat Web versions as an extension of the already-existing print version, The Epoch Times website serves as the master for all its worldwide papers."

The Epoch Times is known for alleging conspiracies involving former Communist Party general secretary Jiang Zemin, under whose administration Falun Gong was suppressed in China.

The newspaper is at odds with the Taiwanese-owned and U.S.-based Chinese language newspaper World Journal, calling it a "megaphone for the evil Chinese Communist Party."

In 2017, the German edition The Epoch Times Deutschland, which became online-only in 2012, was described by online magazine The China File as aligned with the German far-right, and attractive to supporters of the Alternative for Germany (AfD) party and the anti-immigrant group Pegida. Stefanie Albrecht, a reporter for the German broadcaster RTL who spent several days inside The Epoch Times's Berlin office while investigating the far right, said that the staffers she met were all Falun Gong practitioners who had no journalistic training and did not check facts, trusting instead in the alternative sources they consulted. During her time at The Epoch Times's office, Albrecht was exposed to debunked conspiracy theories such as Pizzagate, the chemtrail conspiracy theory, weather-changing machines, and the Great Replacement.

In France, The Epoch Times has given "an unfettered platform to Jean-Marie Le Pen, the patriarch of the French far right, and his daughter, Marine, who leads the nationalist party her father founded," according to The New Republic.

The Epoch Times publishes climate change denial content; independent analyses have linked such content to monetisation through Google's advertising ecosystem, which served ads alongside or on pages containing climate change denial content. It promotes doubt about modern science and medicine, in line with Falun Gong's teachings. Elise Thomas of the Institute for Strategic Dialogue noted, "Falun Gong has a history of rejecting modern medicine, which obviously intersects neatly with the beliefs of many anti-vax communities." Ben Hurley said, "They've been anti-medicine for a long time. Ex-believers know many people that have died from treatable conditions. It's their belief that they don't need medicine, because they're superhuman beings."

An NBC News article stated that during the runup to the 2020 election, the "conspiracy-fueled Epoch Times" greatly increased its reach by supporting Trump, especially "parroting his lies about the election," to become one of the most influential conservative news media outlets in the U.S. In two years, the news outlet grew its revenue by 685%.

In July 2023, Falun Gong founder Li told Epoch Times journalists that it should not favor one political party over the other. Following the allegations of money laundering by the newspaper's CFO, Li issued a statement calling on Falun Gong adherents not to attack politicians from either political party. Howard Polskin, founder of The Righting, says that this may signal the Epoch Times changing its brand. For example, the NBC News article noted that The Epoch Times did not endorse a 2024 candidate and hired mainstream news veterans not affiliated with Falun Gong.

In October 2025, a former Epoch Times reporter, Andrew Thornebrooke, stated that (contrary to most newsrooms) journalists at the newspaper are not permitted to review the final versions of their articles prior to publication. According to Thornebrooke, this practice has led to false information being inserted into articles without the knowledge of the author.

== Notable coverage ==
=== "Nine Commentaries on the Communist Party" editorials ===
In 2004, the Chinese version of The Epoch Times published a series of editorials titled "Nine Commentaries on the Communist Party". The editorials argued that China would not be free or prosperous until it was rid of the party, which it said was at odds with China's cultural and spiritual values. The Epoch Times also organized a campaign called the Tuidang movement, urging people to quit the Chinese Communist Party, and said that more than two million people had resigned. A report by the OpenNet Initiative said that 90 percent of websites mentioning the phrase "Nine Commentaries" were blocked in mainland China as of 2005.

Li Yi, a Hong Kong-based democratic activist, questioned The Epoch Times's claims about the number of resignations in an Apple Daily opinion piece in 2006, warned that the Tuidang movement could be using "lies to fight lies", and wrote that the propagandistic nature of the movement could hurt the integrity of the pro-democracy community.

Caylan Ford, a former staff writer for The Epoch Times, wrote in a 2009 guest opinion article in The Christian Science Monitor that millions of copies of the "Nine Commentaries" articles were circulated in China by email, fax, and underground printing houses. Ford wrote that the campaign differed from the 1989 and 2008 democracy movements in China by drawing on Buddhist and Daoist spirituality.

In 2012, a former People's Liberation Army Air Force officer testified to the United States Congressional-Executive Commission on China that he had been sentenced to four years of prison for distributing a "Nine Commentaries" DVD in Beijing.

The Tuidang movement was called one of the top global events in 2011 by Russian economist Andrey Illarionov, who cited claims by The Epoch Times that over 100 million people had quit.

According to China scholar David Ownby, the Nine Commentaries are a "condemnation of communism and a direct indictment of the legitimacy of the Chinese Communist Party's rule in China". While acknowledging the "unnecessary violence" the Chinese Communist Party has inflicted, Ownby finds that the lack of balance and nuance in tone and style makes the editorials resemble "anti-Communist propaganda written in Taiwan in the 1950s". Journalist Oscar Schwartz called the Nine Commentaries a "quasi-McCarthyist screed".

=== Pro-Trump conspiracy theories and disinformation ===
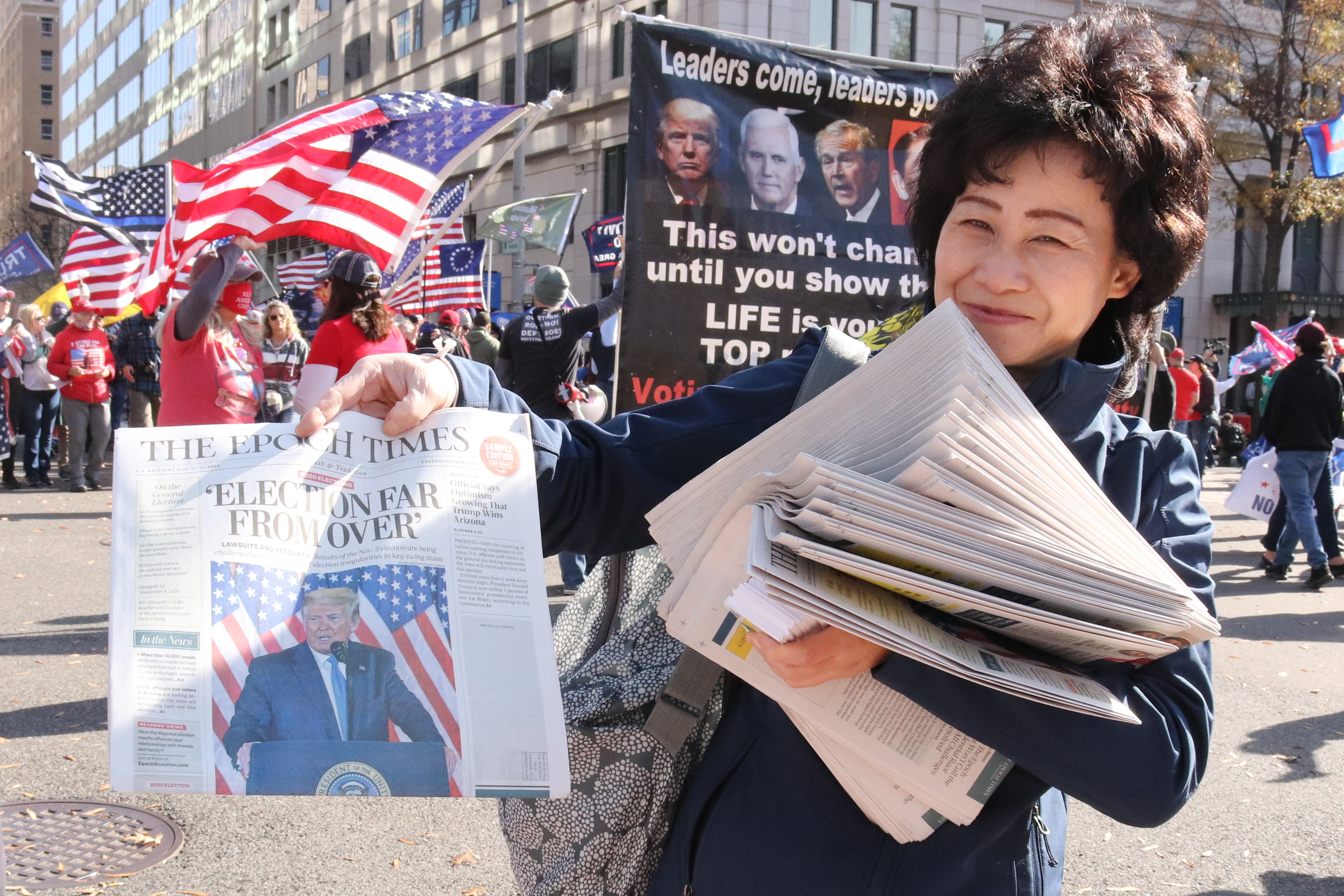
Woman at Million MAGA March on November 14, 2020, in Washington, D.C., distributing copies of The Epoch Times featuring a headline that quotes Donald Trump's disputed claim about the results of the 2020 United States presidential election

The Epoch Times has promoted an array of pro-Donald Trump conspiracy theories and is known as one of Trump's closest media allies and defenders.

The paper has financially benefited from its promotion of Trump conspiracies, increasing its revenue nearly fourfold during the first three years of Trump's administration (from $3.9 million in 2016 to $15.5 million in 2019) as it catered to Trump's most ardent supporters, to whom the paper marketed itself via targeted social media advertising.

The publication championed Trump's Spygate conspiracy theory in its news coverage and advertising, and the Epoch Media Group's Edge of Wonder videos on YouTube spread the far-right, pro-Trump QAnon conspiracy theory and embraced false QAnon claims.

An NBC News report found that two of Edge of Wonder's hosts were a creative director and chief photo editor at The Epoch Times. The newspaper promoted Edge of Wonder videos in dozens of Facebook posts through 2019.

In September 2019, during the Trump–Ukraine scandal, Hunter Biden's Wikipedia article included dubious claims about his business dealings in Ukraine and his father Joe Biden's motivations for going after a Ukrainian prosecutor; the claims were sourced to The Epoch Times and The New American. The Epoch Times promoted the conspiracy theory that Joe Biden had abused his power in 2016 to protect Hunter's business interests in Ukraine.

During the February 2020 Iowa Democratic caucuses, The Epoch Times shared viral disinformation from the conservative group Judicial Watch that falsely alleged inflated voter rolls. The disinformation, which went viral on Facebook, was debunked by fact checkers and the Iowa secretary of state. A Harvard media expert said that The Epoch Times employed a "classic disinformation tactic" known as "trading up the chain", in which false stories are repackaged and shared.

After Trump lost the 2020 United States presidential election, The Epoch Times consistently sought to question the election results. The organization produced a 93-minute video that falsely suggested widespread fraud in the counting; one interviewee, attorney Lin Wood, falsely alleged that China had bought an American election vendor. Versions of the video on YouTube, the Epoch Times website, and NTD were viewed hundreds of thousands of times.

The Epoch Times created a network of seven new YouTube channels to disseminate election disinformation and other false claims, including falsehoods about the Nashville Christmas Day bombing. Only one of the seven YouTube channels disclosed its ties to The Epoch Times or Falun Gong. In the two and a half months after their creation, the disinformation channels garnered tens of millions of views and at least 1.1 million subscribers.

One of the channels ("Eye Opener With Michael Lewis") portrays itself as an independent effort by the host "and a few friends". After the videos' false and misleading claims were reported, YouTube removed several of the videos in accordance with the site's policy against election disinformation.

The newspaper helped publicize the January 6, 2021, Trump rally in Washington, D.C., that led to the storming of the Capitol by a violent pro-Trump mob. Afterward, one of its columnists suggested that the riot was a "false flag" operation, and Michael Lewis's Epoch Times-linked YouTube channel echoed the same lie, suggesting that the Capitol attack was orchestrated by "antifa" as part of an "old Communist tactic".

=== COVID-19 coverage and misinformation ===
The Epoch Times has spread misinformation related to the COVID-19 pandemic in print and via social media including Facebook and YouTube. In 2022, Raquel Miguel of the European watchdog EU DisinfoLab said, "The Epoch Times has played a noticeable role in transmitting and amplifying many anti-vaccine narratives". According to Josef Holnburger of the Center for Monitoring, Analysis and Strategy, a German extremism monitoring agency, The Epoch Times's German edition has been the most shared outlet among Germany's COVID-skeptic movement.

It has promoted anti-CCP rhetoric and conspiracy theories about the pandemic, for example through an eight-page special edition called "How the Chinese Communist Party Endangered the World", which was distributed unsolicited in April 2020 to mail customers in the United States, Canada, and Australia, and in June 2020 in the United Kingdom.

In the newspaper, the SARS-CoV-2 virus is known as the "CCP virus", and a commentary in the newspaper posed the question, "is the novel coronavirus outbreak in Wuhan an accident occasioned by weaponizing the virus at that [Wuhan P4 virology] lab?" The newspaper's editorial board suggested that COVID-19 patients cure themselves by "condemning the CCP" and "maybe a miracle will happen".

In France, "special" French-language print editions of The Epoch Times were distributed in 2021 during anti-Health pass protests. In Germany, The Epoch Times has published articles blasting the legitimacy of PCR tests and promoting conspiracy theories about vaccination mishaps.

A February 2020 Epoch Times story shared a map from the internet that falsely alleged massive sulfur dioxide releases from crematoria during the COVID-19 pandemic in China, speculating that 14,000 bodies may have been burned. A fact check by AFP reported that the map was a NASA forecast taken out of context.

A widely viewed video released by The Epoch Times on April 7, 2020, was flagged by Facebook as "partly false" for "the unsupported hypothesis that SARS-CoV-2 is a bioengineered virus released from a Wuhan research laboratory". The video featured Judy Mikovits, an anti-vaccination activist. The fact-checker Health Feedback said of the video that "several of its core scientific claims are false and its facts, even when accurate, are often presented in a misleading way". The video was a 54-minute feature on Joshua Philipp's Crossroads EpochTV series.

In April 2020, a Canadian Broadcasting Corporation (CBC) story reported that some Canadians were upset to receive a special edition of The Epoch Times that called COVID-19 the "CCP virus". The CBC later retracted a headline on its story that had quoted a recipient saying the special edition was "racist and inflammatory", and the CBC also retracted a claim that The Epoch Times edition had concluded that COVID-19 was a bioweapon. Opinion columns published by conservative tabloid The Toronto Sun accused the CBC of bias against The Epoch Times and said the CBC's report may have misled readers into thinking The Epoch Times was spreading anti-Asian sentiment.

In February 2021, an investigator for EU DisinfoLab found that Tierra Pura, a Spanish-language website first launched in Argentina in March 2020 that publishes COVID-19 misinformation, is closely linked to The Epoch Times and Falun Gong. At the time, the site was the most shared outlet in Spain's COVID-19-skeptic Telegram channels and groups. The Epoch Times and Tierra Pura denied being linked.

In January 2022, the German edition of The Epoch Times amplified accusations by German activist Steffen Löhnitz that the Austrian government had deliberately inflated infection numbers to justify a lockdown. It said Löhnitz had been digging up "correct numbers" and reported his claims of "massive fraud" as fact. The Epoch Times story was shared by figures from Querdenken, Germany's anti-lockdown movement.

=== Human rights coverage ===
Some scholars have described The Epoch Times as having a particular focus on human rights coverage, especially concerning China and the persecution of Falun Gong.

In 2006, The Epoch Times provided an online forum for a hunger-strike campaign by Chinese human rights defenders. According to the Congressional-Executive Commission on China, it also published a proposal by Chinese human rights lawyer Gao Zhisheng condemning government oppression, as well as his essays on the disappearance of other activists and responses to escalating government repression.

In 2006, the first allegations of organ harvesting from Falun Gong practitioners in China were reported in The Epoch Times, followed by the investigative report Bloody Harvest by Canadian human rights lawyer David Matas and former Canadian lawmaker David Kilgour. In 2013, The Epoch Times received a Sigma Delta Chi Award from the Society of Professional Journalists for its reporting on alleged forced organ harvesting in China.

According to the Committee to Protect Journalists, The Epoch Times' coverage in Nigeria often includes reporting on religious and ethnic minorities. In 2021, its reporter in Nigeria, Luka Binniyat, was detained after reporting on violence against Christians in Kaduna State. Reporters Without Borders characterized his detention as arbitrary, and the U.S. Commission on International Religious Freedom said he was detained for reporting on religious groups and religious freedom conditions.

=== Other ===
In 2010, the newspaper ran an interview with Canadian Conservative Member of Parliament Rob Anders wherein Anders alleged that the Chinese government used gifts and business deals in attempts to influence Canadian political decisions.

The Epoch Times published a web series with conservative commentator Larry Elder, a candidate in the 2021 recall election against California governor Gavin Newsom. Elder hosted "The Larry Elder Show" three times a week, covering Republican politics and other issues.

== Social media activity and bans ==
=== Ads banned by Facebook and YouTube ===
The Epoch Media Group spent $11 million on Facebook ads in 2019, including, over a six-month period in 2019, more than $1.5 million on about 11,000 pro-Trump Facebook advertisements purchased by The Epoch Times. According to publicly available Facebook ad data reported by NBC News, The Epoch Times spent more on pro-Trump ads than any group except the Trump campaign itself.

Political ad spending on Facebook in April 2019 through an account called "Coverage of the Trump Presidency by The Epoch Times" exceeded any politician's spending except Trump's and Joe Biden's. Journalist Judd Legum wrote in May 2019 that The Epoch Times ads were "boosting Donald Trump and floating conspiracy theories about Joe Biden".

In August 2019, Facebook banned The Epoch Times from advertising on its platform after finding that the newspaper broke its political transparency rules by publishing pro-Trump subscription ads through sockpuppet pages such as "Honest Paper" and "Pure American Journalism". A Facebook representative told NBC: "Over the past year we removed accounts associated with The Epoch Times for violating our ad policies, including trying to get around our review systems."

The Epoch Times publisher Stephen Gregory wrote in response that the newspaper did not intend to violate Facebook's rules and that its video ads were advertisements for subscriptions to the newspaper.

After Facebook banned it from advertising, the newspaper shifted its spending to YouTube, where it has spent more than $1.8 million on ads, some promoting conspiracy theories, since May 2018. YouTube demonetized Edge of Wonder, a program of the Epoch Media Group, on its platform, and removed Epoch Times ads relating to COVID-19.

=== Removal of The Beauty of Life from Facebook ===
In October 2019, the fact-checking website Snopes reported close links between The Epoch Times and a large network of Facebook pages and groups called The BL (The Beauty of Life) that shared pro-Trump views and conspiracy theories such as QAnon. At that time, The BL had spent at least $510,698 on Facebook advertising. Hundreds of the ads were removed for violations of Facebook's advertising rules. By December 2019, the BL network of pages had 28 million Facebook followers, according to Snopes.

The editor-in-chief of The BL had previously worked as editor-in-chief of The Epoch Times, and several other BL employees were listed as current or former Epoch Times employees. The BL was registered in Middletown, New York, to an address that also was registered to Falun Gong's Sound of Hope radio network and was associated with the YouTube series Beyond Science, and Snopes found "the outlet as a whole is literally the English-language edition of Epoch Times Vietnam". Snopes also found that The BL was using more than 300 fake Facebook profiles based in Vietnam and other countries, using names, stock photos and celebrity photos in their profiles to emulate Americans, to administer more than 150 pro-Trump Facebook groups amplifying its content.

The Epoch Times and The BL denied being affiliated with each other, although the latter acknowledged that a "few of our staff" previously worked for The Epoch Times.

In December 2019, Facebook announced it had removed a large network of accounts, pages, and groups linked to The BL and Epoch Media Group for coordinated inauthentic behavior on behalf of a foreign actor. The network had 55 million followers on Facebook and Instagram, and $9.5 million had been spent on Facebook ads through its accounts.

The New York Times reported that The BL had used fake profile photos generated by artificial intelligence. The Atlantic Council Digital Forensic Research Lab director Graham Brookie said the coordinated network of fake accounts demonstrated "an eerie, tech-enabled future of disinformation". Facebook's head of security policy, Nathaniel Gleicher, said, "What's new here is that this is purportedly a U.S.-based media company leveraging foreign actors posing as Americans to push political content. We've seen it a lot with state actors in the past."

In August 2020, Snopes reported that The BL had evaded Facebook's link ban by creating a clone named The Lion in July of that year. Facebook placed a link ban on The Lion after Snopes contacted it.

=== Removal of TruthMedia from Facebook ===
In August 2020, Facebook removed hundreds of fake accounts by a digital company called TruthMedia that promoted Epoch Times and NTD content and pro-Trump conspiracy theories about COVID-19 and protests in the United States. The operation included 303 Facebook accounts, 181 pages, 44 Facebook groups, and 31 Instagram accounts, which in total were followed by more than two million people. Snopes and NBC News reported that TruthMedia had ties to the Epoch Media Group, but Stephen Gregory, publisher of The Epoch Times, denied this.

TruthMedia, now banned from Facebook, continues to operate YouTube channels in Chinese, English, Japanese, and Vietnamese, and has accounts on Pinterest and Twitter. It appears to have begun a petition to the White House to "start calling the novel coronavirus the CCP virus".

=== SafeChat ===
In March 2021, Politico reported that SafeChat, a social media platform rife with disinformation and conspiracy theories about President Joe Biden that is popular with Trump supporters and Chinese dissidents, was closely linked to The Epoch Times and Falun Gong.

== Censorship ==
=== By the Chinese government ===
In some cases The Epoch Times operates in a hostile overseas environment, in which "overseas Chinese media companies choosing to remain independent or publish non-approved content become the targets of an aggressive campaign of elimination or control". In one instance, Chinese diplomatic officials made threats against media for reporting Falun Gong-related content; in other cases, advertisers and distributors have been threatened for supporting The Epoch Times. Communist Party authorities have been accused of resorting to "militant methods" against the paper and its staff, including attacking staff and destroying computer equipment.

In 2006, the International Federation of Journalists criticized what it called a "dirty war" against The Epoch Times, citing incidents such as The Epoch Times's Hong Kong printing plant being broken into and damaged by unidentified men, and The Epoch Times's offices in Sydney and Toronto receiving suspicious mail envelopes suspected of containing toxic materials. The IFJ also noted incidences of Epoch Times staff and advertisers being intimidated, and newspapers being confiscated, in what it characterized as "a vicious witch-hunt aimed at crushing the voice of dissent".

The newspaper was briefly banned from Malaysia after coming under reported pressure by the Chinese Communist Party.

In 2010, the Brisbane office of the Epoch Times was targeted in a drive-by shooting by two assailants with an air rifle. A projectile was fired through the front window of the office.

In 2016, the newspaper was removed from the pharmacy of Australian National University after the president of the Chinese Students and Scholars Association confronted the pharmacist and threw out the papers. The incident drew national media coverage over questions of Chinese government-sponsored overseas student organizations.

In November 2019, Reporters Without Borders called on Hong Kong Chief Executive Carrie Lam to protect press freedoms after The Epoch Times said four masked arsonists with batons had damaged its printing press. Additionally, in a 2019 report, Reporters Without Borders said that The Epoch Times's chief technical officer, Li Yuan, was assaulted in his Atlanta, Georgia, home on February 8, 2006, by "suspected Chinese government agents" who took his two laptops.

In April 2021, the Hong Kong printing facility was vandalized during working hours, in the presence of staff members. Masked men forced staffers to leave by threatening them with hammers and a knife, and proceeded to smash the office's computers, douse the printing machines with concrete mix, and steal computer parts. The attack was captured by CCTV.

In May 2021, Epoch Times reporter Leung Zhen was attacked by a man wielding a baseball bat from a passing vehicle. She accused the Chinese Communist Party of orchestrating the attack.

The 2022 film Doctor Strange in the Multiverse of Madness was blocked from release in China after the film was submitted for review and footage that made reference to The Epoch Times was found.

The Hong Kong print edition of the newspaper ceased publication after September 17, 2024, due to the expiration of its printer's contract which could not be renewed.

=== By Russia ===
In 2026, newspaper was designated as an undesirable organization in Russia.

== White House controversies ==
In 2006, a reporter with temporary Epoch Times press credentials unfurled a protest banner and heckled China's leader Hu Jintao at a summit with President George W. Bush, shouting, "Stop him from killing!" and "Evil people will die early," prompting Chinese officials to refuse to attend a ceremonial lunch in protest. The Epoch Times later disassociated itself from the reporter.

In September 2018, Epoch Times photographer Samira Bouaou broke White House protocol and handed President Trump a folder. In August 2020, the White House Correspondents' Association objected to the Trump administration's bending of COVID-19 social distancing rules in press briefings to favor The Epoch Times, The Gateway Pundit, and One America News Network.

== Assessments ==
Ming Xia, a political science professor at the Graduate Center of the City University of New York, wrote in 2007 that The Epoch Times represents part of Falun Gong's strategic effort to expand to non-practitioners, and "embed itself into the large civil society for influence and legitimacy". In 2018, he stated that The Epoch Times staff "are not professional journalists and do not follow the protocols professional journalists abide by."

In his 2008 book on Falun Gong, China historian David Ownby wrote that The Epoch Times articles are "well written and interesting, if occasionally idiosyncratic in their coverage." According to Ownby, the newspaper has been praised and also criticized for a perceived bias against the CCP, and support of Falun Gong practitioners and other dissidents such as Tibetans, Taiwanese independence advocates, democracy activists, Uyghurs, and others. The newspaper is therefore often assessed in light of its connection to Falun Gong, rather than a thorough analysis of its editorial content.

The Epoch Times has been criticized by some scholars for biases, particularly regarding the Chinese Communist Party and mainland China issues, as well as for being a "mouthpiece" of the Falun Gong movement. James To, a New Zealand political scientist, described The Epoch Times as the "primary mouthpiece" of Falun Gong, writing that it "lacks credibility", despite the newspaper posing a "viable threat to the CCP" by publishing articles about the party's negative aspects.

In his book Blocked on Weibo: What Gets Suppressed on China's Version of Twitter and Why, University of Toronto research fellow Jason Q. Ng referred to the newspaper's coverage of mainland China issues as "heavily biased against the Communist Party" and thus its reportage "should be viewed skeptically."

A 2018 report by the Hoover Institution, a conservative think tank, called The Epoch Times one of the few independent Chinese-language media outlets in the U.S. not taken over by businessmen sympathetic to the Chinese government and one that remains "independent of PRC control." The report also said that reports on China by The Epoch Times and other outlets affiliated with Falun Gong, which is banned from China, are "uneven."

In his 2019 book, Becoming Activists in Global China: Social Movements in the Chinese Diaspora, sociologist Andrew Junker argued that "simply by increasing the plurality of voices in the diaspora Chinese-language public sphere," The Epoch Times was "playing a progressive role" despite the Falun Gong community's "pariah status" limiting the publication's influence.

Seth Hettena wrote in The New Republic that The Epoch Times "has built a global propaganda machine, similar to Russia's Sputnik or RT, that pushes a mix of alternative facts and conspiracy theories that has won it far-right acolytes around the world."

Joan Donovan of the Shorenstein Center on Media, Politics and Public Policy at Harvard University called The Epoch Times "a known disinformation operation." Jennifer Grygiel, an associate professor of communication at Syracuse University's S. I. Newhouse School of Public Communications, said that The Epoch Times is "a notorious outlet that has been known to spread disinformation and misinformation."

James Bettinger, a professor of communications at Stanford University and the director of the John S. Knight Journalism Fellowships, said "Even if Epoch Times is not associated with Falun Gong, if they consistently write about Falun Gong in the same perspective, or if there are no articles examining Falun Gong, people would perceive it as being not credible." Orville Schell, dean of the Graduate School of Journalism at University of California, Berkeley, said in 2005 that "It's hard to vouch for their quality because it's difficult to corroborate, but it's not something to be dismissed as pure propaganda."

Jiao Guobiao, a former Beijing University journalism professor who was dismissed after criticizing the CCP propaganda department, proposed that even if The Epoch Times published only negative information highly critical of the CCP, its attacks could never begin to counterbalance the propaganda the party publishes about itself. In addressing media balance, Jiao noted that the Chinese public lacked negative, critical information about their country. As such, he noted for a need of media balance based on the principles of freedom, equality, and legality, and that media balance "is the result of the collective imbalances of all."

Haifeng Huang, professor of political science at the University of California, said, "I'm not exactly clear why they have become such a major pro-Trump voice," but "part of it is perhaps because they regard President Trump as tough on the Chinese government and therefore a natural ally for them."

The web-only German edition of the newspaper, The Epoch Times Deutschland, has aligned with the anti-immigration far-right in Germany, favorably commenting on Alternative for Germany and Pegida while criticizing mainstream German media as untrustworthy. Bethany Allen-Ebrahimian of Foreign Policy writes that "It's not clear why the German website of a Falun Gong newspaper would choose to promote right-wing populism in Germany," but that the decision could be a business decision to drive an increase in views of the publication, or because such views reflect the teaching of Falun Gong leader Li Hongzhi, "who believes that mixed-race children are 'pitiable' and 'physically and intellectually incomplete.'"

A German media report described the outlet as a "favorite" of Pegida supporters, along with Sputnik News and Kopp Report, and found that its articles critical of immigration have been shared almost daily.

A report by the Institute for Strategic Dialogue, a London-based think tank, said the German edition of The Epoch Times "primarily runs anti-West, anti-American and pro-Kremlin content—a high proportion of this content is based on unverified information."

In December 2019, the English Wikipedia deprecated the English and Chinese online versions of The Epoch Times as an "unreliable source" to use as a reference in Wikipedia, with editors calling it "an advocacy group for the Falun Gong, and [...] a biased or opinionated source that frequently publishes conspiracy theories."

In March 2022, Angelo Carusone, head of watchdog group Media Matters for America, said that The Epoch Times "go[es] where the center for the strongest infrastructure or possibility of getting as much audience and influence and reach is," and added that this complexity makes it "radically different and hard to understand." According to Carusone, the metric of success for The Epoch Times is simply influence rather than money or a specific political agenda.

== Litigation ==
The Epoch Times and its co-founder Dana Cheng sued Maine Beacon reporter Dan Neumann for defamation after Neumann reported on Cheng's promotion of conspiracy theories about the January 6 Capitol attack in June 2021. In October 2022, the newspaper lost an effort to revive the lawsuit, with the judges finding that the alleged defamatory reporting was substantially true.

In 2024, Weidong “Bill” Guan, chief financial officer of The Epoch Times, was arrested and charged with leading a transnational scheme to launder approximately $67 million in illicit funds through cryptocurrency, prepaid debit cards, fraudulently obtained unemployment benefits, and stolen personal information. Prosecutors alleged that the scheme contributed to a sharp increase in the newspaper’s reported revenue, and The Epoch Times suspended Guan following his arrest. In 2026, Guan pleaded guilty in Manhattan federal court. He also agreed to forfeit at least $67 million, representing property involved in the offense, and separately to pay restitution up to $67 million.

== Awards ==
In 2014, the newspaper's reporting won several journalism awards, which The New York Times later described as indicative of The Epoch Times "edging closer to Mr. Li's vision of a respectable news outlet," before it changed course in 2015 and 2016 to focus on viral content and a "Trump pivot."

In 2025, The Epoch Times won the Religion Communicators Council's Wilbur Award for its communication of religious issues, values, and themes as a secular media outlet.

== See also ==
- New Tang Dynasty Television
- The Washington Times
