= Bill Ready =

American technology executive

- Born: 1979 (age 46–47)
- Education: University of Louisville (BS); Harvard Business School (MBA)
- Occupation: Businessman
- Title: CEO of Pinterest
- Board member of: Pinterest; Visa; Williams-Sonoma, Inc.

William J. Ready (born 1979) is an American technology executive. Since June 2022, he has been the chief executive officer (CEO) of Pinterest, the visual search and discovery platform, and a member of the board of directors. He is also on the boards of Visa, and Williams-Sonoma, Inc. During his tenure as Pinterest's CEO, its user base has grown while its valuation has experienced volatility and remained flat. The company has expanded initiatives related to online safety and promoting positive user experiences.

Prior to Pinterest, Ready was president of commerce, payments and next billion users (emerging markets) at Google from 2020 to 2022. Before Google, he was chief operating officer of PayPal, and CEO of Venmo and Braintree, leading both startups from pre-revenue to billions of dollars in revenue and through their acquisition by PayPal.

Ready has played a significant role in advancing digital payments, financial technology and commerce. He has also been an advocate for youth online safety and responsible technology policies.

== Early life and education ==
Bill Ready grew up in Elizabethtown, Kentucky and worked as a mechanic at his parents' auto repair business from the age of 13. He graduated as valedictorian at University of Louisville where he earned a Bachelor of Science in information systems and finance. Ready then went on to earn an MBA from Harvard Business School.

== Career ==
Early in his career, Ready was a strategy consultant for McKinsey & Company, where he advised financial technology companies. Later, Ready was an executive in residence at Accel Partners, a venture capital firm. He also was the president of iPay Technologies and an early engineer at two more startups, Emphesys and Netzee.

=== Braintree and Venmo ===
Ready served as CEO of Braintree from its early development stage through its acquisition by PayPal in September 2013, overseeing the company's growth in mobile payment services and expansion into a multi-billion dollar revenue business. He led the build of Braintree's first native mobile payment APIs and its acquisition of Venmo in 2012 when Venmo was still in beta and had fewer than 3,000 users. In 2012, under his leadership, Braintree acquired Venmo positioning the company as a leader in peer-to-peer payment offerings and increasing its presence within the financial technology sector.

=== PayPal ===
In 2013, Ready joined PayPal when its then-parent company, eBay Inc., acquired Ready's startup, Braintree Payments Solutions LLC. After the acquisition, Ready continued as CEO of both Braintree and Venmo. He later led PayPal's global product and engineering organization overseeing the development and expansion of products.

In October 2016, Ready was appointed PayPal's chief operating officer (COO). In this role, he was responsible for product, technology, engineering, and end-to-end customer experiences for PayPal's consumer, merchant, Braintree, Venmo, Paydiant, and Xoom businesses. He also was the co-chair of PayPal's Operating Group with responsibility for the full profit and loss of the company.

Ready served as PayPal's COO until 2019, during which time the company expanded its digital payments and financial technology operations, before his departure to join Google.

=== Google ===
In January 2020, Ready joined Google as the company's new President of Commerce, Payments and Next Billion users. During his tenure, he led strategies to extend digital commerce offerings and supported the company's efforts to reach a broader global user base. He worked in this role until he joined Pinterest.

=== Pinterest ===
In June 2022, Pinterest announced the appointment of Ready as its new CEO, succeeding company co-founder, Ben Silbermann. Under Ready, Pinterest's valuation doubled to approximately $28 billion in 2024. As of January 2026, Pinterest's valuation has dropped below $15 billion. During his time as CEO, Ready has been an advocate for advancing online safety and addressing harmful effects of social media. He has advocated for phone-free schools, digital IDs for age-verification purposes, and youth online safety overall.

== Personal life ==
Ready lives in California with his wife and daughter.
