= The Yes =

Women's Retail Fashion Platform

THE YES
- Industry: Fashion, retail
- Founded: 2018; 8 years ago
- Founders: Julie Bornstein; Amit Aggarwal
- Headquarters: San Francisco; New York City, United States
- Owner: Pinterest, Inc. (2022-present)
- Website: https://www.theyes.com

THE YES is a retail app and platform that focuses on women's fashion and clothing. Its algorithms analyze user data in order to optimize product personalization. THE YES has headquarters in New York City and Silicon Valley, California.

On June 10, 2022, THE YES was acquired by Pinterest, Inc.

== History ==
THE YES was founded in 2018 by former Stitch Fix COO Julie Bornstein and Amit Aggarwal, formerly of Bloomreach. The app began development in 2018 and was released in May 2020.

At launch, THE YES was the first app to use Apple's App Clips in iOS 14.

Although THE YES originally started out as an app, in 2021 the company also launched the same functionality on their website.

In 2025, cofounder Julie Bornstein launched Daydream, an AI-powered fashion shopping platform.

== Description ==
The Yes uses AI technology to curate a feed of fashion product recommendations based on a user's individual preferences. Upon downloading the app, users will be asked a series of questions to determine their aesthetic preferences. These include questions about preferred brands, colors, styles, and sizes. Users can also vote "yes" or "no" to signify whether they like a product being shown. The platform's algorithms tailor recommendations based on this information.

In 2021, The Yes started allowing users to invite friends to view their liked items and provide feedback via emojis.

The Yes has more than 250 brands, 40 of which are plus-size. The Yes has brands such as Prada, Ralph Lauren, Levi's, Bottega Veneta, and Zara.

The Yes offers price matching and price filtering, but does not use traditional shopping filters.
