= Clipix =

Online organizational tool

Clipix.com
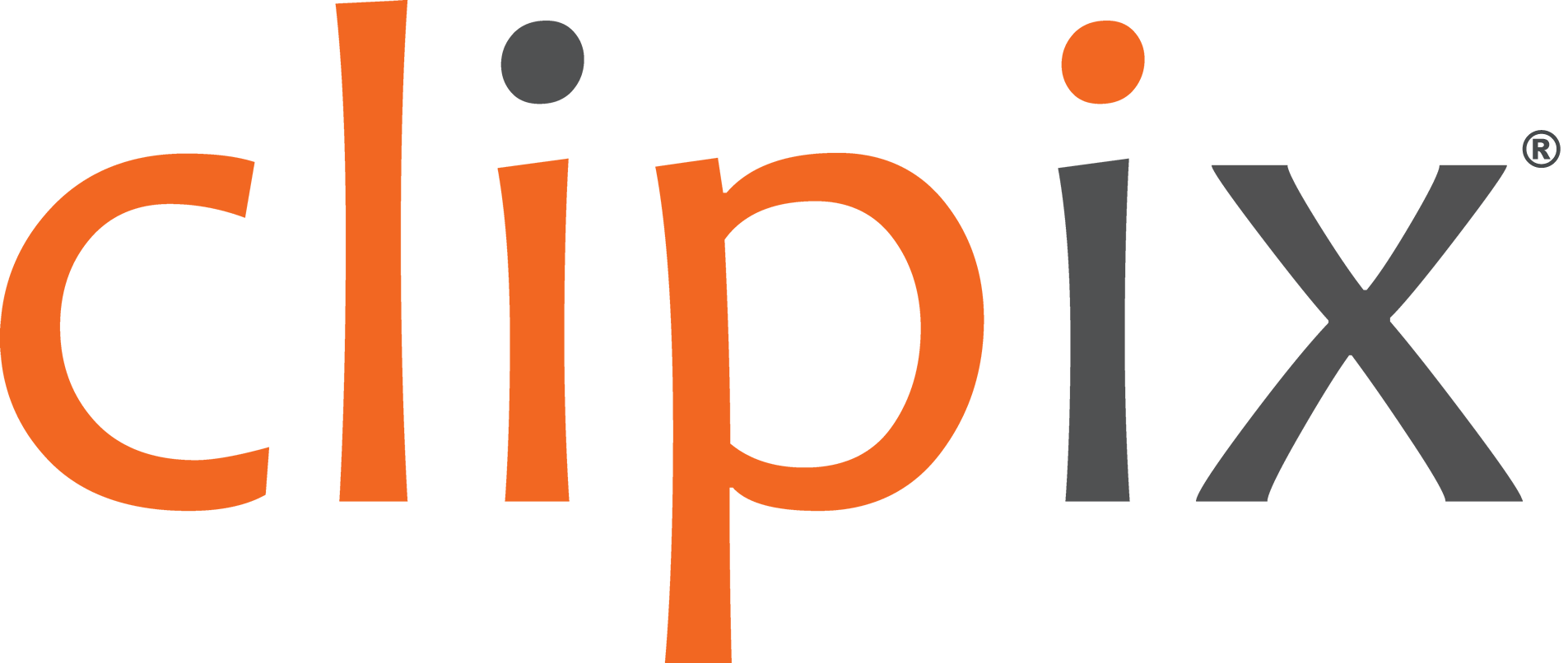
- Available in: English, French, German, Italian, Japanese, Korean, Portuguese, Russian, Spanish, Turkish, Chinese, Hebrew, Arabic
- Founder: Oded Berkowitz
- Parent: Clipix LLC
- Website: www.clipix.com
- Launched: February 2012; 14 years ago

Clipix is a privately funded company offering an online bookmarking, file sharing, and organizational tool. The utility is available in 13 languages, and as of 2014 had users in 154 countries. Clipix allows users to save online content and other documents to private or public "clipboards." By dragging a “clip” button onto the browser bar, users click and clip online items for later reference. Clipix users can also add digital files they want to access, including Excel spreadsheets, Microsoft Word documents, PDF files, and email messages. To organize content further, Clipix also offers "multiboards", which are created by dragging several clipboards into one "Main Category" clipboard. Syncboards are synchronized clipboards that multiple users can access and add to, in order to work collaboratively. The company’s "Price Drop Alert" allows users to name the price they’d like to pay for any item that is sold online. Once a "Price Drop Alert" is set, Clipix notifies the user when an item has been discounted to his or her preferred price. The Clipix app for iPad, iPhone, and Android synchronizes with the Clipix web interface.

Clipix is often compared to Pinterest, a similar tool.
