= Evan Sharp =

American Internet entrepreneur

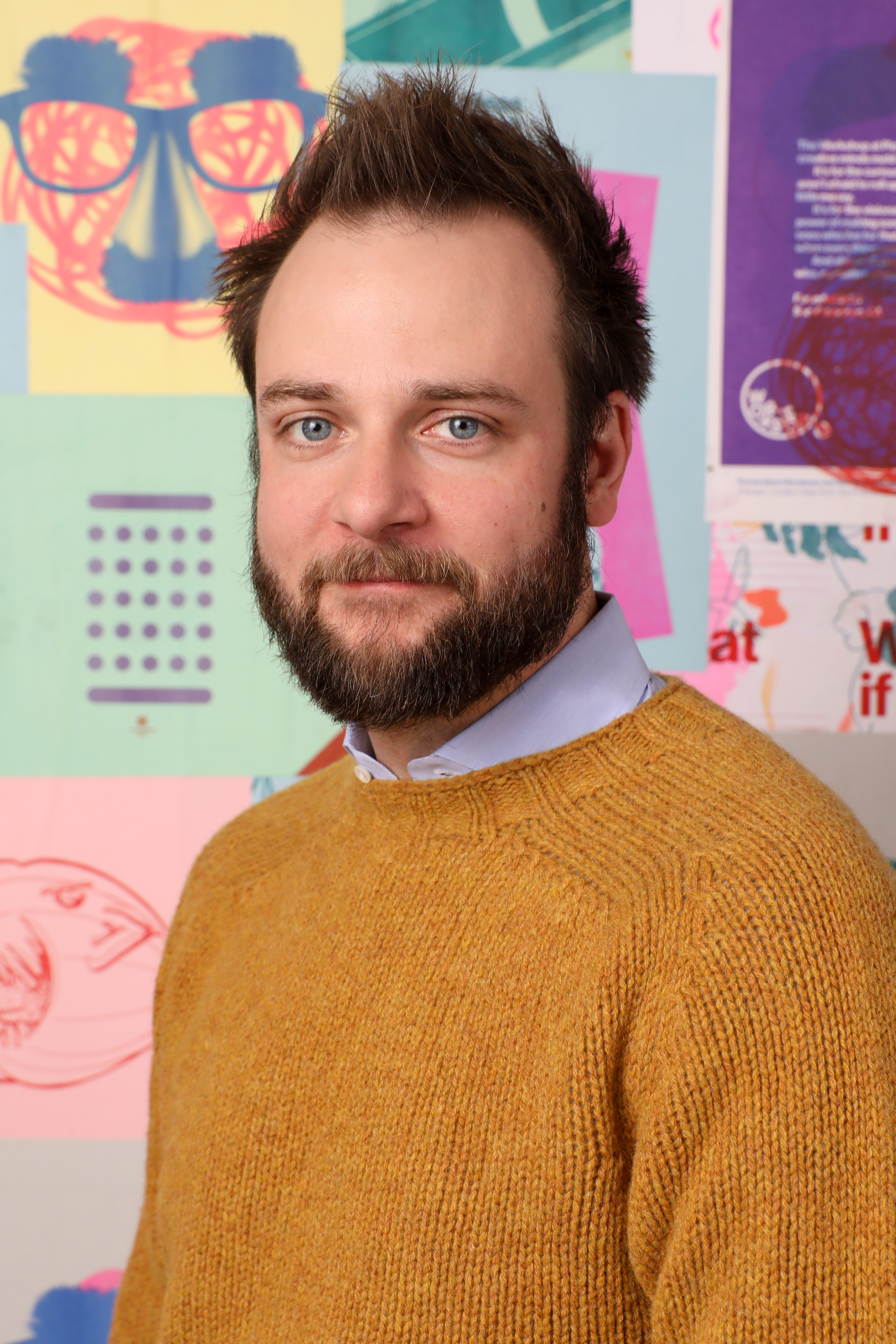
- Sharp in 2019
- Born: 1982 (age 43–44); Philadelphia, Pennsylvania, US
- Education: University of Chicago (BA); Columbia University
- Known for: Co-founder and Chief Design & Creative Officer, Pinterest
- Spouse: Christina McBride

Evan Sharp (born 1982) is an American billionaire Internet entrepreneur. He is the co-founder and chief design and creative officer of Pinterest, a visual discovery engine. He joined the company's board of directors in March 2019.

== Early life ==
Sharp was born in 1982. He was raised in York, Pennsylvania and attended York Suburban School District. Both his parents were park rangers. His father was an enthusiastic computer hobbyist. As a child, Sharp spent a lot of time tinkering with his father's Macintosh and taught himself how to code.

Sharp attended York Suburban High School where he graduated in 2001. During his high school years, he spent his free time creating icons and user interfaces.

He graduated from the University of Chicago, where he earned a bachelor's degree in history. He subsequently studied architecture at Columbia Graduate School of Architecture, Planning and Preservation.

== Career ==
Sharp met Ben Silbermann in New York through a mutual acquaintance in 2009, and they immediately formed a connection over their shared passion for the internet. Together with third cofounder Paul Sciarra, the three built the very first version of Pinterest from a small apartment in New York City on West 103rd Street. He soon thereafter moved to California, where he worked as a product designer at Facebook for about a year as his day job while working on Pinterest during the evenings.

The first desktop version of Pinterest was launched in March 2010 from a makeshift office — a two-bedroom apartment in the heart of Palo Alto that they shared with another start-up.

Sharp is credited with designing and coding Pinterest and the Pinterest grid for the initial product launch in March 2010. Over the years, he has overseen the creative, product and design teams

On October 14, 2021, Pinterest announced that Sharp would leave his post as a chief design & creative officer at the company to join LoveFrom. Sharp will reportedly stay on Pinterest's board of directors and serve as the company's advisory.

== Honors and awards ==
In 2018, Jony Ive, British industrial designer and outgoing chief design officer (CDO) of Apple, chose Sharp as the figure in technology he believes will change the future. Interviewed by Wired Magazine, Ive said about Sharp: “He understands that complex problems can be simplified and often resolved visually. Nuance and subtlety characterize his work. He doesn’t just address a functional imperative.”

Sharp was named one of the most creative people in business by Fast Company in 2014.

== Personal life ==
Sharp married Christina McBride in 2014. He resides in San Francisco, California. According to Forbes, he is worth an estimated $1 billion as of 2018.
