= China Uncensored =

Commentary program focused on China

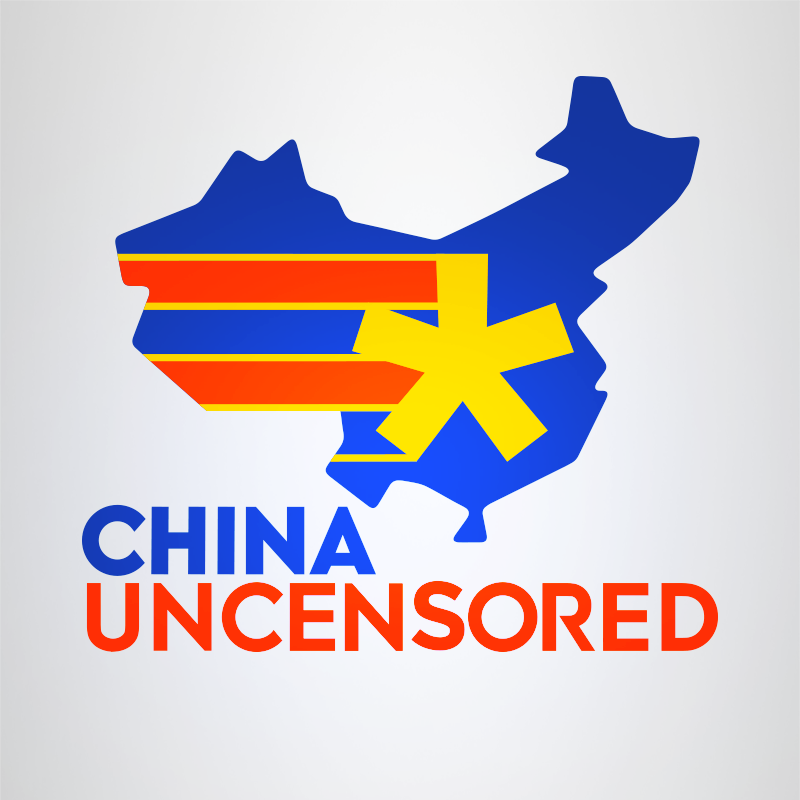
- Genre: Politics, News, Anti-censorship, Anti–Chinese Communist Party, Anti–left-wing politics
- Presented by: Chris Chappell
- Country of origin: United States
- Original language: English

Production
- Production location: New York City
- Production company: America Uncovered LLC

Original release
- Release: 2012 – present

China Uncensored

YouTube information
- Channel: China Uncensored
- Genre: News
- Subscribers: 2.15 million
- Views: 631 million
- Last updated: October 27, 2026

China Uncensored is a YouTube commentary channel focusing on political issues in China with elements of humor and irony. The show opposes the Chinese Communist Party (CCP) and the American Left. American pundit Chris Chappell is the host of the series.

Until 2020, the YouTube show was compiled into longer 30-minute episodes aired by New York City–based New Tang Dynasty Television, which is affiliated with Falun Gong, a new religious movement banned in China. NTD added Chinese subtitles to these longer episodes and broadcast them in mainland China. Vox has described the show as an affiliate of "The Epoch Times's media empire".

China Uncensored is owned and produced by America Uncovered LLC, a New York City–based company owned by Chris Chappell and his co-hosts, who also produce the YouTube show America Uncovered and the podcast China Unscripted.

In April 2017, Apple TV temporarily blocked China Uncensored in mainland China, citing local laws, as well as the Chinese Special Administrative Region of Hong Kong and in Taiwan. The app was restored in Taiwan and Hong Kong after a petition gained more than 10,000 signatures, according to China Uncensored. According to Reporters Without Borders, the show was restored to all three areas.

== Personnel ==
Chris Chappell is the primary host of the show. He told The Daily Dot that he became interested in Chinese culture at age 19 when he became ill and hospitalized. He told The Daily Dot that "the doctors said I might have some rare heart virus", but after a friend introduced him to qigong, he "got better the next day" after practicing. Regarding the creation of China Uncensored, he said: "I was a China news reporter and, eventually, I grew tired of the unbiased attitude you had to have as an unbiased reporter. I thought: 'Why not follow in the footsteps of The Daily Show or The Colbert Report?'"

Matt Gnaizda serves as the series producer and has substituted for Chappell as the series' host. Shelley Zhang is the program's "humor ninja" and also a co-host.
