= Maine Beacon =

Maine Beacon is a left-wing news organization based in Maine. It is the online news publication of the Maine People’s Alliance, which says it promotes a "progressive worldview" for activist movements. An alternative to the right-wing Maine Wire, Maine Beacon also publishes a podcast, reaching an anti-Trump audience. As of 2023, it is part of the States Newsroom network.

Maine Beacon focuses primarily on economic issues. As of 2018, Maine Beacon promoted itself as the most shared political website in the state, especially on Facebook. In February 2020, the website reported that Maine loses $52 million annually to corporations using offshore tax havens.
