= Pinterest =

American social media platform

Pinterest, Inc.
- Logo used since 2017

- Screenshot The default page shown to logged-out users (the background montage images are variable)
- Company type: Public
- Website type: Social media service
- Traded as: NYSE: PINS (Class A); S&P 400 component
- Founded: December 2009; 16 years ago
- Headquarters: San Francisco, California, U.S.
- Founders: Ben Silbermann; Paul Sciarra; Evan Sharp
- Key people: Bill Ready (CEO); Ben Silbermann (Executive chairman)
- Industry: Internet
- Revenue: ▲US$4.22 billion (2025)
- Net income: ▼US$417 million (2025)
- Employees: 4,666 (2024)
- Website: pinterest.com
- Users: 553 million MAU (2024)

Pinterest is an American social media service for publishing and discovery of information in the form of digital pinboards. This includes recipes, home, style, motivation, and inspiration on the Internet using image sharing. Pinterest, Inc. was founded by Ben Silbermann, Paul Sciarra, and Evan Sharp, and is headquartered in San Francisco.

== History ==
Pinterest emerged from an earlier app created by Ben Silbermann and Paul Sciarra called Tote which served as a virtual replacement for paper catalogs. Tote struggled as a business, significantly due to difficulties with mobile payments. At the time, mobile payment technology was not sophisticated enough to enable easy on-the-go transactions, inhibiting users from making many purchases via the app. Tote users however were amassing large collections of favorite items and sharing them with other users. The behavior struck a chord with Silbermann, and he shifted the company to building Pinterest, which allowed users to create collections of a variety of items and share them with each other.

The development of Pinterest began in December 2009, and the site launched the prototype as a closed beta in March 2010. Nine months after the launch, the website had 10,000 users. Silbermann said he wrote to the first 5,000 users, offering his phone number and even meeting with some of them. The launch of an iPhone app in early March 2011 brought in more downloads than expected. This was followed by an iPad app and Pinterest Mobile, a version of the website for non-iPhone users. Silbermann and a few programmers operated the site out of a small apartment until mid-2011.

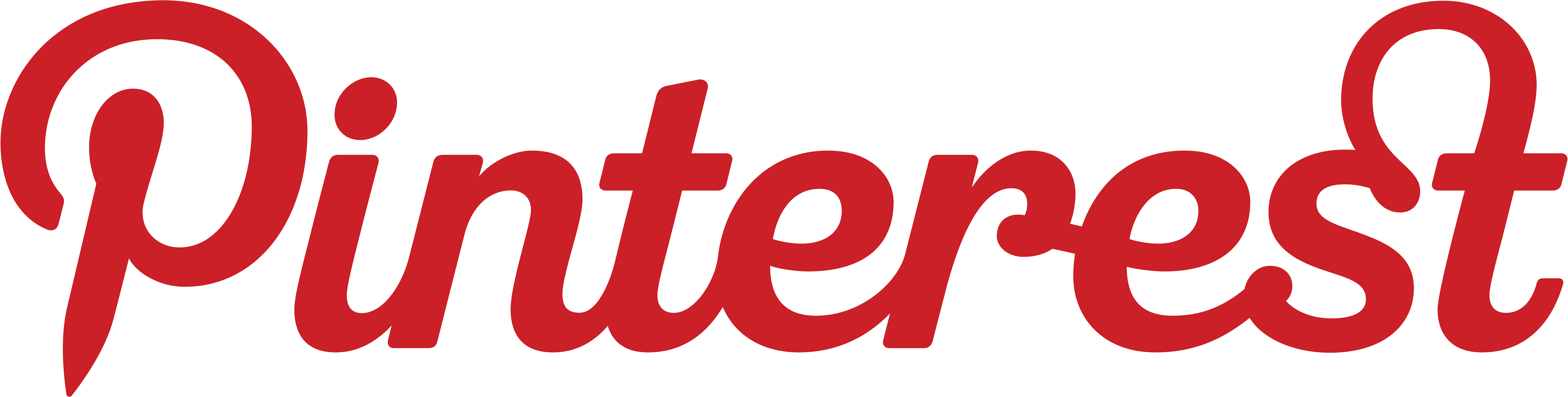
Logo from 2011

Pinterest grew rapidly during this period. On August 10, 2011, Time magazine listed Pinterest in its "50 Best Websites of 2011" article. In December 2011, the site became one of the top 10 largest social network services, according to Hitwise data, with 11 million total visits per week. Pinterest won the Best New Startup of 2011 at the TechCrunch Crunchies Awards. For January 2012, comScore reported the site had 11.7 million unique U.S. visitors, making it the fastest site ever to break through the 10 million unique visitor mark. At the 2012 Webby Awards, Pinterest won Best Social Media App and People's Voice Award for best functioning visual design.

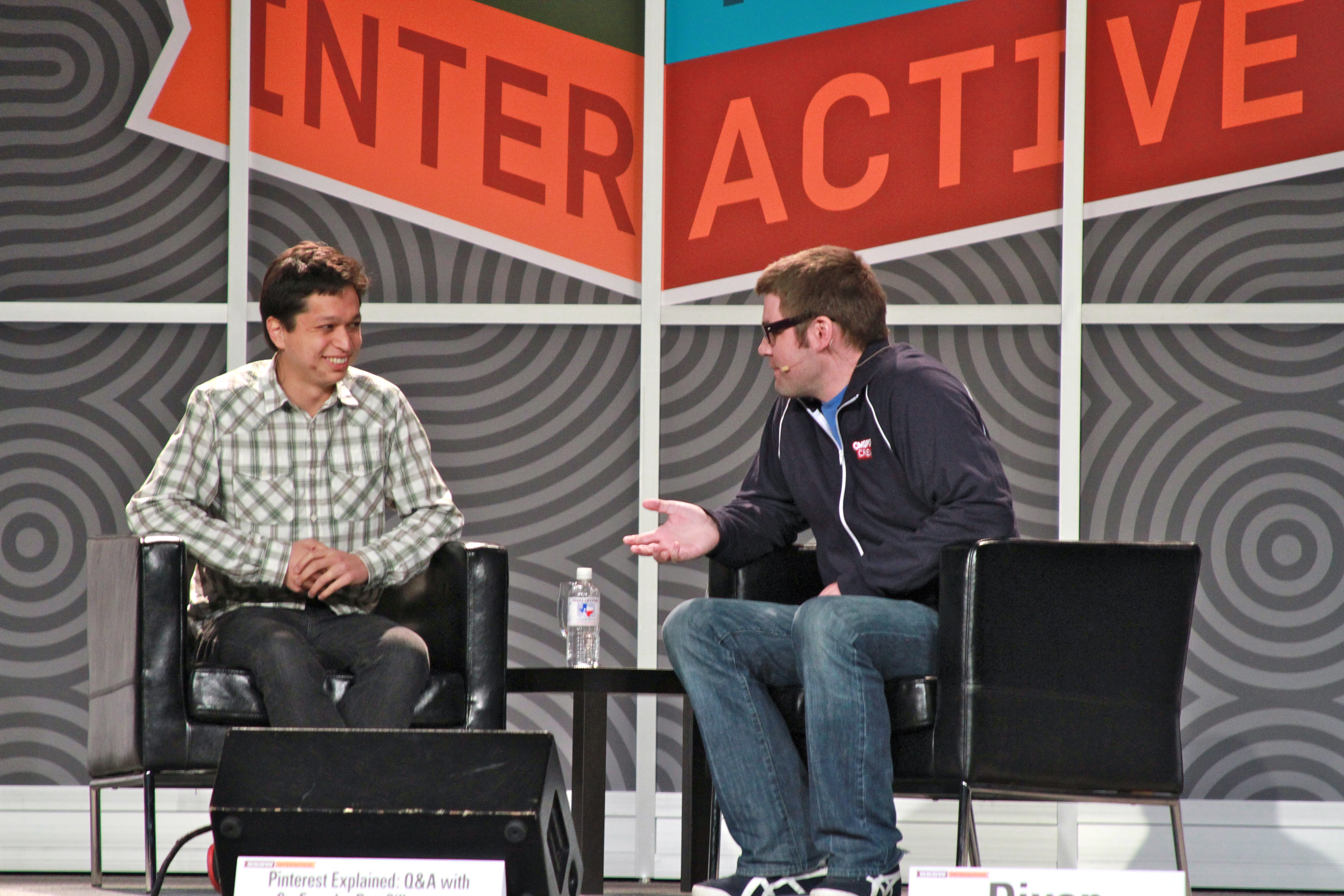
Founder Ben Silbermann (left) presented at the South by Southwest Interactive conference in March 2012.

On March 23, 2012, Pinterest unveiled updated terms of service that eliminated the policy that gave it the right to sell its users' content. On August 10, 2012, Pinterest altered its policy so that a request or an invitation was no longer required to join the site. In October 2012, Pinterest launched business accounts allowing businesses to either convert their existing personal accounts into business accounts or start from scratch.

Logo from 2017

In April 2017, Pinterest removed its post "liking" feature as it seemed redundant to "boards", which are user collections of posts. Users' existing indexes of liked posts were converted into a collection ("board") named as such.

Although starting out as a "social network" with boards, in later years the company has put increasing emphasis in visual search and e-commerce, such as shopping catalogs.

In February 2019, The Wall Street Journal stated that Pinterest secretly filed for an initial public offering (IPO) of stock. The total valuation of the company at the time reached $12 billion. They went public on April 18, 2019, at $19 per share, closing the day at $24.40 per share.

For 2020, Pinterest reported advertising revenue of $1.7 billion, an increase of 48% from 2019. On March 3, 2021, Pinterest announced Pinterest Premiere, a video ads product "which will appear in people's feeds, targeted to their interests and other characteristics". Later in April, chief financial officer Todd Morgenfeld announced plans to spend more money on marketing in order to offset a potential slowdown in activity as the United States economy reopened with more people getting vaccinated for COVID-19.

On October 20, 2021, Bloomberg reported that PayPal is interested in acquiring Pinterest, with a potential price of around $70 a share. PayPal's board and management decided later that same week to back away from a potential deal.

In December 2021, Pinterest acquired the editing and video creation app Vochi. Following this, In May 2022, it was announced that Pinterest released a new video streaming app "Pinterest TV studio". The app is aimed at allowing users to live-stream on its platform and use different devices for different angles while live-streaming on the Pinterest platform.

On June 28, 2022, Pinterest announced that co-founder, CEO and President, Ben Silbermann would transition to the newly created role of Executive Chairman, and online commerce expert Bill Ready will become chief executive officer and a member of the board of directors.

On August 1, 2022, Pinterest quietly launched a new app named Shuffles, which allows users to build collages out of photos from Pinterest's library or those that are uploaded by the user.

In January 2023 at CES, Pinterest announced its partnership with LiveRamp, a data enablement platform to create data 'clean rooms' for selected advertisers on the platform. These 'clean rooms' allow Pinterest's ad partners to utilize first-party data for personalized ads without having to share the data with Pinterest. With data privacy a large concern for online platforms and their users, this partnership is an effort to stimulate ad business on the platform while keeping its user's data safe and in compliance with new data collection regulations. The first advertiser to pilot this feature will be grocery retailer, Albertsons with a winter healthy eating campaign.

In January 2026, Pinterest announced Bring My Pinterest to Life, a new TV-style series set to air on Roku TV, with a March 2026 debut. During the same month, Pinterest cut about 15% of its workforce in its struggle to compete for advertising dollars against deep-pocketed platforms, sending its shares down 12% in extended trading.

In August 2026, Pinterest and Zillow announced a partnership allowing advertisers to use Zillow audience data to target Pinterest users based on housing-related interests.

== Features and content ==
The creators behind Pinterest summarized the service as a "catalogue of ideas" that inspires users to "go out and do that thing", although that it is not an image-based "social network". It also has a very large fashion profile. In later years, Pinterest has also been described as a "visual search engine".

Pinterest consists mainly of "pins" and "boards", where a pin is an image that has been linked from a website or uploaded. Pins saved from one user's board can be saved to someone else's board, a process known as "repinning". Boards are collections of pins dedicated to a theme. Boards with multiple ideas can have different sections that further contain multiple pins. Users can follow and unfollow other users as well as boards, which would fill the "home feed".

Content can also be found outside Pinterest and similarly uploaded to a board via the "Save" button, which can be downloaded to the bookmark bar on a web browser, or be implemented by a webmaster directly on the website. It was originally called the "Pin it" button, but it was renamed in 2016 to "Save" to try to make the site more intuitive to new users.

In August 2016, Pinterest launched a video player that lets users and brands upload and store clips of any length straight to the site.

=== Exploring ===
Design as of 2012

The home feed is a collection of Pins from the users, boards, and topics followed, as well as a few promoted pins and pins Pinterest has picked. On the main Pinterest page, a "pin feed" appears, displaying the chronological activity from the Pinterest boards that a user follows.

In October 2013, Pinterest began displaying advertisements in the form of "Promoted Pins". Promoted Pins are based on an individual user's interests, things done on Pinterest, or a result of visiting an advertiser's site or app.

In 2015, Pinterest implemented a feature that allows users to search with images instead of words.

In March 2020, Pinterest introduced the "Today" tab on the home feed which shows trending pins.

In October 2022, Pinterest announced that its video-focused "Idea Pins" feature has included the ability to add popular tracks from top artists from licensing deals with Warner Music Group, Warner Chappell Music, Merlin, and BMG.

==== Visual search ====
In 2017, Pinterest introduced a "visual search" function that allows users to search for elements in images (existing pins, existing parts of a photo, or new photos) and guide users to suggested similar content within Pinterest's database. The tools powered by artificial intelligence are called Pinterest Lens, Shop the Look, and Instant Ideas.

=== Shopping and catalogs ===
The platform has drawn businesses, especially retailers, to create pages aimed at promoting their companies online as a "virtual storefront".

In 2013, Pinterest introduced a new tool called "Rich Pins", to enhance the customer experience when browsing through pins made by companies. Business pages can include various data, topics, and information such as prices of products, ratings of movies or ingredients for recipes.

In June 2015, Pinterest unveiled "buyable pins" that allows users to purchase things directly from Pinterest. In October 2018, the buyable pins feature was replaced by "Product Pins"

In March 2019, Pinterest added product catalogs and personalized shopping recommendations with the "more from [brand]" option, showcasing a range of product Pins from the same business.

=== Pinterest Analytics ===
Pinterest Analytics is a service that generates comprehensive statistics on a specific website's traffic, commonly used by marketers. Impressions, Engagements, Pin clicks, Outbound clicks, and Saves are some aspects of user data that Pinterest Analytics provides. It also collects data that depicts the percentage of change within a specific time to determine if a product is more popular on a specific day during the week or is slowly becoming unpopular. This data can help marketing agencies. The "Most Clicked" tab in Pinterest Analytics demonstrates products that are more likely to sell. Through the access of Pinterest Analytics, companies receive data via API.

=== Creator Fund ===
Pinterest has the conception of creating a digital and visual bookmarking platform for displaying personal identities and tastes. The Pinterest interface emphasizes the content of pins and links while the users are the media through which the content is communicated, spreading among users through pinning and repinning. The individualized formulation of the app makes it not very social; instead, it serves its pursuit to discover, develop, and refine personal interests. Pinterest faces a decline in the period of platforms like TikTok.

In 2021, the site announced its new Creator Fund, with the stated aim of trying to support creators and their ability to monetize their efforts to preserve engagement and interactions on the platform. The program's initial launch increased creators' overall monthly views by 72%. Pinterest will invest $1.2 million in underrepresented creators via cash grants, ad credits, and equipment.

=== Teen safety features ===
Pinterest offers teen safety options when creating a profile or account for those aged 16 and under. In addition to their minimum age requirement of 13 years old to create an account, Pinterest has a default setting for all teen accounts under the age of 16 to be private. This ensures that the followers and activity for the teen safety account remain hidden from the public. While most teen safety options are set by default, there are settings that can be changed over time. Users under the age of 16 can not change their profile in their settings as the default is private. Comments under pins are restricted for those under the age of 18 and all boards and pins created by teens will only remain visible to the user because of the default settings. Moreover, new affordances have been created surrounding group board invites and messaging within the application, restricting these functions to mutual followers. This rollout is following the review by NBC News by Stephen Sauer of the nonprofit Canadian centre for Child Protection, who found that "his homepage 'almost immediately' filled with images of children often dressed in similarly revealing attire, several of which had received sexually suggestive comments". In order to further the agenda of protecting young users, Pinterest has added more affordances for reporting 'spam', 'inappropriate cover images', and options to 'call-out when content may involve a minor'.

== Usage ==
Pinterest is a free website that requires registration to use. The service is currently accessible through a web browser, and apps for iOS, Android, and Windows 10 PCs.

In February 2013, Reuters and ComScore stated that Pinterest had 48.7 million users globally, and a study released in July 2013 by French social media agency Semiocast revealed the website had 70 million users worldwide. In October 2016, the company had 150 million monthly active users (70 million in the U.S. and 80 million outside it), rising to 175 million monthly active users by April 2017 and 250 million in September 2018. As of July 2020, there were over 400 million monthly active users. In April 2023, Pinterest reported 463 million monthly active users, which suggests that 7.4% of the world's population over age 13 use Pinterest.

Around 2020, Pinterest was thought to flood search results in Google Images. In 2022 Google claimed to have performed changes to increase "diversity" in the search results. Pinterest claimed that, as a consequence of Google's changes of November 2021, "U.S. monthly active users coming to Pinterest from the web, desktop and mobile web declined around 30% year over year".

=== Demographics ===
Pinterest has largely appealed to women, especially with its early user base. According to the 2023 Comscore report, the audience of Pinterest users are known to be 70% women and 30% men. (Note: Comscore, self-reported gender identity for survey respondents over 18. US, Aug 2023 https://business.pinterest.com/audience/) Despite Pinterest's popularity among all age groups ranging from 18 to 44, the rise of a new generation led to Gen-Z users dominating the majority of the audience as they make up 42% of Pinterest's global user base. (Note: Pinterest analysis, global, Q3 2023 https://business.pinterest.com/audience/) In the United States alone, Pinterest reaches about 46% of users in the age range 18-24 and 40% of those in the age range of 25–34. (Note: Comscore, multi-platform media matrix analysis panel, US, Jan 2024 https://business.pinterest.com/audience/) Although men have not been a primary audience on Pinterest, their usage reportedly increased 48%. In terms of age distribution, users between the ages of 18 and 25 have grown twice as fast as those over the age of 25. However, both users between the ages of 18 and 25 and users between the ages of 25 and 40 have been driving the growth of Pinterest.

=== In science ===
Data from Pinterest has been used for research in different areas. For example, it is possible to find patterns of activity that attract the attention of audience and content reposting, including the extent to which users specialize in particular topics, and homophily among users. Another work focused on studying the characteristics, manifestations and overall effects of user behaviors from various aspects, as well as correlations between neighboring users and the topology of the network structure. There is also a study that was based on Pinterest and proposed a novel pinboard recommendation system for Twitter users.

== Corporate affairs ==
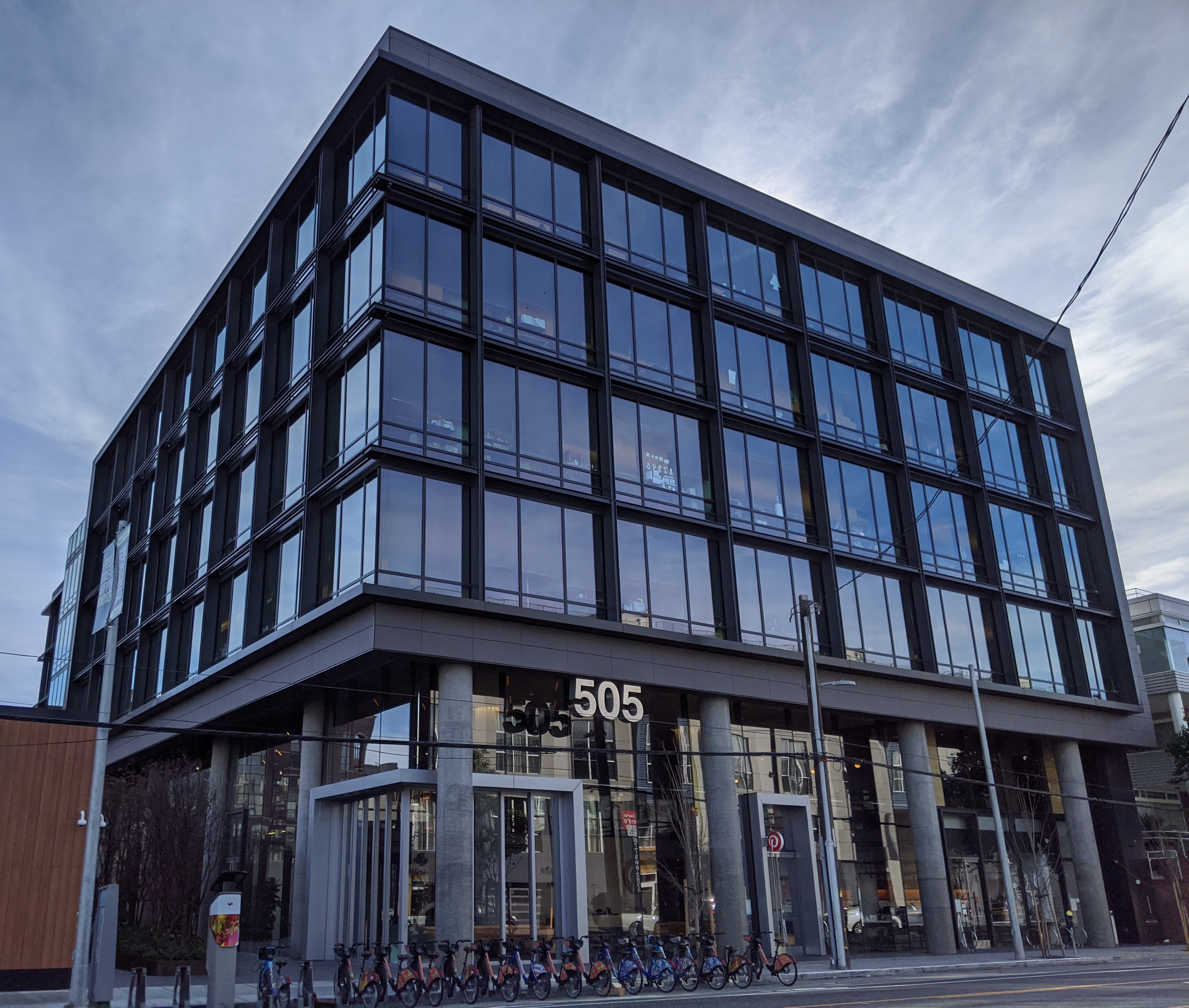
Part of Pinterest's headquarters in San Francisco's SoMa area (2019)

Pinterest, Inc. is headquartered in San Francisco, California. Originally it was based in Palo Alto before moving in 2012.

In early 2011, the company secured a US$10 million Series A financing led by Jeremy Levine and Sarah Tavel of Bessemer Venture Partners. In October 2011, the company secured US$27 million in funding from Andreessen Horowitz, which valued the company at US$200 million. Co-founder Paul Sciarra left his position at Pinterest in April 2012 for a consulting job as entrepreneur in residence at Andreessen Horowitz.

On May 17, 2012, Japanese electronic commerce company Rakuten announced it was leading a $100 million investment in Pinterest, alongside investors including Andreessen Horowitz, Bessemer Venture Partners, and FirstMark Capital, based on a valuation of $1.5 billion.

On September 20, 2012, Pinterest announced the hiring of its new head of engineering, Jon Jenkins. Jenkins came from Amazon, where he spent eight years as an engineering lead and was also a director of developer tools, platform analysis and website platform.

In late October 2013, Pinterest secured a $225 million round of equity funding that valued the website at $3.8 billion.

In 2014, Pinterest generated its first revenue, when it began charging advertisers. An analyst at Wedbush Securities estimated that ads could generate up to $500 million in 2016. In 2015, investors valued Pinterest, Inc. at $11 billion, making it a "unicorn" (a start-up with a valuation exceeding $1 billion). As of 2017, the company was valued at $12 billion.

In June 2017, Pinterest raised $150 million from a group of existing investors.

In August 2020, Pinterest paid $89.5 million to cancel a large office space lease on a to-be-completed complex in San Francisco's SoMa area, near its current headquarters.

In April 2023, Pinterest announced a partnership with Amazon to show third-party advertisements on the website, which will allow users to be redirected to Amazon to make purchases.

=== Acquisitions ===
In March 2013, Pinterest acquired Livestar. The terms were not disclosed. In early October 2013, Pinterest acquired Hackermeter. The company's co-founders, Lucas Baker and Frost Li, joined Pinterest as engineers.

In April 2015, Pinterest acquired the team from Hike Labs, which had been developing a mobile publishing application called Drafty.

In May 2016, Pinterest acquired mobile deep linking startup URX to help accelerate its content understanding efforts. The URX team's expertise in mobile content discovery and recommendation would prove critical to helping Pinterest understand its corpus of over 100 billion pins, to better recommend them to its users.

On August 23, 2016, Pinterest announced that it would be acquiring the team behind Instapaper, which continued operating as a separate app. The Instapaper team worked on the core Pinterest experience and updating Instapaper.

On March 8, 2017, Pinterest said it had acquired Jelly Industries, a small search engine company founded by Biz Stone.

In December 2021, Pinterest announced the acquisition of the Vochi app.

In June 2022, Pinterest announced its definitive agreement to acquire San Francisco based AI-driven fashion shopping platform, The Yes. Pinterest announced that it had closed the acquisition on June 10, 2022.

== Criticism ==
=== Copyrighted content ===
Pinterest has a notification system that copyright holders can use to request that content be removed from the site. Pinterest released a statement in March 2012 saying it believed it was protected by the Digital Millennium Copyright Act (DMCA)'s safe harbor provisions. The DMCA safe harbor status of Pinterest has been questioned given that it actively promotes its users to copy to Pinterest, for their perpetual use, any image on the Internet. Pinterest users cannot claim safe harbor status and as such are exposed to possible legal action for pinning copyright material. Pinterest allows users to transfer information; intellectual property rights come to play.

A "nopin" HTML meta tag was released by Pinterest on February 20, 2012, to allow websites to opt out of their images being pinned. On February 24, 2012, Flickr implemented the code to allow users to opt out.

In early May 2012, the site added automatic attribution of authors on images originating from Flickr, Behance, YouTube and Vimeo. Automatic attribution was also added for Pins from sites mirroring content on Flickr. At the same time, Flickr added a Pin shortcut to its share option menu to users who have not opted out of sharing their images.

Content creators on sites such as iStock have expressed concern over their work being reused on Pinterest without permission. Getty Images said that it was aware of Pinterest's copyright issues and was in discussion with them.

=== Legal status ===
In February 2012, photographer and lawyer Kirsten Kowalski wrote a blog post explaining how her interpretation of copyright law led her to delete all her infringing pins. The post contributed to scrutiny over Pinterest's legal status. The post went viral and reached founder Ben Silbermann who contacted Kowalski to discuss making the website more compliant with the law.

=== Terms of service ===
Pinterest's earlier terms of service asserted the right to "sell" user content. In a March 2012 article in Scientific American, illustrator Kalliopi Monoyios alleged that "Pinterest's terms of service have been garnering a lot of criticism for stating in no uncertain terms that anything you 'pin' to their site belongs to them. Completely. Wholly. Forever and for always." At the time, Pinterest's terms of service stated that:

By making available any Member Content through the Site, Application or Services, you hereby grant to Cold Brew Labs a worldwide, irrevocable, perpetual, non-exclusive, transferable, royalty-free license, with the right to sublicense, to use, copy, adapt, modify, distribute, license, sell, transfer, publicly display, publicly perform, transmit, stream, broadcast, access, view, and otherwise exploit such Member Content only on, through or by means of the Site, Application or Services.

According to Monoyios, Pinterest's claim to a broad license to sell user content potentially undermined artists' ability to monetize their own work. Another Scientific American blogger claimed that this provision contradicted another line in the terms of service, that "Cold Brew Labs does not claim any ownership rights in any such Member Content".

Several days later, Pinterest unveiled updated terms of service that, once implemented in April, ended the site's previous claims of ownership of posted images. "Selling content was never our intention", said the company in a blog post.

=== Censorship ===
In its 2019 "Who Has Your Back?" report, the Electronic Frontier Foundation gave Pinterest a three (out of six) star rating, highlighting improvements in the company's transparency reports about government takedown notices, but criticizing the lack of a clear commitment to notify users about content removals and account suspensions.

In March 2017, Chinese authorities blocked Pinterest without explanation. The block was imposed during the annual National People's Congress, a politically sensitive period in the country. While Pinterest is not known for its political content, experts identified the ban as consistent with Chinese government efforts to use website blocks and the "Great Firewall" as an industrial policy tool to promote Chinese tech companies (e.g., Baidu, Youku, Weibo, and Renren) by censoring foreign tech companies. Huaban, Duitang and many other websites bear similarities to Pinterest.

Internet service providers in India had blocked Pinterest following a Madras High Court order in July 2016 to block a list of around 225 "rogue websites indulging in online piracy and infringement of copyright". The block was temporary.

=== Content policies and user bans ===
In October 2012, Pinterest added a new feature allowing users to report others for negative and offensive activity or block other users if they do not want to view their content, a bid that the company said aimed to keep the site "positive and respectful."

In December 2018, Pinterest began to take steps to block health misinformation from its recommendations engine, and blocked various searches, content, and user accounts that related to, or promoted, unproved and disproven cancer treatments. The company said it also blocked multiple accounts that linked to external websites that sold supplements and other products that were not scientifically validated. In January 2019, Pinterest stopped returning search results relating to vaccines, in an effort to somehow slow the increase of anti-vaccination content on the platform. Prior to the measure, the company said that the majority of vaccination-related images shared on the platform were anti-vaccination, contradicting the scientific research establishing the safety of vaccines.

In June 2019, anti-abortion group Live Action was banned from Pinterest; the company said the permanent suspension was imposed for spreading "harmful misinformation, [which] includes medical misinformation and conspiracies that turn individuals and facilities into targets for harassment or violence."

In December 2019, following a campaign from the activist group Color of Change, Pinterest announced that it would restrict content that advertises wedding events on former slave plantations.

Following its pattern of user protection, Pinterest worked with the National Eating Disorders Association in July 2021 to, after having previously put restrictions on them, completely ban weight loss ads due to their harmful nature, becoming the first social media site to do so. According to Pinterest's own reports, this resulted in a 20% decrease from 2021 to 2022 in searches of the phrase "weight loss". This followed an already existing site wide ban on more extreme content explicitly promoting unhealthy surgeries, disorderly eating or supplements for suppressing hunger and losing weight.

Beginning in late April and early May 2025, Pinterest began to remove pins and ban accounts in large volumes citing community guidelines as the reason, causing outrage amongst its users.

=== Discrimination ===
In 2020, two former Pinterest employees, Ifeoma Ozoma and Aerica Shimizu Banks went public about their experience at Pinterest. Both women recounted experiences of discrimination at work, including racist comments, unequal pay, and punishment for speaking out. Additionally, Ozoma claims that the company failed to protect her when personal information was shared with hate sites by a colleague of hers. In response, Pinterest released an apology statement and CEO Ben Silbermann sent an email to all employees pushing the company to do better.

In August 2020, dozens of Pinterest staff participated in a virtual walkout in support of two former colleagues who publicly accused the company of racism and gender discrimination.

In December 2020, Pinterest agreed to pay its former chief operating officer $20 million+ to settle a lawsuit alleging discrimination.

In November 2021, Pinterest settled a lawsuit that alleged racial and gender discrimination. The company agreed to spend $50 million on improving its diversity and to release former employees from non-disclosure agreements. The settlement was in regard to Ozoma and Banks's accusations of June 2020.

== See also ==
- clipix
- List of image-sharing websites
- Timeline of social media
- Visual marketing
