= Ben Silbermann =

American Internet entrepreneur

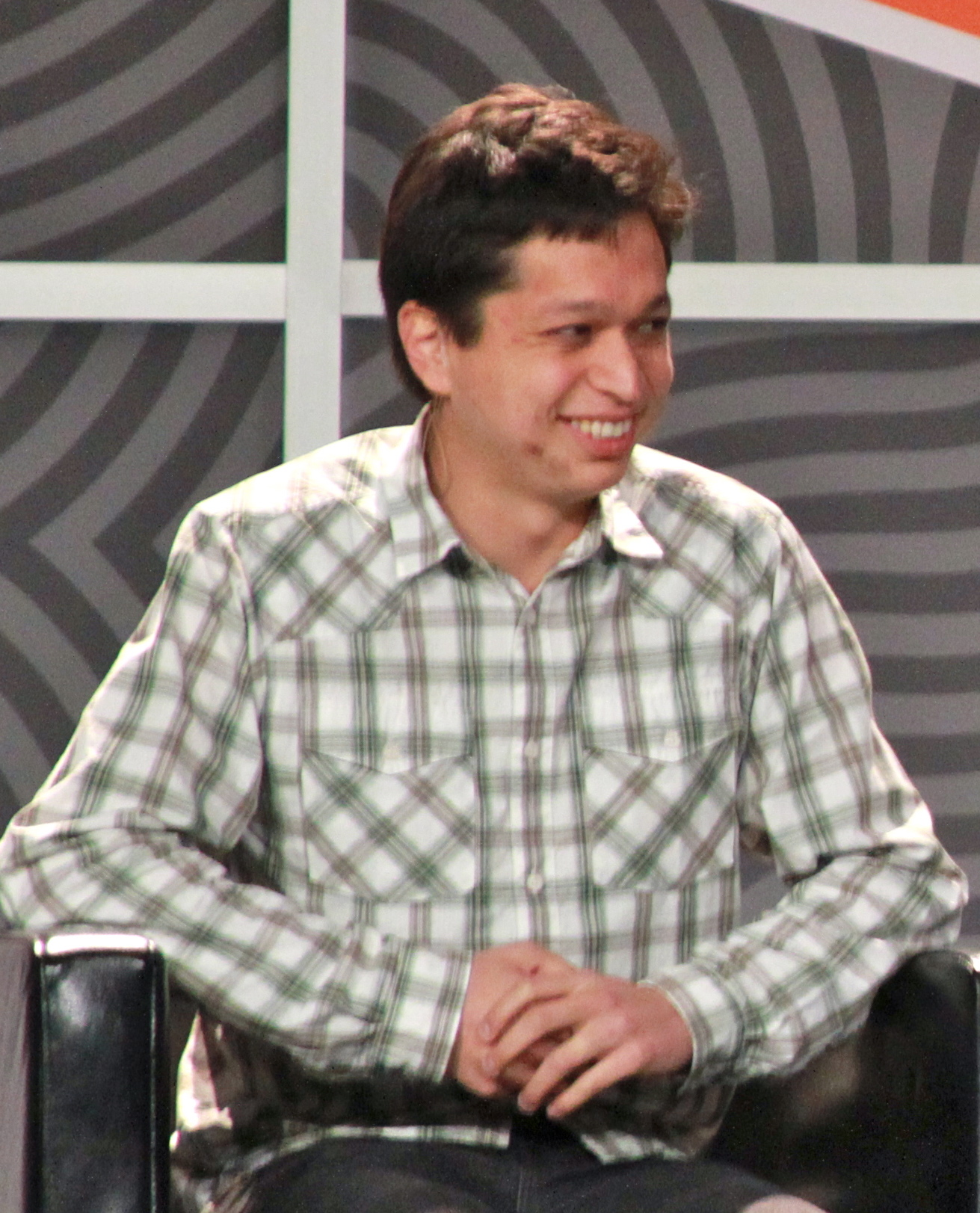
- Silbermann at the South By Southwest Interactive conference in March of 2012 in Austin, Texas, United States
- Born: July 14, 1982 (age 44)
- Education: Yale University (BA)
- Occupation: Executive Chairman of Pinterest
- Known for: Co-founding Pinterest
- Spouse: Divya Bhaskaran

Ben Silbermann (born July 14, 1982) is an American Internet entrepreneur. He is the co-founder and executive chairman of Pinterest, a visual discovery engine which lets users organize images, links, recipes and other things.

== Early life ==
Silbermann was born in Iowa in 1982. He was raised in Des Moines, Iowa, and is of Chinese and German descent. His parents, Jane Wang and Neil Silbermann, are ophthalmologists. In 1998, Silbermann attended the Research Science Institute at MIT. He graduated from Des Moines Central Academy and Des Moines Roosevelt with the class of 1999. He then graduated from Yale University in the spring of 2003 with a degree in Political Science.

== Career ==
Before Pinterest (which launched in March 2010), Silbermann worked at Google in the online advertising group. However, after a short time with the company he left and started designing his own iPhone apps with friends. After his initial application, Tote, failed to gain traction, he teamed up with Evan Sharp to create a pinboard product that would eventually be named Pinterest. Silbermann says that the genesis of Pinterest came from his love of collecting as a kid. "Collecting tells a lot about who you are," he said, and when they looked at the web "there wasn't a place to share that side of who you were." Raising capital to start Pinterest was a hurdle that Silbermann thought laterally about. Silbermann entered the NYU Stern Business Plan Competition. "The prize was meeting with venture capitalists First Mark Capital in New York, which gave us half our money." A little over nine years after starting Pinterest, the company held its IPO in April 2019 which valued the company around 12 billion dollars.

Ben Silbermann in the New York Times circa 2018.

On June 28, 2022, it was announced Silberman would step down as Chief Executive Officer and transition to the role of Executive Chairman. Google executive Bill Ready became Chief Executive Officer and a member of the Board of Directors. During this time, Silbermann was listed on the Forbes billionaires 30 under 30 list.

== Personal life ==
Silbermann is married to Divya Bhaskaran, with whom he has two children. His wife graduated from Clark University in 2004 with a degree in Psychology. The couple resides in San Francisco, California.
