= Vision Times =

American Chinese-language newspaper

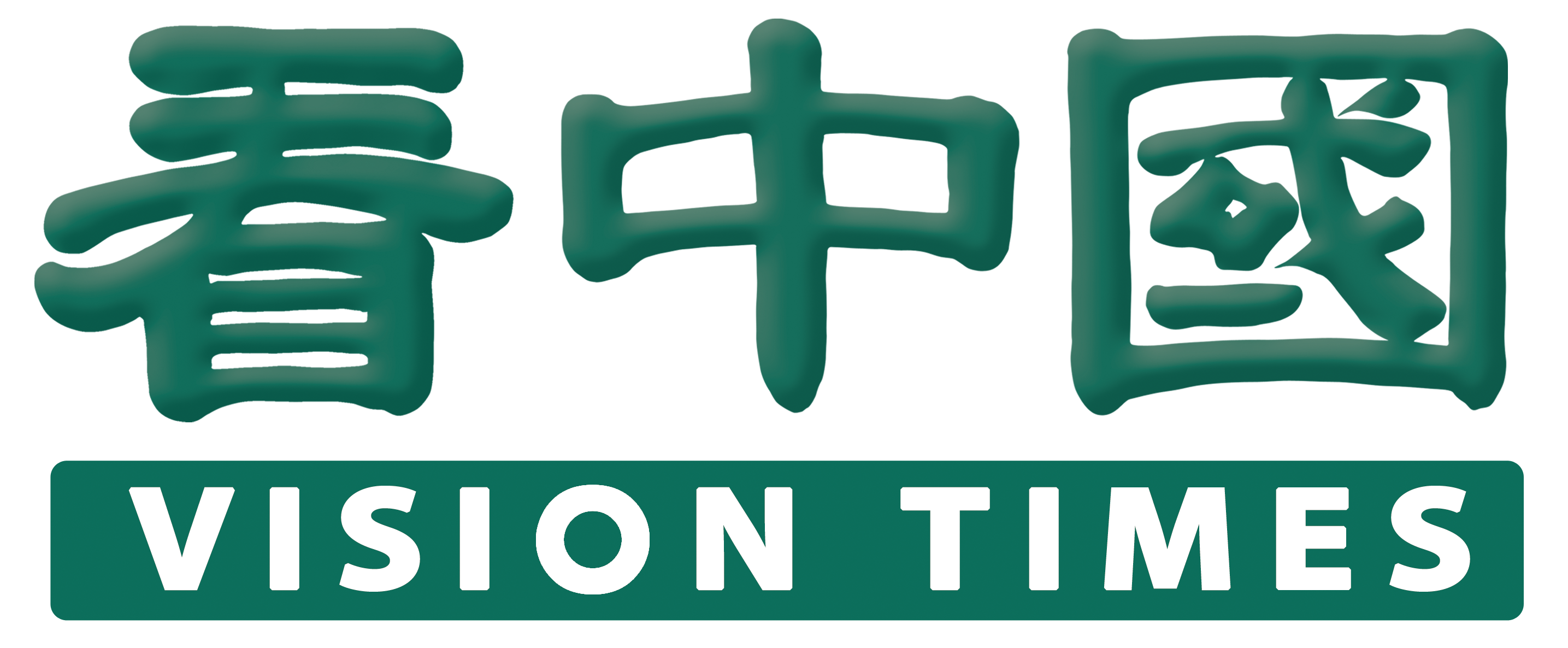
- Format: Weekly Broadsheet Newsprint
- Owner(s): Kanzhongguo Association, Inc.
- Editor-in-chief: Lily Zhang
- Founded: 2001
- Website: www.secretchina.com (in Chinese); visiontimes.com (in English)
- Free online archives: pdf.secretchina.com

Vision Times (simplified Chinese: 看中国; traditional Chinese: 看中國), also known as Kanzhongguo, is a Falun Gong-affiliated Chinese language weekly newspaper. It was founded in 2001 as a website, www.secretchina.com. In 2006, it began publishing weekly print versions in major U.S. cities and Australia (as Vision China Times) where large Chinese communities exist. In 2007, print versions were launched in Europe.

Vision Times operates multiple YouTube channels, including China Observer, China Insights and Vision Times Post.

== Affiliations ==
Vision Times is one of the news organizations referred to as "our media" by Li Hongzhi, founder of Falun Gong, a new religious movement that opposes the Chinese Communist Party. The newspaper's president is the spokesperson for the Falun Dafa Association in New York, and is chair of another Falun Gong group called Quit the CCP. In 2020, ABC's Background Briefing confirmed Vision Times as a Falun Gong publication through testimonies of ex-practitioners and emails of Falun Gong members. In 2021, The Atlantic called Vision Times a "doppelgänger site" of The Epoch Times. In the same year, David Brophy wrote that Vision Times' general manager is part of the Australian Government's Department of Foreign Affairs and Trade's National Foundation for Australia-China Relations.

According to Semafor, the YouTube channel China Insights is affiliated with Vision Times.

In an interview with Hoover Institution, a conservative think tank, Peter Wang, the publisher of the New York edition, claimed the paper is not a Falun Gong operation despite some of the staff being Falun Gong adherents. He claims the purpose of Vision Times was to address the issue of the shrinking space for independent Chinese voices in the United States. The Hoover Institution's 2018 survey of the Chinese language media landscape in the United States said, "The space for truly independent Chinese-language media in the United States has shrunk to a few media outlets supported by the adherents of Falun Gong, the banned religious sect in China, and a small publication and website called Vision Times."

According to the report from the Australian Strategic Policy Institute, Vision Times and The Epoch Times were established with Falun Gong links, with the former sharing domain names and branding with US-based Vision Times. The Australian Vision Times was established by Sydney-based businessman Don Ma, but the ownership was later transferred to Wu Liewang. Vision Times is also affiliated with Decode China, a short-lived website arranged by United States Department of State. The report determined that the falun-gong-backed Vision Times and The Epoch Times were the only outlets absent from political and commercial connections in China.

== Reception ==
Some China experts such as David Brophy from Sydney University have questioned Vision Times' editorial independence from Falun Gong. Brophy pointed to an article published on the Vision Times website, that was titled "Doctors recover from the CCP virus after reciting the nine sacred words". He said the outlet had presented the article as a factual account of people curing themselves of COVID-19 by participating in a Falun Gong ritual, and said he did not believe that a non-Falun Gong practitioner would have written such a story.

ABC's Background Briefing noted that Vision Times had also published an unsourced report that former Chinese political leaders were interested in eating human brains.

Media Bias/Fact Check rated Vision Times as being a "questionable" source, citing its publication of pseudoscience, promotion of propaganda, and lack of transparency.

== Bibliography ==
- Brophy, David (2021), China Panic: Australia's Alternative to Paranoia and Pandering, La Trobe University Press ISBN 9781760642501
