= Austin, Texas =

Capital city of Texas, United States

Austin
- State capital
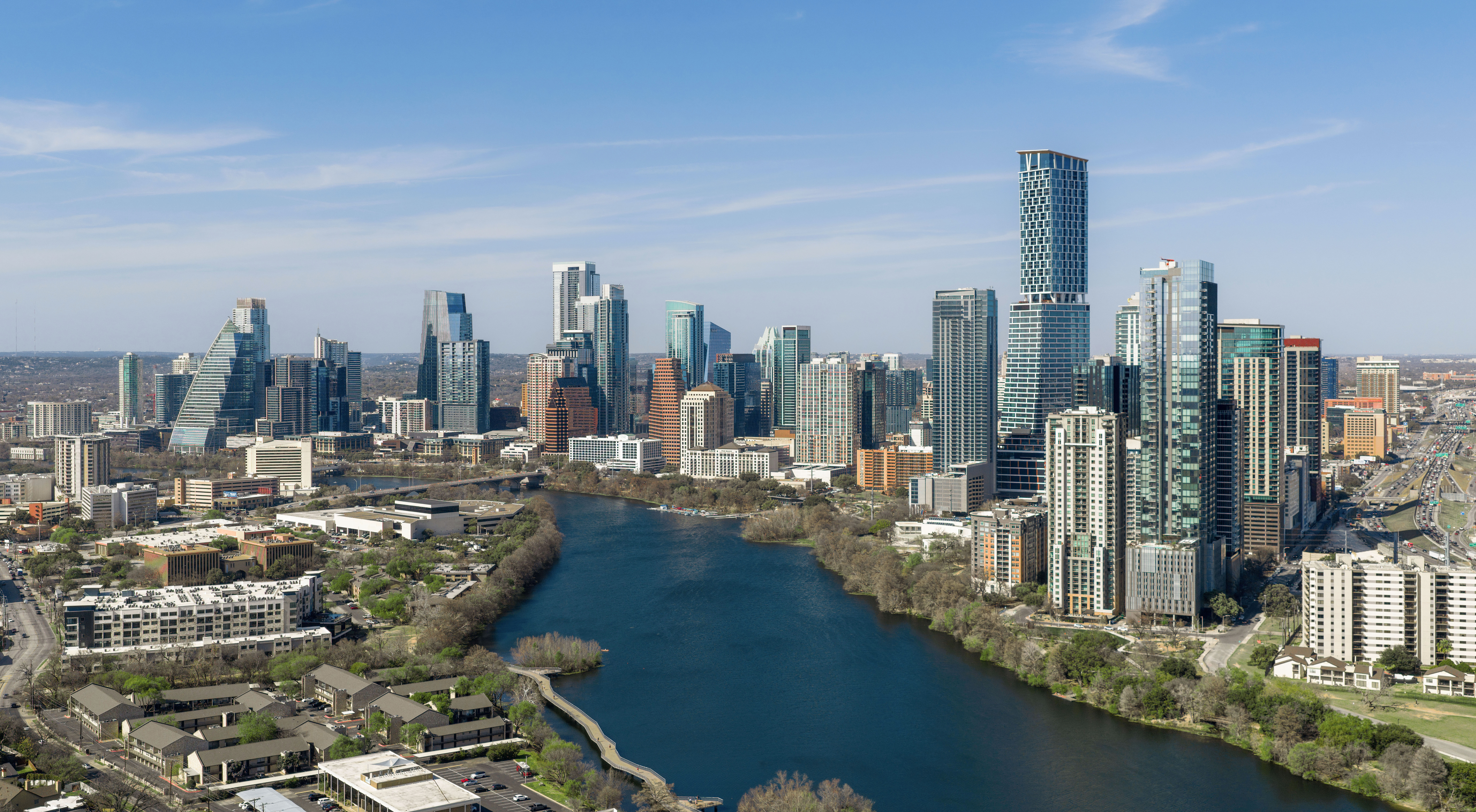
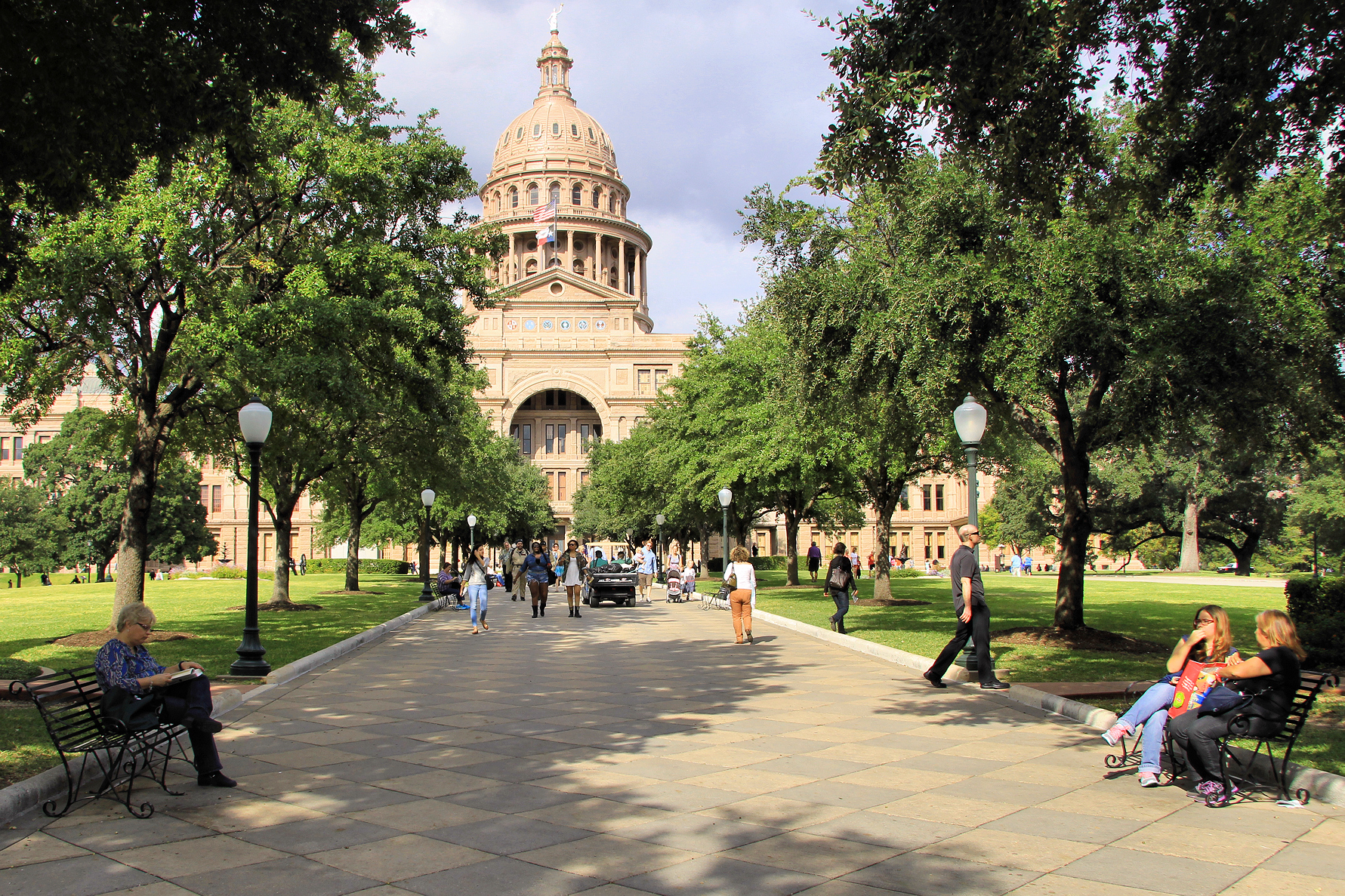
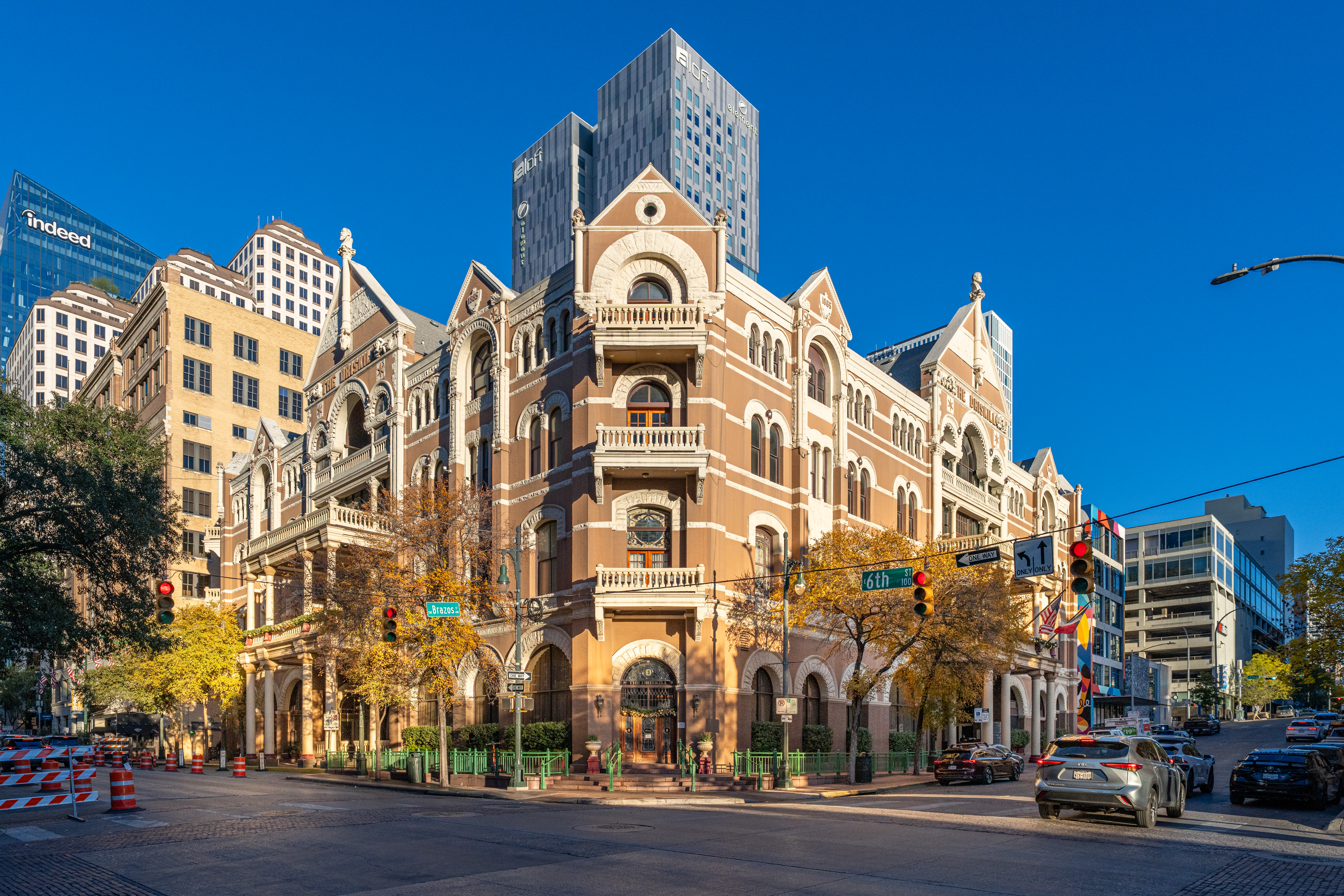
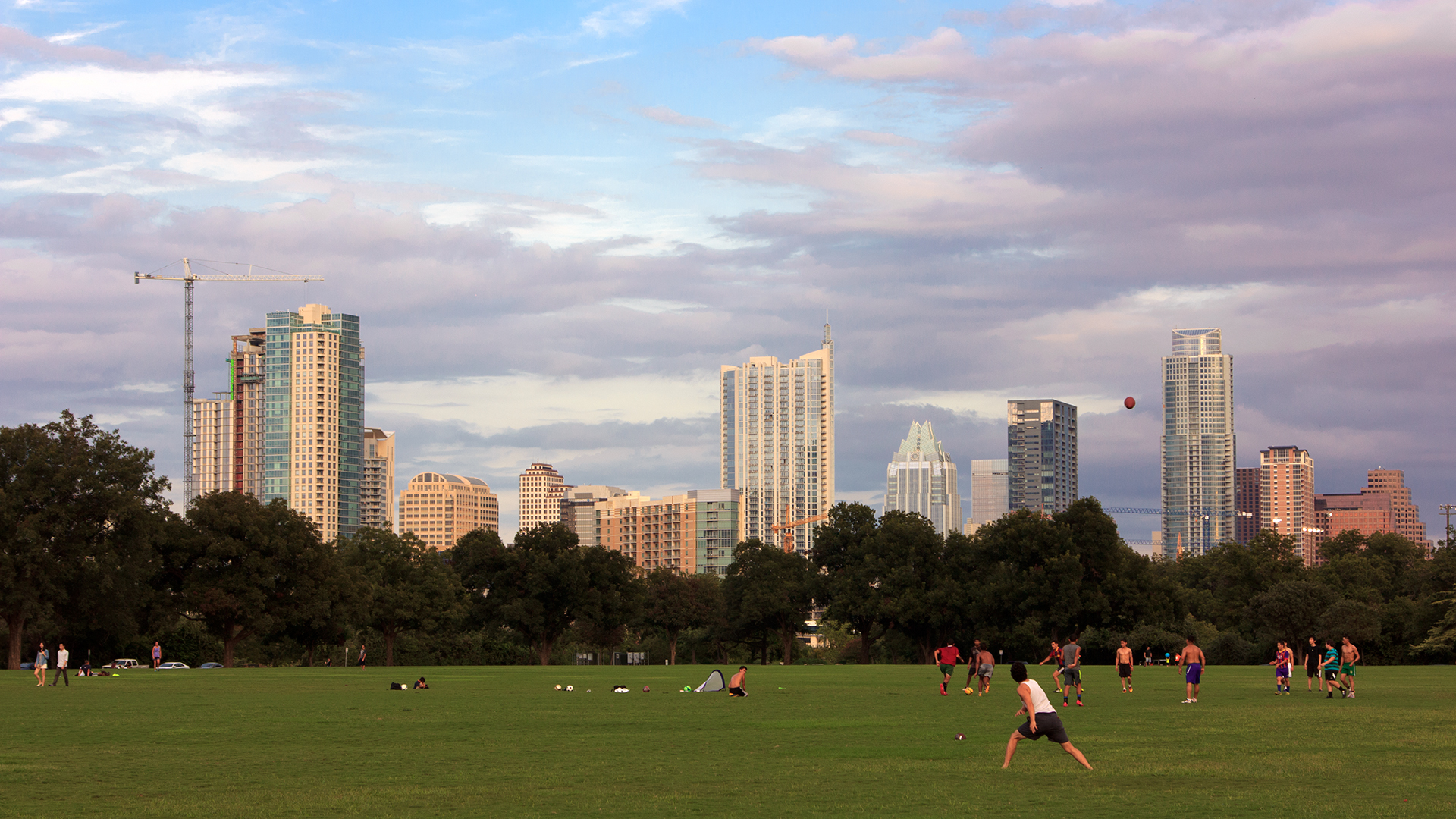
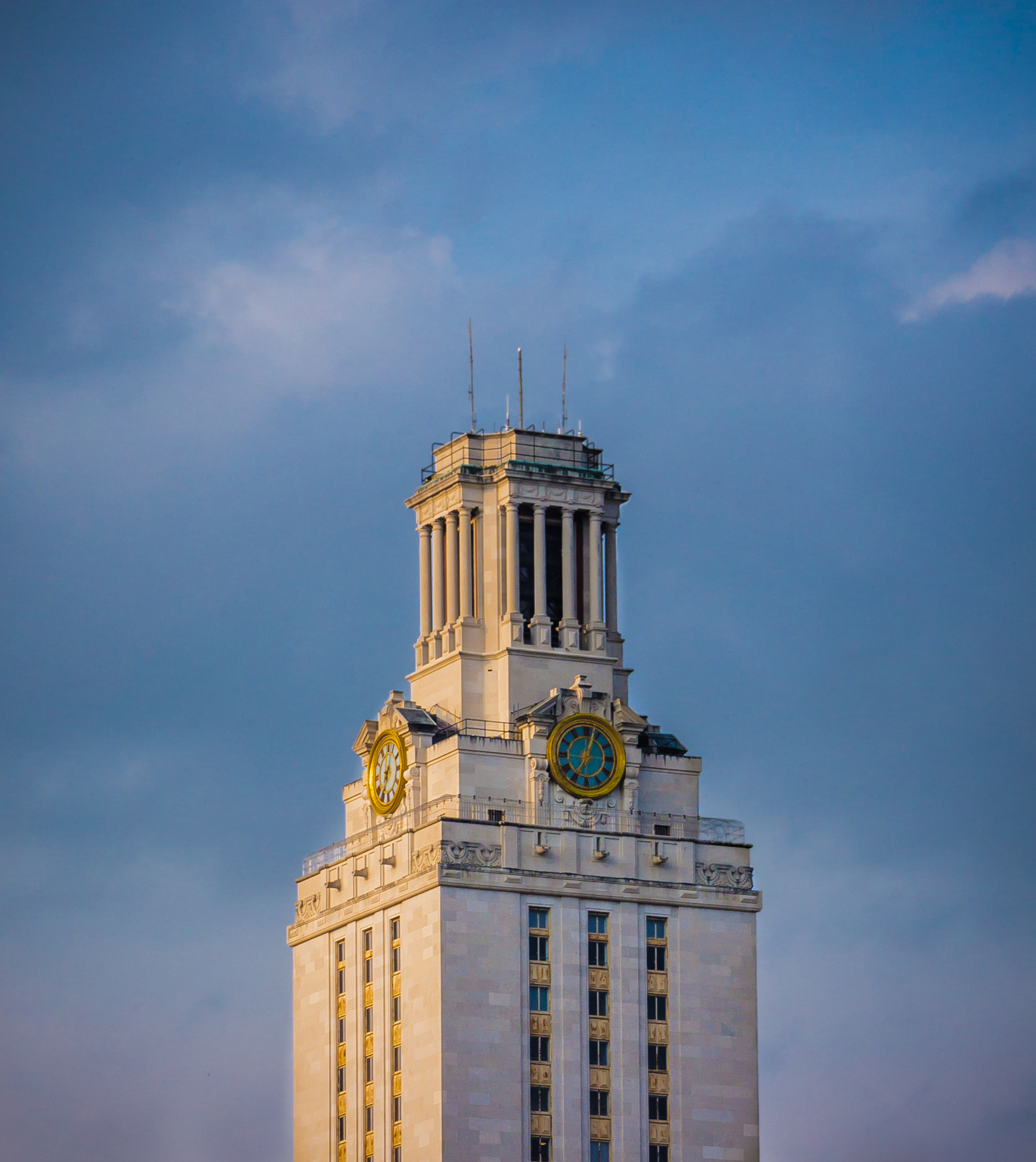
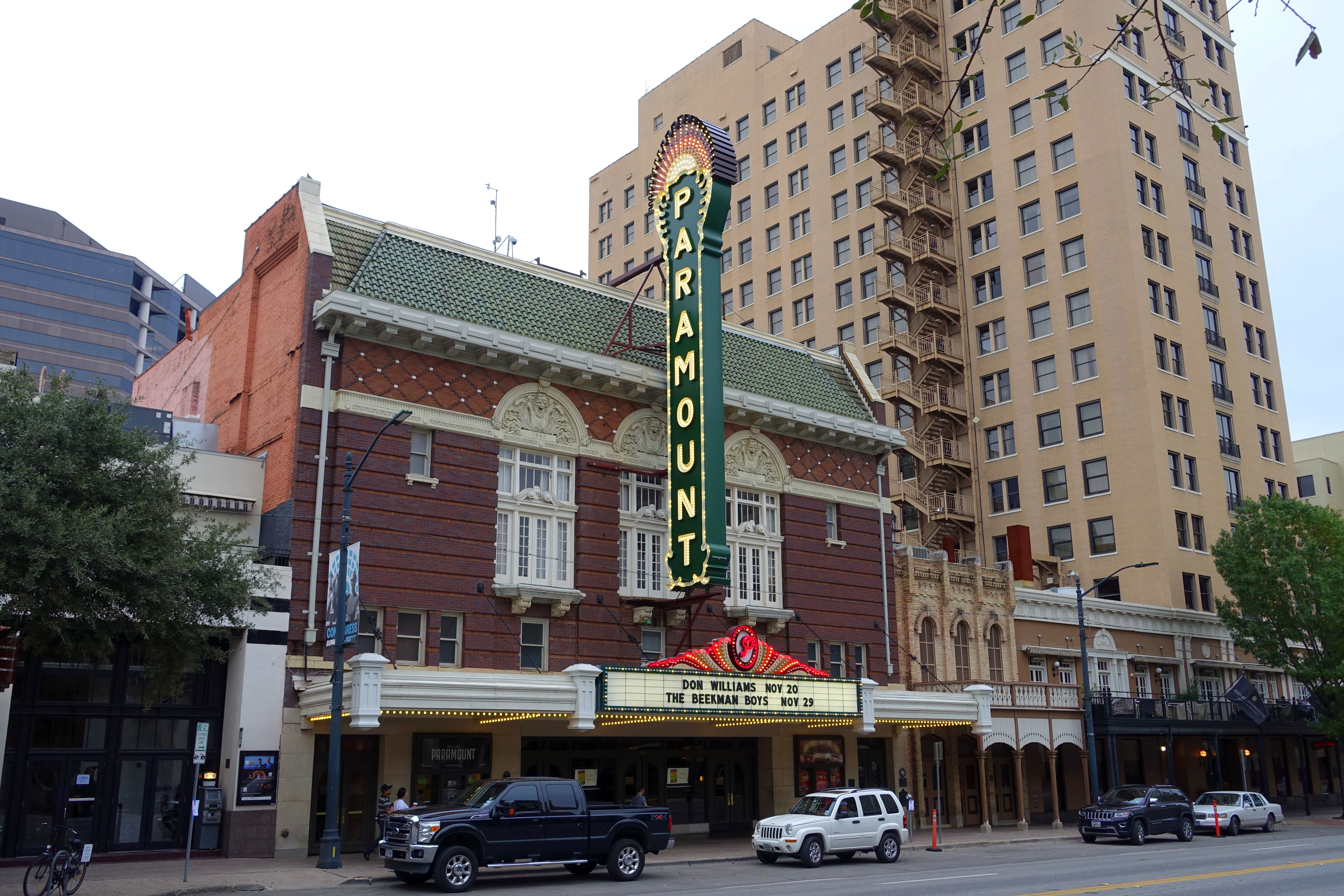
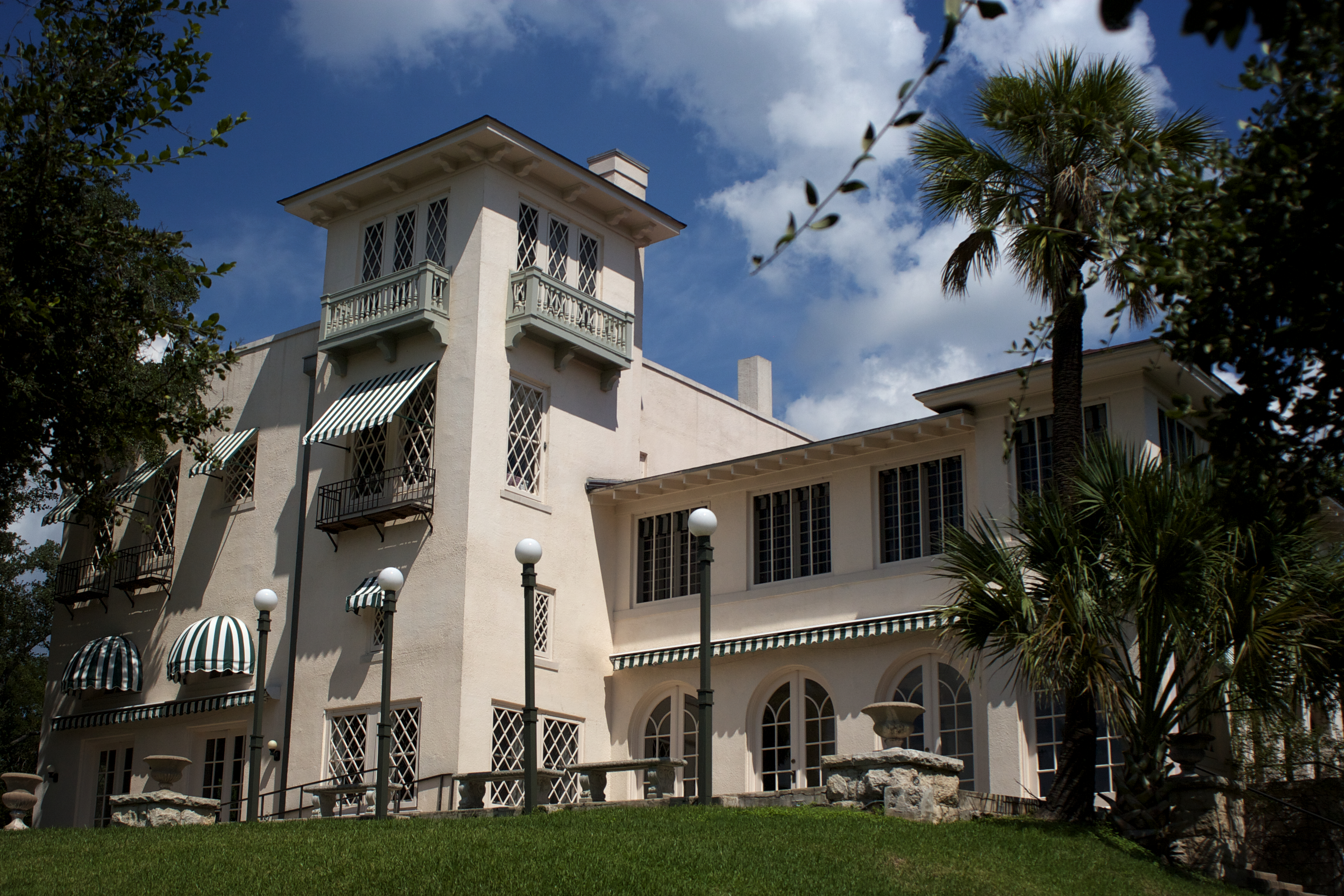
- Downtown Austin skyline Texas State Capitol Driskill Hotel Zilker Park The Clock Tower at UT Austin Paramount Theatre Laguna Gloria

- Flag Seal Coat of arms Logo
- Nicknames: Live Music Capital of the World, Silicon Hills, ATX, City of the Violet Crown
- Motto: Keep Austin Weird (unofficial)
- Interactive map of Austin
- Location within Texas Location within the United States
- Coordinates: 30°16′02″N 97°44′35″W
- Country: United States
- State: Texas
- Counties: Travis, Hays, Williamson
- Settled: 1835; 191 years ago
- Incorporated: December 27, 1839; 186 years ago
- Named for: Stephen F. Austin

Government
  - Type: Council–manager
  - Mayor: Kirk Watson (D) (Note: All elected officials in the city of Austin are officially nonpartisan; party affiliation is for informational purposes only.)
  - Body: Austin City Council
  - City manager: T.C. Broadnax

Area
  - State capital: 326.51 sq mi (845.66 km^{2})
  - Land: 319.94 sq mi (828.64 km^{2})
  - Water: 6.57 sq mi (17.02 km^{2})
  - Metro: 4,285.70 sq mi (11,099.91 km^{2})
- Elevation: 607 ft (185 m)

Population (2020)
  - State capital: 961,855
  - Estimate (2025): 1,002,632 ▲
  - Rank: 32nd in North America; 12th in the United States; 5th in Texas
  - Density: 3,006.4/sq mi (1,160.76/km^{2})
  - Urban: 1,809,888 (US: 29th)
  - Urban density: 2,921/sq mi (1,127.8/km^{2})
  - Metro: 2,550,637 (US: 25th)
- Demonym: Austinite

GDP
  - Metro: $248.110 billion (2023)
- Time zone: UTC−6 (CST)
  - Summer (DST): UTC−5 (CDT)
- ZIP Codes: 73301, 73344, 78681, 78701–78705, 78708–78739, 78741–78742, 78744–78768, 78772–78774, 78778–78779, 78783, 78799
- Area codes: 512 & 737
- FIPS code: 48-05000
- GNIS feature ID: 2409761
- Website: austintexas.gov

Austin (/ˈɔːstɪn/ AW-stin) is the capital city of the U.S. state of Texas. With a population of 961,855 at the 2020 census, it is the 12th-most populous city in the U.S., fifth-most populous city in Texas, and second-most populous U.S. state capital (after Phoenix, Arizona), while the Austin metro area with an estimated 2.55 million residents is the 25th-largest metropolitan area in the nation. Austin is the county seat and most populous city of Travis County, with portions extending into Hays and Williamson counties. Incorporated on December 27, 1839, it has been one of the fastest-growing large cities in the United States since 2010.

Located in Central Texas within the greater Texas Hill Country, it is home to numerous lakes, rivers, and waterways, including Lady Bird Lake and Lake Travis on the Colorado River, Barton Springs, McKinney Falls, and Lake Walter E. Long. Austin and San Antonio are approximately 80 miles (129 km) apart, and both fall along the I-35 corridor. This combined metropolitan region of San Antonio–Austin has approximately 5 million people. Austin is the southernmost state capital in the contiguous United States and is considered a Gamma + level global city as categorized by the Globalization and World Cities Research Network.

Residents of Austin are known as Austinites. The city's official slogan promotes Austin as "The Live Music Capital of the World", a reference to the city's many musicians and live music venues, as well as the long-running PBS TV concert series Austin City Limits. Austin is the site of South by Southwest (SXSW), an annual conglomeration of parallel film, interactive media, and music festivals. The city also adopted "Silicon Hills" as a nickname in the 1990s due to a rapid influx of technology and development companies. In recent years, some Austinites have adopted the unofficial slogan "Keep Austin Weird", which refers to the desire to protect small, unique, and local businesses from being overrun by large corporations. Ongoing rapid development and gentrification challenge its bohemian roots and fuel nostalgia for “Old Austin". Since the late 19th century, Austin has also been known as the "City of the Violet Crown", because of the colorful glow of light across the hills just after sunset.

Emerging from a strong economic focus on government and education, Austin has become a center for technology and business since the 1990s. The technology roots in Austin can be traced back to the 1960s, when defense electronics contractor Tracor (now BAE Systems) began operations in the city in 1962. IBM followed in 1967, opening a facility to produce its Selectric typewriters. Texas Instruments was set up in Austin two years later, and Motorola (now NXP Semiconductors) started semiconductor chip manufacturing in 1974. A number of Fortune 500 companies have headquarters or regional offices in Austin, including 3M, Advanced Micro Devices (AMD), Agilent Technologies, Amazon, Apple, CrowdStrike, Dell, Expedia, Meta Platforms, General Motors, Google, IBM, Intel, NXP Semiconductors, Oracle, Tesla, and Texas Instruments. Austin is the home of the University of Texas at Austin, one of the largest universities in the U.S., with over 50,000 students. In 2021, Austin became home to Austin FC, the first (and currently only) major professional sports team in the city.

== History ==
Austin, Travis County and Williamson County have been the site of human habitation since at least 9200 BC. The area's earliest known inhabitants lived during the late Pleistocene (Ice Age) and are linked to the Clovis culture around 9200 BC (over 11,200 years ago), based on evidence found throughout the area and documented at the much-studied Gault Site, midway between Georgetown and Fort Hood. Excavations at the French Legation in downtown Austin revealed a site utilized during the Archaic period of North America, about 5,000 years ago. Artifacts dating to the Paleo-Indians period show possible use as early as 9,000 years ago.

Spanish colonists traveled through the area, though few permanent settlements were created for some time. The Espinosa-Olivares-Aguirre expedition of 1709 reached the Colorado River near today's Austin hoping to meet with the Tejas Indians (Hasinai). It was met by members of a number of Indigenous Peoples: Yojuan (AKA Yojuane), Simomo, and Tusonibi. Guides for the expedition included Indigenous Peoples they had encountered just previously living near San Pedro Springs: Chaularame, Payaya, Sana, Sijame, and Siupan. With orders not to cross the Colorado the expedition returned to Mexico.

In 1730, three Catholic missions from East Texas were combined and reestablished as one mission on the south side of the Colorado River, in what is now Zilker Park, in Austin. The mission was in this area for only about seven months, then was moved to San Antonio de Béxar and split into three missions.

Many of the Indigenous Peoples the Spanish met on early expeditions, for example the Payaya, are classified as Coahuiltecan. Today Coahuiltecan descendants include Austin's Barton Springs among the four springs part of their creation story dating to prehistoric times; these springs are Comal Springs, Barton Springs, San Marcos Springs and San Antonio Springs. While there are many other tribes associated with Austin, Central Texas, of which Austin is a part, was not the long-term ancestral homeland of the ethnographically well-known Comanche, Kiowa, Lipan Apache, Waco (a branch of the Wichita) or even the Tonkawa, all having arrived in Central Texas just before or during the early European contact period.

During the 1830s, pioneers began to settle the area in central Austin along the Colorado River. Spanish forts were established in what are now Bastrop and San Marcos. Following Mexico's independence, new settlements were established in Central Texas.

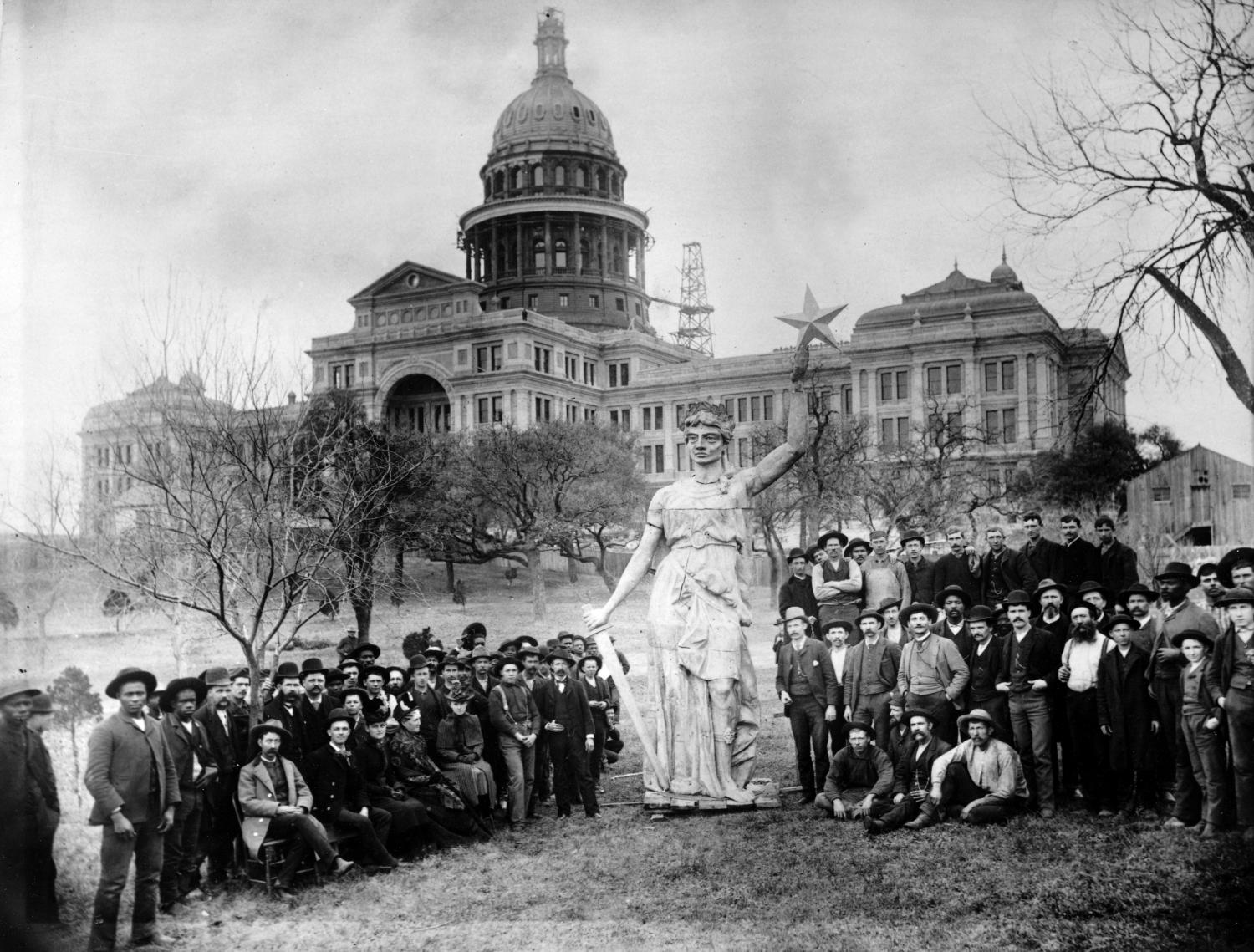
Statue of the Goddess of Liberty on the Texas State Capitol grounds, prior to installation atop the rotunda

In 1835–1836, Texans fought and won independence from Mexico. Texas thus became an independent country with its own president, congress, and monetary system. In 1839, the Texas Congress formed a commission to seek a site for the new capital of the Republic of Texas to replace Houston. When he was Vice President of Texas, Mirabeau B. Lamar had visited the area during a buffalo-hunting expedition between 1837 and 1838. He advised the commissioners to consider the area on the north bank of the Colorado River (near the present-day Congress Avenue Bridge), noting the area's hills, waterways, and pleasant surroundings. It was seen as a convenient crossroads for trade routes between Santa Fe and Galveston Bay, as well as routes between Northern Mexico and the Red River. In 1839, the site was chosen, and briefly incorporated under the name "Waterloo". Shortly afterward, the name was changed to Austin in honor of Stephen F. Austin, the "Father of Texas" and the republic's first secretary of state.

The city grew throughout the 19th century and became a center for government and education with the construction of the Texas State Capitol and the University of Texas at Austin.

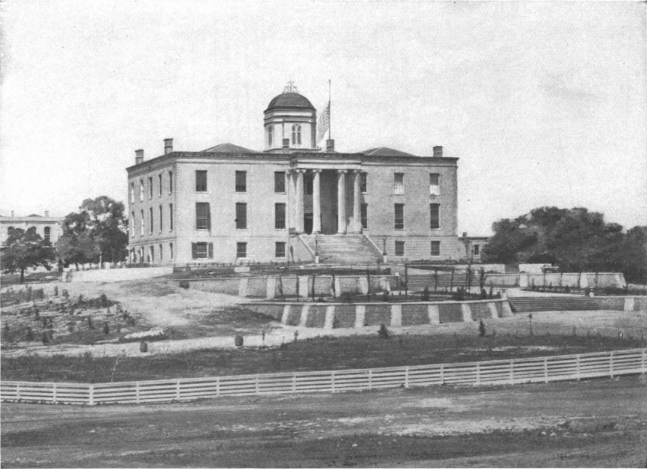
Second capitol building in Austin

Edwin Waller was picked by Lamar to survey the village and draft a plan laying out the new capital. The original site was narrowed to 640 acres (260 ha) that fronted the Colorado River between two creeks, Shoal Creek and Waller Creek, which was later named in his honor. Waller and a team of surveyors developed Austin's first city plan, commonly known as the Waller Plan, dividing the site into a 14-block grid plan bisected by a broad north–south thoroughfare, Congress Avenue, running up from the river to Capital Square, where the new Texas State Capitol was to be constructed. A temporary one-story capitol was erected on the corner of Colorado and 8th Streets. On August 1, 1839, the first auction of 217 out of 306 lots total was held. The Waller Plan designed and surveyed now forms the basis of downtown Austin.

Initially, the new capital thrived but Lamar's political enemy, Sam Houston, used two Mexican army incursions to San Antonio as an excuse to move the government. Sam Houston fought bitterly against Lamar's decision to establish the capital in such a remote wilderness. The men and women who traveled mainly from Houston to conduct government business were intensely disappointed as well. By 1840, the population had risen to 856, nearly half of whom fled Austin when Congress recessed. The resident African American population listed in January of this same year was 176. The fear of Austin's proximity to the Indians and Mexico, which still considered Texas a part of their land, created an immense motive for Sam Houston, the first and third President of the Republic of Texas, to relocate the capital once again in 1841. Upon threats of Mexican troops in Texas, Houston raided the Land Office to transfer all official documents to Houston for safe keeping in what was later known as the Archive War, but the people of Austin would not allow this unaccompanied decision to be executed. The documents stayed, but the capital would temporarily move from Austin to Houston to Washington-on-the-Brazos. Without the governmental body, Austin's population declined to a low of only a few hundred people throughout the early 1840s. The voting by the fourth President of the Republic, Anson Jones, and Congress, who reconvened in Austin in 1845, settled the issue to keep Austin the seat of government, as well as annex the Republic of Texas into the United States.

In 1860, 38% of Travis County residents were slaves. In 1861, with the outbreak of the American Civil War, voters in Austin and other Central Texas communities voted against secession. However, as the war progressed and fears of attack by Union forces increased, Austin contributed hundreds of men to the Confederate forces, albeit often via Confederate conscription laws, not popular with many Texans. Some Austinites, like prominent lawyer and businessman, Josiah Fisk, namesake of Fiskville, left Texas when threatened with conscription. Some opted trying to avoid conscription by hiding in remote locations such as Hamilton Pool. Others mounted armed resistance to the Confederacy.

The African American population of Austin swelled dramatically after the enforcement of the Emancipation Proclamation in Texas by Union General Gordon Granger at Galveston, in an event commemorated as Juneteenth. Black communities such as Wheatville, Pleasant Hill, and Clarksville were established, with Clarksville being the oldest surviving freedomtown ‒ the original post-Civil War settlements founded by former African-American slaves ‒ west of the Mississippi River. In 1870, blacks made up 36.5% of Austin's population.

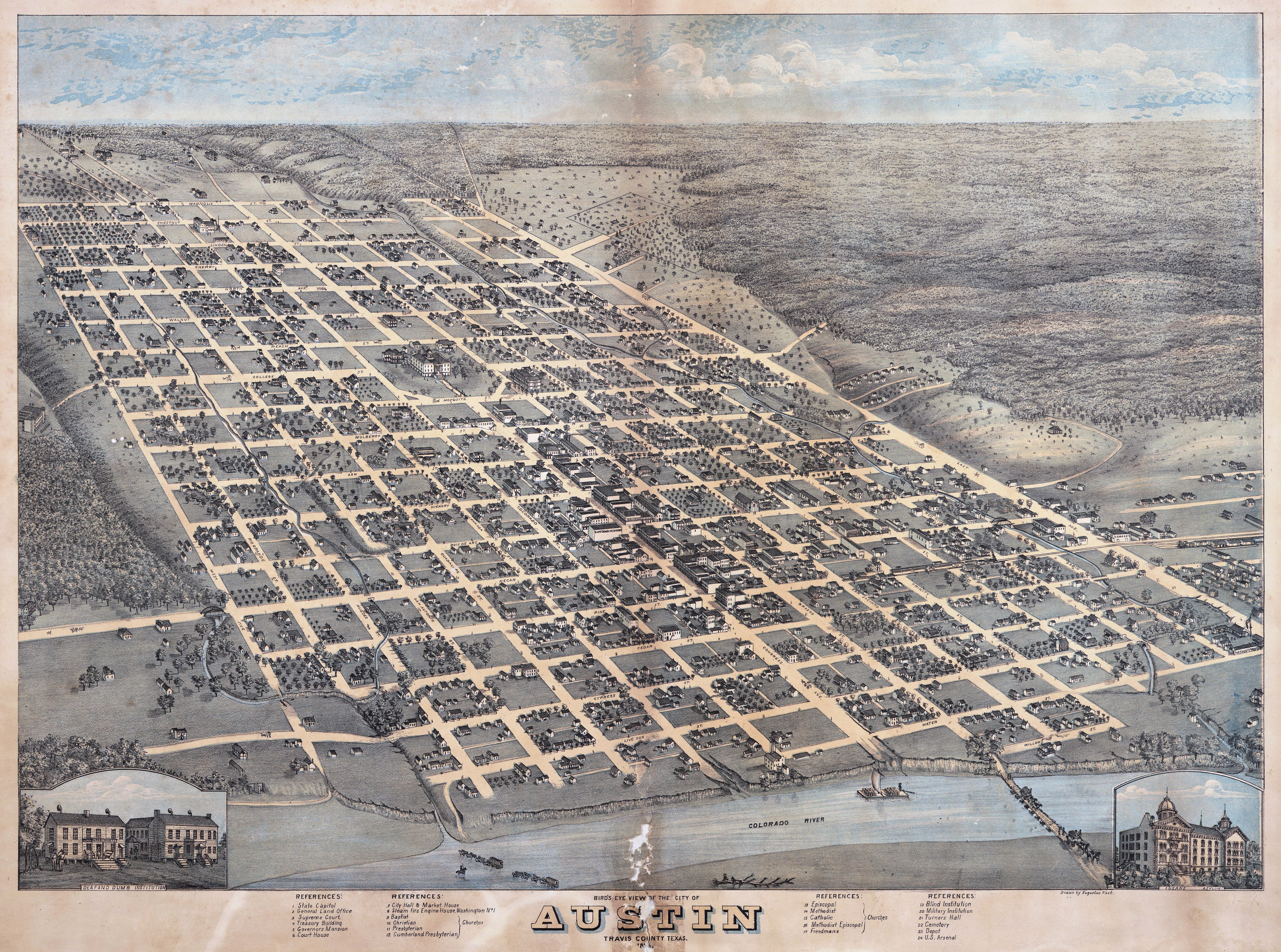
An 1873 illustration of Edwin Waller's layout for Austin

The postwar period saw dramatic population and economic growth. The opening of the Houston and Texas Central Railway (H&TC) in 1871 turned Austin into the major trading center for the region, with the ability to transport both cotton and cattle. The Missouri, Kansas & Texas (MKT) line followed close behind. By the mid-1870s, Austin also had a small Chinese community; the city’s 1875 census recorded 20 Chinese men, many of whom had previously worked on railroad construction in California and Mexico.Austin was also the terminus of the southernmost leg of the Chisholm Trail, and "drovers" pushed cattle north to the railroad. Cotton was one of the few crops produced locally for export, and a cotton gin engine was located downtown near the trains for "ginning" cotton of its seeds and turning the product into bales for shipment. However, as other new railroads were built through the region in the 1870s, Austin began to lose its primacy in trade to the surrounding communities. In addition, the areas east of Austin took over cattle and cotton production from Austin, especially in towns like Hutto and Taylor that sit over the blackland prairie, with its deep, rich soils for producing cotton and hay.

In September 1881, Austin public schools held their first classes. The same year, Tillotson Collegiate and Normal Institute (now part of Huston–Tillotson University) opened its doors. The University of Texas held its first classes in 1883, although classes had been held in the original wooden state capitol for four years before.

During the 1880s, Austin gained new prominence as the state capitol building was completed in 1888 and claimed as the seventh largest building in the world. In the late 19th century, Austin expanded its city limits to more than three times its former area, and the first granite dam was built on the Colorado River to power a new street car line and the new "moon towers". The first dam washed away in a flood on April 7, 1900.

In the late 1920s and 1930s, Austin implemented the 1928 Austin city plan through a series of civic development and beautification projects that created much of the city's infrastructure and many of its parks. In addition, the state legislature established the Lower Colorado River Authority (LCRA) that, along with the city of Austin, created the system of dams along the Colorado River to form the Highland Lakes. These projects were enabled in large part because the Public Works Administration provided Austin with greater funding for municipal construction projects than other Texas cities.

During the early 20th century, a three-way system of social segregation emerged in Austin, with Anglos, African Americans and Mexicans being separated by custom or law in most aspects of life, including housing, health care, and education. Deed restrictions also played an important role in residential segregation. After 1935 most housing deeds prohibited African Americans (and sometimes other nonwhite groups) from using land. Combined with the system of segregated public services, racial segregation increased in Austin during the first half of the twentieth century, with African Americans and Mexicans experiencing high levels of discrimination and social marginalization.

In 1940, the destroyed granite dam on the Colorado River was finally replaced by a hollow concrete dam that formed Lake McDonald (now called Lake Austin) and which has withstood all floods since. In addition, the much larger Mansfield Dam was built by the LCRA upstream of Austin to form Lake Travis, a flood-control reservoir.

In the early 20th century, the Texas Oil Boom took hold, creating tremendous economic opportunities in Southeast Texas and North Texas. The growth generated by this boom largely passed by Austin at first, with the city slipping from fourth largest to tenth largest in Texas between 1880 and 1920.

After a severe lull in economic growth from the Great Depression, Austin resumed its steady development. Following the mid-20th century, Austin became established as one of Texas' major metropolitan centers. In 1970, the U.S. Census Bureau reported Austin's population as 14.5% Hispanic, 11.9% black, and 73.4% non-Hispanic white. In the late 20th century, Austin emerged as an important high tech center for semiconductors and software. The University of Texas at Austin emerged as a major university.

The 1970s saw Austin's emergence in the national music scene, with local artists such as Willie Nelson, Asleep at the Wheel, Eric Johnson and Stevie Ray Vaughan and iconic music venues such as the Armadillo World Headquarters. Over time, the long-running television program Austin City Limits, its namesake Austin City Limits Festival, and the South by Southwest music festival solidified the city's place in the music industry.

== Geography ==
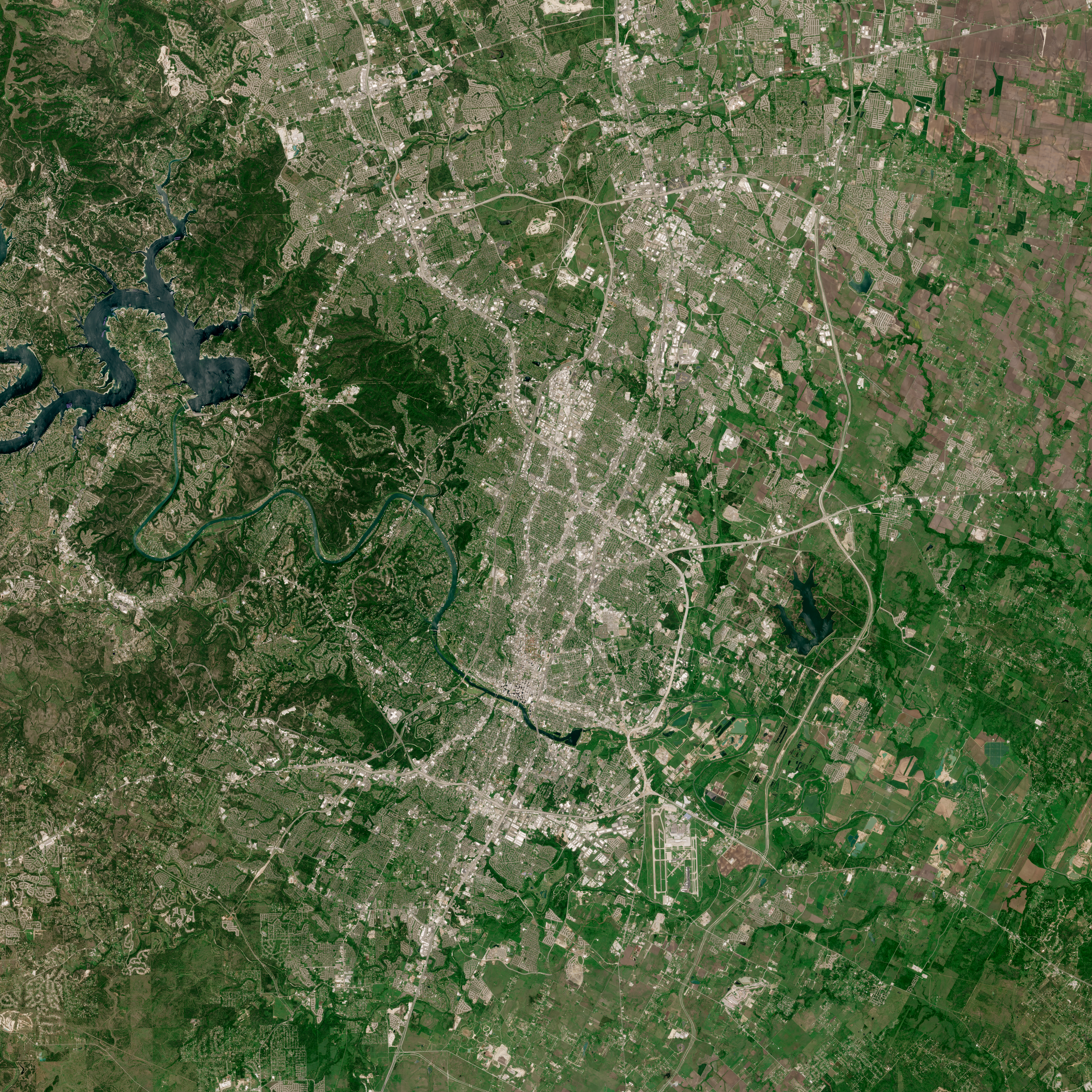
Austin as seen from space, 2020

Austin, the southernmost state capital of the contiguous 48 states, is located in Central Texas on the Colorado River. Austin is 146 miles (230 km) northwest of Houston, 182 miles (290 km) south of Dallas, and 74 miles (120 km) northeast of San Antonio.

Austin occupies a total area of 305.1 square miles (790.1 km^{2}). Approximately 7.2 square miles (18.6 km^{2}) of this area is water. Austin is situated at the foot of the Balcones Escarpment, on the Colorado River, with three artificial lakes within the city limits: Lady Bird Lake (formerly known as Town Lake), Lake Austin (both created by dams along the Colorado River), and Lake Walter E. Long that is partly used for cooling water for the Decker Power Plant. Mansfield Dam and the foot of Lake Travis are located within the city's limits. Lady Bird Lake, Lake Austin, and Lake Travis are each on the Colorado River.

The elevation of Austin varies from 425 feet (130 m) to approximately 1,000 feet (305 m) above sea level. Due to the fact it straddles the Balcones Fault, much of the eastern part of the city is flat, with heavy clay and loam soils, whereas the western part and western suburbs consist of rolling hills on the edge of the Texas Hill Country. Because the hills to the west are primarily limestone rock with a thin covering of topsoil, portions of the city are frequently subjected to flash floods from the runoff caused by thunderstorms. To help control this runoff and to generate hydroelectric power, the Lower Colorado River Authority operates a series of dams that form the Texas Highland Lakes. The lakes also provide venues for boating, swimming, and other forms of recreation within several parks on the lake shores.

Austin is located at the intersection of four major ecological regions, and is consequently a temperate-to-hot green oasis with a highly variable climate having some characteristics of the desert, the tropics, and a wetter climate. The area is very diverse ecologically and biologically, and is home to a variety of animals and plants. Notably, the area is home to many types of wildflowers that blossom throughout the year but especially in the spring. This includes the popular bluebonnets, some planted by "Lady Bird" Johnson, wife of former President Lyndon B. Johnson.

The soils of Austin range from shallow, gravelly clay loams over limestone in the western outskirts to deep, fine sandy loams, silty clay loams, silty clays or clays in the city's eastern part. Some of the clays have pronounced shrink-swell properties and are difficult to work under most moisture conditions. Many of Austin's soils, especially the clay-rich types, are slightly to moderately alkaline and have free calcium carbonate.

=== Cityscape ===
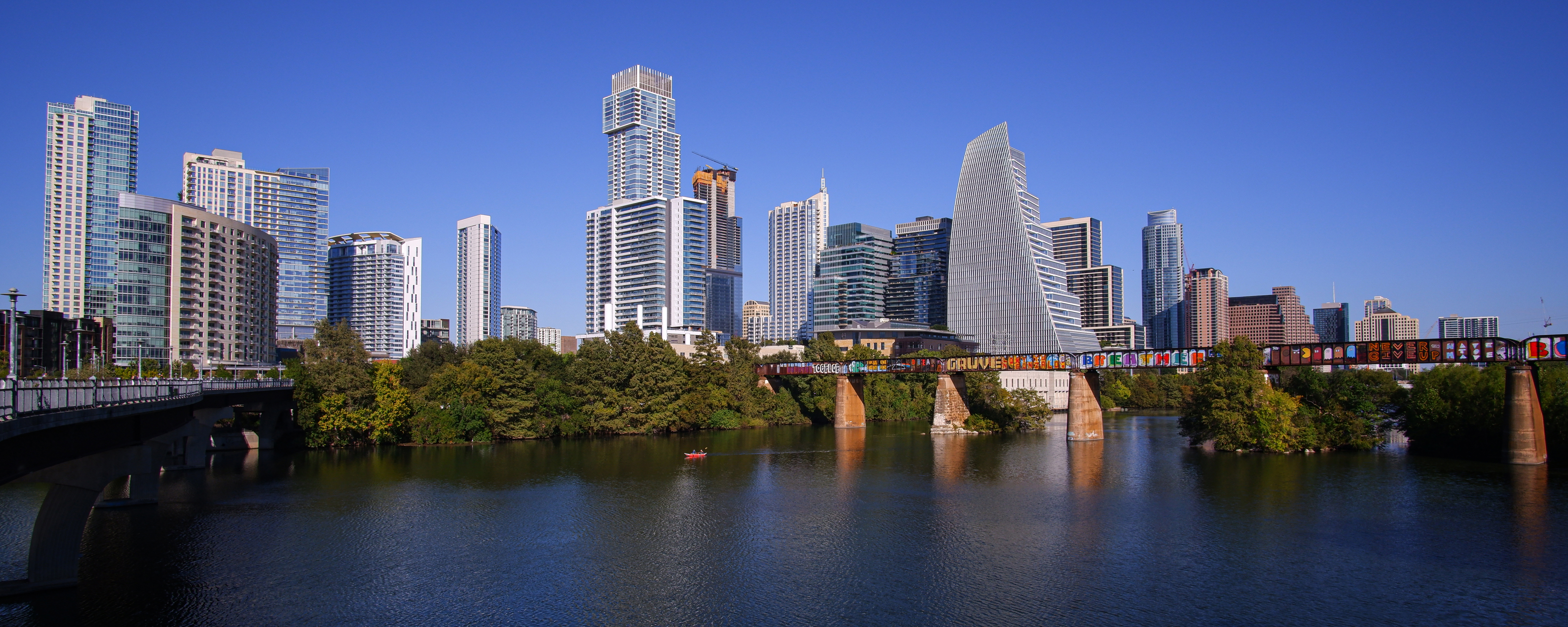
Downtown Austin, Texas from across the Colorado River, October 2022

Austin's skyline historically was modest, dominated by the Texas State Capitol and the University of Texas Main Building. However, since the 2000s, many new high-rise towers have been constructed. Austin is currently undergoing a skyscraper boom, which includes recent construction on new office, hotel and residential buildings. Downtown's buildings are somewhat spread out, partly due to a set of zoning restrictions that preserve the view of the Texas State Capitol from various locations around Austin, known as the Capitol View Corridors.

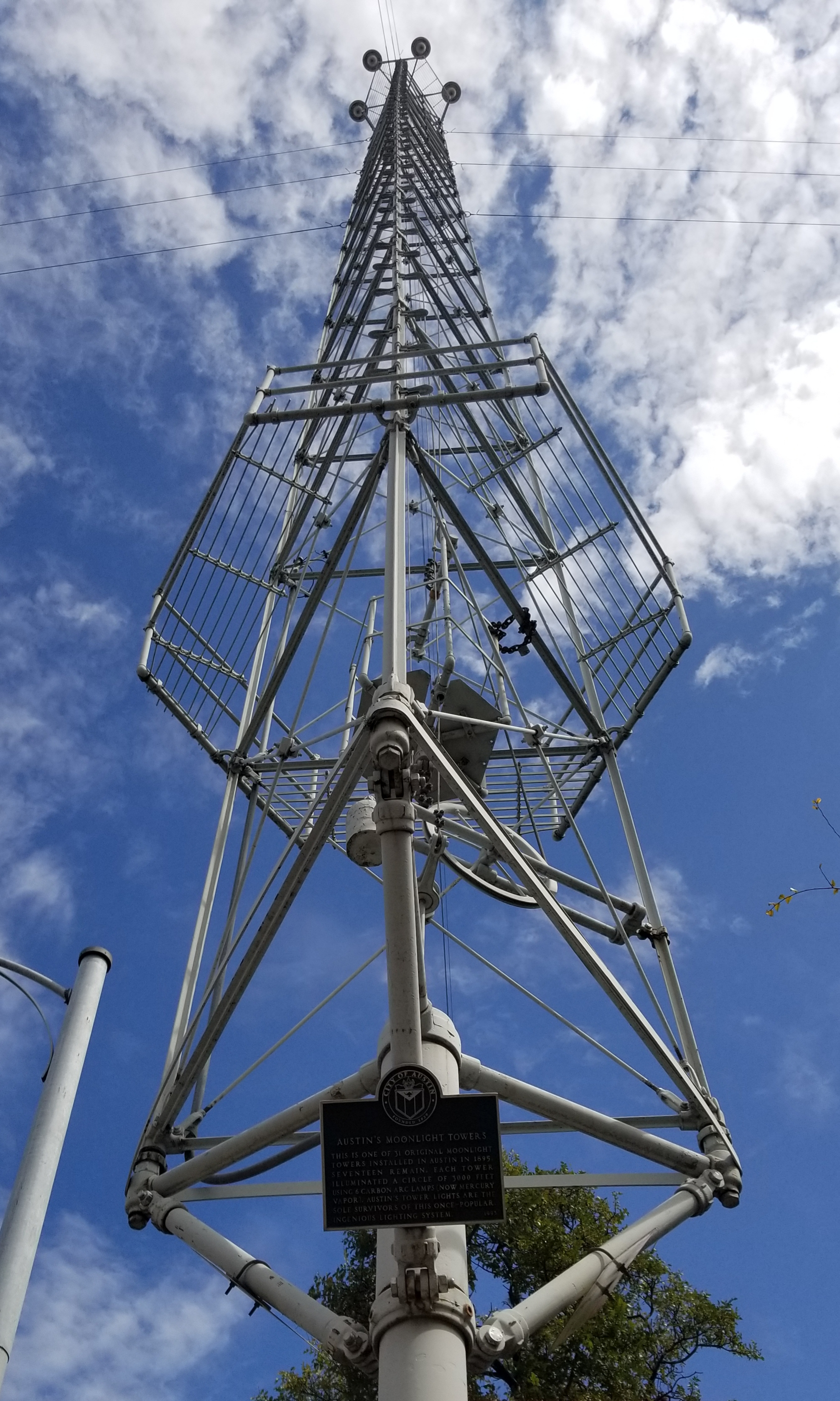
One of the 15 remaining moonlight towers in Austin

At night, parts of Austin are lit by "artificial moonlight" from moonlight towers built to illuminate the central part of the city. The 165-foot (50 m) moonlight towers were built in the late 19th century and are now recognized as historic landmarks. Only 15 of the 31 original innovative towers remain standing in Austin, but none remain in any of the other cities where they were installed. The towers are featured in the 1993 film Dazed and Confused.

In December 2023, amid rising home prices, the Austin City Council loosened the city's zoning rules to permit by-right development of triplexes on lots zoned for single family housing and loosened restrictions on tiny homes.

==== Downtown ====
The central business district of Austin is home to the tallest condo towers in the state, with The Independent (58 stories and 690 ft (210 m) tall) and The Austonian (topping out at 56 floors and 685 ft (209 m) tall). The Independent became the tallest all-residential building in the U.S. west of Chicago when topped out in 2018. In 2005, then-Mayor Will Wynn set out a goal of having 25,000 people living downtown by 2015. Although downtown's growth did not meet this goal, downtown's residential population did surge from an estimated 5,000 in 2005 to 12,000 in 2015. The skyline has drastically changed in recent years, and the residential real estate market has remained relatively strong. As of December 2016, there were 31 high rise projects either under construction, approved or planned to be completed in Austin's downtown core between 2017 and 2020. Sixteen of those were set to rise above 400 ft (120 m) tall, including four above 600', and eight above 500'. An additional 15 towers were slated to stand between 300' and 399' tall.

=== Climate ===
Austin

Climate chart (precipitation, max. and min. temperature)
J	F	M	A	M	J	J	A	S	O	N	D
2.6 63 42	1.9 67 46	2.9 73 52	2.4 80 59	5 87 67	3.7 93 73	2 97 75	2.7 98 75	3.5 91 70	3.9 83 61	2.9 72 51	2.7 64 43
- █ Average max. and min. temperatures in °F
- █ Precipitation totals in inches
Metric conversion
J	F	M	A	M	J	J	A	S	O	N	D
67 17 5	48 19 8	73 23 11	61 27 15	128 31 19	93 34 23	50 36 24	70 37 24	88 33 21	99 28 16	74 22 10	69 18 6
- █ Average max. and min. temperatures in °C
- █ Precipitation totals in mm

Austin is located within the middle of a unique, narrow transitional zone between the dry deserts of the American Southwest and the lush, green, more humid regions of the American Southeast. Its climate, topography, and vegetation share characteristics of both. Officially, Austin has a humid subtropical climate (Cfa under the Köppen climate classification, Cfhl under the Trewartha climate classification). This climate is typified by long, very hot summers, short, mild winters, and warm to hot spring and fall seasons in-between. Austin averages 34.32 inches (872 mm) of annual rainfall distributed mostly evenly throughout the year, though spring and fall are the wettest seasons. Sunshine is common during all seasons, with 2,650 hours, or 60.3% of the possible total, of bright sunshine per year.

Summers in Austin are very hot, with average July and August highs frequently reaching 35 °C (95 °F) or above. Highs reach 90 °F (32 °C) on 123 days per year, of which 29 days reach 100 °F (38 °C); all years in the 1991-2020 period recorded at least 1 day of the latter. The average daytime high is 70 °F (21 °C) or warmer between March 1 and November 21, rising to 80 °F (27 °C) or warmer between April 14 and October 24, and reaching 90 °F (32 °C) or warmer between May 30 and September 18. The highest ever recorded temperature was 112 °F (44 °C) occurring on September 5, 2000, and August 28, 2011. An uncommon characteristic of Austin's climate is its highly variable humidity, which fluctuates frequently depending on the shifting patterns of air flow and wind direction. It is common for a lengthy series of warm, dry, low-humidity days to be occasionally interrupted by very warm and humid days, and vice versa. Humidity rises with winds from the east or southeast, when the air drifts inland from the Gulf of Mexico, but decreases significantly with winds from the west or southwest, bringing air flowing from Chihuahuan Desert areas of West Texas or Northern Mexico.

Winters in Austin are mild, although occasional short-lived bursts of cold weather known as "Blue Northers" can occur. January is the coolest month with an average daytime high of 62.5 °F (17 °C). The overnight low drops to or below freezing 12 times per year, and sinks below 45 °F (7 °C) during 76 evenings per year, mostly between mid-December and mid-February. The average first and last dates for a freeze are December 1 and February 15, giving Austin an average growing season of 288 days, and the coldest temperature of the year is normally about 24.2 °F (−4 °C) under the 1991-2020 climate normals, putting Austin in USDA zone 9a.

Conversely, winter months also produce warm days on a regular basis. On average, 10 days in January reach or exceed 70 °F (21 °C) and 1 day reaches 80 °F (27 °C); during the 1991-2020 period, all Januarys had at least 1 day with a high of 70 °F (21 °C) or more, and most (60%) had at least 1 day with a high of 80 °F (27 °C) or more. The lowest ever recorded temperature in the city was −2 °F (−19 °C) on January 31, 1949. Roughly every two years Austin experiences an ice storm that freezes roads over and cripples travel in the city for 24 to 48 hours. When Austin received 0.04 inches (1 mm) of ice on January 24, 2014, there were 278 vehicular collisions. Similarly, snowfall is rare in Austin. A snow event of 0.9 inches (2 cm) on February 4, 2011, caused more than 300 car crashes. The most recent major snow event occurred February 14–15, 2021, when 6.4 inches (16 cm) of snow fell at Austin's Camp Mabry, the largest two-day snowfall since records began being kept in 1948.

Typical of Central Texas, severe weather in Austin is a threat that can strike during any season. However, it is most common during the spring. According to most classifications, Austin lies within the extreme southern periphery of Tornado Alley, although many sources place Austin outside of Tornado Alley altogether. Consequently, tornadoes strike Austin less frequently than areas farther to the north. However, severe weather and/or supercell thunderstorms can occur multiple times per year, bringing damaging winds, lightning, heavy rain, and occasional flash flooding to the city. The deadliest storm to ever strike city limits was the twin tornadoes storm of May 4, 1922, while the deadliest tornado outbreak to ever strike the metro area was the Central Texas tornado outbreak of May 27, 1997.

Climate data for Camp Mabry, Austin, Texas (1991–2020 normals, (Note: Mean monthly maxima and minima (i.e. the highest and lowest temperature readings during an entire month or year) calculated based on data at said location from 1991 to 2020.) extremes 1897–present) (Note: Official records for Austin were kept at downtown from September 1897 to July 1942, Mueller Airport from August 1942 to June 1999, and at Camp Mabry since July 1999. For more information, see Threadex)
Month	Jan	Feb	Mar	Apr	May	Jun	Jul	Aug	Sep	Oct	Nov	Dec	Year
Record high °F (°C)	90 (32)	99 (37)	98 (37)	99 (37)	104 (40)	109 (43)	109 (43)	112 (44)	112 (44)	101 (38)	93 (34)	90 (32)	112 (44)
Mean maximum °F (°C)	80.1 (26.7)	84.2 (29.0)	87.7 (30.9)	91.8 (33.2)	95.5 (35.3)	99.5 (37.5)	102.3 (39.1)	103.9 (39.9)	99.9 (37.7)	93.7 (34.3)	85.3 (29.6)	80.5 (26.9)	105.3 (40.7)
Mean daily maximum °F (°C)	62.5 (16.9)	66.5 (19.2)	73.3 (22.9)	80.3 (26.8)	86.9 (30.5)	93.2 (34.0)	96.6 (35.9)	97.8 (36.6)	91.4 (33.0)	82.5 (28.1)	71.5 (21.9)	63.9 (17.7)	80.5 (26.9)
Daily mean °F (°C)	52.2 (11.2)	56.1 (13.4)	62.8 (17.1)	69.6 (20.9)	76.8 (24.9)	83.0 (28.3)	85.8 (29.9)	86.5 (30.3)	80.8 (27.1)	71.6 (22.0)	61.0 (16.1)	53.6 (12.0)	70.0 (21.1)
Mean daily minimum °F (°C)	41.8 (5.4)	45.8 (7.7)	52.2 (11.2)	58.9 (14.9)	66.8 (19.3)	72.9 (22.7)	75.0 (23.9)	75.1 (23.9)	70.1 (21.2)	60.8 (16.0)	50.5 (10.3)	43.4 (6.3)	59.4 (15.2)
Mean minimum °F (°C)	27.1 (−2.7)	30.3 (−0.9)	34.8 (1.6)	42.8 (6.0)	53.4 (11.9)	65.0 (18.3)	70.1 (21.2)	69.3 (20.7)	58.5 (14.7)	43.7 (6.5)	33.8 (1.0)	28.6 (−1.9)	24.2 (−4.3)
Record low °F (°C)	−2 (−19)	−1 (−18)	18 (−8)	30 (−1)	40 (4)	51 (11)	57 (14)	58 (14)	41 (5)	30 (−1)	20 (−7)	4 (−16)	−2 (−19)
Average precipitation inches (mm)	2.64 (67)	1.89 (48)	2.88 (73)	2.42 (61)	5.04 (128)	3.68 (93)	1.96 (50)	2.74 (70)	3.45 (88)	3.91 (99)	2.92 (74)	2.72 (69)	36.25 (921)
Average snowfall inches (cm)	0.0 (0.0)	0.2 (0.51)	0.0 (0.0)	0.0 (0.0)	0.0 (0.0)	0.0 (0.0)	0.0 (0.0)	0.0 (0.0)	0.0 (0.0)	0.0 (0.0)	0.0 (0.0)	0.0 (0.0)	0.2 (0.51)
Average precipitation days (≥ 0.01 in)	7.6	7.7	8.9	7.1	8.9	7.4	4.9	4.8	7.1	7.0	6.9	7.5	85.8
Average snowy days (≥ 0.1 in)	0.2	0.3	0.0	0.0	0.0	0.0	0.0	0.0	0.0	0.0	0.0	0.1	0.6
Average relative humidity (%)	67.2	66.0	64.2	66.4	71.4	69.5	65.1	63.8	68.4	67.1	68.7	67.6	67.1
Average dew point °F (°C)	36.1 (2.3)	39.6 (4.2)	46.2 (7.9)	55.0 (12.8)	63.3 (17.4)	68.2 (20.1)	68.9 (20.5)	68.4 (20.2)	65.5 (18.6)	56.5 (13.6)	47.7 (8.7)	39.4 (4.1)	54.6 (12.5)
Mean monthly sunshine hours	163.8	169.3	205.9	205.8	227.1	285.5	317.2	297.9	233.8	215.6	168.3	153.5	2,643.7
Percentage possible sunshine	51	54	55	53	54	68	74	73	63	61	53	48	60
Average ultraviolet index	4	6	8	9	10	11	11	10	9	7	5	4	8
Source 1: NOAA (relative humidity and sun 1961–1990),
Source 2: Weather Atlas (UV index)

=== Natural disasters ===
==== 2011 drought ====
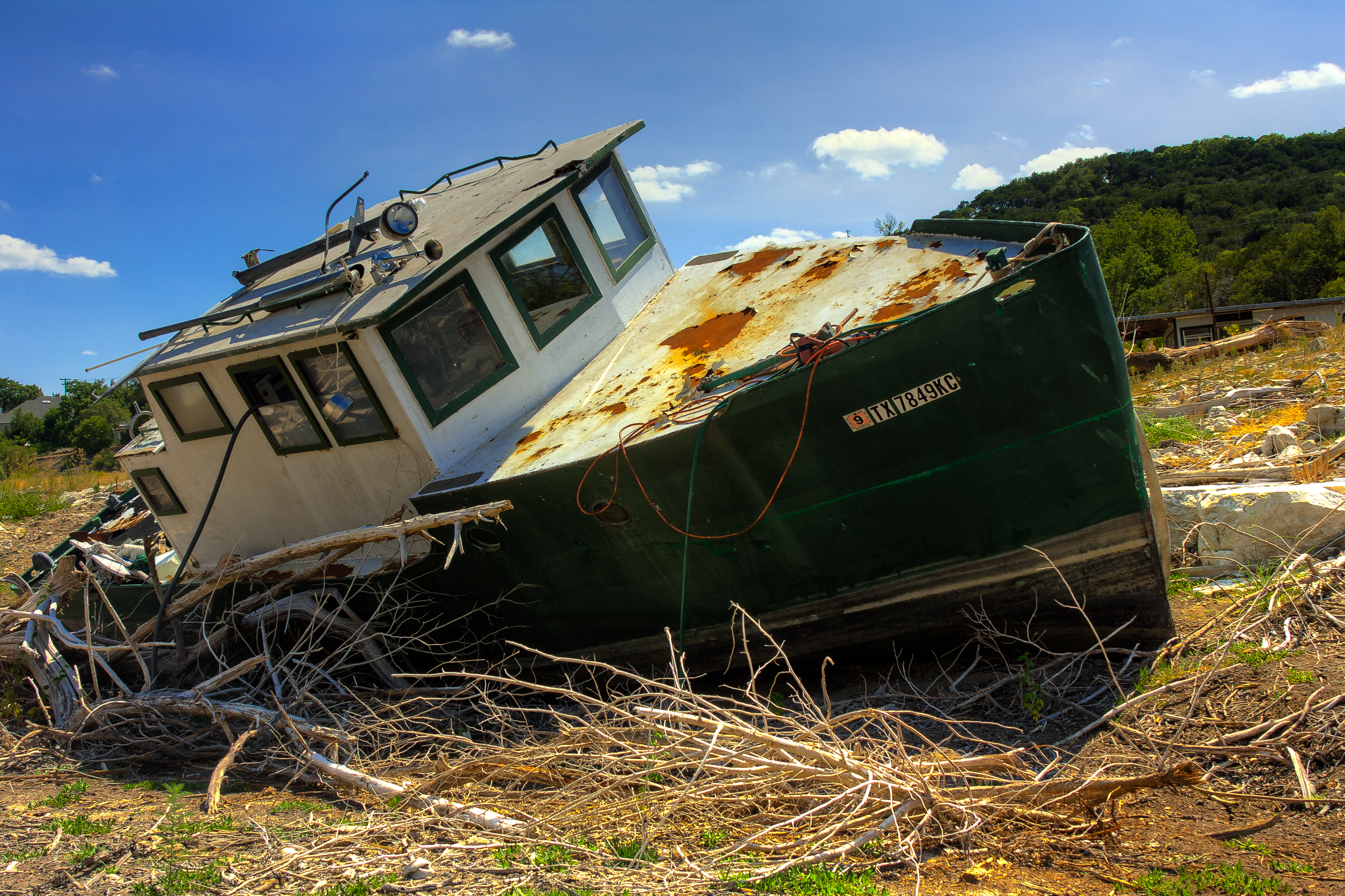
The 2011 Texas drought dried up many of central Texas' waterways. This boat was left to sit in the middle of what is normally a branch of Lake Travis, part of the Colorado River.

From October 2010 through September 2011, both major reporting stations in Austin, Camp Mabry and Bergstrom Int'l, had the least rainfall of a water year on record, receiving less than a third of normal precipitation. This was a result of La Niña conditions in the eastern Pacific Ocean where water was significantly cooler than normal. David Brown, a regional official with the National Oceanic and Atmospheric Administration, explained that "these kinds of droughts will have effects that are even more extreme in the future, given a warming and drying regional climate." The drought, coupled with exceedingly high temperatures throughout the summer of 2011, caused many wildfires throughout Texas, including notably the Bastrop County Complex Fire in neighboring Bastrop, Texas.

==== 2018 flooding and water crisis ====
In the fall of 2018, Austin and surrounding areas received heavy rainfall and flash flooding following Hurricane Sergio. The Lower Colorado River Authority opened four floodgates of the Mansfield Dam after Lake Travis was recorded at 146% full at 704.3 feet (214.7 m). From October 22 to October 29, 2018, the City of Austin issued a mandatory citywide boil-water advisory after the Highland Lakes, home to the city's main water supply, became overwhelmed by unprecedented amounts of silt, dirt, and debris that had washed in from the Llano River. Austin Water, the city's water utility, has the capacity to process up to 300 million gallons of water per day; however, the elevated level of turbidity reduced output to only 105 million gallons per day. Since Austin residents consumed an average of 120 million gallons of water per day, the infrastructure was not able to keep up with demand.

==== 2021 winter storm ====
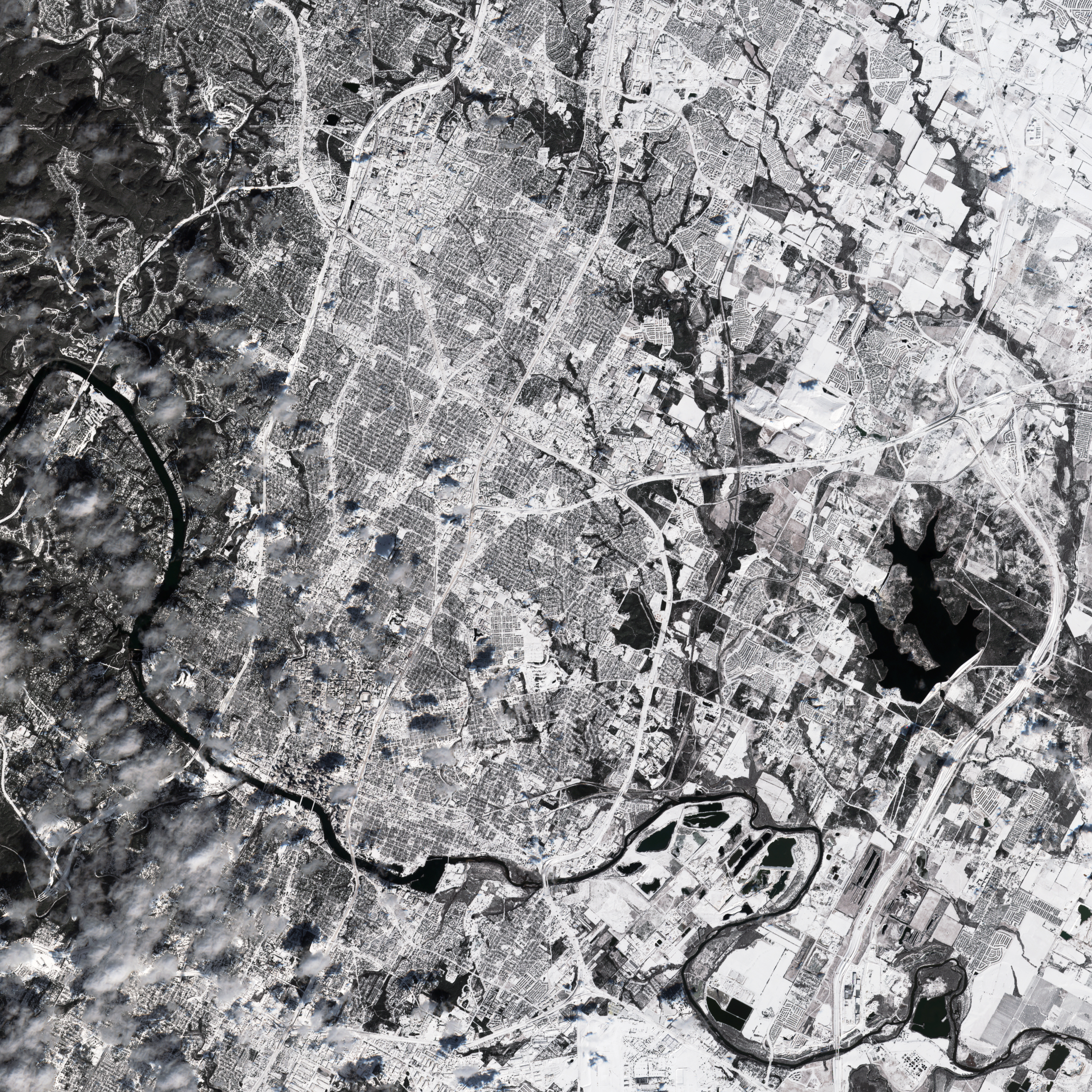
Austin covered in snow on February 15, 2021. Photo from ESA.

In February 2021, Winter Storm Uri dropped prolific amounts of snow across Texas and Oklahoma, including Austin. The Austin area received a total of 6.4 inches (160 mm) of snowfall between February 14 and 15, with snow cover persisting until February 20. This marked the longest time the area had had more than 1 inch (25 mm) of snow, with the previous longest time being three days in January 1985.

Lack of winterization in natural gas power plants, which supply a large amount of power to the Texas grid, and increased energy demand caused ERCOT and Austin Energy to enact rolling blackouts in order to avoid total grid collapse between February 15 and February 18. Initial rolling blackouts were to last for a maximum of 40 minutes, however lack of energy production caused many blackouts to last for much longer, at the peak of the blackouts an estimated 40% of Austin Energy homes were without power.

Starting on February 15, Austin Water received reports of pipe breaks, hourly water demand increased from 150 million gallons per day on February 15 to a peak hourly demand of 260 million gallons per day on February 16. On the morning of February 17 demand increased to 330 million gallons per day, the resulting drop of water pressure caused the Austin area to enter into a boil-water advisory which would last until water pressure was restored on February 23.

==== 2023 winter storm ====
Beginning January 30, 2023 the City of Austin experienced a winter freeze which left 170,000 Austin Energy customers without electricity or heat for several days. The slow pace of repairs and lack of public information from City officials frustrated many residents. A week after the freeze and when Austin City Council members were proposing to evaluate his employment, City Manager Spencer Cronk finally apologized. On Thursday February 16, 2023, Cronk was fired by the Austin City Council for the city's response to the winter storm. Former City Manager Jesus Garcia was named Interim City Manager.

=== Parks ===
The Austin Parks and Recreation Department received the Excellence in Aquatics award in 1999 and the Gold Medal Awards in 2004 from the National Recreation and Park Association.

To strengthen the region's parks system, which spans more than 29,000 acres (11,736 ha), The Austin Parks Foundation was established in 1992 to develop and improve parks in and around Austin. APF works to fill the city's park funding gap by leveraging volunteers, philanthropists, park advocates, and strategic collaborations to develop, maintain and enhance Austin's parks, trails and green spaces.

=== Lady Bird Lake ===
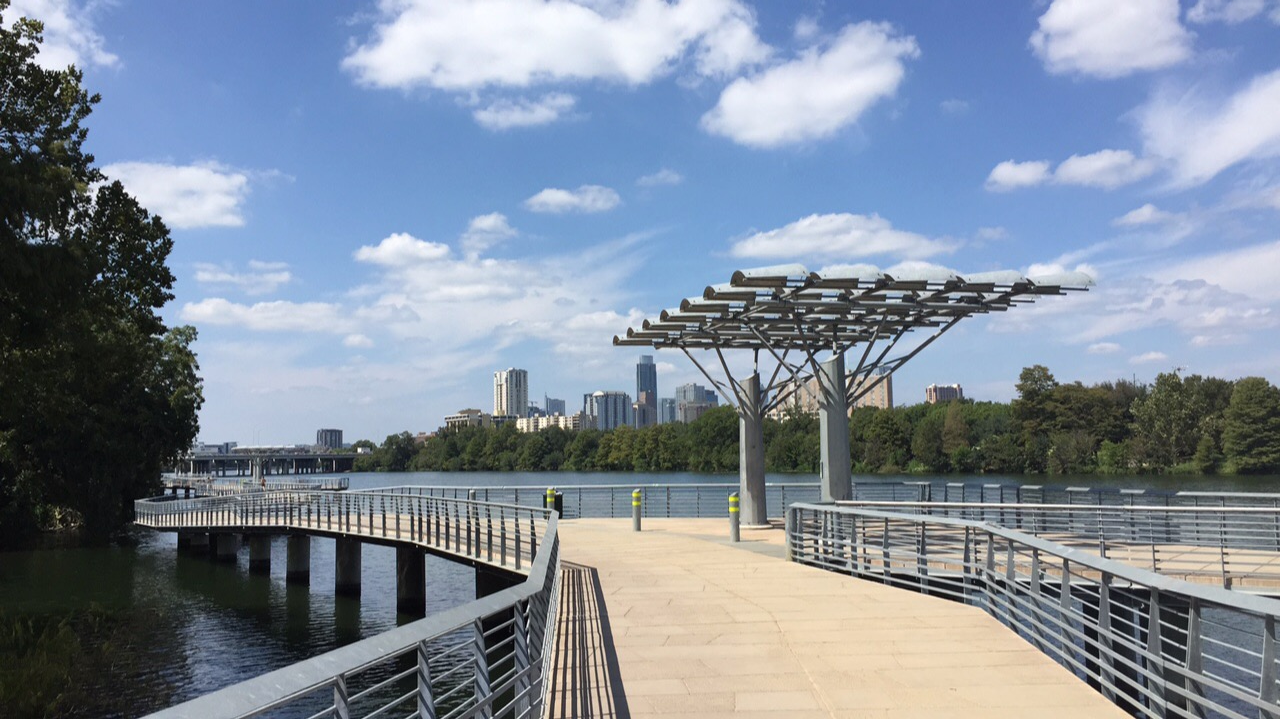
Ann and Roy Butler Hike-and-Bike Trail along Lady Bird Lake

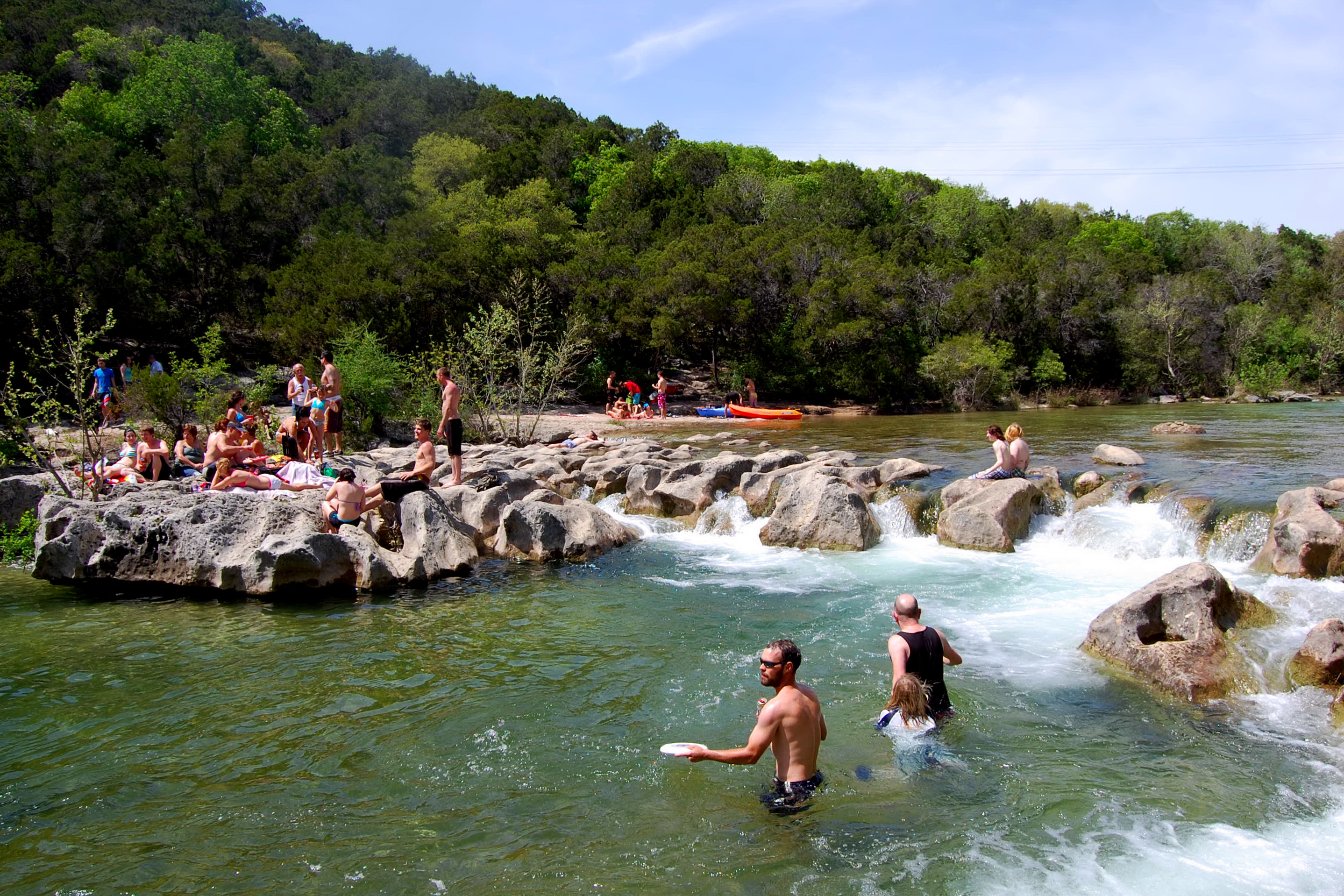
Sculpture Falls along the Barton Creek Greenbelt

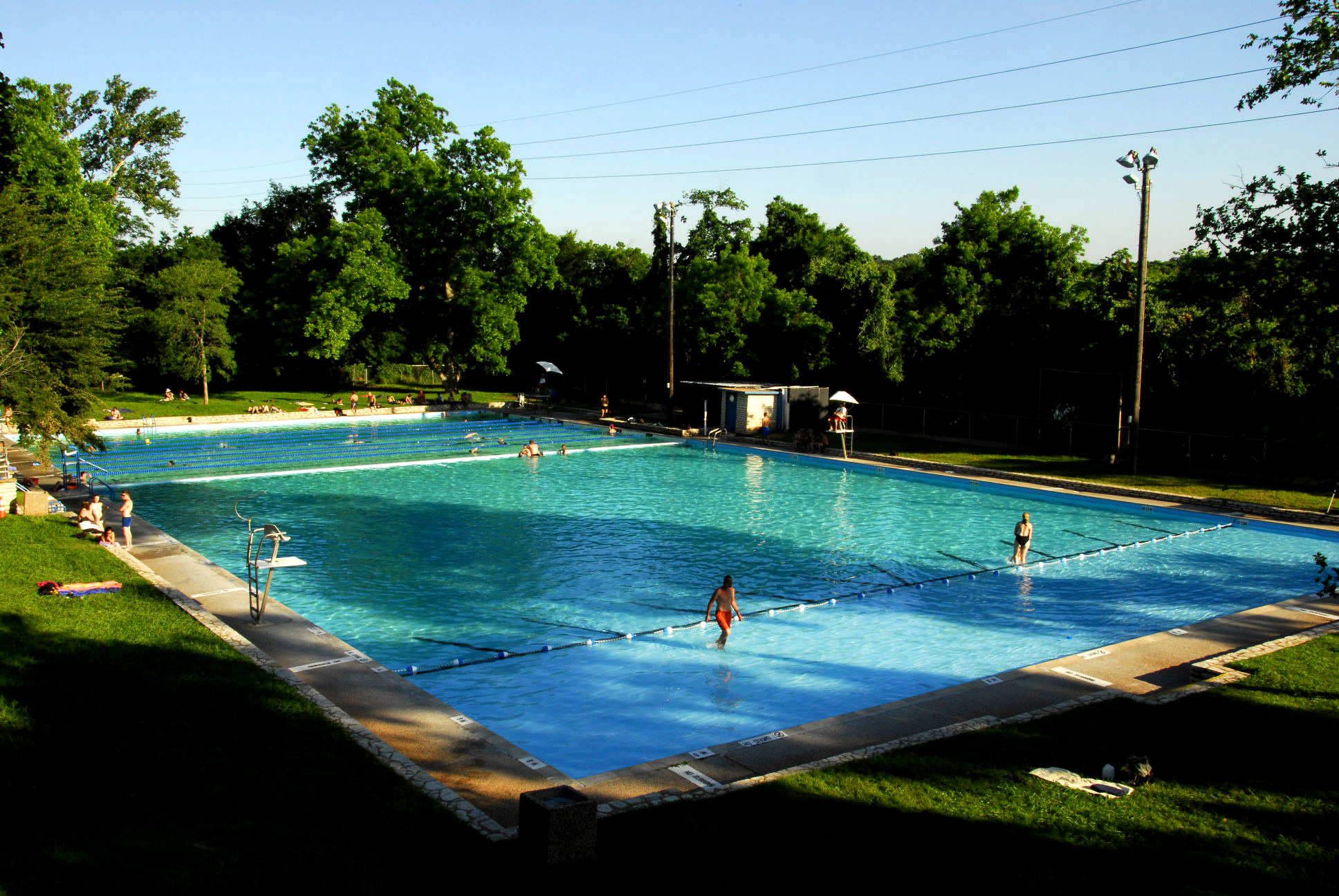
Austin's Deep Eddy Pool is the oldest human-made pool in Texas.

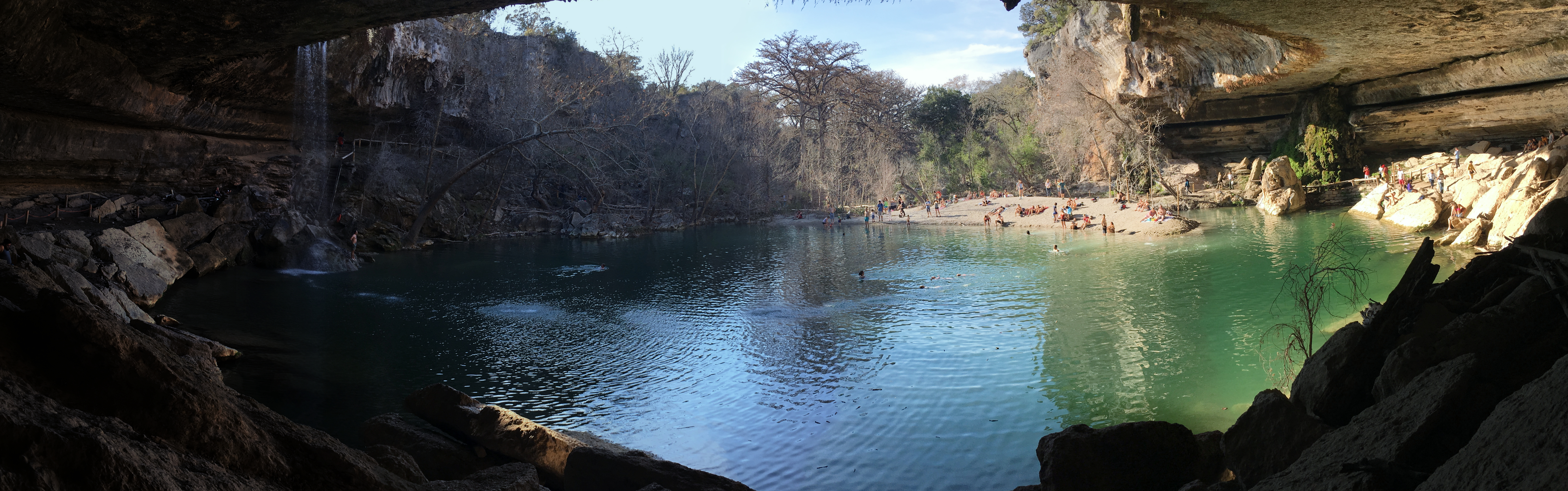
Hamilton Pool Preserve

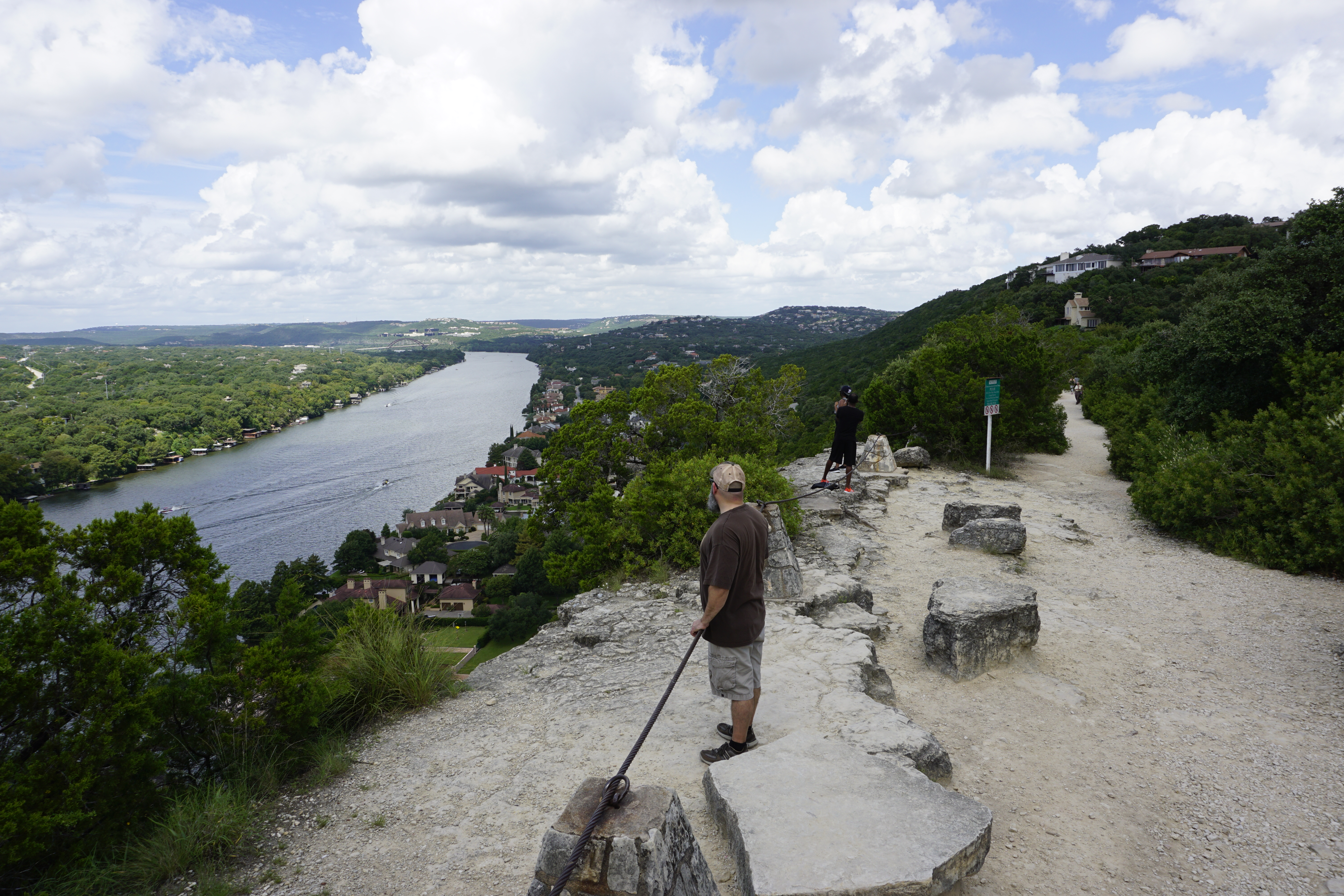
View of the Colorado River from Covert Park at Mount Bonnell

Lady Bird Lake (formerly Town Lake) is a river-like reservoir on the Colorado River. The lake is a popular recreational area for paddleboards, kayaks, canoes, dragon boats, and rowing shells. Austin's warm climate and the river's calm waters, nearly 6 miles (9.7 km) length and straight courses are especially popular with crew teams and clubs. Other recreational attractions along the shores of the lake include swimming in Deep Eddy Pool, the oldest swimming pool in Texas, and Red Bud Isle, a small island formed by the 1900 collapse of the McDonald Dam that serves as a recreation area with a dog park and access to the lake for canoeing and fishing. The 10.1 miles (16.3 km) Ann and Roy Butler Hike and Bike Trail forms a complete circuit around the lake. A local nonprofit, The Trail Foundation, is the Trail's private steward and has built amenities and infrastructure including trailheads, lakefront gathering areas, restrooms, exercise equipment, as well as doing Trailwide ecological restoration work on an ongoing basis. The Butler Trail loop was completed in 2014 with the public-private partnership 1-mile Boardwalk project.

Along the shores of Lady Bird Lake is the 350 acres (140 hectares) Zilker Park, which contains large open lawns, sports fields, cross country courses, historical markers, concession stands, and picnic areas. Zilker Park is also home to numerous attractions, including the Zilker Botanical Garden, the Umlauf Sculpture Garden, Zilker Hillside Theater, the Austin Nature & Science Center, and the Zilker Zephyr, a 12 in (305 mm) gauge miniature railway carries passengers on a tour around the park. Auditorium Shores, an urban park along the lake, is home to the Palmer Auditorium, the Long Center for the Performing Arts, and an off-leash dog park on the water. Both Zilker Park and Auditorium Shores have a direct view of the Downtown skyline.

=== Barton Creek Greenbelt ===
The Barton Creek Greenbelt is a 7.25-mile (11.67 km) public green belt managed by the City of Austin's Park and Recreation Department. The Greenbelt, which begins at Zilker Park and stretches South/Southwest to the Woods of Westlake subdivision, is characterized by large limestone cliffs, dense foliage, and shallow bodies of water. Popular activities include rock climbing, mountain biking, and hiking. Some well known naturally forming swimming holes along Austin's greenbelt include Twin Falls, Sculpture Falls, Gus Fruh Pool, and Campbell's Hole. During years of heavy rainfall, the water level of the creek rises high enough to allow swimming, cliff diving, kayaking, paddle boarding, and tubing.

=== Swimming holes ===
Austin is home to more than 50 public pools and swimming holes. These include Deep Eddy Pool, Texas' oldest human-made swimming pool, and Barton Springs Pool, the nation's largest natural swimming pool in an urban area. Barton Springs Pool is spring-fed while Deep Eddy is well-fed. Both range in temperature from about 68.0 °F (20.0 °C) during the winter to about 71.6 °F (22.0 °C) during the summer. Hippie Hollow Park, a county park situated along Lake Travis, is the only officially sanctioned clothing-optional public park in Texas. Hamilton Pool Preserve is a natural pool that was created when the dome of an underground river collapsed due to massive erosion thousands of years ago. The pool, located about 23 miles (37 km) west of Austin, is a popular summer swimming spot for visitors and residents. Hamilton Pool Preserve consists of 232 acres (0.94 km^{2}) of protected natural habitat featuring a jade green pool into which a 50-foot (15 m) waterfall flows.

==== Other parks ====
In May 2021, voters in the City of Austin reinstated a public camping ban. That includes downtown green spaces as well as trails and greenbelts such as along Barton Creek. (Note: Although Council's attempt to address homelessness and the cost of living had prohibited camping in certain areas of the city, very lax enforcement of that policy frustrated the public and led to reinstatement of the widespread ban.)

McKinney Falls State Park is a state park administered by the Texas Parks and Wildlife Department, located at the confluence of Onion Creek and Williamson Creek. The park includes several designated hiking trails and campsites with water and electric. The namesake features of the park are the scenic upper and lower falls along Onion Creek. The Emma Long Metropolitan Park is a municipal park along the shores of Lake Austin, originally constructed by the Civilian Conservation Corps. The 284 acres (115 ha) Lady Bird Johnson Wildflower Center is a botanical garden and arboretum that features more than 800 species of native Texas plants in both garden and natural settings; the Wildflower Center is located 10 miles (16 km) southwest of Downtown in Circle C Ranch. Roy G. Guerrero Park is located along the Colorado River in East Riverside and contains miles of wooded trails, a sandy beach along the river, and a disc golf course.

Covert Park, located on the top of Mount Bonnell, is a popular tourist destination overlooking Lake Austin and the Colorado River. The mount provides a vista for viewing the city of Austin, Lake Austin, and the surrounding hills. It was designated a Recorded Texas Historic Landmark in 1969, bearing Marker number 6473, and was listed on the National Register of Historic Places in 2015.

The Louis René Barrera Indiangrass Wildlife Sanctuary, located on the north shore of Lake Walter E. Long, is a park managed by the Austin Parks and Recreation Department with the goal of restoring the Blackland Prairie. While not open to the public, it is accessible through guided tours.

== Demographics ==
Historical population
Census	Pop.	Note	%±
1850	629		—
1860	3,494		455.5%
1870	4,428		26.7%
1880	11,013		148.7%
1890	14,575		32.3%
1900	22,258		52.7%
1910	29,860		34.2%
1920	34,876		16.8%
1930	53,120		52.3%
1940	87,930		65.5%
1950	132,459		50.6%
1960	186,545		40.8%
1970	253,539		35.9%
1980	345,890		36.4%
1990	465,622		34.6%
2000	656,562		41.0%
2010	790,390		20.4%
2020	961,855		21.7%
2025 (est.)	1,002,632	▲	4.2%
U.S. Decennial Census; 2010–2020

In the 2020 census, Austin had a population of 961,855. The median age was 33.0 years. 19.4% of residents were under the age of 18 and 9.5% of residents were 65 years of age or older. For every 100 females there were 102.0 males, and for every 100 females age 18 and over there were 101.4 males age 18 and over.

99.5% of residents lived in urban areas, while 0.5% lived in rural areas.

There were 410,868 households in Austin, of which 24.9% had children under the age of 18 living in them. Of all households, 35.0% were married-couple households, 26.5% were households with a male householder and no spouse or partner present, and 29.0% were households with a female householder and no spouse or partner present. About 35.3% of all households were made up of individuals and 6.1% had someone living alone who was 65 years of age or older.

There were 444,426 housing units, of which 7.6% were vacant. Among occupied housing units, 41.2% were owner-occupied and 58.8% were renter-occupied. The homeowner vacancy rate was 1.2% and the rental vacancy rate was 7.8%.

The 2000 census found that the median household income was US$42,689. The median family income was $54,091. Males had a median income of $35,545 compared to $30,046 for females. The per capita income for the city was $24,163. About 9.1% of families and 14.4% of the population were below the poverty line, including 16.5% of those under age 18 and 8.7% of those age 65 or over. The median house price was $185,906 in 2009, and it has increased every year since 2004. The median value of a house which the owner occupies was $318,400 in 2019—higher than the average American home value of $240,500.

=== Racial and ethnic composition ===
Racial composition	2022	2020	2010	2000	1990	1970	1950
White (Non-Hispanic)	47.7%	47.1%	48.7%	56.4%	61.7%	73.4%	86.6%
Hispanic or Latino	32.5%	32.5%	35.1%	28.2%	23.0%	14.5%	n/a
Asian	8.4%	8.9%	6.2%	4.5%	3.0%	0.2%	0.1%
Black or African American	7.9%	6.9%	7.7%	9.3%	12.4%	11.8%	13.3%
Mixed	4.5%	3.9%	1.7%	2.9%			

A 2014 study found that Austin was the only U.S. city with a fast growth rate between 2000 and 2010, with a net loss in African Americans. In 2014, Austin's African American and non-Hispanic White percentage shares of the total population were declining despite the total populations of both ethnic groups increasing, as their rate of growth was slower than that of the city's Asian and Hispanic or Latino communities. Austin's non-Hispanic White population dropped below 50% in 2005.

In the 2010 United States census, the city of Austin had a population of 790,390. The racial and ethnic composition of Austin was 68.3% White (48.7% non-Hispanic White), 35.1% Hispanic or Latino (29.1% Mexican, 0.5% Puerto Rican, 0.4% Cuban, 5.1% Other), 8.1% African American, 6.3% Asian (1.9% Indian, 1.5% Chinese, 1.0% Vietnamese, 0.7% Korean, 0.3% Filipino, 0.2% Japanese, 0.8% Other), 0.9% American Indian, 0.1% Native Hawaiian and Other Pacific Islander, and 3.4% of two or more races. By 2020, its racial and ethnic composition was 47.1% non-Hispanic white, 32.5% Hispanic or Latino, 8.9% Asian, 6.9% Black or African American, and 3.9% multiracial.

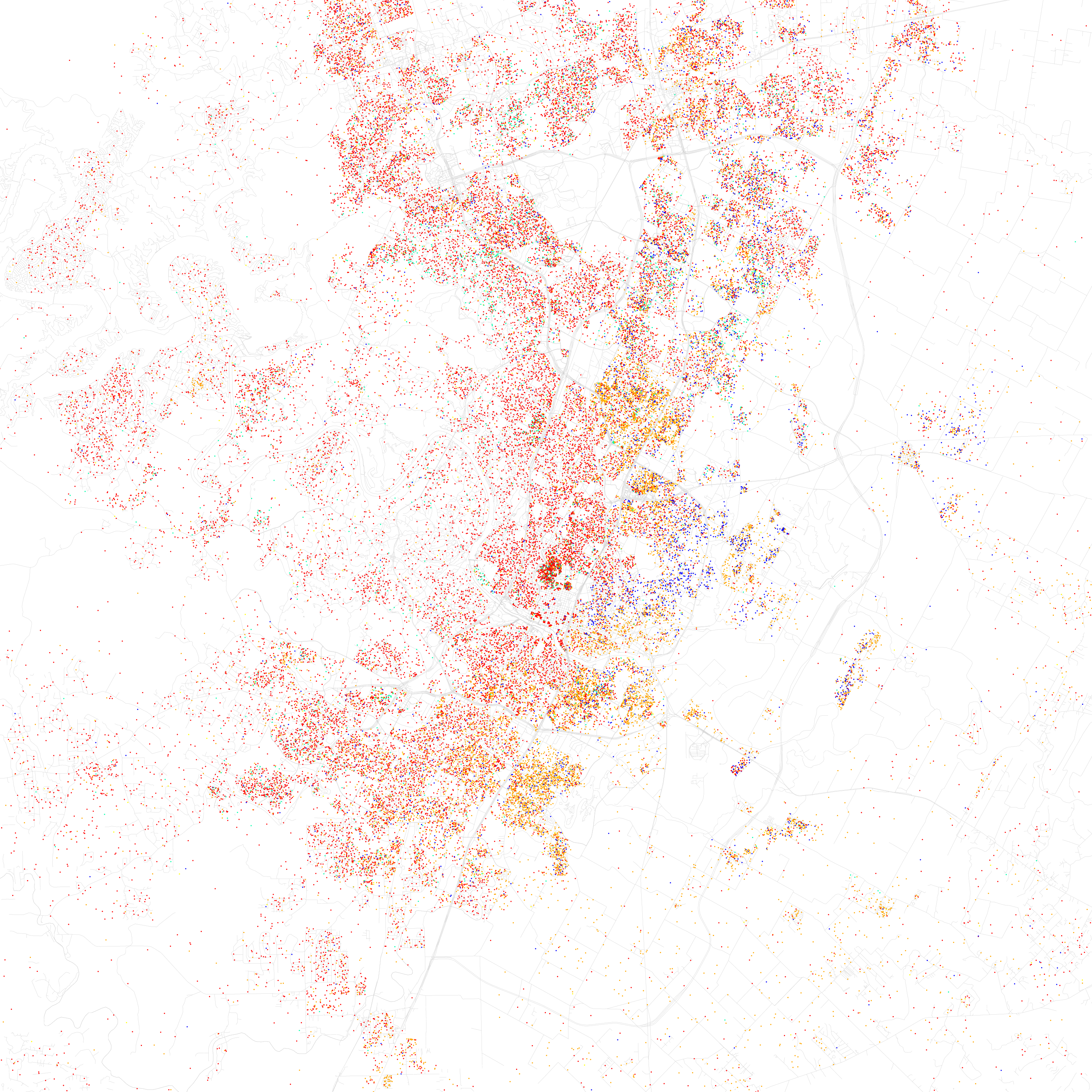
A racial distribution map of Austin, 2010 U.S. census. Each dot is 25 people: ⬤ White ⬤ Black ⬤ Asian ⬤ Hispanic ⬤ Other

=== Sexual orientation and gender identity ===
In 2014, 5.3% of residents in the Austin metropolitan area identified as lesbian, gay, bisexual, or transgender. The Austin metropolitan area had the third-highest rate in the nation.

=== Religion ===
In 2018, 52.4% of Austin's population identified as religious. The majority of Austinites identified themselves as Christians; about 25.2% of the population claimed affiliation with the Catholic Church. The city's Catholic population is served by the Roman Catholic Diocese of Austin, headquartered at the Cathedral of Saint Mary. Nationwide, 23% of Americans identified as Catholic in 2016.

Other significant Christian groups in Austin include Baptists (8.7%), followed by Methodists (4.3%), Latter-day Saints (1.5%), Episcopalians or Anglicans (1.0%), Lutherans (0.8%), Presbyterians (0.6%), Pentecostals (0.3%), and other Christians such as the Disciples of Christ and Eastern Orthodox Church (7.1%).

In 2018, 1.7% of Austin's population were Muslims, when 0.8% of Americans nationwide claimed affiliation with the Islamic faith. The dominant branch of Islam is Sunni Islam. Established in 1977, the largest mosque in Austin is the Islamic Center of Greater Austin. The community is affiliated with the Islamic Society of North America. In 2018, Judaism formed less than 0.1% of the religious demographic in Austin. Orthodox, Reform, and Conservative congregations are present in the community.

Eastern faiths including Buddhism and Hinduism made up 0.9% of Austin's religious population. Several Hindu temples exist in the Austin Metropolitan area with the most notable one being Radha Madhav Dham. Austin is also home to an active secular humanist community, hosting nationwide television shows and charity work.

=== Homelessness ===
In 2019, there were 2,255 individuals experiencing homelessness in Travis County. Of those, 1,169 were sheltered and 1,086 were unsheltered. In September 2019, the Austin City Council approved $62.7 million for programs aimed at homelessness, which includes housing displacement prevention, crisis mitigation, and affordable housing. The city council also earmarked $500,000 for crisis services and encampment cleanups.

In June 2019, following Martin v. Boise, a federal court ruling on homelessness sleeping in public, the Austin City Council lifted a 25-year-old ban on camping, sitting, or lying down in public unless doing so causes an obstruction. The resolution also included the approval of a new housing-focused shelter in South Austin. In early October 2019, Texas Governor Greg Abbott sent a letter to Mayor Steve Adler threatening to deploy state resources to combat the camping ban repeal. On October 17, 2019, the City Council revised the camping ordinance, which imposed increased restrictions on sidewalk camping. In November 2019, the State of Texas opened a temporary homeless encampment on a former vehicle storage yard owned by the Texas Department of Transportation.

In May 2021, the camping ban was reinstated after a ballot proposition was approved by 57% of voters. The ban introduces penalties for camping, sitting, or lying down on a public sidewalk or sleeping outdoors in or near Downtown Austin or the area around the University of Texas campus. The ordinance also prohibits solicitation at certain locations.

== Economy ==
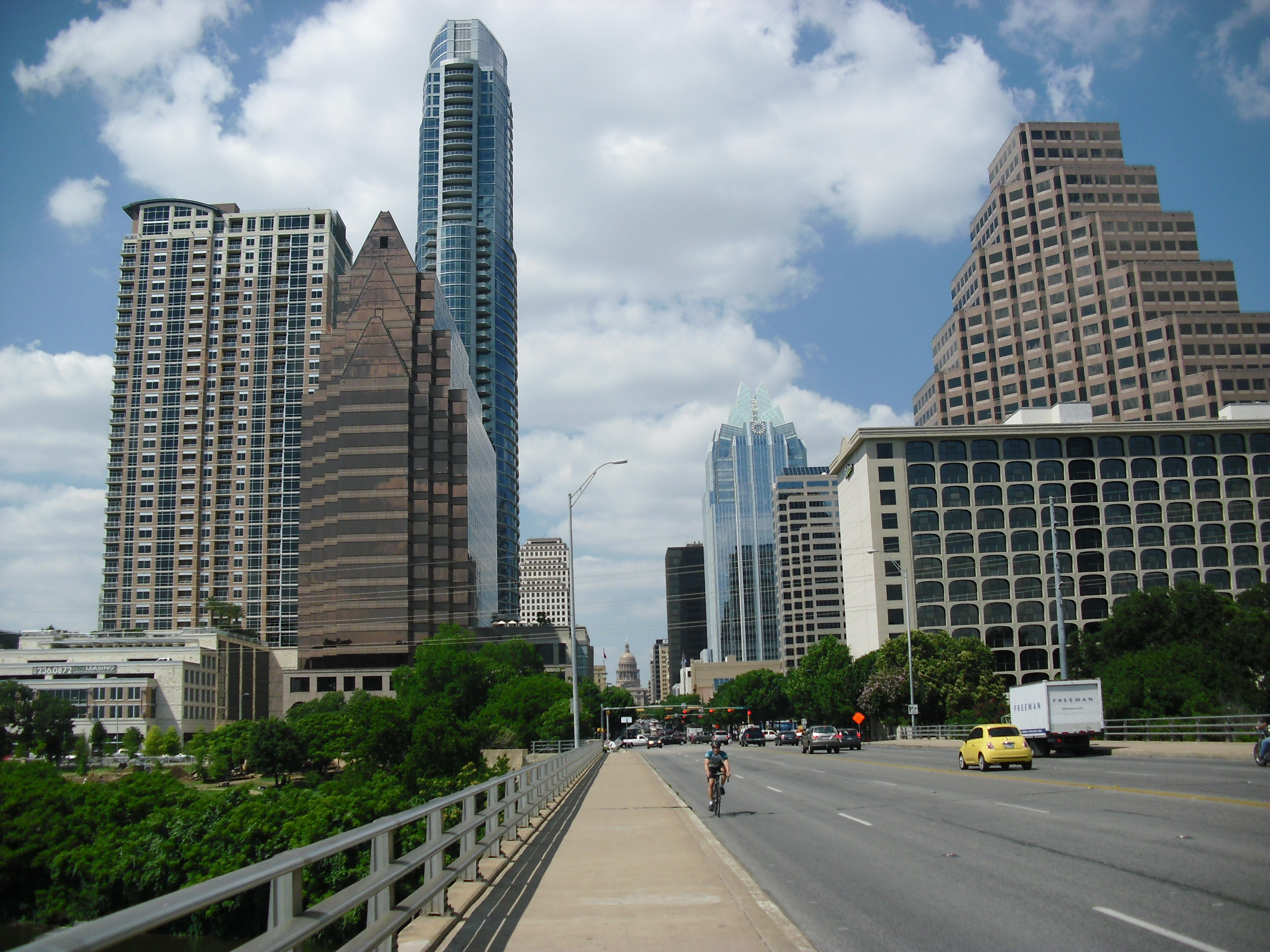
Downtown Austin from Congress Avenue Bridge, with Texas State Capitol in background, 2012

The Greater Austin metropolitan statistical area had a gross domestic product (GDP) of $248 billion in 2023. Austin is considered to be a major center for high tech. Thousands of graduates each year from the engineering and computer science programs at the University of Texas at Austin provide a steady source of employees that help to fuel Austin's technology and defense industry sectors. As a result of the high concentration of high-tech companies in the region, Austin was strongly affected by the dot-com boom in the late 1990s and subsequent bust. Austin's largest employers include the Austin Independent School District, the City of Austin, Dell Technologies, the U.S. Federal Government, NXP Semiconductors, IBM, St. David's Healthcare Partnership, Seton Family of Hospitals, the State of Texas, the Texas State University, and the University of Texas at Austin.

Other high-tech companies with operations in Austin include 3M, Apple (the largest campus outside of Cupertino), Amazon, AMD, Apartment Ratings, Applied Materials, Arm, Bigcommerce, BioWare, Blizzard Entertainment, Buffalo Technology, Cirrus Logic, Cisco Systems, Cloudflare, CrowdStrike, Dropbox, eBay, Electronic Arts, Flextronics, Facebook, Google, Hewlett-Packard, Hoover's, HomeAway, HostGator, Indeed, Intel Corporation, Meta, National Instruments, Nintendo, Nvidia, Oracle, PayPal, Polycom, Qualcomm, Rackspace, RetailMeNot, Rooster Teeth, Samsung Group, Silicon Labs, Spansion, TikTok, United Devices, VMware, X (formerly Twitter), Xerox, and Zoho Corporation. The proliferation of technology companies has led to the region's nickname, "Silicon Hills", and spurred development that greatly expanded the city.

Tesla, Inc., an electric vehicle and electric power company has its corporate headquarters in Austin inside Gigafactory Texas, a large vehicle assembly plant which employs over 20,000 people. The company expects to eventually have a staff of 60,000 in the Austin area as production ramps up.

Austin is also emerging as a hub for pharmaceutical and biotechnology companies; the city is home to about 85 of them. In 2004, the city was ranked by the Milken Institute as the No. 12 biotech and life science center in the United States and in 2018, CBRE Group ranked Austin as #3 emerging life sciences cluster. Companies such as Hospira, Pharmaceutical Product Development, and ArthroCare Corporation are located there.

Whole Foods Market, an international grocery store chain specializing in fresh and packaged food products, was founded and is headquartered in Austin.

Other companies based in Austin include NXP Semiconductors, GoodPop, Temple-Inland, Sweet Leaf Tea Company, Keller Williams Realty, National Western Life, GSD&M, Dimensional Fund Advisors, Golfsmith, Forestar Group, EZCorp, Outdoor Voices, Tito's Vodka, Speak Social, and YETI.

In 2018, Austin metro-area companies saw a total of $1.33 billion invested. In 2018, Austin's venture capital investments accounted for more than 60 percent of Texas' total investments.

=== Employment ===
As of 2024, the unemployment rate in Austin was 3.4% and the median household income was $83,830; Austin's top employers were:

Rank	Employer	Employees in 2024	Employees in 2015	2024 Share	2015 Share
1	State Government	▲40,460	38,499	▼2.97%	4.06%
2	University of Texas at Austin	▲32,193	23,131	▼2.37%	2.44%
3	H-E-B	▲22,955	11,277	▲1.69%	1.19%
4	City of Austin	▲16,195	12,977	▼1.19%	1.37%
5	Ascension Seton a.k.a. Seton Healthcare Network	▲14,842	10,945	▼1.09%	1.15%
6	Federal Government	▲14,700	11,800	▼1.08%	1.24%
7	Dell	13,000	13,000	▼0.96%	1.37%
8	Tesla	▲12,277	-	▲0.90%	-
9	St. David's Healthcare Partnership	▲11,484	8,369	▼0.84%	0.88%
10	Amazon	▲11,000	-	▲0.81%	-

== Infrastructure ==
=== Transportation ===
In 2009, 72.7% of Austin (city) commuters drove alone, with other mode shares being: 10.4% carpool, 6% were remote workers, 5% use transit, 2.3% walk, and 1% bicycle. In 2016, the American Community Survey estimated modal shares for Austin (city) commuters of 73.5% for driving alone, 9.6% for carpooling, 3.6% for riding transit, 2% for walking, and 1.5% for cycling. The city of Austin has a lower than average percentage of households without a car. In 2015, 6.9 percent of Austin households lacked a car, and decreased slightly to 6 percent in 2016. The national average was 8.7 percent in 2016. Austin averaged 1.65 cars per household in 2016, compared to a national average of 1.8.

==== Highways ====
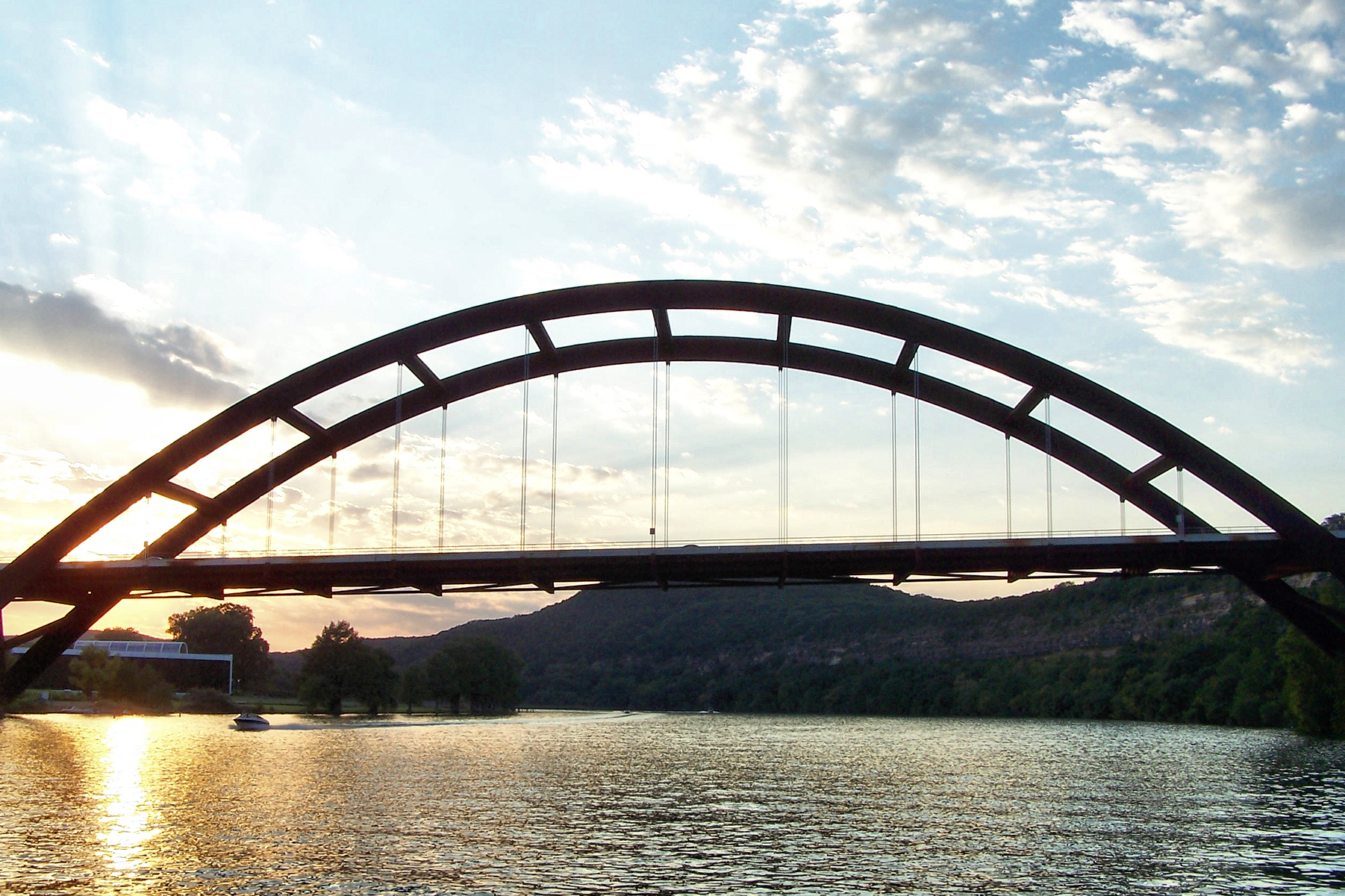
The Pennybacker Bridge is the signature element of Loop 360 in the Texas Hill Country.

Central Austin lies between two major north–south freeways: I-35 to the east and the Mopac Expressway (Loop 1) to the west. US 183 runs from northwest to southeast, and SH 71 crosses the southern part of the city from east to west, completing a rough "box" around central and north-central Austin. Austin is the largest city in the United States to be served by only one Interstate Highway.

US 290 enters Austin from the east and merges into I-35. Its highway designation continues south on I-35 and then becomes part of SH 71, continuing to the west. US 290 splits from Highway 71 in southwest Austin, in an interchange known as "The Y". SH 71 continues to Brady, and Highway 290 continues west to interchange for I-10 near Junction. I-35 continues south through San Antonio to Laredo on the Mexican border. I-35 is the highway link to the Dallas-Fort Worth metroplex in Northern Texas. There are two links to Houston (US 290 and SH 71/I-10). US 183 leads northwest of Austin toward Lampasas.

In the mid-1980s, construction was completed on Loop 360, a scenic highway that curves through the hill country from near the 71/Mopac interchange in the south to near the US 183/Mopac interchange in the north. The iconic Pennybacker Bridge, also known as the "360 Bridge," crosses Lake Austin to connect the northern and southern portions of Loop 360.

==== Tollways ====
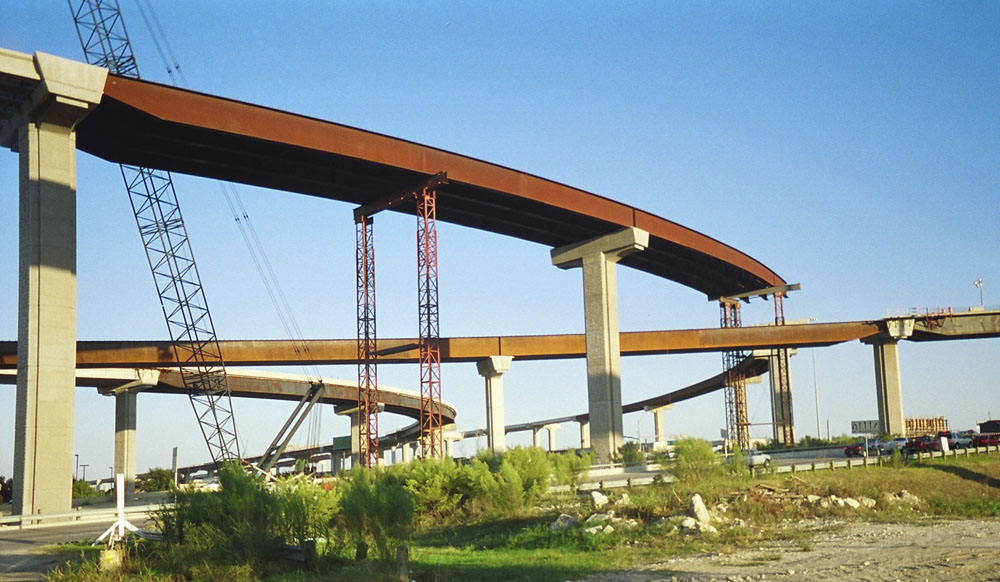
Interchange of Interstate 35 and State Highway 45

SH 130 is a bypass route designed to relieve traffic congestion, starting from I-35 just north of Georgetown and running along a parallel route to the east, where it bypasses Round Rock, Austin, San Marcos and New Braunfels before ending at I-10 east of Seguin, where drivers could drive 30 miles (48 km) west to return to I-35 in San Antonio. The first segment was opened in November 2006, which was located east of Austin–Bergstrom International Airport at Austin's southeast corner on SH 71. Highway 130 runs concurrently with SH 45 from Pflugerville on the north until it reaches US 183 well south of Austin, at which point SR 45 continues west. The entire route of SH 130 is now complete. The final leg opened on November 1, 2012. The highway is noted for having a maximum speed limit of 85 mph (137 km/h) for the entire route. The 41-mile (66 km) section of the toll road between Mustang Ridge and Seguin has a posted speed limit of 85 mph (137 km/h), the highest posted speed limit in the United States.

SH 45 runs east–west from just south of US 183 in Cedar Park to 130 inside Pflugerville (just east of Round Rock). A tolled extension of State Highway Loop 1 was also created. A new southeast leg of SH 45 has recently been completed, running from US 183 and the south end of Segment 5 of TX-130 south of Austin due west to I-35 at the FM 1327/Creedmoor Road exit between the south end of Austin and Buda. The 183A Toll Road opened in March 2007, providing a tolled alternative to US 183 through the cities of Leander and Cedar Park. Currently under construction is a change to East US 290 from US 183 to the town of Manor. Officially, the tollway will be dubbed Tollway 290 with "Manor Expressway" as nickname.

Despite the overwhelming initial opposition to the toll road concept when it was first announced, all three toll roads have exceeded revenue projections.

==== Airports ====
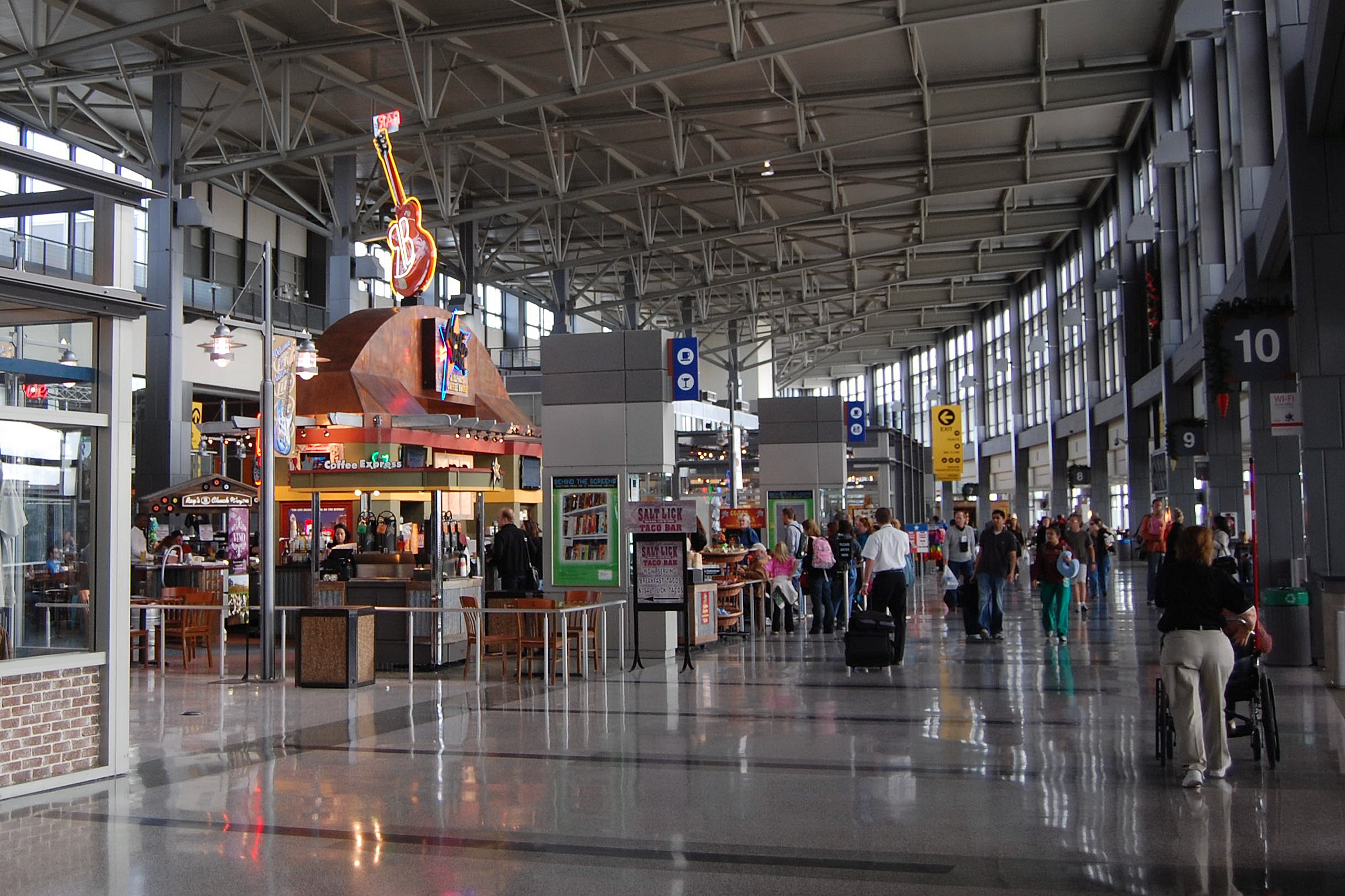
The Barbara Jordan Terminal at Austin–Bergstrom International Airport

Austin's primary airport is Austin–Bergstrom International Airport (ABIA) (IATA code AUS), located 5 miles (8 km) southeast of the city. The airport is on the site of the former Bergstrom Air Force Base, which was closed in 1993 as part of the Base Realignment and Closure process. Until 1999, Robert Mueller Municipal Airport was Austin's main airport until ABIA took that role and the old airport was shut down. Austin Executive Airport, along with several smaller airports outside the city center, serves general aviation traffic.

==== Intercity transit ====
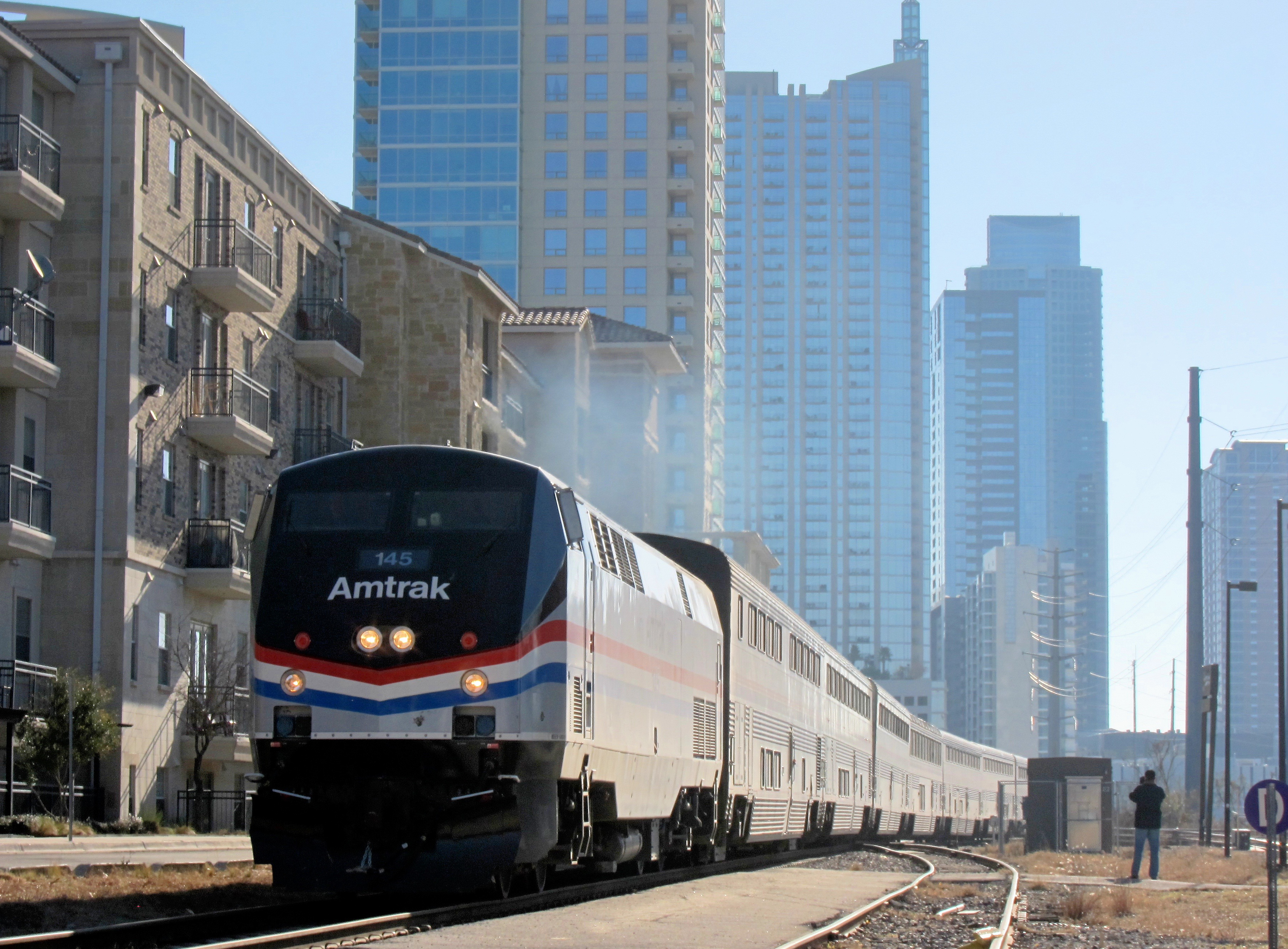
Amtrak's Texas Eagle stops in Austin twice daily.

Amtrak's Austin Station is located in west downtown and is served by the Texas Eagle which runs daily between Chicago and San Antonio, continuing on to Los Angeles several times a week.

Railway segments between Austin and San Antonio have been evaluated for a proposed regional passenger rail project called "Lone Star Rail". However, failure to come to an agreement with the track's current owner, Union Pacific Railroad, ended the project in 2016.

Greyhound Lines operates the current Austin Bus Station at the Eastside Bus Plaza Grupo Senda's Turimex Internacional service operates bus service from Austin to Nuevo Laredo and on to many destinations in Mexico from their station in East Austin. Megabus offers daily service to San Antonio, Dallas/Fort Worth and Houston.

==== Public transportation ====
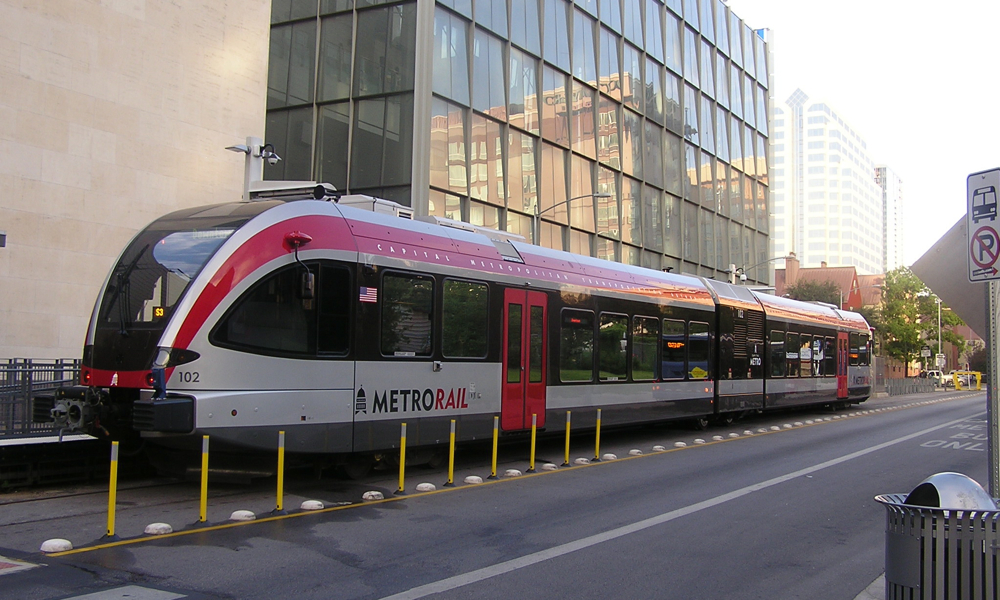
CapMetro Rail train at Downtown station

The Capital Metropolitan Transportation Authority (CapMetro) provides public transportation to the city, primarily with its CapMetro Bus local bus service, the CapMetro Express express bus system, as well as a bus rapid transit service, CapMetro Rapid. CapMetro opened a 32-mile (51 km) hybrid rail system, CapMetro Rail, in 2010. The system consists of a single line serving downtown Austin, the neighborhoods of East Austin, North Central Austin, and Northwest Austin plus the suburb of Leander.

Since it began operations in 1985, CapMetro has proposed adding light rail services to its network. Despite support from the City Council, voters rejected light rail proposals in 2000 and 2014. However, in 2020, voters approved CapMetro's US$10 billion transit expansion plan, Project Connect, by a comfortable margin. The plan proposes 2 new light rail lines, an additional bus rapid transit line (which could be converted to light rail in the future), a second commuter rail line, several new MetroRapid lines, more MetroExpress routes, and a number of other infrastructure, technology and service expansion projects.

Capital Area Rural Transportation System connects Austin with outlying suburbs and surrounding rural areas.

==== Ride sharing ====
Austin is served by several ride-sharing companies including Uber and Lyft. On May 9, 2016, Uber and Lyft voluntarily ceased operations in Austin in response to a city ordinance that required ride sharing company drivers to get fingerprint checks, have their vehicles labeled, and not pick up or drop off in certain city lanes. Uber and Lyft resumed service on May 29, 2017, after Governor Greg Abbott signed House Bill 100, which established statewide regulation of ride-hailing companies and overrode local requirements. The city was previously served by Fasten until they ceased all operations in the city in March 2018.

Waymo began offering driverless rides in Austin through the Uber app in March 2025. Texas law preempts municipal regulation of autonomous-vehicle operations. Beginning May 28, 2026, commercial driverless-vehicle operators were required to maintain authorization from the Texas Department of Motor Vehicles, while state and local law enforcement retained responsibility for enforcing traffic laws.

Austin is also served by Electric Cab of North America's six-passenger electric cabs that operate on a flexible route from the Kramer MetroRail Station to Domain Northside and from the Downtown CapMetro Rail station and MetroRapid stops to locations between the Austin Convention Center and near Sixth and Bowie streets by Whole Foods.

Carsharing service Zipcar operates in Austin and, until 2019, the city was also served by Car2Go which kept its North American headquarters in the city even after pulling out.

==== Cycling and walking ====
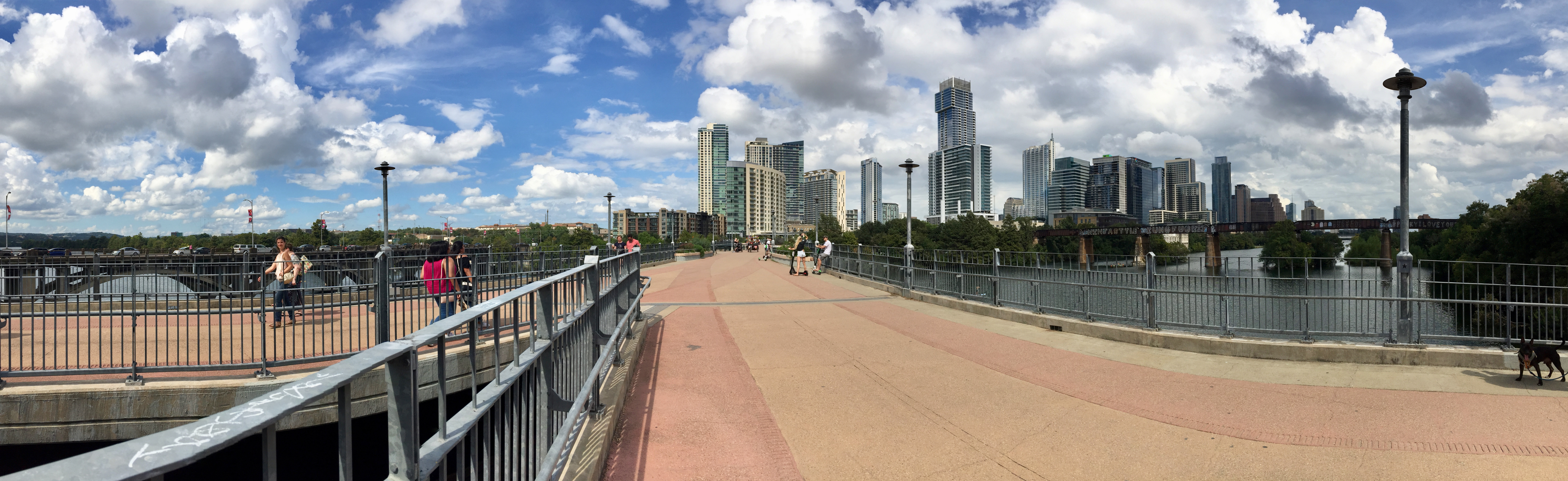
The Pfluger Pedestrian Bridge over the Colorado River

The city's bike advocacy organization is Bike Austin. BikeTexas, a state-level advocacy organization, also has its main office in Austin.

Bicycles are a popular transportation choice among students, faculty, and staff at the University of Texas. According to a survey done at the University of Texas, 57% of commuters bike to campus.

The City of Austin and CapMetro jointly operate CapMetro Bikeshare, a public bike-sharing system of electric-assist bikes in central Austin that connects riders to transit stations. CapMetro Bikeshare was formerly known as MetroBike and, before that, Austin BCycle. In 2018, Lime began offering dockless bikes, which do not need to be docked at a designated station.

In 2018, scooter-sharing companies Lime and Bird debuted rentable electric scooters in Austin. The city briefly banned the scooters — which began operations before the city could implement a permitting system — until the city completed development of their "dockless mobility" permitting process on May 1, 2018. Dockless electric scooters and bikes are banned from Austin city parks and the Ann and Roy Butler Trail and Boardwalk. For the 2018 Austin City Limits Music Festival, the city of Austin offered a designated parking area for dockless bikes and scooters.

==== Parking lots ====
In November 2023, Austin became the largest city in the US that has abolished parking mandates. It did so to encourage walking, biking, and public transit use, as well as to lower the cost of housing and increase the amount of housing units that can be built in the city. Portland and Minneapolis also took this action.

== Culture ==
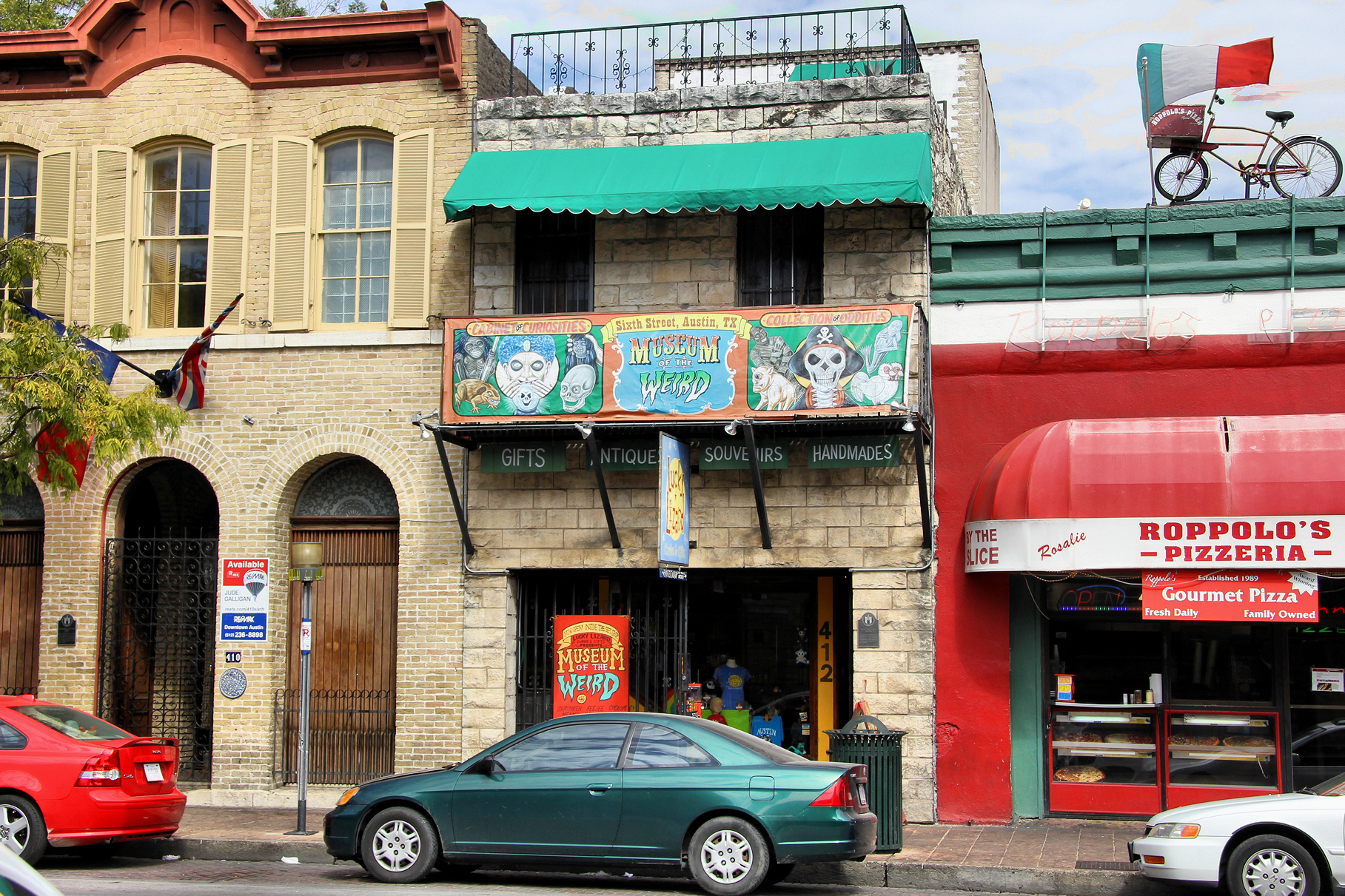
The Museum of the Weird on Sixth Street

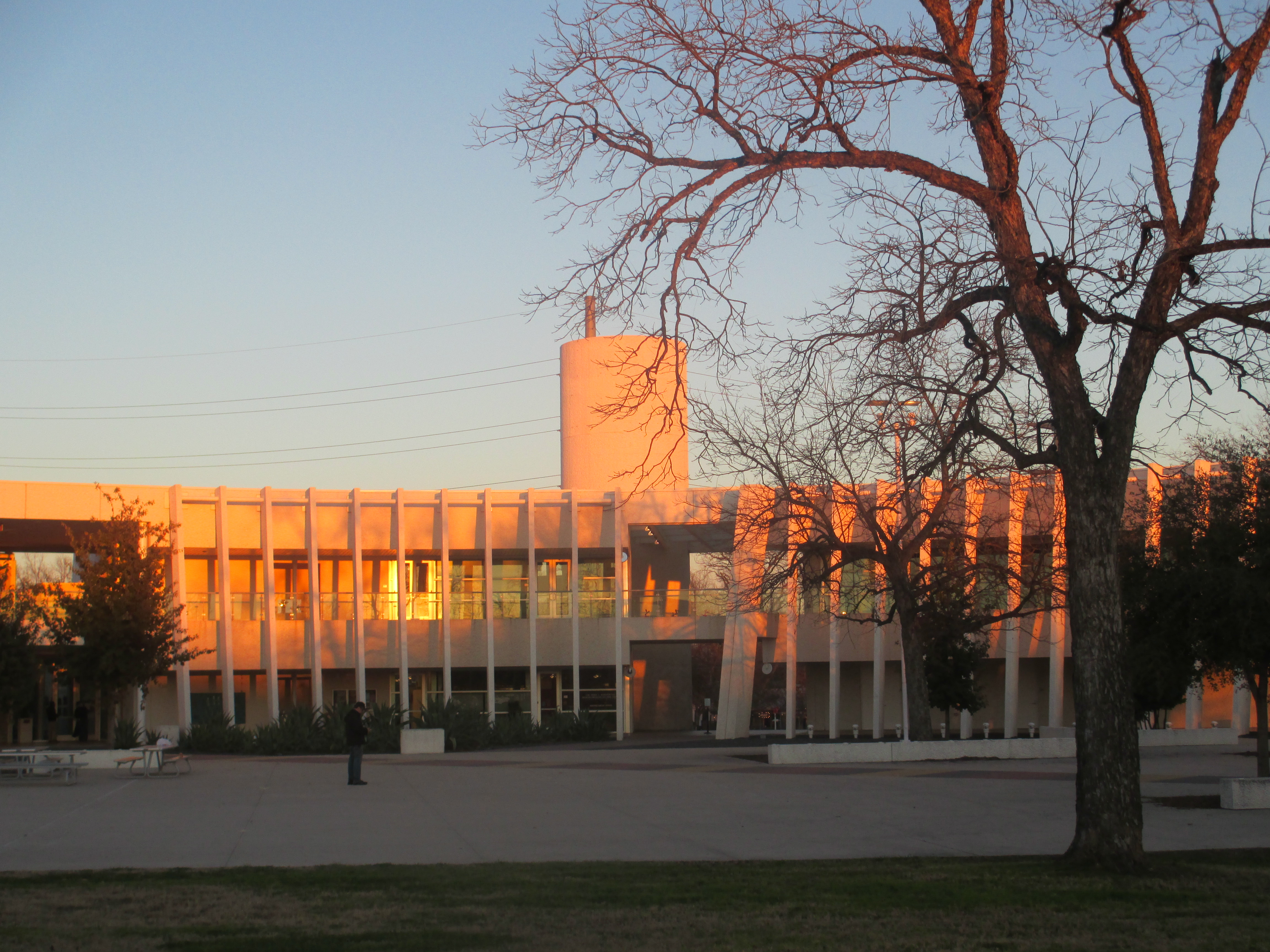
The Emma S. Barrientos Mexican American Cultural Center, located on Lady Bird Lake at 600 River Street

"Keep Austin Weird" has been a local motto for years, featured on bumper stickers and T-shirts. This motto has not only been used in promoting Austin's eccentricity and diversity, but is also meant to bolster support of local independent businesses. According to the 2010 book Weird City the phrase was begun by a local Austin Community College librarian, Red Wassenich, and his wife, Karen Pavelka, who were concerned about Austin's "rapid descent into commercialism and overdevelopment". The slogan has been interpreted many ways since its inception, but remains an important symbol for many Austinites who wish to voice concerns over rapid growth and development. Austin has a long history of vocal citizen resistance to development projects perceived to degrade the environment, or to threaten the natural and cultural landscapes.

According to the Nielsen Company, adults in Austin read and contribute to blogs more than those in any other U.S. metropolitan area and have the highest Internet usage in all of Texas. In 2013, Austin was the most active city on Reddit, having the largest number of views per capita.

South Congress is a shopping district stretching down South Congress Avenue from Downtown. This area is home to coffee shops, eccentric stores, restaurants, food trucks, trailers, and festivals. It prides itself on "Keeping Austin Weird," especially with development in the surrounding area(s). Many Austinites attribute its enduring popularity to the unobstructed view of the Texas State Capitol.

The Rainey Street Historic District is a neighborhood in Downtown Austin formerly consisting of bungalow style homes built in the early 20th century. Since the early 2010s, the former working class residential street has turned into a popular nightlife district. Much of the historic homes have been renovated into hotels, condominiums, bars and restaurants, many of which feature large porches and outdoor yards for patrons. The Rainey Street district is also home to the Emma S. Barrientos Mexican American Cultural Center.

Austin has been part of the UNESCO Creative Cities Network under the category Media Arts.

=== Old Austin ===
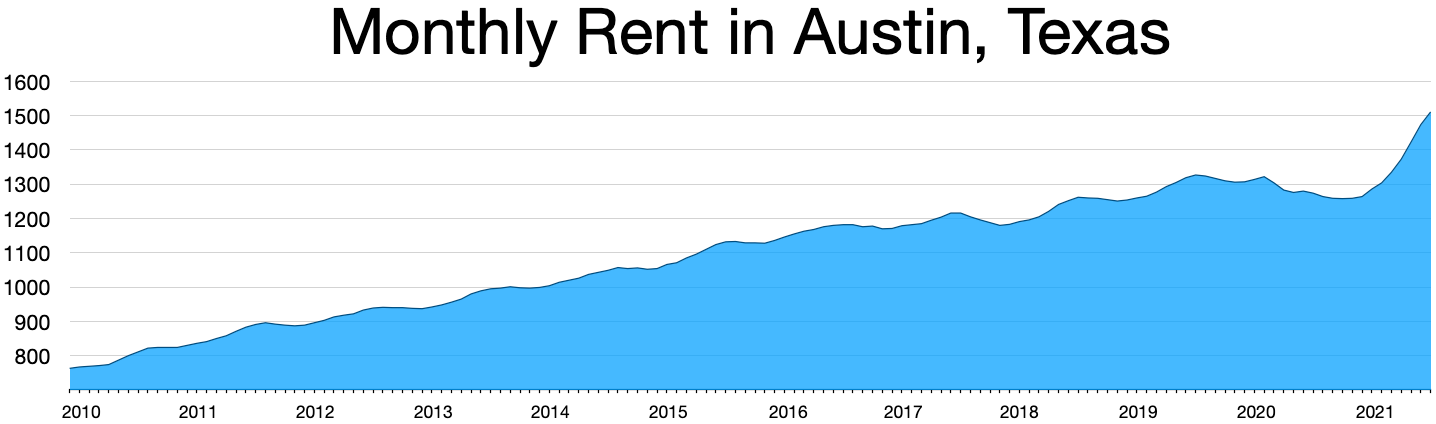
Austin, Texas average monthly rent, 2010 to 2022

"Old Austin" is an adage often used by nostalgic natives. The term "Old Austin" refers to a time when the city was smaller and more bohemian with a considerably lower cost of living and better known for its lack of traffic, hipsters, and urban sprawl. It is often employed by longtime residents expressing displeasure at the rapidly changing culture, or when referencing nostalgia of Austin culture.

The growth and popularity of Austin can be seen by the expansive development taking place in its downtown landscape. This growth can have a negative impact on longtime small businesses that cannot keep up with the expenses associated with gentrification and the rising cost of real estate. A former Austin musician, Dale Watson, described his move away from Austin, "I just really feel the city has sold itself. Just because you're going to get $45 million for a company to come to town – if it's not in the best interest of the town, I don't think they should do it. This city was never about money. It was about quality of life."

Though much is changing rapidly in Austin, businesses such as Thundercloud Subs are thought by many to maintain classic Austin business cultural sentiments unique to the history of the city; as Diana Burgess stated, "I definitely appreciate that they haven't raised their prices a ton or made things super fancy. I think it speaks to that original Old Austin vibe. A lot of us that grew up here really appreciate that." Aaron Franklin, owner of Franklin Barbecue, credited the Old Austin cultural mindset and community support with the success of his barbecue restaurant and the long lines that have supported his business since starting it out of a food trailer in 2009.

=== Annual cultural events ===
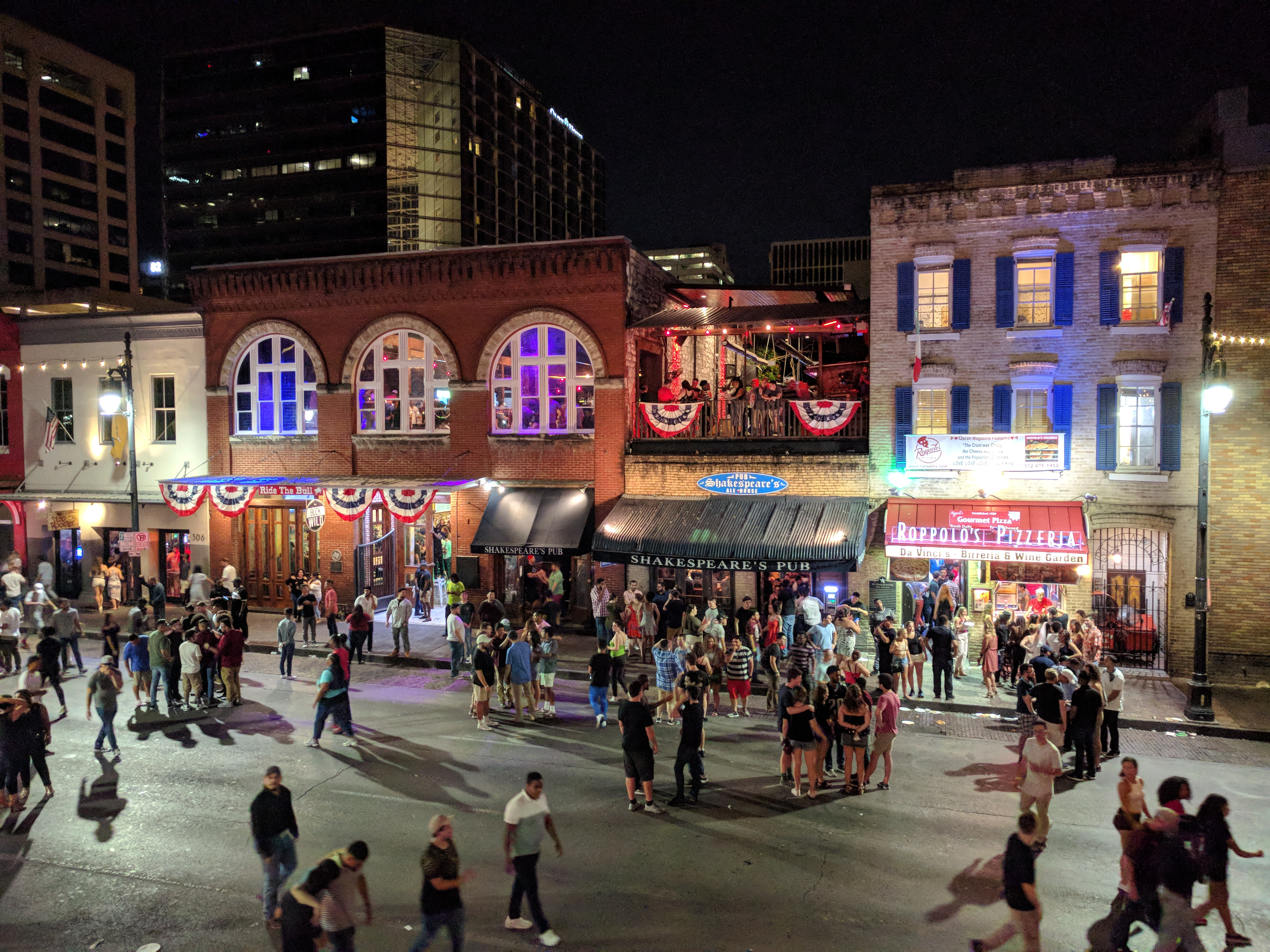
Sixth Street on a weekend night

The O. Henry House Museum hosts the annual O. Henry Pun-Off, a pun contest where the successful contestants exhibit wit akin to that of the author William Sydney Porter.

Other annual events include Eeyore's Birthday Party, Spamarama, Austin Pride Festival & Parade in August, the Austin Reggae Festival in April, Kite Festival, Texas Craft Brewers Festival in September, Art City Austin in April, East Austin Studio Tour in November, and Carnaval Brasileiro in February. Sixth Street features annual festivals such as the Pecan Street Festival and Halloween night. The three-day Austin City Limits Music Festival has been held in Zilker Park every year since 2002. Every year around the end of March and the beginning of April, Austin is home to "Texas Relay Weekend".

Austin's Zilker Park Tree is a Christmas display made of lights strung from the top of a Moonlight tower in Zilker Park. The Zilker Tree is lit in December along with the "Trail of Lights," an Austin Christmas tradition. The Trail of Lights was canceled four times, first starting in 2001 and 2002 due to the September 11 Attacks, and again in 2010 and 2011 due to budget shortfalls, but the trail was turned back on for the 2012 holiday season.

From 1962 to 1998, the Austin Aqua Festival, or "Aqua Fest", took place on the shores of Town Lake (now known as Lady Bird Lake). Originally conceived as a summer tourism draw, the multi-day event evolved from water-themed activities to a broader civic festival due to growth and community interest. Eventually attendance and financial solvency began to dwindle as larger music and summer festivals grew in prominence.

=== Cuisine and breweries ===
A food truck trailer park in South Austin

Notable Austin cuisine includes Texas barbecue and Tex-Mex; Franklin Barbecue in Austin's has sold out of brisket every day since its establishment. Breakfast tacos and queso are popular food items in the city; Austin is sometimes called the "home of the breakfast taco". Kolaches are a common pastry in Austin bakeries due to the large Czech and German immigrant population in Texas. The Oasis Restaurant is the largest outdoor restaurant in Texas, which promotes itself as the "Sunset Capital of Texas" with its terraced views looking West over Lake Travis. Birdie's, a counter-service restaurant and wine bar that opened in 2021, was Food & Wine's 2023 Restaurant of the Year.

P. Terry's, an Austin-based fast food burger chain, has a loyal following among Austinites. Some other Austin-based chain restaurants include Amy's Ice Creams, Chuy's, DoubleDave's Pizzaworks, and Schlotzky's. The Chili's at 45th and Lamar has been the subject of internet memes since 2011.

Austin is also home to a large number of food trucks, with 1,256 food trucks operating in 2016. The city of Austin has the second-largest number of food trucks per capita in the United States. Austin's first food hall, "Fareground," features a number of Austin-based food vendors and a bar in the ground level and courtyard of One Congress Plaza.

Austin has a large craft beer scene, with over 50 microbreweries in the metro area. Notable Austin-area breweries include Jester King Brewery, Live Oak Brewing Company, and Real Ale Brewing Company.

=== Music ===
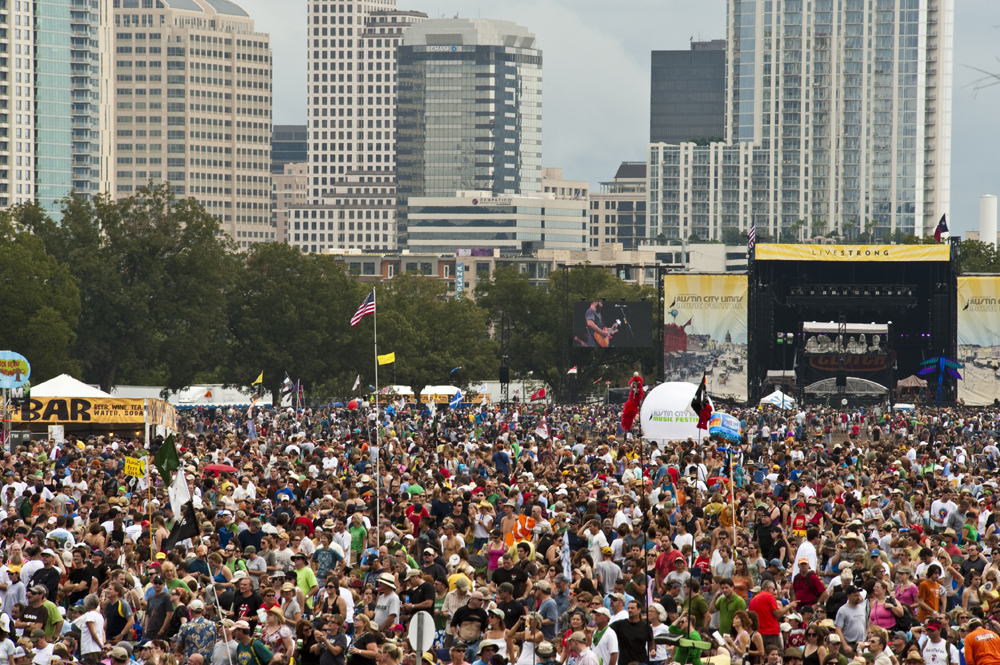
The 2009 Austin City Limits Music Festival with view of stages and Downtown Austin

The official slogan of Austin is "The Live Music Capital of the World", and the city has a vibrant live music scene with more music venues per capita than any other U.S. city. Austin's music revolves around the many nightclubs on 6th Street and an annual music/film/interactive festival known as South by Southwest (SXSW). The concentration of restaurants, bars, and music venues in the city's downtown core is a major contributor to Austin's live music scene, as the ZIP Code encompassing the downtown entertainment district hosts the most bar or alcohol-serving establishments in the U.S.

The longest-running concert music program on American television, Austin City Limits, is recorded at ACL Live at The Moody Theater, located in the bottom floor of the 478 feet (146 m) W Hotels in Austin. Austin City Limits and C3 Presents produce the Austin City Limits Music Festival, an annual music and art festival held at Zilker Park in Austin. Other music events include the Urban Music Festival, Fun Fun Fun Fest, Wobeon Music Festival, Chaos In Tejas, Seismic Music Festival at the Concourse Project, and Old Settler's Music Festival. Austin Lyric Opera performs multiple operas each year, including the 2007 opening of Philip Glass's Waiting for the Barbarians, written by University of Texas at Austin alumnus J. M. Coetzee.

The Austin Symphony Orchestra performs a range of classical, pop and family performances and is led by music director and conductor Peter Bay. The Austin Baroque Orchestra and La Follia Austin Baroque ensembles both give historically informed performances of Baroque music. The Texas Early Music Project regularly performs music from the Medieval and Renaissance eras, as well as the Baroque.

=== Film ===
Austin hosts several film festivals, including the SXSW (South by Southwest) Film Festival and the Austin Film Festival, which hosts international films. A movie theater chain by the name of Alamo Drafthouse Cinema was founded in Austin in 1997; the South Lamar location of which is home to the annual week-long Fantastic Fest film festival. In 2004 the city was first in MovieMaker Magazine's annual top ten cities to live and make movies.

Austin has been the location for a number of motion pictures, partly due to the influence of The University of Texas at Austin Department of Radio-Television-Film. Films produced in Austin include The Texas Chain Saw Massacre (1974), Songwriter (1984), Man of the House, Secondhand Lions, Texas Chainsaw Massacre 2, Nadine, Waking Life, Spy Kids, The Faculty, Dazed and Confused, The Guards Themselves, Wild Texas Wind, Office Space, The Life of David Gale, Miss Congeniality, Doubting Thomas, Slacker, Idiocracy, Death Proof, The New Guy, Hope Floats, The Alamo, Blank Check, The Wendall Baker Story, School of Rock, A Slipping-Down Life, A Scanner Darkly, Saturday Morning Massacre, and most recently, the Coen brothers' True Grit, Grindhouse, Machete, How to Eat Fried Worms, Bandslam and Lazer Team. In order to draw future film projects to the area, the Austin Film Society has converted several airplane hangars from the former Mueller Airport into filmmaking center Austin Studios. Projects that have used facilities at Austin Studios include music videos by The Flaming Lips and feature films such as 25th Hour and Sin City.

Austin also hosted the MTV series, The Real World: Austin in 2005. Season 4 of the AMC show Fear the Walking Dead was filmed in various locations around Austin in 2018. The film review websites Spill.com and Ain't It Cool News are based in Austin. Rooster Teeth Productions, creator of popular web series such as Red vs. Blue, RWBY, and Camp Camp was also located in Austin.

=== Theater ===
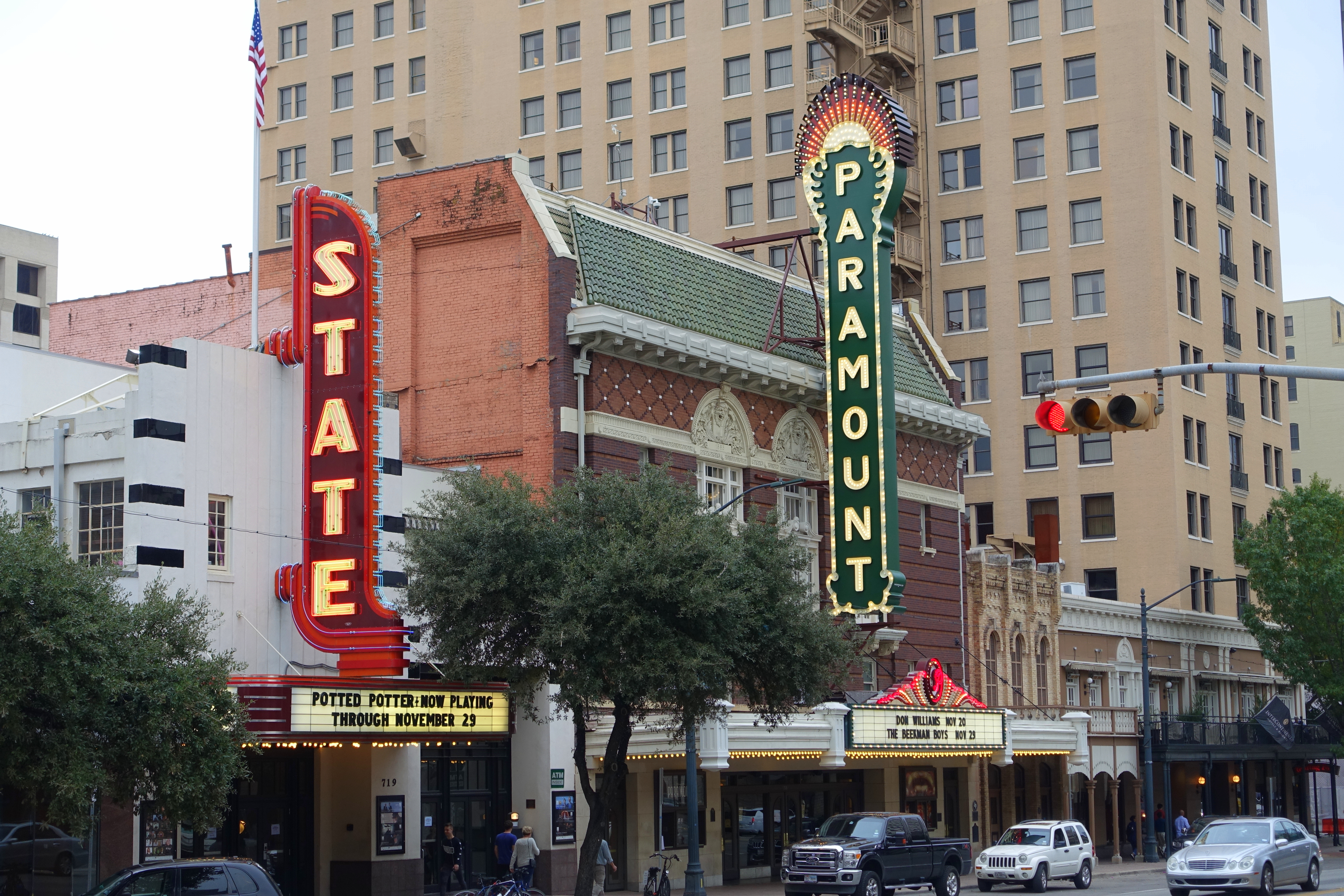
The State Theatre and Paramount Theatre on Congress Avenue in Downtown Austin

Austin has a strong theater culture, with dozens of itinerant and resident companies producing a variety of work. A volunteer-run arts organization supporting creative expression and counter-culture community - Church of the Friendly Ghost (COTFG) helped many experimental programs get their start in Austin, TX. The city also has live performance theater venues such as the Zachary Scott Theatre Center, Vortex Repertory Company, Salvage Vanguard Theater, Rude Mechanicals' the Off Center, Austin Playhouse, Scottish Rite Children's Theater, Hyde Park Theatre, the Blue Theater, The Hideout Theatre, and Esther's Follies. The Victory Grill was a renowned venue on the Chitlin' Circuit. Public art and performances in the parks and on bridges are popular. Austin hosts the Fuse Box Festival each April featuring theater artists.

The Paramount Theatre, opened in downtown Austin in 1915, contributes to Austin's theater and film culture, showing classic films throughout the summer and hosting regional premieres for films such as Miss Congeniality. The neighboring State Theatre, which opened in 1935, merged with the Paramount in 2000 to form the Austin Theatre Alliance, the nonprofit organization that operates both venues. The Zilker Park Summer Musical is a long-running outdoor musical.

The Long Center for the Performing Arts is a 2,300-seat theater built partly with materials reused from the old Lester E. Palmer Auditorium.

Ballet Austin is among the fifteen largest ballet academies in the country. Each year Ballet Austin's 20-member professional company performs ballets from a wide variety of choreographers, including their artistic director, Stephen Mills. The city is also home to the Ballet East Dance Company, a modern dance ensemble, and the Tapestry Dance Company which performs a variety of dance genres.

The Austin Improvisational theatre scene has several theaters: ColdTowne Theater, The Hideout Theater, and The Fallout Theater. Austin also hosts the Out of Bounds Comedy Festival, which draws comedic artists in all disciplines to Austin. Earlier Austin improv festivals included the Big Stinkin' International Improv & Sketch Comedy Festival, held from 1996 to 1999.

=== Libraries ===
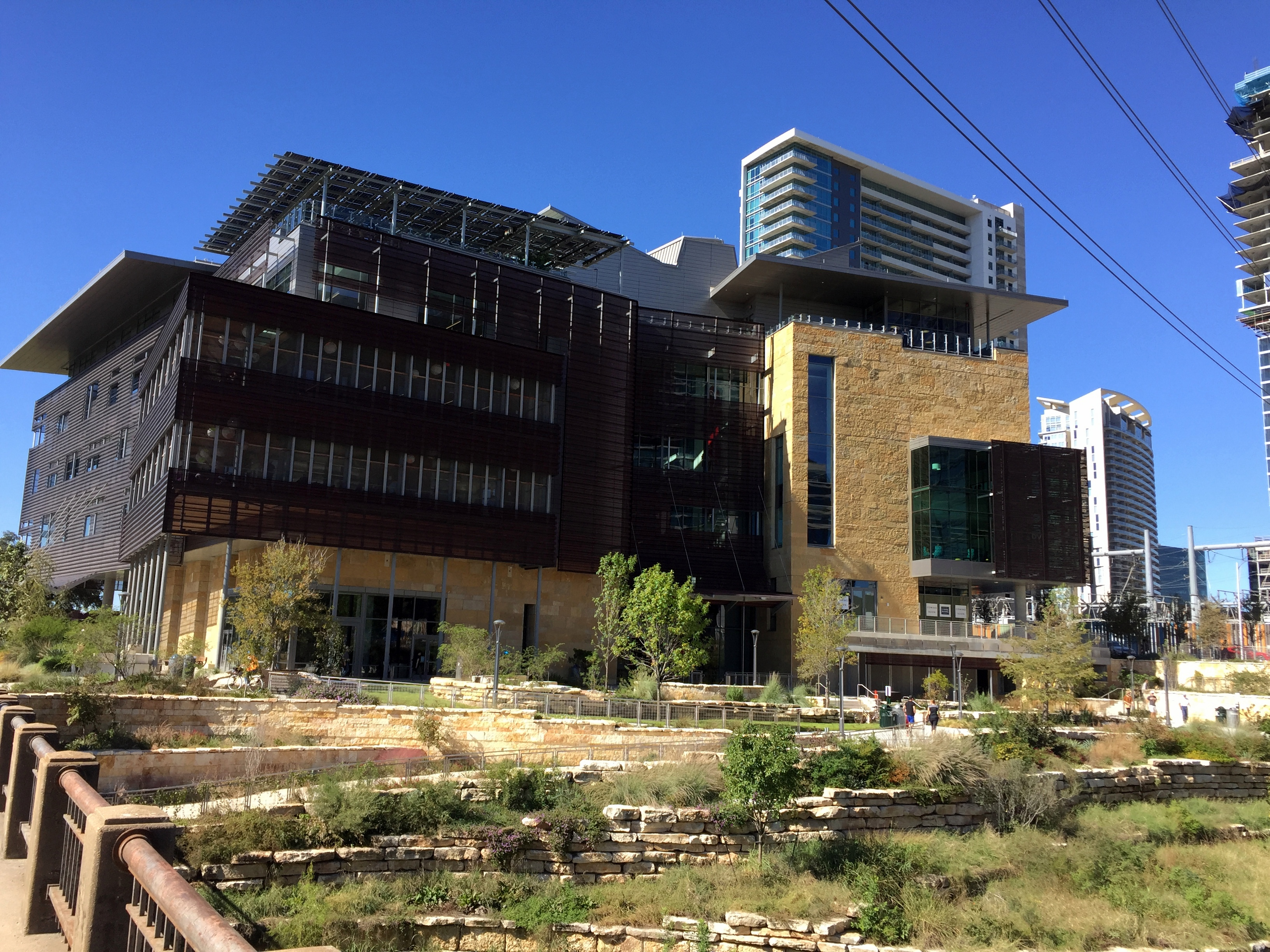
A view of Austin Central Library from César Chávez Street

The Austin Public Library is operated by the City of Austin and consists of the Central Library on César Chávez Street, the Austin History Center, 20 branches and the Recycled Reads bookstore and upcycling facility. The APL library system also has mobile libraries – bookmobile buses and a human-powered trike and trailer called "unbound: sin fronteras".

The Central Library, which is an anchor to the redevelopment of the former Seaholm Power Plant site and the Shoal Creek Walk, opened on October 28, 2017. The six-story Central Library contains a living rooftop garden, reading porches, an indoor reading room, bicycle parking station, large indoor and outdoor event spaces, a gift shop, an art gallery, café, and a "technology petting zoo" where visitors can play with next-generation gadgets like 3D printers. In 2018, Time magazine named the Austin Central Library on its list of "World's Greatest Places".

=== Museums and other points of interest ===
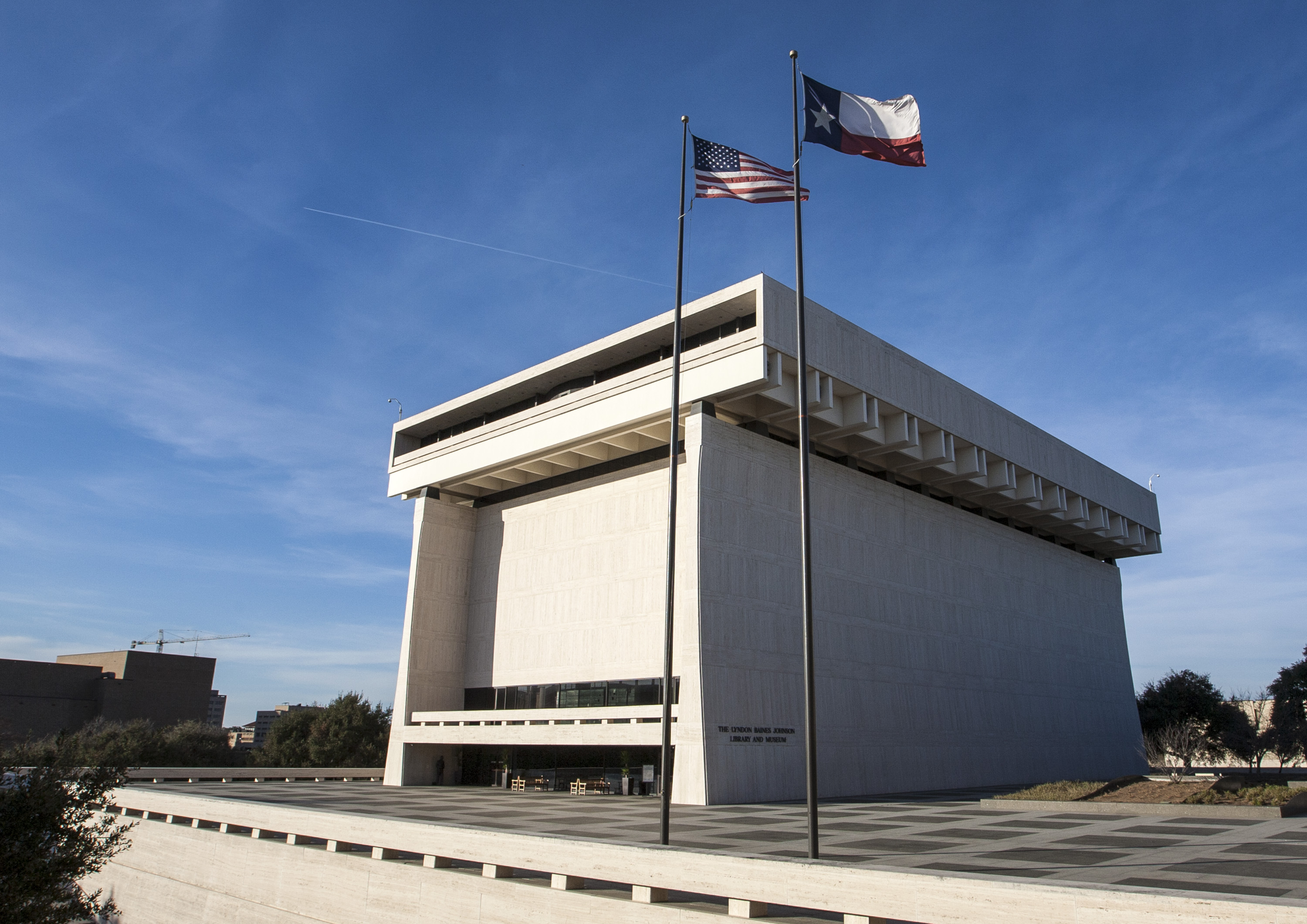
The Lyndon Baines Johnson Presidential Library on the University of Texas campus in Austin

Museums in Austin include the Texas Science and Natural History Museum, the George Washington Carver Museum and Cultural Center, Thinkery, the Blanton Museum of Art (reopened in 2006), the Bob Bullock Texas State History Museum across the street (which opened in 2000), The Contemporary Austin, the Elisabet Ney Museum, the Women and Their Work gallery, and the galleries at the Harry Ransom Center. The Texas State Capitol itself is also a major tourist attraction.

The Driskill Hotel, built in 1886, once owned by George W. Littlefield, and located at 6th and Brazos streets, was finished just before the construction of the Capitol building. Sixth Street is a musical hub for the city. The Enchanted Forest, a multi-acre outdoor music, art, and performance art space in South Austin hosts events such as fire-dancing and circus-like-acts. Austin is also home to the Lyndon Baines Johnson Library and Museum, which houses documents and artifacts related to the Johnson administration, including LBJ's limousine and a re-creation of the Oval Office.

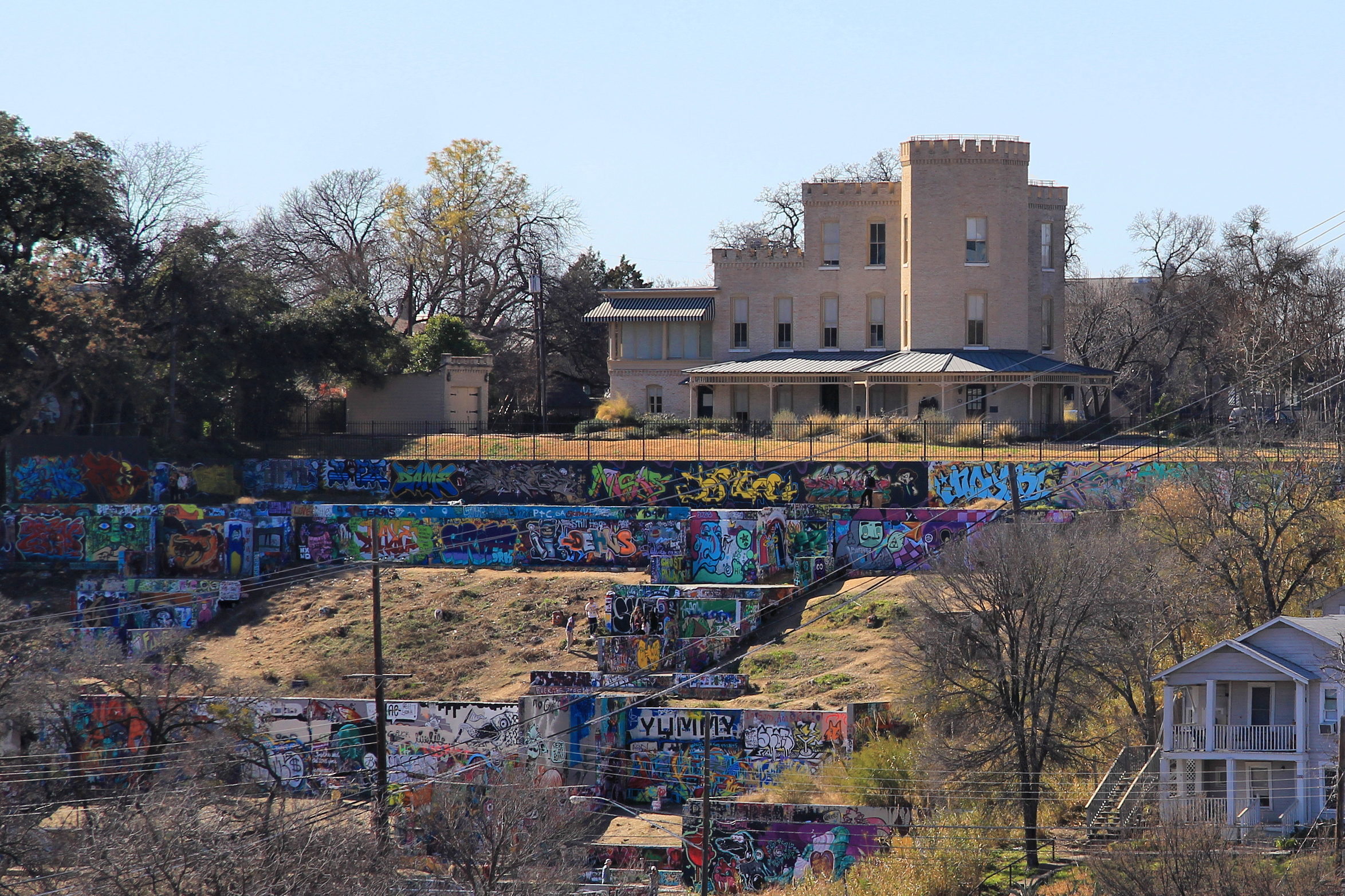
The HOPE Outdoor Gallery, overlooked by the historic Texas Military Academy building, the oldest standing educational building in Texas. The gallery has since been demolished.

Locally produced art is featured at the South Austin Museum of Popular Culture. The Mexic-Arte Museum is a Mexican and Mexican-American art museum founded in 1983. Austin is also home to the O. Henry Museum, which served as the residence of O. Henry from 1893 to 1895. Farmers' markets are popular attractions, providing a variety of locally grown and often organic foods.

Austin also has many odd statues and landmarks, such as the Stevie Ray Vaughan Memorial, the Willie Nelson statue, the Mangia dinosaur, the Loca Maria lady at Taco Xpress, the Hyde Park Gym's giant flexed arm, and Daniel Johnston's Hi, How are You? Jeremiah the Innocent frog mural.

The Ann W. Richards Congress Avenue Bridge houses the world's largest urban population of Mexican free-tailed bats. Starting in March, up to 1.5 million bats take up residence inside the bridge's expansion and contraction zones as well as in long horizontal grooves running the length of the bridge's underside, an environment ideally suited for raising their young. Every evening around sunset, the bats emerge in search of insects, an exit visible on weather radar. Watching the bat emergence is an event that is popular with locals and tourists, with more than 100,000 viewers per year. The bats migrate to Mexico each winter.

The Austin Zoo, located in unincorporated western Travis County, is a rescue zoo that provides sanctuary to displaced animals from a variety of situations, including those involving neglect.

The HOPE Outdoor Gallery was a public, three-story outdoor street art project located on Baylor Street in the Clarksville neighborhood. The gallery, which consisted of the foundations of a failed multifamily development, was a constantly-evolving canvas of graffiti and murals. Also known as "Castle Hill" or simply "Graffiti Park", the site on Baylor Street was closed to the public in early January 2019 but remained intact, behind a fence and with an armed guard, in mid-March 2019. The gallery will build a new art park at Carson Creek Ranch in Southeast Austin.

=== Sports ===
Austin area professional sports teams
Club	Sport	Founded	League	Venue
Austin Bats	Basketball	2014	American Basketball Association	Travis Early College High School
Austin Crows	Australian rules football	2002	United States Australian Football League	Onion Creek Soccer Complex
Austin FC	Soccer	2018	Major League Soccer	Q2 Stadium
Austin Outlaws	Quadball	2016	Major League Quadball	Round Rock Multipurpose Complex
Austin Rise FC	Soccer	2022	WPSL PRO	House Park
Austin Sol	Ultimate	2016	Ultimate Frisbee Association	Chaparral Stadium
Austin Spurs	Basketball	2005	NBA G League	H-E-B Center at Cedar Park
Austin Torch	Ultimate	2019	Premier Ultimate League	Rudolph Gamblin Field
Round Rock Express	Baseball	2000	Pacific Coast League (AAA)	Dell Diamond
Texas Stars	Ice hockey	2009	American Hockey League	H-E-B Center at Cedar Park

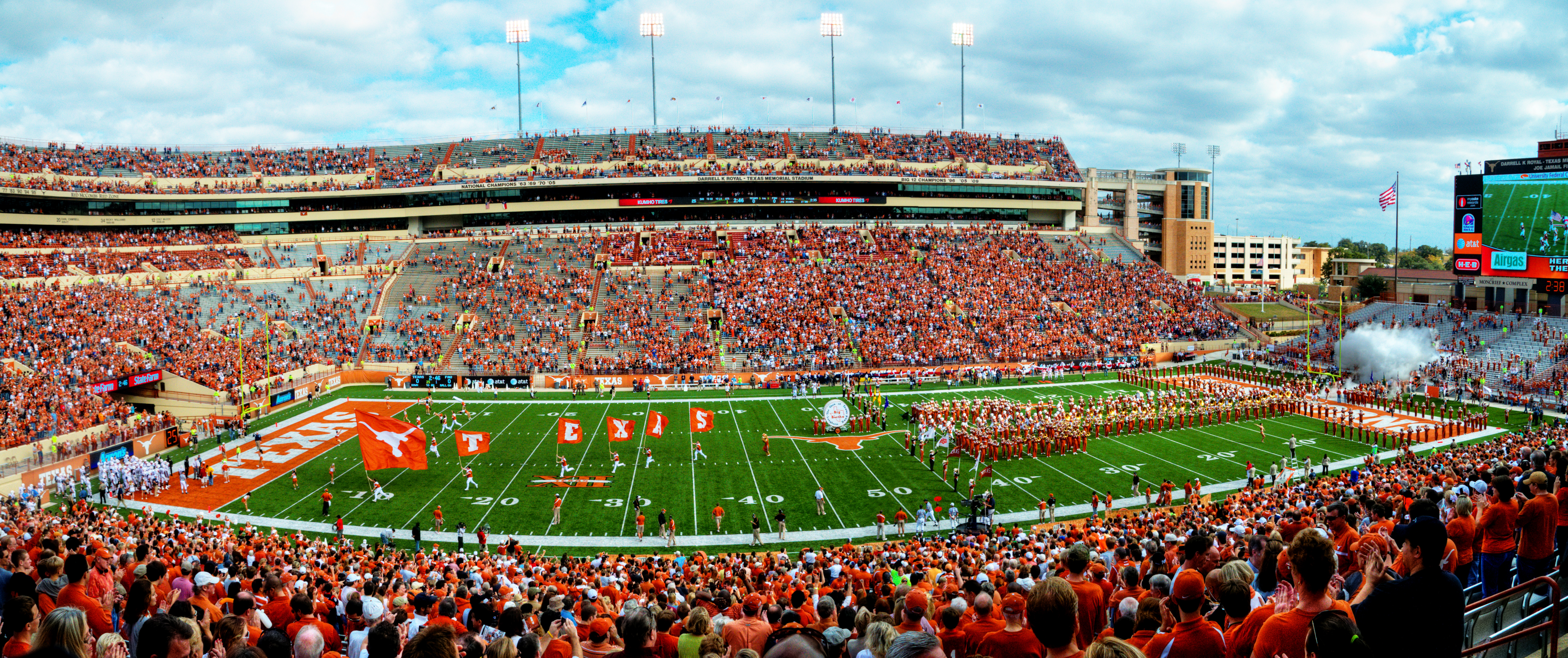
Darrell K Royal–Texas Memorial Stadium, home of Texas Longhorns football

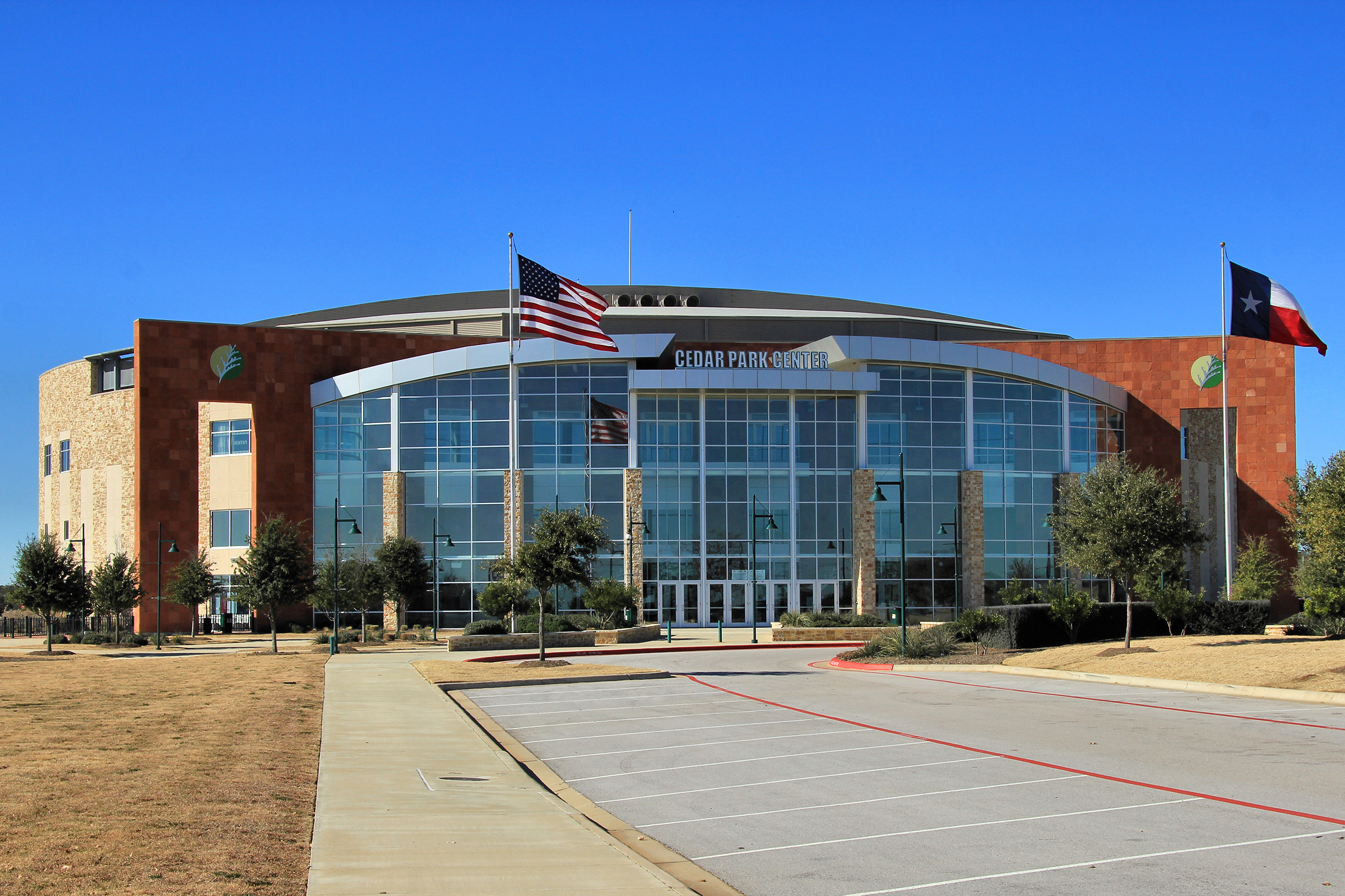
H-E-B Center stadium located in Cedar Park, Texas

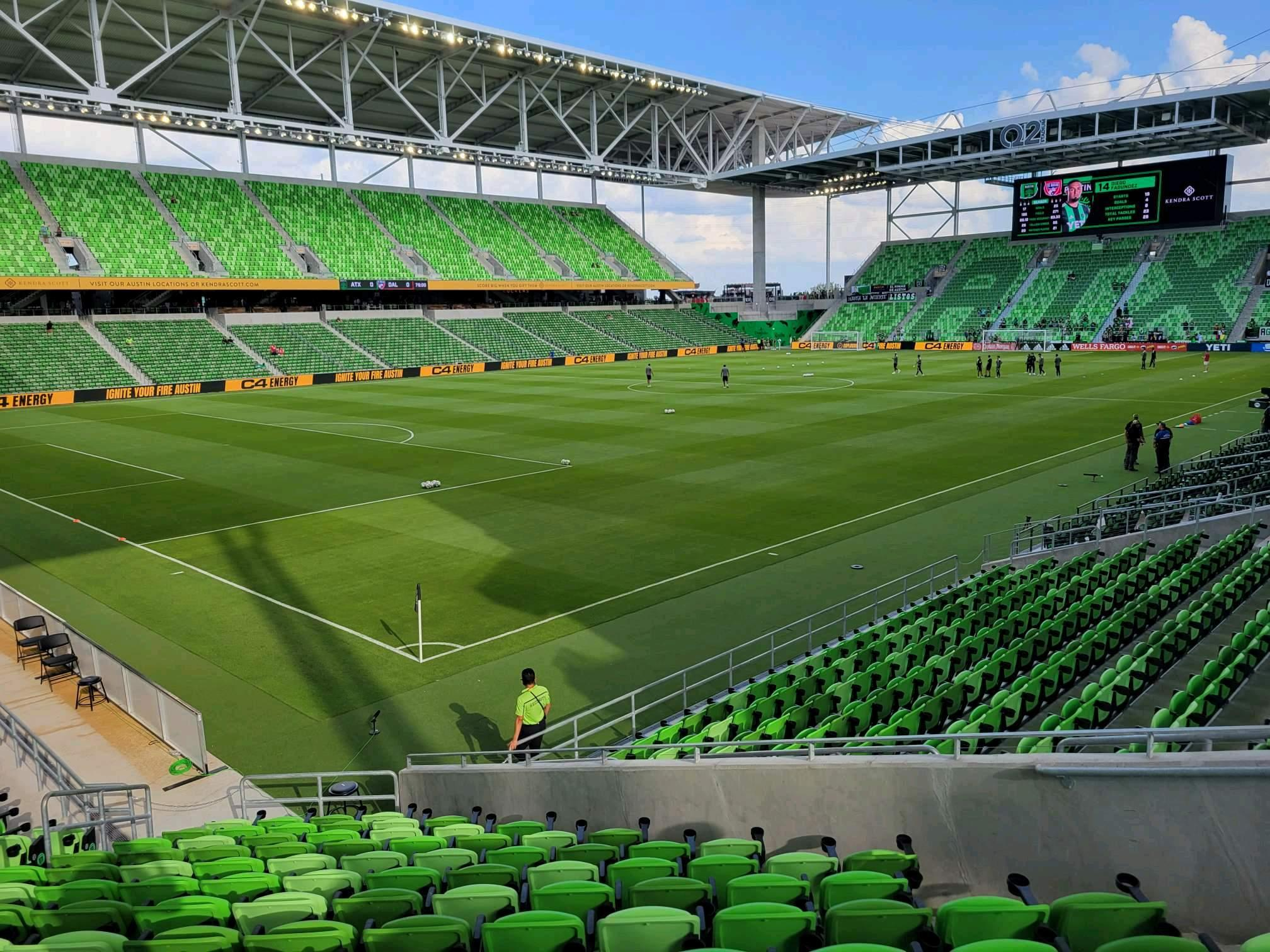
Q2 Stadium of Austin FC

Many Austinites support the athletic programs of the University of Texas at Austin known as the Texas Longhorns. During the 2005–2006 academic term, the Longhorns football team was named the NCAA Division I FBS National Football Champion, and the Longhorns baseball team won the College World Series. The football team plays its home games in the state's second-largest sports stadium, Darrell K Royal–Texas Memorial Stadium, seating over 101,000 fans. Baseball games are played at UFCU Disch–Falk Field.

Austin was the most populous city in the United States without a major-league professional sports team, which changed in 2021 with Austin FC's entry to MLS. Minor-league professional sports came to Austin in 1996, when the Austin Ice Bats began playing at the Travis County Expo Center; they were later replaced by the AHL Texas Stars. Austin has hosted a number of other professional teams, including the Austin Spurs of the NBA G League, the Austin Aztex of the United Soccer League, the Austin Outlaws in WFA football, and the Austin Aces in WTT tennis.

Natural features like the bicycle-friendly Texas Hill Country and generally mild climate make Austin the home of several endurance and multi-sport races and communities. The Capitol 10,000 is the largest 10 k race in Texas, and approximately fifth largest in the United States. The Austin Marathon has been run in the city every year since 1992. Additionally, the city is home to the largest 5 mile race in Texas, named the Turkey Trot as it is run annually on Thanksgiving. Started in 1991 by Thundercloud Subs, a local sandwich chain (who still sponsors the event), the event has grown to host over 20,000 runners. All proceeds are donated to Caritas of Austin, a local charity.

The Austin-founded American Swimming Association hosts several swim races around town. Austin is also the hometown of several cycling groups and the disgraced cyclist Lance Armstrong. Combining these three disciplines is a growing crop of triathlons, including the Capital of Texas Triathlon held every Memorial Day on and around Lady Bird Lake, Auditorium Shores, and Downtown Austin.

Austin is home to the Circuit of the Americas (COTA), a grade 1 Fédération Internationale de l'Automobile specification 3.427-mile (5.515 km) motor racing facility which hosts the Formula One United States Grand Prix. The State of Texas has pledged $25 million in public funds annually for 10 years to pay the sanctioning fees for the race. Built at an estimated cost of $250 to $300 million, the circuit opened in 2012 and is located just east of the Austin Bergstrom International Airport. The circuit also hosts the EchoPark Automotive Grand Prix NASCAR race in late March each year.

The summer of 2014 marked the inaugural season for World TeamTennis team Austin Aces, formerly Orange County Breakers of the southern California region. The Austin Aces played their matches at the Cedar Park Center northwest of Austin, and featured former professionals Andy Roddick and Marion Bartoli, as well as current WTA tour player Vera Zvonareva. The team left after the 2015 season.

In 2017, Precourt Sports Ventures announced a plan to move the Columbus Crew SC soccer franchise from Columbus, Ohio to Austin. Precourt negotiated an agreement with the City of Austin to build a $200 million privately funded stadium on public land at 10414 McKalla Place, following initial interest in Butler Shores Metropolitan Park and Roy G. Guerrero Colorado River Park. As part of an arrangement with the league, operational rights of Columbus Crew SC were sold in late 2018, and Austin FC was announced as Major League Soccer's 27th franchise on January 15, 2019, with the expansion team starting play in 2021.

The Austin Country Club is a private golf club located along the shores of the Colorado River, right next to the Pennybacker Bridge. Founded in 1899, the club moved to its third and present site in 1984, which features a challenging layout designed by noted course architect Pete Dye.

Austin hosted the BLAST.TV Austin Major, the 22nd Counter-Strike Major esports tournament, from June 9 to 22, 2025.

== Government ==
=== City government ===
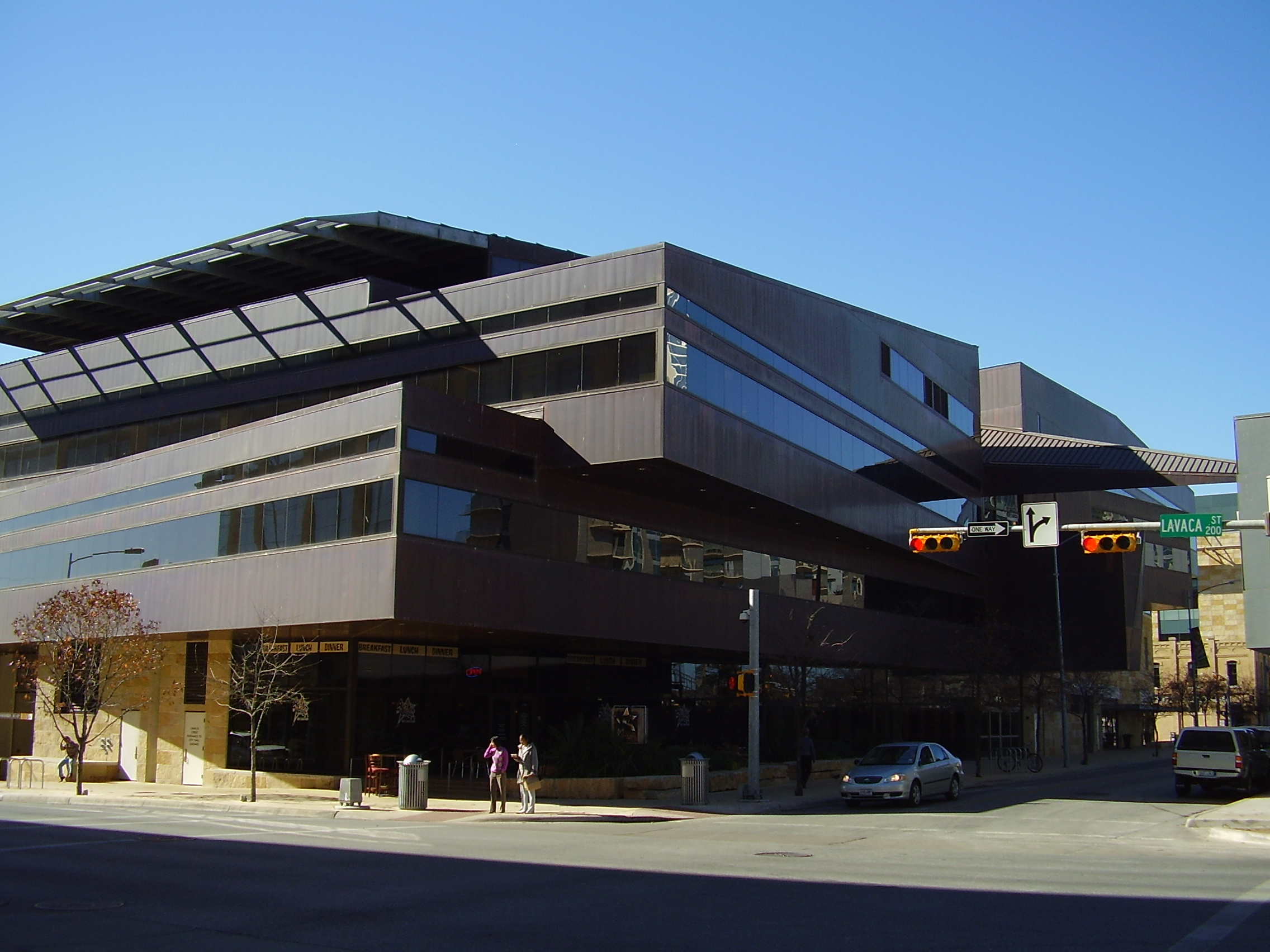
Austin City Hall

Austin is administered by an 11-member city council (10 council members elected by geographic district plus a mayor elected at large). The council is accompanied by a hired city manager under the manager-council system of municipal governance. Council and mayoral elections are non-partisan, with a runoff in case there is no majority winner. A referendum approved by voters on November 6, 2012, changed the council composition from six council members plus a mayor elected at large to the current "10+1" district system. Supporters maintained that the at-large system would increase participation for all areas of the city, especially for those which had lacked representation from City Council.

November 2014 marked the first election under the new system. The Federal government had forced San Antonio and Dallas to abandon at-large systems before 1987; however, the court could not show a racist pattern in Austin and upheld the city's at-large system during a 1984 lawsuit. In five elections between 1973 and 1994 Austin voters rejected single-member districts.

Austin formerly operated its city hall at 128 West 8th Street. Antoine Predock and Cotera Kolar Negrete & Reed Architects designed a new city hall building, which was intended to reflect what The Dallas Morning News referred to as a "crazy-quilt vitality, that embraces everything from country music to environmental protests and high-tech swagger". The new city hall, built from recycled materials, has solar panels in its garage. The city hall, at 301 West Second Street, opened in November 2004. Kirk Watson is the current mayor of Austin, assuming the office for a second non-consecutive term on January 6, 2023.

In the 2012 elections, City Council elections were moved from May to November and City council members were given staggered term limits In 2022 Proposition D moved the term of the Austin Mayor to coincide with Presidential election years, so Kirk Watson would only serve two years unlike his predecessor Steve Adler

Law enforcement in Austin is provided by the Austin Police Department, except for state government buildings, which are patrolled by the Texas Department of Public Safety. The University of Texas Police operate from the University of Texas.

Fire protection within the city limits is provided by the Austin Fire Department, while the surrounding county is divided into twelve geographical areas known as emergency services districts, which are covered by separate regional fire departments. Emergency medical services are provided for the whole county by Austin-Travis County Emergency Medical Services.

In 2003, the city adopted a resolution against the USA PATRIOT Act that reaffirmed constitutionally guaranteed rights.

The current mayor of Austin is Kirk Watson. As of 2025, though positions are officiallly nonpartisan, all elected member of the city council are Democrats.

History of City Managers
Name	Term Start	References
T. C. Broadnax	2024 May	
Jesús Garza (interim)	2023 Feb	
Spencer Cronk	2017 Dec	
Elaine Hart (interim)	2016 Oct 30	
Marc Ott	2008 Feb	
Toby Futrell	2002	
Jesús Garza	1994	
...		

=== Crime ===
As of 2019, Austin is one of the safest large cities in the United States. In 2019, the FBI named Austin the 11th safest city on a list of 22 American cities with a population above 400,000.

FBI statistics show that overall violent and property crimes dropped in Austin in 2015, but increased in suburban areas of the city. One such southeastern suburb, Del Valle, reported eight homicides within two months in 2016. According to 2016 APD crime statistics, the 78723 census tract had the most violent crime, with 6 murders, 25 rapes, and 81 robberies. The city had 39 homicides in 2016, the most since 1997.

==== Notable incidents ====
In 1884 and 1885, one of the earliest recorded serial killings in the United States occurred in Austin, in which 8 people were murdered by a suspect known as the "Servant Girl Annihilator".

One of the first American mass school shooting incidents took place in Austin on August 1, 1966, when Charles Whitman shot 43 people, killing 13 from the top of the University of Texas tower. The University of Texas tower shooting led to the formation of the SWAT team of the Austin Police Department.

In 1991, four teenage girls were murdered in a yogurt shop by serial killer Robert Eugene Brashers. A police officer responded to reports of a fire at the I Can't Believe It's Yogurt! store on Anderson Lane and discovered the girls' bodies in a back room. The murders were unsolved until 2025.

In 2010, Andrew Joseph Stack III deliberately crashed his Piper PA-28 Cherokee into Echelon 1, a building in which the Internal Revenue Service was a lessee of, housing 190 employees. The resulting explosion killed one and injured 13 IRS employees, partially damaged the building and cost the IRS a total of $38.6 million. (see 2010 Austin suicide attack)

A series of bombings occurred in Austin in March 2018. Over the course of 20 days, five package bombs exploded, killing two people and injuring another five. The suspect, 23-year-old Mark Anthony Conditt of Pflugerville, Texas, blew himself up inside his vehicle after he was pulled over by police on March 21, also injuring a police officer.

In 2020, Austin was the victim of a cyberattack by the Russian group Berserk Bear, possibly related to the U.S. federal government data breach earlier that year.

On April 18, 2021, a shooting occurred at the Arboretum Oaks Apartments near The Arboretum shopping center, in which a former Travis County Sheriff's Office detective killed his ex-wife, his adoptive daughter, and his daughter's boyfriend. The suspect, who was previously charged with child sexual assault, was arrested in Manor after a 20-hour manhunt.

A mass shooting took place in the early morning of June 12, 2021, on Sixth Street, which resulted in 14 people injured and one dead. The man killed was believed to be an innocent bystander who was struck as he was standing outside a bar. A 19-year-old suspect, De'ondre "Dre" White, was formally charged and arrested in Killeen nearly two weeks after the shooting.

In 2024, Zacharia Doar, a 23-year old Palestinian-American man, was attacked and stabbed in the chest on West 26th Street, West Campus, after returning from a rally in support of Palestinian human rights. The assailant, 36-year old Bert James Baker was arrested at the scene and charged with aggravated assault with a deadly weapon.

On August 11, 2025, a mass shooting occurred outside a Target store in North Austin, killing three people. The suspect fled the Target by hijacking a car belonging to one of the victims. After leaving the Target area, the suspect crashed the stolen vehicle and proceeded to steal another vehicle from a car dealership. The suspect was later taken into custody after being subdued with a Taser. He was later identified as a 32-year-old male.

=== Other levels of government ===
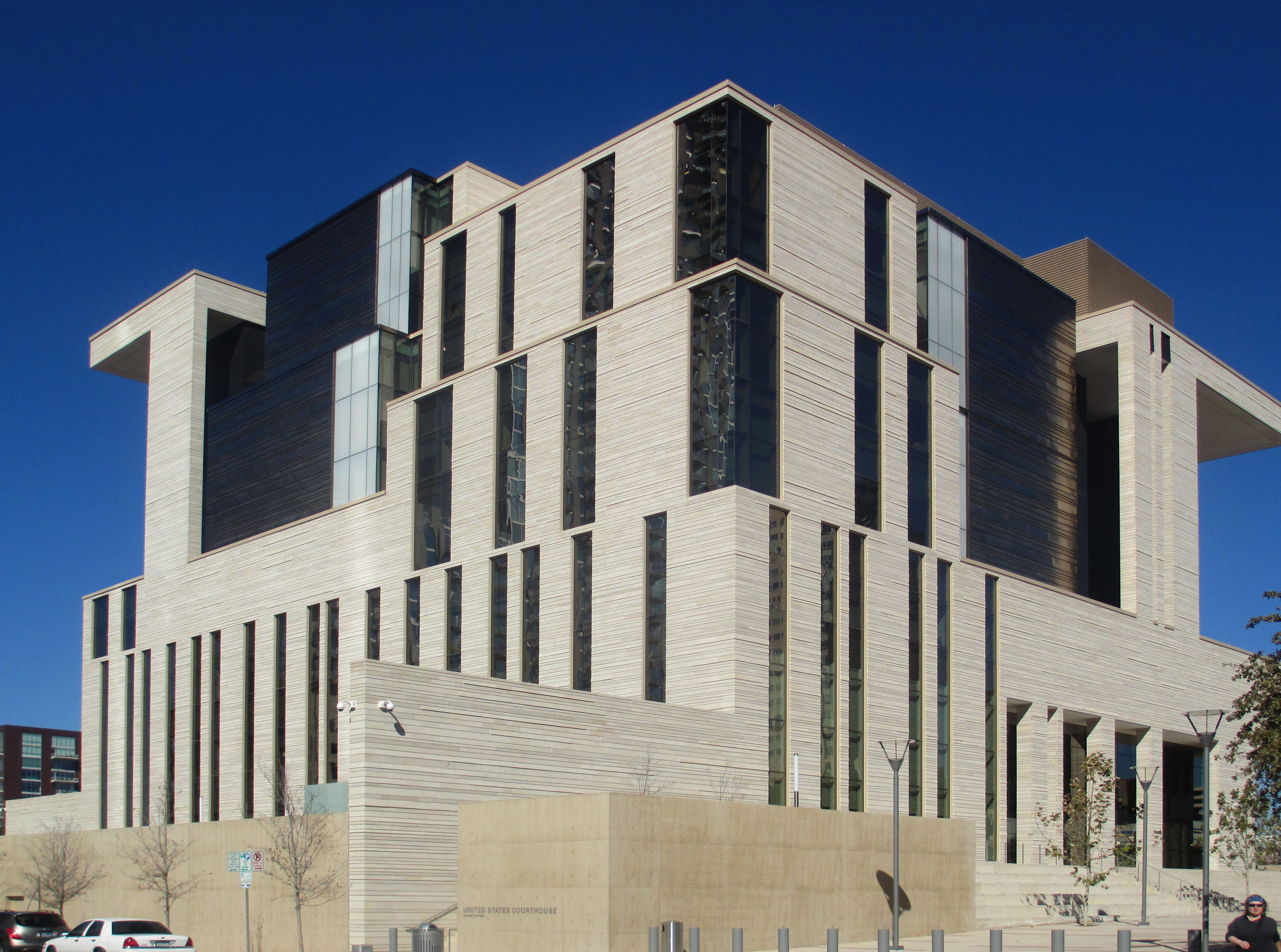
The 8-story U.S. Courthouse is located at Fourth, Fifth, San Antonio, and Nueces streets, opened December 2012.

Austin is the county seat of Travis County and hosts the Heman Marion Sweatt Travis County Courthouse downtown, as well as other county government offices. The Texas Department of Transportation operates the Austin District Office in Austin. The Texas Department of Criminal Justice (TDCJ) operates the Austin I and Austin II district parole offices in Austin. The United States Postal Service operates several post offices in Austin.

=== Politics ===
Former Governor Rick Perry referred to the city as a "blueberry in the tomato soup", alluding to the fact that Austin has long been a solidly Democratic city in a Republican-leaning state. However, other major urban areas in Texas have quickly swung blue in recent years; the nine largest cities of the state are all based in counties that James Talarico won in the 2026 federal Senate election.

After the most recent redistricting, Austin is currently divided between the 10th, 11th, 17th, 27th, and 37th Congressional districts.

United States presidential election results in Travis County
Year	Republican	Democratic
2024	29.4% 170,613	68.7% 398,253
2020	26.4% 161,337	71.4% 435,860
2016	27.4% 126,750	66.3% 306,475
2012	36.2% 140,152	60.1% 232,788
2008	34.3% 136,981	63.5% 254,017
2004	42.0% 147,885	56.0% 197,235
2000	46.9% 141,235	41.7% 125,526
1996	39.9% 98,454	52.3% 128,970
1992	31.9% 88,105	47.3% 130,546
1988	44.9% 105,915	54.1% 127,783
1984	56.8% 124,944	42.8% 94,124
1980	45.7% 73,151	46.9% 75,028
1976	46.7% 71,031	51.6% 78,585
1972	56.3% 70,561	43.2% 54,157
1968	41.6% 34,309	48.1% 39,667
1964	31.0% 19,838	68.9% 44,058
1960	44.9% 22,107	54.9% 27,022

==== Issues ====
A controversial turning point in the political history of the Austin area was the 2003 Texas redistricting. Before then, Austin had been entirely or almost entirely within the borders of a single congressional district–what was then the 10th District–for over a century. Opponents characterized the resulting district layout as excessively partisan gerrymandering, and the plan was challenged in court by Democratic and minority activists. The Supreme Court of the United States has never struck down a redistricting plan for being excessively partisan.

In late 2003, the plan was upheld by a three-judge federal panel. In June 2006, the matter was largely settled when the Supreme Court, in a 7–2 decision, upheld the entire congressional redistricting plan with the exception of a Hispanic-majority district in southwest Texas. This affected Austin's districting, as U.S. Rep. Lloyd Doggett's district (U.S. Congressional District 25) was found to be insufficiently compact to compensate for the reduced minority influence in the southwest district; it was redrawn so that it took in most of southeastern Travis County and several counties to its south and east.

==== Environmental movement ====
The distinguishing political movement of Austin politics has been that of the environmental movement, which spawned the parallel neighborhood movement, then the more recent conservationist movement (as typified by the Hill Country Conservancy), and eventually the current ongoing debate about "sense of place" and preserving the Austin quality of life. Much of the environmental movement has matured into a debate on issues related to saving and creating an Austin "sense of place".

In 2012, Austin became just one of a few cities in Texas to ban the sale and use of plastic bags. The ban ended in 2018 due to a court ruling that regarded all bag bans in the state to contravene the Texas Solid Waste Disposal Act. In 2016, Austin became the first Gold designee of the SolSmart program, a national program from the U.S. Department of Energy that recognizes local governments for enacting solar-friendly measures at the local level.

== Education ==
According to the 2015–2019 Census estimates, 51.7% of Austin residents aged 25 and over have earned at least a bachelor's degree, compared with the national figure of 32.1%. 19.4% hold a graduate or professional degree, compared with the national figure of 12.4%.

=== Higher education ===
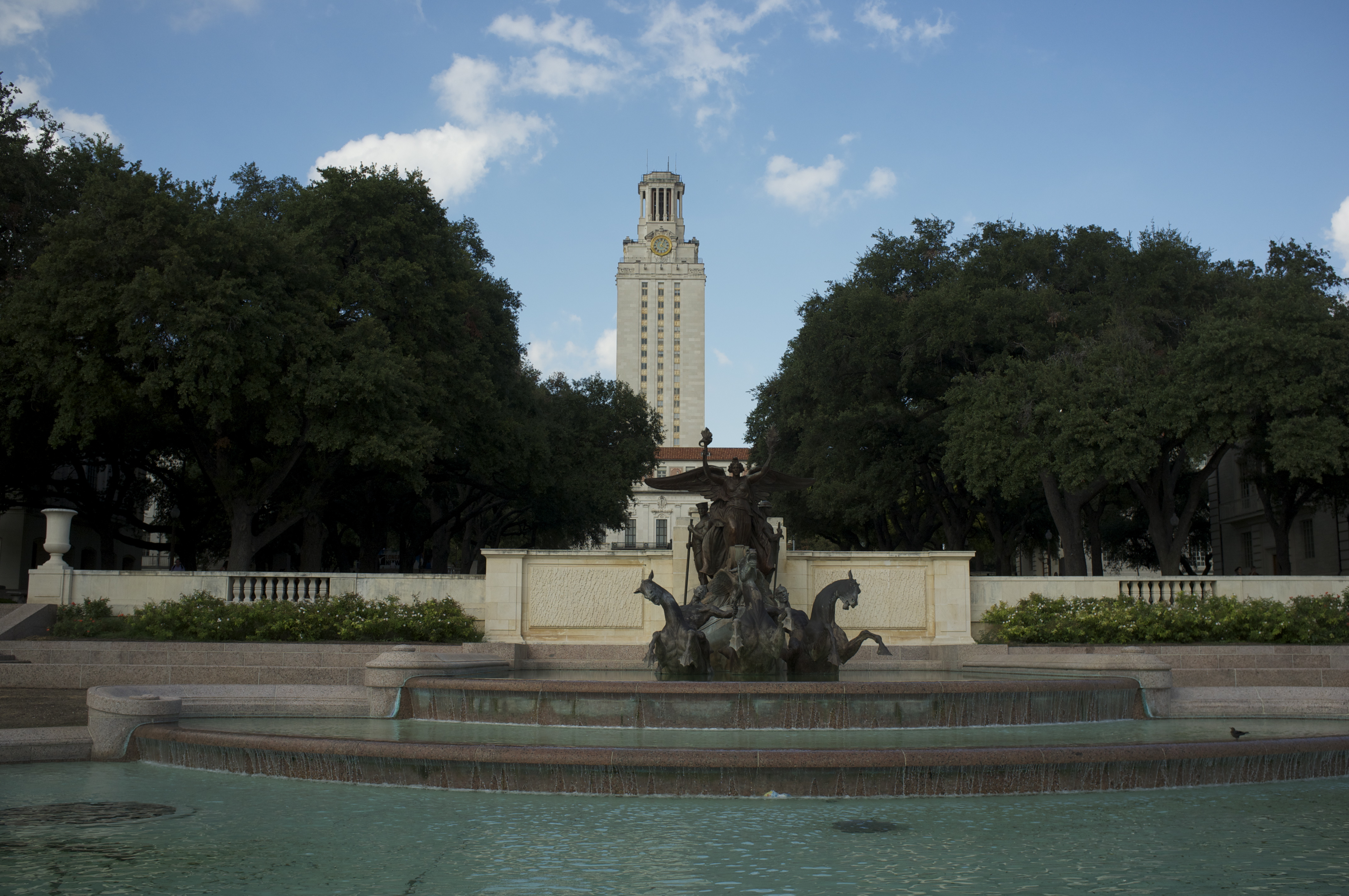
The University of Texas at Austin

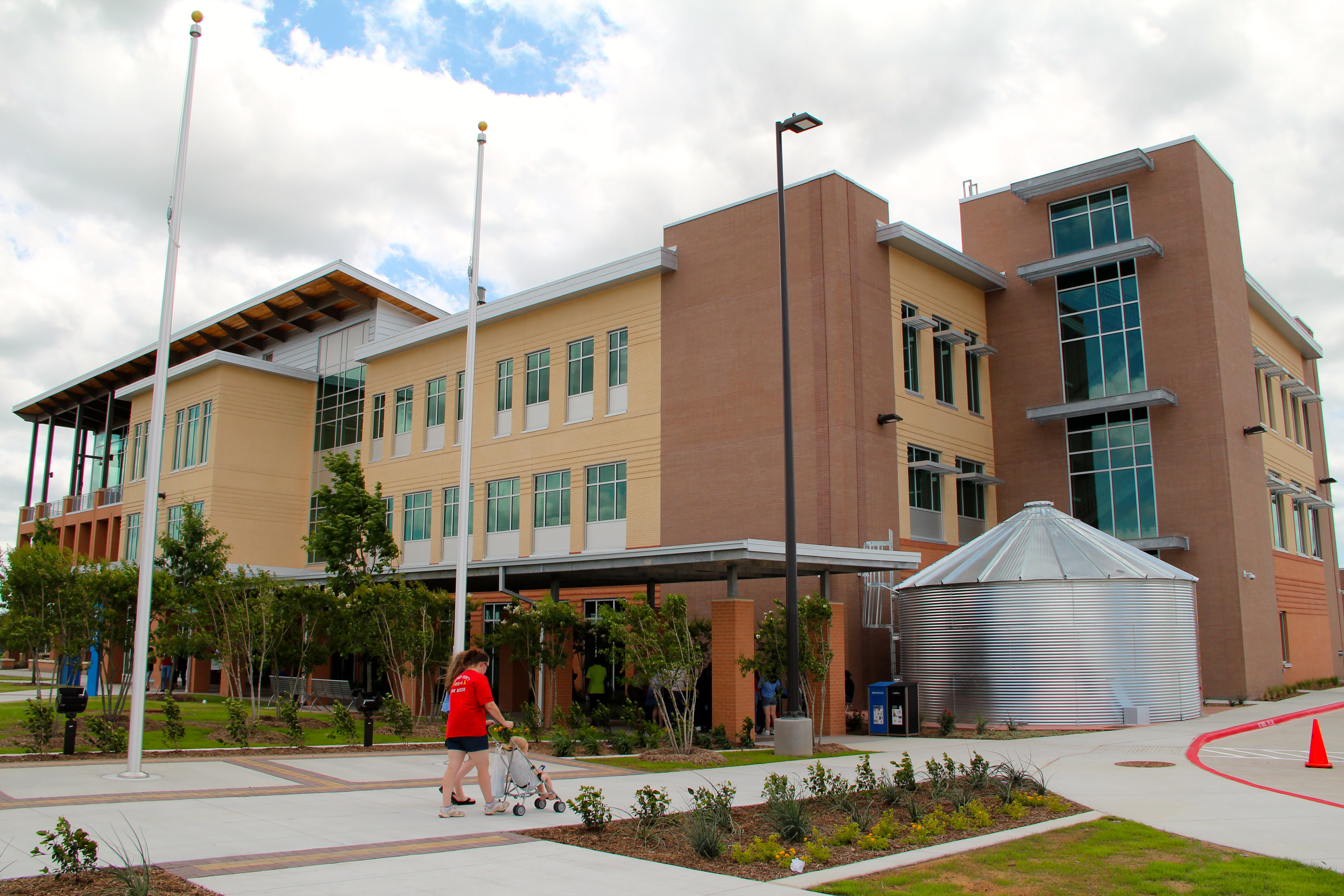
Austin Community College

Austin is home to the University of Texas at Austin, the flagship institution of the University of Texas System with over 40,000 undergraduate students and 11,000 graduate students.

Other institutions of higher learning in Austin include St. Edward's University, Huston–Tillotson University, Austin Community College, Concordia University, the Seminary of the Southwest, Texas Health and Science University, University of St. Augustine for Health Sciences, Austin Graduate School of Theology, Austin Presbyterian Theological Seminary, Virginia College's Austin Campus, Auguste Escoffier School of Culinary Arts' Austin Campus, The Art Institute of Austin, Southern Careers Institute of Austin, Austin Conservatory and branch campuses of Case Western Reserve University and Park University.

The University of Texas System and Texas State University System are headquartered in downtown Austin.

=== Public primary and secondary education ===
Approximately half of the city by area is served by the Austin Independent School District. This district includes notable schools such as the magnet Liberal Arts and Science Academy High School of Austin, Texas (LASA), which, by test scores, has consistently been within the top thirty high schools in the nation, as well as The Ann Richards School for Young Women Leaders. The remaining portion of Austin is served by adjoining school districts, including Round Rock ISD, Pflugerville ISD, Leander ISD, Manor ISD, Del Valle ISD, Lake Travis ISD, Hays ISD, and Eanes ISD.

The Austin metropolitan area includes 27 charter school systems. University of Texas Elementary School is in the city.

There are two state-operated schools for children with disabilities: Texas School for the Blind and Visually Impaired and Texas School for the Deaf. Texas Blind, Deaf, and Orphan School, in the segregation era, had black deaf and blind students.

=== Private education ===
The Austin metropolitan area includes over 100 private schools. Austin is also home to several child developmental institutions.

== Mass media ==
Austin's main daily newspaper is the Austin American-Statesman. The Austin Chronicle is Austin's alternative weekly, while The Daily Texan is the student newspaper of the University of Texas at Austin. Austin's business newspaper is the weekly Austin Business Journal. The Austin Monitor is an online outlet that specializes in insider reporting on City Hall, Travis County Commissioners Court, AISD, and other related local civics beats. The Monitor is backed by the nonprofit Capital of Texas Media Foundation. Austin also has numerous smaller special interest or sub-regional newspapers such as the Oak Hill Gazette, Westlake Picayune, Hill Country News, Round Rock Leader, NOKOA, and The Villager among others. Texas Monthly, a major regional magazine, is also headquartered in Austin. Austin Way is a luxury lifestyle magazine serving Austin's affluent community, published seven times a year by Modern Luxury Media. The Texas Observer, a muckraking biweekly political magazine, has been based in Austin for over five decades. The weekly Community Impact Newspaper published by John Garrett, former publisher of the Austin Business Journal has five regional editions and is delivered to every house and business within certain ZIP codes and all of the news is specific to those ZIP codes.

Another statewide publication based in Austin is The Texas Tribune, an on-line publication focused on Texas politics. The Tribune is "user-supported" through donations, a business model similar to public radio. The editor is Evan Smith, former editor of Texas Monthly. Smith co-founded the Texas Tribune, a nonprofit, non-partisan public media organization, with Austin venture capitalist John Thornton and veteran journalist Ross Ramsey.

Commercial radio stations include KASE-FM (country), KVET (sports), KVET-FM (country), KKMJ-FM (adult contemporary), KLBJ (talk), KLBJ-FM (classic rock), KJFK (variety hits), KFMK (contemporary Christian), KOKE-FM (progressive country) and KPEZ (rhythmic contemporary). KUT-FM is the leading public radio station in Texas and produces the majority of its content locally. KOOP (FM) is a volunteer-run radio station with more than 60 locally produced programs. KVRX is the student-run college radio station of the University of Texas at Austin with a focus on local and non-mainstream music and community programming. Other listener-supported stations include KAZI (urban contemporary), and KMFA (classical).

Network television stations (affiliations in parentheses) include KTBC (Fox O&O), KVUE (ABC), KXAN (NBC), KEYE-TV (CBS), KLRU (PBS), KNVA (The CW), KBVO (MyNetworkTV), and KAKW (Univision O&O). KLRU produces several award-winning locally produced programs such as Austin City Limits. Despite Austin's explosive growth, it is only a medium-sized market (currently 38th) because the suburban and rural areas are not much larger than the city proper. Additionally, the proximity of San Antonio truncates the potential market area.

Alex Jones, journalist, radio show host and filmmaker, produces his talk show The Alex Jones Show in Austin which broadcasts nationally on more than 60 AM and FM radio stations in the United States, WWCR Radio shortwave and XM Radio: Channel 166.

== International relations ==
Austin has two types of relationships with other cities, sister and friendship.

=== Sister cities ===
Austin's sister cities are:

- Adelaide, South Australia, Australia (1983)
- Angers, Pays de la Loire, France (2011)
- Antalya, Antalya Province, Turkey (2009)
- Gwangmyeong, Gyeonggi-do, South Korea (2001)
- Hackney, London, United Kingdom (2014)
- Koblenz, Rhineland-Palatinate, Germany (1991)
- Lima, Peru (1981)
- Maseru, Lesotho (1978)
- Ōita, Ōita, Japan (1990)
- Pune, Maharashtra, India (2018)
- Saltillo, Coahuila, Mexico (1968)
- Taichung, Taiwan (1986)
- Xishuangbanna, Yunnan, China (1997)

The cities of Belo Horizonte, Brazil and Elche, Spain were formerly sister cities, but after an Austin City Council vote in 1991, their statuses were deactivated. Orlu, South East, Nigeria became a sister city in 2000, but was downgraded to emeritus status later.

=== Friendship cities ===
Covenants between two city leaders:

- Siem Reap, Cambodia (2011)
- Villefranche-sur-Mer, France (2010)
- Tehuacán, Puebla, Mexico (2019)
- San Luis Potosí, San Luis Potosí, Mexico (2024)
- Chiang Mai, Thailand (2023)
- Greater Manchester, England, United Kingdom (2025)

== See also ==
- List of companies based in Austin, Texas
- List of people from Austin, Texas
- National Register of Historic Places listings in Travis County, Texas
- Music of Austin, Texas
- List of Austin neighborhoods
