= Louis Johnson (dancer) =

American dancer and choreographer (1930–2020)

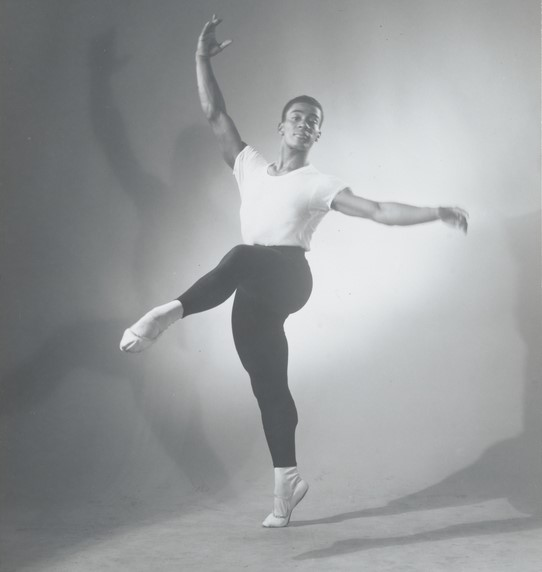
- Born: March 19, 1930; Statesville, North Carolina
- Died: March 31, 2020 (aged 90); Manhattan, New York
- Occupations: Dancer, choreographer

Louis Johnson (March 19, 1930 – March 31, 2020) was an American dancer, choreographer, teacher, and director whose work spanned ballet and modern dance.

== Early life ==
Johnson was born on March 19, 1930, in Statesville, North Carolina, and grew up in Washington, D.C., raised by his mother and grandmother. During his childhood, he was active in an acrobatics group at his local YMCA. When the facility was undergoing renovations, the group was invited to practice at the Jones-Haywood School of Ballet, leading Doris Jones and Claire Haywood to offer him a scholarship to attend dance training while in high school.

In 1950, he was accepted to George Balanchine's School of American Ballet where Black students were uncommon. Of his time in the school, Johnson later recalled,

"I had started out at the beginning and worked my way up the class levels and I was in advanced classes with Jacques d’Amboise, Eddie Villella, Melissa Hayden, Andre Eglevsky, Tanaquil LeClercq, Maria Tallchief. They were my peers at the time [...] It was a learning experience like no other.”

== Career ==
Although he was not hired as a full member of the New York City Ballet, Johnson was a guest artist and premiered a role in Jerome Robbins' Ballade (1952) in a cast that included Tanaquil Leclercq and Nora Kaye. He performed in Broadway shows including Four Saints in Three Acts (1952), My Darlin' Aida (1952), House of Flowers (1955) (choreographer: George Balanchine), Damn Yankees (1955 (choreographer: Bob Fosse), and Hallelujah Baby (1967).

Johnson choreographed the ballet Lament for the New York City Ballet Club in 1953. Two of his choreographic works were filmed in 1959 and can be seen here: "Two" by Louis Johnson. He created many more works for companies including the Dance Theatre of Harlem, Alvin Ailey American Dance Theater, Cincinnati Ballet, Joffrey Ballet, and Philadanco. One of Johnson's most famous works is Forces of Rhythm (1972). When he was choreographing this work for the Dance Theatre of Harlem, cast member Virginia Johnson recalled, "he didn’t want you to parrot what he was doing. He wanted you to be painting inside the lines in the most beautiful colors that you could imagine.” He created the choreography for the Broadway shows: Purlie (1970) -- for which he was nominated for a Tony Award, Lost in the Stars (1972), and Treemonisha (1975). He was the choreographer for the films: Cotton Comes to Harlem (1970), The Wiz (1978), Tales of Erotica (1996), and Baby of the Family (2002).

Continuing his genre-crossing career, Johnson was a choreographer for the Metropolitan Opera for productions including La Giaconda and Aida—starring Leontyne Price. As an educator, he directed the dance department of Henry Street Settlement in New York City from 1980 to 2003. He started Howard University’s Dance Department in Washington, D.C., and taught the first Black theatre course at Yale University.

== Personal life and awards ==
Johnson’s honors include the Pioneer Award from the Kennedy Center, recognition from The International Association of Blacks in Dance and the California chapter of the NAACP for his work with the original Negro Ensemble Company.

Johnson died from pneumonia and kidney failure on March 31, 2020, at the age of 90 in Manhattan, New York.
