= The International Association of Blacks in Dance =

The International Association of Blacks in Dance (IABD) is a non-profit organization that presents, preserves, and promotes dance by people of African-American and/or African ancestry or origin. IABD hosts an annual conference that attracts dancers, choreographers, dance scholars, dance studio owners, agents and managers, grantmakers, dance merchandise retailers, and other dance supporters from all across the world. Since its inception, IABD has received significant support from the Ford Foundation, Mellon Foundation, and MacKenzie Scott. The 3,500-member organization is the recipient of the 2021 National Medal of Arts.

== History ==
Originally conceived in 1988, the organization got its start when Joan Myers Brown hosted an "International Conference on Black Dance Companies" in Philadelphia. The conference was the direct result of a five thousand dollar grant from The Pew Charitable Trusts and additional support from the City of Philadelphia, Coalition of African American Cultural Organizations, Entertainment Business Services, Pennsylvania Council on the Arts, and University of the Arts.

Attendees of the first IABD conference included: Jeraldyne Blunden, Dayton Contemporary Dance Company, Dayton, OH; Joan Myers Brown, PHILADANCO! The Philadelphia Dance Company, Philadelphia, PA; Denise Jefferson, Alvin Ailey American Dance Theater, New York, NY; Louis Johnson; Cleo Parker Robinson, Cleo Parker Robinson Dance Ensemble, Denver, CO; Lula Washington, Lula Washington Dance Theatre, Los Angeles, CA; and Ann Williams, Dallas Black Dance Theatre, Dallas, TX.

Since that first conference, the IABD annual conference has grown to a multi-day event that attracts hundreds of professional dancers, choreographers, dance scholars, entertainment agents and managers, dance company administrators and volunteers, grantmakers, dance studio owners, academic researchers, dance merchandisers, dance students, and dance supporters.

In addition to the annual conference, IABD operates as an intermediary grantmaker, making gifts to Black dance companies; provides a forum for scholarly discussions and publications that center on dance, Blacks in dance, and other dance topics; hosts dance combine auditions for multiple dance companies; offers regular workshops, training, special events, and other programs for IABD members and the general public with the overall organizational goal to enrich the dance culture of America.

In 1993, Bonnie Bing was appointed as IABD's first executive director with responsibility of day-to-day operations.

At its 1996 annual conference, IABD became the first organization in the United States to hold an open combine audition for dancers where they could perform for a variety of artistic directors and choreographers from different dance companies.

In 1999, Sherrill Berryman Johnson (1947–2010), a dance professor at Howard University, was named IABD's second executive director, and moved the organization's administrative offices to a building on Howard's campus.

In 2000, IABD was recognized with a special citation “Bessie Award” for its service to the field of dance.

In 2011, IABD was incorporated as a nonprofit organization.

In 2017, Denise Saunders Thompson was promoted to IABD's first president and chief executive officer. She had previously served as IABD's third executive director from 2010 to 2017, and would serve as IABD president until 2023.

Beginning in 2017, IABD, in collaboration with the Nonprofit Finance Fund, developed the Comprehensive Organization Health Initiative (COHI | MOVE) to provide financial, technical, and wellness support to thirty dance organizations. The COHI|MOVE program was expanded by the launch of IABD's “Building Up: Integrated Learning and Development (BUILD)” program and now offers resources to an additional twenty-five dance companies.

In 2020, IABD published “The Black Report,” an analysis and assessment of several Black dance companies in the United States.

In 2023, IABD received the 2021 National Medal of Arts from President Joseph Biden.

In 2024, IABD counts nearly 3,500 members located across the world. The organizations operates on $1.75 million annual budget, and is managed by co-executive directors Omar Ingram and Natasha R. Moreland-Spears.

== Funders ==
The Mellon Foundation has donated more than eleven million dollars to IABD. In 2024, the Mellon Foundation awarded IABD a three-year, six million dollar grant to create a regranting program for Black dance artists and arts organizations. In 2021, the Mellon Foundation provided a $3,138,500 grant for second round funding of IABD's organizational health initiative; in 2018, IABD received first round funding of $2,636,000 from the Mellon Foundation. In 2017, the Mellon Foundation's five hundred thousand dollar grant helped to establish and develop IABD's operational infrastructure and to conduct an organizational health study of the Black Dance sector and some of the leading Black dance companies.

In 2021, IABD received three million dollars from MacKenzie Scott and Dan Jewett as part of their commitment to arts and cultural institutions that have been historically underfunded and under-recognized.

In addition, IABD has received support from the Doris Duke Charitable Foundation, Ford Foundation, Howard Gilman Foundation, Harkness Foundation for Dance, the National Endowment for the Arts, and others.

== Annual Conference ==
IABD's annual conference is the organization's signature event, and through the years, dance legends Carmen de Lavallade, Katherine Dunham, Donald McKayle, Eleo Pomare, Alvin Ailey (posthumously) and Arthur Mitchell, Debbie Allen, Janet Collins, George Faison, Gregory Hines, Maurice Hines, Judith Jamison, Paula Kelly, The Nicholas Brothers, Jaime Rogers, and Lester Wilson have been honored at the event. As well, the IABD conference provides a launchpad for emerging Black dance artists. Camille A. Brown, Rennie Harris, Christopher Huggins and others have credited the IABD with advancing their careers.

=== Conference Timeline ===
Iteration (Year)	Conference Theme	Host Company	Host city
35th (2025)	The Bridges We Build: From Revolution to Legacy	The International Association of Blacks in Dance in partnership with Hill Dance Academy Theatre	Pittsburgh, PA
34th (2024)	Can't Turn You Loose: A Love Letter to Black Dance	The International Association of Blacks in Dance in partnership with Collage Dance Collective	Memphis, TN
33rd (2023)	Globally Connected: What Does Our Tomorrow Hold?	The International Association of Blacks in Dance in partnership with dance Immersion	Toronto, Canada
32nd (2020)	THEN NOW NEXT	The International Association of Blacks in Dance in partnership with Philadanco!	Philadelphia, PA
31st (2019)	Etched In Stone: Resilient Through Time	The International Association of Blacks in Dance in partnership with Dayton Contemporary Dance Company	Dayton, OH
30th (2018)		Lula Washington Dance Theatre	Los Angeles, CA
29th (2017)		Dallas Black Dance Theater	Dallas, TX
28th (2016)		Cleo Parker Robinson Dance	Denver, CO
27th (2015)	One Tree, Many Branches	Cleveland Dance Movement	Cleveland, OH
26th (2014)		Dallas Black Dance Theater	Dallas, TX
25th (2013)		Baltimore Dance Tech, DC Youth Ensemble, Howard University, Images of Cultural Artistry	Washington, DC
24th (2012)		dance Immersion	Toronto, Canada
23rd (2011)		Lula Washington Dance Theatre	Los Angeles, CA
22nd (2010)	Back to Basics: Strengthening our Institutions for a New Generation	Philadanco!	Philadelphia, PA
21st (2009)		Cleo Parker Robinson Dance	Denver, CO
20th (2008)		Dallas Black Dance Theater	Dallas, TX
19th (2007)		dance Immersion	Toronto, Canada
18th (2006)		Ronald K. Brown/Evidence, A Dance Company	New York, NY
17th (2005)		Lula Washington Dance Theatre	Los Angeles, CA
16th (2004)		Images of Cultural Artistry, Howard University	Washington, DC
15th (2003)		Images of Cultural Artistry, Howard University	Washington, DC
-- (2002)	Bare Bones Meeting: Getting Down to the Nitty Gritty	Ronald K. Brown/Evidence, A Dance Company	Brooklyn, NY
14th (2001)		Foster King Dance Collective	San Diego, CA
13th (2000)		Dallas Black Dance Theater	Dallas, TX
12th (1999)		Cleo Parker Robi nson Dance	Denver, CO
11th (1998)		African American Dance Ensemble	Durham, NC
10th (1997)		Dallas Black Dance Theater	Dallas, TX
9th (1996)		Dayton Contemporary Dance Company	Dayton, OH
8th (1995)		Philadanco! The Philadelphia Dance Company	Philadelphia, PA
7th (1994)		DC Youth Ensemble	Washington, DC
6th (1993)		Dallas Black Dance Theater	Dallas, TX
5th (1992)		Lula Washington Dance Theatre	Los Angeles, CA
4th (1991)		Dayton Contemporary Dance Company	Dayton, OH
3rd (1990)		Cleo Parker Robinson Dance	Denver, CO
2nd (1989)		Philadanco! The Philadelphia Dance Company	Philadelphia, PA
1st (1988)	Inaugural Session	Philadanco! The Philadelphia Dance Company	Philadelphia, PA
