= Ballet East Dance Company =

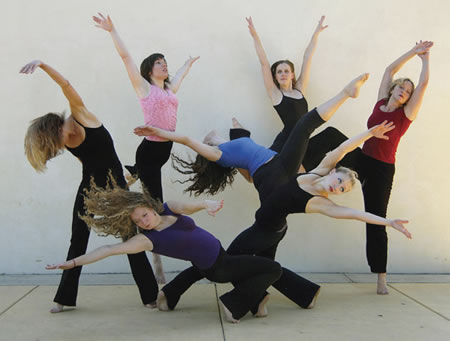
High school students participate in the Ballet East Dance Company's after school program.

The Ballet East Dance Company (BEDC) is an American modern dance company located in Austin, Texas. Founded by Rodolfo Mendez in 1978, the company presents at least eight staged productions during an annual season. The company often works with nationally recognized choreographers in addition to working with local talent. The BEDC was recently profiled in the National Endowment for the Arts's journal in 2009.

From its inception, the Ballet East Dance Company has had a strong mission statement to promote the arts within the low-income neighborhood of East Austin. To this end the company has developed a number of different community outreach programs and has had a strong commitment to hiring and mentoring local talent. The BEDC offers internships for youth in stagecraft, coordinates an annual folk and traditional arts festival in Austin, and runs an after school dance program, "Dare to Dance", for at-risk students between the ages of 7 and 15 year olds. The company also runs a program sponsored by the NEA which enables public school student to attend productions, not only by the BEDS but also Ballet Austin and Tapestry Dance Company, for free. These field trips also provide students with the opportunity to meet and talk with performers and choreographers.

BEDC also runs a dance academy, the BEDC Arts Academy, where company choreographers and dancers provide classes to the public. The school also occasionally brings in professional artists from outside of Austin to teach masterclasses both to the BEDC company members and Academy students. Recent guest teachers include Regina Larkin, artistic director of the Joyce Trisler Danscompany in New York City, and Francisco Gella, a choreographer with Philadanco in Philadelphia.
