= Dallas Black Dance Theatre =

American dance company

General information
- Year founded: 1976; 50 years ago
- Founding artistic director: Ann Williams
- Location: 2700 Flora Street, Dallas, TX
- Principal venue: Dee and Charles Wyly Theatre
- Website: dbdt.com

Senior staff
- Executive director: Zenetta Drew

Other
- Official school: Dallas Black Dance Academy

Dallas Black Dance Theatre (DBDT) is the oldest continuously operating dance company in Dallas, Texas. For nearly half a century, DBDT has performed across the United States and around the world. In 2024, Dallas voters approved a $1.25 billion bond measure that includes an allocation of more than three million dollars to DBDT for the renovation and upgrade of their building in the Dallas Arts District.

== History ==
Dallas Black Dance Theatre (DBDT) was founded by Ann Williams in 1976. Originally located on the campus of Bishop College, DBDT received a 1988 gift from Lucy Crow Billingsley for access to a 13,000 square-foot building on Flora Street in Dallas. The company has grown through the years to include two, professional modern dance companies (DBDT and DBDT: Encore!, established in 2000) and a dance school with three student ensembles.

DBDT is a member of The International Association of Blacks in Dance (IABD). In 1993, 1997, 2000, 2008, 2014, and 2017, DBDT hosted the IABD annual conference. In 2024, DBDT received a three-year grant from the Mellon Foundation to support institutional capacity building.

In May 2024, DBDT company dancers voted to join the American Guild of Musical Artists (AGMA), a labor union. In August 2024, DBDT terminated the employment contract for its main company dancers. To protest the terminations, supporters of the fired DBDT dancers marched outside of DBDT’s building. On August 12, 2024, AGMA issued a Do Not Work Order for DBDT. On October 29, 2024, DBDT leadership met with AGMA representatives to discuss settling the employment issues pending against them before the National Labor Relations Board (NLRB) and reinstating the terminated dancers. In November 2024, NLRB filed a formal complaint against DBDT. On December 8, 2024, DBDT announced a settlement with the AGMA and approved by NLRB. The fired DBDT dancers: Gillian Clifford, Micah Isaiah, Sierra Jones, Elijah Lancaster, Dominiq Luckie, Derick McKoy, Jr., Terrell Rogers, Nile Ruff, Brianne Sellars, and Sean J. Smith, and the three dancers who were not offered employment for the 2024-2025 season, will receive more than $560,000 in back pay, front pay, and damages from DBDT. As part of the settlement, DBDT must send apology letters to the affected dancers, publish a multi-page notice explaining DBDT current employees’ rights, and work with NLRB employment training representatives to ensure that DBDT is compliant with the AGMA settlement and NLRB agreement. On December 11, 2024, the Dallas City Council voted 11-4 to cut $248,335 in city funding that was recommended for DBDT, and to redistribute that money to other arts organizations in Dallas.

=== Dallas Black Dance Academy ===
DBDT's official school, Dallas Black Dance Academy, was founded in 1973. The academy is the only modern dance company of color in the nation certified to teach the American Ballet Theatre (ABT) National Training Curriculum. The school features three performing ensembles: Allegro Performing Ensemble, Junior Performing Ensemble, and Senior Performing Ensemble.

Academy alumni include: actress Liz Mikel, writer and producer Wendy Calhoun, and dancers who have had careers with Boston Ballet, DBDT, Hofesh Shechter, Hubbard Street Dance, and New York City Ballet.

=== DBDT Building ===
DBDT’s dance studios, school, meeting spaces, and administrative offices are located at 2700 Flora Street, Dallas, a 32,000 square foot building that housed the former Moorland YMCA, which DBDT acquired in 1999. In 2002, DBDT launched a capital campaign that raised $10.8 million to purchase and renovate the building. In 2003, a City of Dallas-approved bond referendum awarded more than three million dollars to DBDT for “the planning, design, construction and renovation of the former Moorland YMCA building as a multi-use dance rehearsal, instructional and administrative office facility."

In 2005, DBDT donated its building to the City of Dallas, the city's first-owned facility for dance. In exchange for its gift to the city, DBDT received a forty-year building lease with an annual base rent of ten dollars. In addition, DBDT receives an annual allocation of $170,000 for maintenance and management of a city-owned facility.

In 2014, the 2700 block of Flora Street was renamed "Ann Williams Way" in honor of DBDT’s founder and artistic director’s career.

In 2017, DBDT completed a capital campaign that raised $2.2 million in matching funds that the City of Dallas reimbursed per a 2018 agreement for the planning, design, construction and renovation of the building. In 2020, DBDT finished a major building renovation project, including waterproofing and restoring exterior doors, windows, and facade, that was funded by a Dallas voter-approved 2017 Bond Program. In 2024, the City of Dallas voters approved “Proposition E,” a $1.25 billion capital bond program that includes support for Dallas’ cultural and performing arts facilities. Beginning in 2026, DBDT will receive $3,127,850 for improvements to its building's elevator, security and HVAC systems, as well as flooring and roof replacements.

== Performances and tours ==
DBDT has performed for diverse audiences across the United States and around the world, including the following venues and events.

- 1986: Deep Ellum Blues, Majestic Theatre, Dallas. DBDT’s first major production; lead sponsor: JC Penney.
- 1991: Lima, Peru, sponsored by SAGA Foundation
- 1991: Arts Festival, Italy
- 1992: Expo ’92, USA Pavilion, Seville, Spain
- 1996: Cultural Olympiad, Atlanta, Georgia, the first Texas arts organization to perform at an Olympic arts festival.
- 1996: Lincoln Center Out-of-Doors Festival
- 1997: Dance Women/Living Legends, New York City
- 1998: South Africa
- 1998: Gershwin Centennial, Kennedy Center
- 2000: Harare International Festival of the Arts, Zimbabwe
- 2001: Texas A&M University-Commerce, Commerce, TX
- 2004: Lincoln Center Out-of-Doors Festival, New York
- 2005: Masters of African-American Choreography, Kennedy Center, Washington, DC
- 2006: Commissioning collaboration with Dallas Symphony Orchestra
- 2008: Nasher Sculpture Center, George Segal Seascapes Exhibit, Dallas
- 2012: Ailey Citigroup Theater, New York
- 2012: Olympic Preview Performance, Bryan Park, New York
- 2012: Cultural Olympiad, Edinburgh, Scotland, as part of the 2012 Olympic Games
- 2015: Dance X BZ Festival, Belize
- 2016: Masterworks Redefined, Ailey Citigroup Theater, New York
- 2021: Jacob’s Pillow, Becket, MA
- 2022: University Theatre, Yale, New Haven, CT
- 2023: Aronoff Center for the Arts Jarson-Kaplan Theater, Cincinnati, OH.

=== Repertoire ===
DBDT performs a mixed repertory of modern, ballet, jazz, and ethnic work by nationally and internationally known choreographers, including the following selections.

- ...And Now Marvin (1994). Choreography: Darryl B. Sneed.
- Absolute Rule (1992). Choreography: Elisa Monte and David Brown.
- Above & Below (2016). Choreography: Nycole Ray
- A Precious Stone (2018). Choreography: Claude Alexander III and Sean J. Smith
- A Rag, A Bone, and a Hank of Hair (1991). Choreography: Talley Beatty
- A Tender Pardon (2019). Choreography: Claude Alexander III
- Awassa Astrige/Ostrich (1932). Choreography: Asadata Dafora
- Beams from Heaven (2010). Choreography: Christopher L. Huggins
- Bodies as Site of Faith and Protest (2016). Choreography: Tommie-Waheed Evans
- Bounce (2017). Choreography: Stephen Mills
- Boundless Journey. Choreography: Dianne McIntyre
- Displaced, Yet Rebirth (2018). Choreography: Michelle N. Gibson
- Escapades. Choreography: Alvin Ailey
- Essence (2005). Choreography: Christopher L. Huggins
- Etudes and Elegy. Choreography: Gene Hill Sagan
- Execution of a Sentiment (2019). Choreography: Darrell Grand Moultrie
- Face what's facing you! (2018). Choreography: Claude Alexander III
- From Within (2019). Choreography: Nijawwon Matthews
- Furtherance (2016). Choreography: Kirven Douthit-Boyd
- Games (1951). Choreography: Donald McKayle
- How to Kill a Ghost (2014). Choreography: Juel D. Lane
- I AM LARGE (2020). Choreography: Joshua L. Peugh
- Inside the Absence of Fear. Choreography: Ray Mercer
- Instinct 11.1. Choreography: Francesca Harper
- in•ter•pret (2005). Choreography: Hope Boykin. Music: Tchaikovsky
- Interpretations (2017). Choreography: Sean J. Smith
- In The Sea of Heaven (2018). Choreography: Takehiro Ueyama
- LIKE WATER. Choreography: Darrell Grand Moultrie
- Memoirs. Choreography: Garfield Lemonius
- Night Run (2003). Choreography: Christopher Huggins.
- ODETTA (2014). Choreography: Matthew Rushing]
- ON.Toward.Press. (2020). Choreography: Hope Boykin
- Porgy and Bess (1998). Choreography: Hope Clarke
- RED. Choreography: Bruce Wood. Music: Philip Glass.
- Reflections in D (1962). Choreography: Alvin Ailey Music: Duke Ellington
- Rite of Passage (2024). Choreography: Zach Law Ingram
- Shatter (2023). Choreography: Gregory Dolbashian in collaboration with the dancers of DBDT
- Sinatra Suite (1983). Choreography: Twyla Tharp. Music: Frank Sinatra.
- Smoke. Choreography: Bruce Wood
- Southern Recollections (2012). Choreography: Bridget Moore.
- Swipe Left (2023). Choreography: Sean J. Smith in collaboration with Bianca Melidor
- The B-Side (2016). Choreography: Tiffany Rea-Fisherz
- The Edge of My Life...So Far. Choreography: Bruce Wood
- This Time (2018). Choreography: Joy Bollinger
- Tribute (2016). Choreography: Matthew Rushing
- Undeviated Passage (2018). Choreography: Ray Mercer
- Vespers (1986). Choreography: Ulysses Dove
- What to Say? Notes on Echo and Narcissus (2015). Choreography: Jamal Story

== Leadership ==
=== Artistic Directors ===
- Ann Williams (1976–2014)
- April Berry (2014–2015)
- Bridget L. Moore (2016–2017)
- Melissa Young (2018–2024)
- Richard Freeman, interim (2024-)

=== DBDT: Encore! (or DBDT II) directors ===
- Nycole Ray, artistic director, DBDT: Encore! (2012-)

=== Dallas Black Dance Academy directors ===
- Katricia Eaglin, academy director

=== Administration ===
- Gilbert Gerst, chairman, board of directors
- Georgia Scaife, president, board of directors (2007 - )
- Kristie Patton Foster, executive director (2026 - )
- Stephanie Hawthorne, managing director

== Dancers ==
- DaJuan Foley, Jr. (2024-)
- Jayla Johnson (2024-)
- Amit Katz (2024-)
- Jazmun McCoy (2024-)
- Quintin Moore (2024-)
- Jemari Neal (2024-)
- Brandon Palmer (2024-)
- Anna Rotllant-Estelrich (2024-)
- Javares Selby (2024-)
- Anna Vazquez (2024-)
- Sarah Westbrook (2024-)

== Former dancers ==
The following is a partial list of former dancers with DBDT.

=== Company ===
- Claude Alexander III (2010-)
- Janine N. Beckles (2005-2010)
- Jasmine Black
- Destinee Bouldin (2024)
- Carmen Cage (2021-)
- Gillian Clifford (2023-2024)
- Maria Day (2006-)
- Hana Delong (2015-)
- Ally DesJardins (2024)
- Katricia Eaglin (2005–2015)
- Kayah Franklin
- Richard A. Freeman Jr. (2005-)
- Andre R. George (1994)
- Edmond Giles
- William Gill
- Alyssa Harrington
- Michelle Hebert
- Diana Herrera
- Micah Isaiah (-2024)
- Cynthia Jackson
- Kevin E. Jackson (2004-)
- Michael Jackson, Jr. (2006-)
- Rashan K. Jackson (2005-)
- Sierra Noelle Jones (2017-2024)
- Elijah Lancaster (2022-2024)
- Garfield Lemonius
- Dominiq Luckie (-2024)
- Alicia Lundgren (2007-)
- Xavier Mack (2017-)
- Derick McKoy, Jr. (2022-2024)
- Bianca Melidor (2021-2024)
- Amber Merrick
- Keon K. Nickie (2014-2017)
- Carly Olson (2024)
- Omoniyi Osoba Obioha
- Daniel Palladino (2022-)
- Charles Michael Patterson (2018-)
- Alicia Pegues (2004-)
- Jessica Popoff (2021-)
- Nycole Ray (1998-)
- Terrell Rogers Jr. (2021-2024)
- Tyrell V. Rolle
- Nile Ruff ( -2024)
- Brianne Sellars (2023-2024)
- Micah Sherard (-2024)
- Derrick Smith
- Sean J. Smith (2010–2024)
- Darryl B. Sneed (-1997)
- Jamal Story
- Milton T. Tatum, Jr.
- Jamie Thompson
- De’Anthony Vaughan (2014-)
- Nicholas Villeneuve
- Isabel Wallace-Green (2021-)
- Jasmine White-Killins
- McKinley Willis (2015-)
- Kimara Wood
- Melissa Young (1994–2005)
- Michele Zada

=== DBDT: Encore! (or DBDT II) ===
- Darian Brogdon
- Ketreon Butler
- Gillian Clifford (2022-2023)
- Molly Davison
- Katricia Eaglin (2000)
- Jayla Johnson (2023)
- Rayshard Demarco Keys
- Aleigha Mayo
- Olivia McCall
- Jazmun McCoy (2023)
- Brandon Palmer (2022-2023)
- Jeron Sanders
- Javares Selby (2022-2023)
- Brianne Sellars
- Micah Sherard
- Sarah Westbrook (2023)
- Markel Antonio Williams

== Awards and honors ==
- 2023—Best of Leadership Award, Dance Data Project’s Gender Equity Index, an index that measures a ballet or dance company’s commissioning of female creators, promoting women to leadership positions, and fostering a transparent and accountable culture as determined by a Dance Data Project survey.
- 2017—Texas Medal of Arts Award, Arts Education from the Texas Cultural Trust
- 2008—American Masterpiece Touring Artist, National Endowment for the Arts
- 2008—Best Dallas Dance Company, Dallas Observer
