= Boylan-Haven-Mather Academy =

Location
- Coordinates: 34.2461678°N 80.6133641°W

Information
- Former name: Boylan School; Haven Industrial Home and School; Boylan-Haven School; Mather Academy
- Type: Private, boarding
- Closed: 1983
- Campus size: 27 acres (11 ha)
- Last updated: 30 December 2017

Boylan-Haven-Mather Academy, more familiarly known as “Mather Academy,” was a private African American boarding school in Camden, South Carolina. Its name reflects four schools founded and merged in South Carolina, Georgia and Florida by the Women's Home Missionary Society of the Methodist Episcopal Church to educate former slaves and their descendants. Boylan-Haven-Mather Academy closed in 1983. Among its graduates/students were U.S. Congressman James E. Clyburn (D-SC), major league baseball pioneer Larry Doby, businessman E. Perry Palmer, childcare advocate Frieda Mitchell, "Dean of the CIAA" coach Eddie C. McGirt, and civil rights attorney John Roy Harper II.

== History ==
=== Boylan School ===
Founded in 1886 in Jacksonville, Florida, the school was named for a benefactor, Ann Boylan DeGroot, treasurer of the Newark Conference. She'd hoped to atone for, and change the image of, her family, which had operated two large plantations. In 1901, the school established a nurse training department, which later became Brewster Hospital – the first for African Americans in Jacksonville.

=== Haven Industrial Home and School ===
Founded in 1885 in Savannah, Georgia, the school was named for Bishop Gilbert Haven, based on an earlier school founded by Mrs. S.M. Lewis and Mrs. M.C. Bristol of the Atlanta Mission. It lasted until 1932, when its isolated location, low student enrollment and poor facilities resulted in a merger with the Boylan School.

=== Boylan-Haven School ===
Created in 1932 in Jacksonville, this was the merger of the Boylan and Haven schools.

=== Mather Academy ===
Founded in 1887 in Camden, this was the brainchild of Sarah Babcock, a Plymouth, Massachusetts teacher who'd opened a short-lived Freedmen's Bureau school in 1867 before purchasing the 27-acre Thomas Lang plantation. When she became corresponding secretary of the New England Southern Conference, she urged the group to establish a girls' school on the property. The school was named Browning Model Home and Industrial School in honor of benefactor Fanny O. Browning. In 1890, it enrolled its first male students, and the Conference purchased the land from Babcock, who'd married Rev. James Mather. In 1900, at Babcock Mather's request, Browning Home was renamed Mather Academy in honor of her husband.

Mather Academy expanded its curriculum over the years, offering grade levels from kindergarten through high school, and accepting applicants from across the nation. In 1928, it was one of the first S.C. schools for African Americans to offer a 12th grade. In 1934, Mather's high quality of education earned it a Class A school rating—a distinction held at the time by only three other schools in the state.

The combination of black students co-existing peaceably and equally with white teachers and administrators during segregation made Mather an "oasis" of race relations. A gymnasium and auditorium in the administration building/girls' dormitory were the preferred sites in the region for many sporting events, concerts, pageants and plays. The Christmas Pageant attracted a large cross-section of the Camden community.

=== Boylan-Haven-Mather Academy ===
In 1959, the Women's Division of Christian Service of the Methodist Board of Missions closed the Boylan-Haven School in Florida and merged it with Mather Academy in Camden to economize finances.

In 1983, the Methodist Women's Division, part of the General Board of Global Ministries, closed Boylan-Haven-Mather Academy because of the Board's new mission priorities, rising costs, and the school's declining enrollment brought on by factors such as integration and increased educational opportunities in the public sector. The Women's Division ordered the buildings torn down in 1995 and began selling the land. A memorial site and historical marker in Camden identify the school's former location.

== Notable alumni ==
- Gloria Blackwell, former African-American civil rights activist and educator
- James E. Clyburn, politician of the Democratic Party and member of the United States House of Representatives.
- Larry Doby, professional baseball player in the Negro leagues and Major League Baseball (MLB). He was the second black player to break baseball's color barrier
- Eddie C. McGirt, former football and basketball coach at Johnson C. Smith University. CIAA hall of fame member.
- Josephine Dibble Murphy, former educator and activist
- John Roy Harper II, attorney and activist

== Alumni Association ==
The Boylan-Haven-Mather Academy (BHMA) National Alumni Association organized in 1987.
