= Gallimaufry Performing Arts =

- Gallimaufry Logo

Background information
- Origin: Laguna Beach, CA (2002)
- Genres: Musical Theatre, Plays, Choir, Dance

Gallimaufry Performing Arts is a theater and dance company founded in 2004 in Laguna Beach, California by Steve Josephson, the current Executive Artistic Director.

== Theatre ==
Gallimaufry was founded in 2004 by Steve Josephson. Since its inception, the company has produced 13 fully staged musicals, 5 plays, 11 dance events, 14 musical concerts and many other special events.

=== Scared Money ===
In April 2009, Gallimaufry presented the world premiere of a new play called Scared Money. The play was written by Sherwood Kiraly. Sherwood recently wrote the screenplay for the film Diminished Capacity, which starred Matthew Broderick and Alan Alda. His new play is a comedy about six people searching for hidden Santa Anita Pick Six Racetrack ticket worth $714,000. The title derives from an old saying "Scared money never wins", meaning that you shouldn't gamble money you're afraid to lose.

== Dance ==
=== Dance Days ===
Dance days consist of free master classes followed by a free performance on Laguna's "Main Beach". Past master classes have ranged from rhythm tap, modern and hip-hop to Afro-Caribbean, Indian and Latin Jazz. Past dance day performances have included the inspirational and explosive Lula Washington Dance Theatre , Erin Landry, the "spirited grace" of Backhaus Dance , the "b-boying, poppin', lockin'" of JabbaWockeeZ, who became the first winners on the MTV series America's Best Dance Crew, the "choreographic intricacy and artistry" of Sean Greene, the premiere of Karama Adesco's ALIVE Contemporary Dance Company, San Francisco's "lively and sensuous" Company Chaddick , the contemporary drumming sounds of TAIKOPROJECT , the comic genius of Dudley Brooks' comedy dance troupe "Run for Your life" from San Francisco , the beguiling the evocative Indian choreography of Ramaa Bharadvaj & The Angahara Ensemble which also included a Tahitian ensemble .

=== Gallimaufry & Greene ===
Gallimaufry & Greene is the brainchild of Executive Artistic Director, Steve Josephson. Josephson, the creator of the company's "Dance Days" and "Songs in the Sand" series, as well as the executive director of the inaugural caDance Festival, has built this new company around famed dancer and choreographer, Sean Greene. The new contemporary dance company received its world premiere on April 18, 2007, as part of Gallimaufry's Arts Festival. The company has performed "The Rite to Fall", "Angels" and "A Night at the Movies", which they also took overseas to the Edinburgh Fringe Festival.

=== Jump Rhythm Jazz Project ===
In April 2008, Gallimaufry presented Jump Rhythm Jazz Project, the Emmy Award-winning dance company from Chicago. The group is made up of rhythmically explosive dancer-singer-actors that celebrate jazz. It was founded in 1990 by Billy Siegenfeld, who continues to choreograph for the company and perform as an ensemble member. He received a 2006-2007 Emmy Award in the category of Outstanding Achievement for Individual Excellence On Camera/Performer for his work in the multiple-Emmy Award-winning documentary Jump Rhythm Jazz Project: Getting There.

=== Pericles Redux ===
In October 2008, Gallimaufry brought a dance troupe straight from the Edinburgh Fringe Festival to perform on Main Beach. The troupe is called the 'Not Man Apart' Physical Theatre Ensemble, and the show was called Pericles Redux , a reconstruction of Shakespeare's romantic odyssey. The show pushed the boundaries between theatre and dance, and was met with rave reviews, both in Edinburgh and Laguna Beach.

== Music ==
=== Ridiculous Medley ===
Created in 2006, The Ridiculous Medley is a new vocal performance group that performs for special events, community functions, parties, fundraisers and corporate events. Under the direction of Meredith Woodson-Hubbard, the Ridiculous Medley has already performed for the CHOC Queen of Hearts Guild fundraiser as well as several community events.

=== Lagunatunes ===
Gallimaufry was affiliated with the Laguna Beach community choir called "Lagunatunes". The choir performs two concerts a year, one during the holiday season and one in early spring. These concerts are performed at the Artists' Theatre.

== Arts Projects ==
Gallimaufry is part of the Laguna Beach Alliance for the Arts.

=== The Generation GAP ===
The Generation GAP is a self-producing teen theatre company. The group focuses on learning all aspects of theatre, including producing, directing, performing, designing, managing, project managing and fundraising. Teens ages 12–18 plan, raise money, produce, design, cast, direct and perform in shows, and in the process learn all the ins and outs of how to run a theatre company. Generation GAP's most recent production was the musical "Little Women."

=== Edinburgh Fringe Festival ===
The poster for "Harlem Renaissance", which Gallimaufry took overseas to the Edinburgh Fringe Festival

In the summer of 2007, Gallimaufry Performing Arts took two shows overseas to the Edinburgh Fringe Festival, the world's largest art's festival. Both shows performed in the renowned C venues. The group revived their production of Sordid Lives and a revamped version of Harlem Renaissance. Jonelle Allen received rave reviews for her performance as Florence Mills and the show was chosen as a "Pick of the Fringe" by The Gilded Balloon.
In 2008, the dance troupe Gallimaufry and Greene performed their show, "A Night at the Movies", at the Fringe.

=== Laguna Beach New Play Festival ===
In 2008, Gallimaufry joined with the Orange County Playwrights' Alliance to conduct a playwright competition. They found both full-length and one-act plays that centered around Halloween. Eight plays were chosen and they were performed the first weekend of November at the Forum Theatre.

=== Songs in the Sand Series ===
Since 2006, Gallimaufry has been presenting concert versions of classic shows on the sands of Main Beach in Laguna. These concerts are free to the public and feature a full orchestra. The first in this series was South Pacific, followed by Carousel and Guys and Dolls. The most recent production was a series of songs from Fiddler on the Roof, My Fair Lady and Chicago.

=== The Arab, The Jew & The Chicken ===
In October 2008, Gallimaufry brought a Middle Eastern sketch comedy quartet to Laguna to perform their show. The show was entitled The Arab, The Jew & The Chicken. It was a hit at the 2008 Edinburgh Fringe Festival, and their performance in Laguna was their international debut. The show was written and performed by Arab, Israeli, Jewish and Muslim actors and it focused on conflict, identity and everyday life in the Middle East.

== Archives ==
Show	Year	Type
White Dalmatian	July 2011	American Premiere
Damn Yankees	July 2010	
Thoroughly Modern Millie	July 2009	
Bugsy Malone	July 2009	
"Holiday Harmonies"	December 2008	Lagunatunes Concert
Pericles Redux	October 2008	Dance
Laguna Beach New Play Festival	October 2008	
The Arab, The Jew & The Chicken	October 2008	Sketch Comedy Show
Broadway on the Beach	October 2008	Concert
Cabaret	July 2008	
Willy Wonka and the Chocolate Factory	July 2008	
Jump Rhythm Jazz Project	April 2008	Dance
The Glass Menagerie	April 2008	
"The Rite of Spring"/"Angels"	April 2008	Gallimaufry and Greene
Gloriously Gershwin	December 2007	Musical Revue
"Holiday Suite"	December 2007	Lagunatunes Concert
Snoopy!!! The Musical	December 2007	The Generation GAP
Guys and Dolls	September 2007	Concert
Disney's The Jungle Book	July 2007	
Classical Roots Brings Classic Jazz	March 2007	Lagunatunes Concert
Six Degrees of Separation	April 2007	Promiscuous Assemblage
"A Night at the Movies"	April 2007	Gallimaufry & Greene premiere
Harlem Renaissance: The Life of Florence Mills	April 2007	Song and Dance Concert
Hot & Cole	February 2007	Musical Revue
"Merry Tunes"	December 2006	Lagunatunes Concert
Best of Broadway III	November 2006	Musical Revue
Carousel	September 2006	Concert
Sordid Lives	September 2006	Promiscuous Assemblage
Meet Me in St. Louis	July 2006	
Once On This Island	July 2006	The Generation GAP
"Seasons of Love"	May 2006	Lagunatunes Concert
The Diary of Anne Frank	May 2006	The Generation GAP
You're a Good Man, Charlie Brown	May 2006	Classes
South Pacific	April 2006	Concert
Best of Broadway II	December 2005	Musical Revue
A Chorus Line	August 2005	
Seussical the Musical	August 2005	
"Stars of Dance"	May 2005	Dance
Weird Romance	April 2005	The Generation GAP
Duets	February 2005	Musical Revue
Best of Broadway	December 2004	Musical Revue
March of the Falsettos	November 2004	Promiscuous Assemblage
"Dancing in the Sand"	October 2004	Dance
Into the Woods Jr.	August 2004	
42nd Street	August 2004	
