= Sandra Fortune-Green =

American ballet dancer and teacher

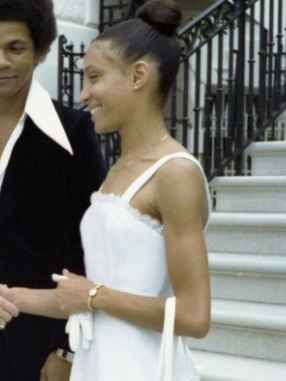
- Born: Sandra Fortune; March 2, 1951 (age 74); Washington, D.C.
- Occupation(s): Ballet dancer, teacher
- Organization(s): Jones-Haywood Dance School; Capitol Ballet Company
- Spouse: Joseph Green

Sandra Fortune-Green (born March 2, 1951) is a ballet teacher and former dancer. Fortune-Green, who is African-American, was professor of dance at Howard University for 15 years and is now owner and artistic director of the Legacy of the Jones-Haywood School, the integrated ballet school where she learned to dance as a child in the 1960s.

== Biography ==
Fortune was born March 2, 1951, in Washington, D.C., to Raymond and Elizabeth Fortune. At 10, she enrolled at the Jones-Haywood School of Ballet, a ballet school founded in 1941 by Doris W. Jones and Claire Haywood to be an integrated school to train African American students refused at white ballet schools.

Fortune graduated from Theodore Roosevelt High School in 1968 and continued dance studies in New York at the School of American Ballet, the American Ballet Theatre, and the Joffrey Ballet. Eventually she returned to Washington, D.C., and enrolled in Howard University, studying elementary education. In 1972, she left Howard to pursue her dance career internationally, and in 1973, was the only American to compete in the Second International Ballet Competition in Moscow, finishing 26th out of 125. Her partner was Clover Mathis of the Alvin Ailey Troupe, though he was not competing.

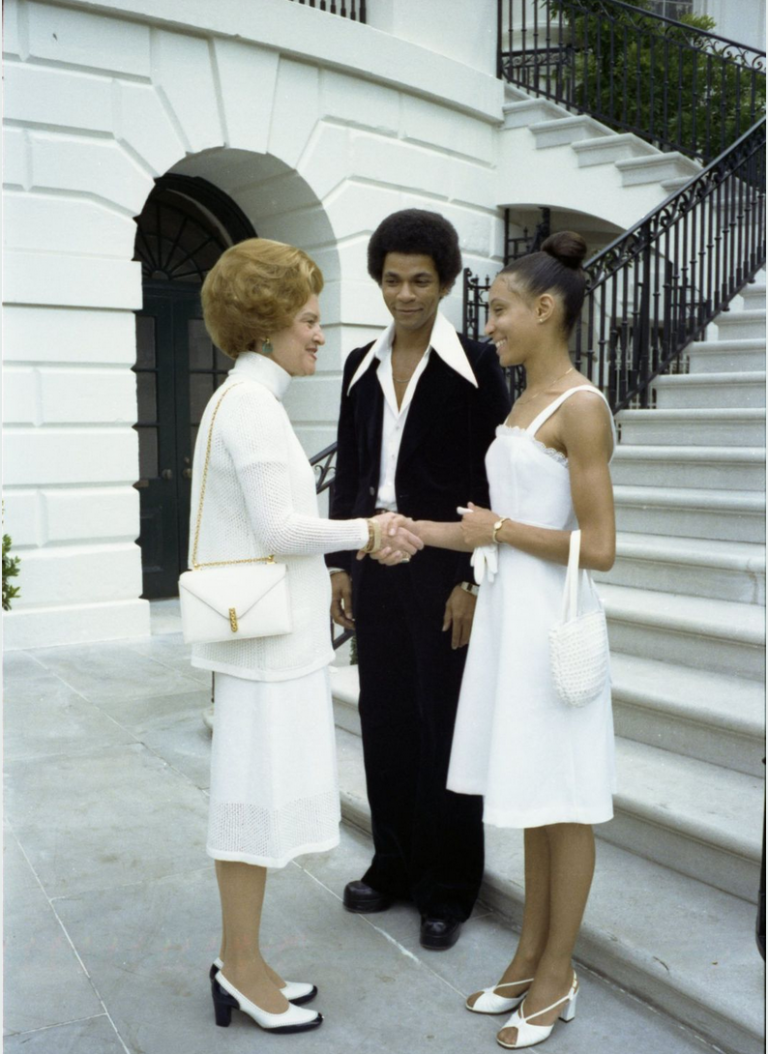
First Lady Betty Ford meets Fortune-Green and partner Sylvester Campbell at the White House in 1976

She married Joseph Green on New Year's Eve, 1975. In 1976 she was viewed as the top United States competitor at the Varna International Ballet Competition. She was invited to the White House by First Lady Betty Ford to convey Ford's well-wishes in the competition. Fortune-Green received an honorable mention at Varna.

Fortune-Green continued dancing with the Capitol Ballet, the company that served as the performing arm of the Jones-Haywood School, which became fully professionalized in 1979. She was awarded a Washington, D.C. Mayor's Arts Award for Excellence in an Artistic Discipline from Mayor Marion Barry in 1987. In 1994, she joined the faculty at Howard University's dance department, where she taught ballet technique classes for 15 years. Fortune-Green has also served on the dance faculty at the Duke Ellington School of the Arts for over thirty years.

In 2007, Fortune-Green became the owner of the Jones-Haywood School of Dance.
