= It Takes a Lunatic =

2019 documentary film

- Film poster
- Directed by: Billy Lyons (directed by); Kim Ferraro (co-director); Seth Isler (co-director)
- Starring: Alec Baldwin; André Bishop; Michael Douglas
- Production company: Exemplar Productions
- Distributed by: Netflix
- Release dates: May 3, 2019 (Tribeca); October 25, 2019
- Running time: 120 minutes
- Country: United States
- Language: English

It Takes a Lunatic is a 2019 documentary film directed by Billy Lyons, Kim Ferraro and Seth Isler and starring Alec Baldwin, André Bishop and Michael Douglas. The premise revolves around Wynn Handman, the Artistic Director of The American Place Theatre.

== Cast ==
- Alec Baldwin
- André Bishop
- Michael Douglas
- Richard Gere
- Connie Britton
- Susan Lucci
- Eric Bogosian
- Kathleen Chalfant
- John Leguizamo
- Frank Chin
- James Caan
- Chris Cooper
- Joel Grey
- Marianne Leone
- Clare Coss
- Sam Shepard

== Release ==
It Takes a Lunatic premiered at the 2019 Tribeca Film Festival, and was released on October 25, 2019, on Netflix.
