= Eddie McGirt =

American football coach (1920–1999)

Biographical details
- Born: January 31, 1920; Camden, South Carolina, U.S.
- Died: December 21, 1999 (aged 79)

Playing career

Football
- c. 1940: Johnson C. Smith
- Position: Fullback

Coaching career (HC unless noted)

Football
- 1958–1977: Johnson C. Smith

Basketball
- 1959–1962: Johnson C. Smith

Head coaching record
- Overall: 118–73–3 (football); 63–32 (basketball)

Accomplishments and honors

Championships
- Football; 1 CIAA (1969); 2 CIAA Southern Division (1970, 1972)

Eddie C. McGirt (January 31, 1920 – December 21, 1999) was an American football and basketball coach and college athletics administrator. He served as the head football coach at Johnson C. Smith University in Charlotte, North Carolina from 1958 to 1977, compiling a record of 118–73–3. McGirt was also the head basketball coach at Johnson C. Smith from 1959 to 1962, tallying a mark of 63–32.

== Early years ==
McGirt was born in Camden, South Carolina. He competed in football, basketball, and track at Mather Academy. He enrolled at Johnson C. Smith University in 1940, earning All-Central Intercollegiate Athletic Association (CIAA) honors as a fullback for the football team.

He entered the United States Army in 1943 and received a Purple Heart.

== Coaching career ==
McGirt was the football head coach at Mather Academy for several years. In 1958, he returned to Johnson C. Smith University, where he eventually became the school's 11th head football coach.

He is credited with lifting Johnson C. Smith's struggling football team to become one of the CIAA's most respected. For 20 years, his teams ranked at the top of CIAA standings. He retired after 20 years as Johnson C. Smith's head football coach. During his tenure, his teams won one CIAA championship (1969), two divisional titles, and were runners-up twice. He retired with an overall football coaching record of 118–73.

He also served many teaching positions and coached the university's basketball team from 1959 to 1962 with an overall record of 63–32.

McGirt remained as the university's athletic director and head of the Department of Health and Physical Education until June 30, 1985. He supported Johnson C. Smith athletics until his death on December 21, 1999.

In 1977, he was inducted into the Central Intercollegiate Athletic Association (CIAA) Hall of Fame. The university's football field is named after him (Eddie McGirt Field). The Eddie C. McGirt Endowed Scholarship is awarded to a sophomore, junior, or student athlete with at least a 3.0 GPA.

== Head coaching record ==
=== Football ===
Year	Team	Overall	Conference	Standing	Bowl/playoffs
Johnson C. Smith Golden Bulls (Central Intercollegiate Athletic Association) (1958–1977)
1958	Johnson C. Smith	6–2	5–2	9th	
1959	Johnson C. Smith	5–4	5–4	7th	
1960	Johnson C. Smith	6–3	6–2	7th	
1961	Johnson C. Smith	8–1	6–1	3rd	
1962	Johnson C. Smith	7–2	6–1	3rd	
1963	Johnson C. Smith	7–2	5–1	4th	
1964	Johnson C. Smith	7–2–1	6–1	4th	
1965	Johnson C. Smith	5–4	5–1	2nd	
1966	Johnson C. Smith	3–5–1	3–2–1	4th	
1967	Johnson C. Smith	6–2–1	5–0–1	3rd	
1968	Johnson C. Smith	5–4	3–3	11th	
1969	Johnson C. Smith	8–2	6–1	1st	
1970	Johnson C. Smith	8–2	6–1	1st (Southern)	
1971	Johnson C. Smith	5–4	3–2	2nd (Southern)	
1972	Johnson C. Smith	6–5	4–0	1st (Southern)	
1973	Johnson C. Smith	7–4	3–2	4th	
1974	Johnson C. Smith	4–7	4–2	4th	
1975	Johnson C. Smith	8–3	6–1	T–2nd	
1976	Johnson C. Smith	4–7	3–5	T–6th	
1977	Johnson C. Smith	3–8	2–6	T–8th	
Johnson C. Smith:		118–73–3	92–38–2		
Total:		118–73–3			
