= Wynn Handman =

American theatre director (1922–2020)

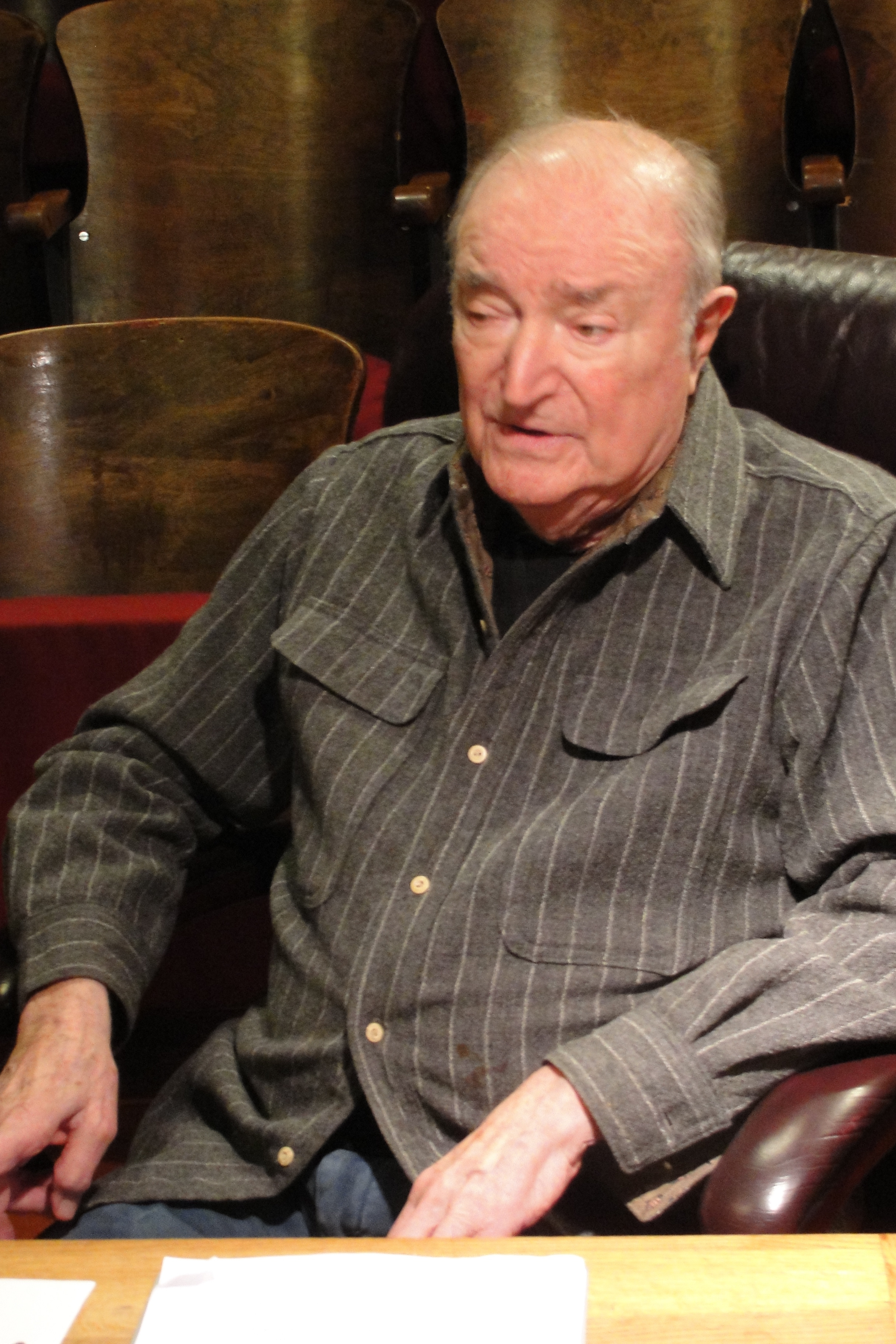
- Handman working in his studio on West 54th Street in New York
- Born: Irwin Leo Handman; May 19, 1922; New York City, U.S.
- Died: April 11, 2020 (aged 97); New York City, U.S.
- Occupations: Teacher, director, producer
- Years active: 1944–2020
- Spouse: Barbara Ann Schlein (1950-2013; her death)
- Children: 2

Wynn Handman (May 19, 1922 – April 11, 2020) was the artistic director of The American Place Theatre, which he co-founded with Sidney Lanier and Michael Tolan in 1963. His role in the theatre was to seek out, encourage, train, and present new and exciting writing and acting talent and to develop and produce new plays by living American writers. In addition, he initiated several Arts Education Programs, such as Literature to Life. His life and the history of The American Place Theatre are the subjects of the 2019 documentary It Takes a Lunatic.

Handman died during the COVID-19 pandemic due to complications brought on by COVID-19.

== Early life ==
Handman grew up in the Inwood neighborhood in Upper Manhattan. Handman studied acting at The Neighborhood Playhouse School of the Theater in New York City. In 1949 he created the role of Sentry Hallam in the world premiere of Louis O. Coxe and Robert H. Chapman's Uniform of Flesh; which later was retitled Billy Budd for its critically successful run on Broadway in 1951.

== Directing career ==
Plays he has directed at The American Place Theatre include: Manchild in the Promised Land, which he adapted from the novel by Claude Brown; I Stand Before You Naked by Joyce Carol Oates; Words, No Music by Calvin Trillin; Drinking in America by Eric Bogosian; A Girl's Guide to Chaos by Cynthia Heimel; Free Speech in America, and Bibliomania by Roger Rosenblatt, with Ron Silver; Coming Through also adapted by Handman; Spokesman written and performed by John Hockenberry; Fly by Joseph Edward; and Dreaming in Cuban and Other Works: Rhythm, Rum, Café con Leche and Nuestros Abuelos by Cristina García and Michael Garcés. Also, he has adapted and directed many of the American Humorists' Series productions.

== Teaching career ==
A teacher for over 50 years, in his professional acting classes, Handman trained many actors including Michael Douglas, and Christopher George.

In December 2013, a book by Jeremy Gerard was published entitled Wynn Place Show: A Biased History of the Rollicking Life & Extreme Times of Wynn Handman and the American Place Theatre. A party to honor the book and Handman, at The Players Club in Manhattan, was featured in The New York Times, and included grateful Handman students such as Richard Gere, Frank Langella and John Leguizamo.

== Personal life ==
Handman was born in New York City, New York, the son of Anna (Kemler), a saleswoman at Saks Fifth Avenue, and Nathan Handman, who ran a printing business. His parents were Jewish emigrants, his father from Minsk, Belarus, and his mother from Płońsk, Poland.

Handman was married to political consultant and arts advocate Bobbie Handman, who died November 13, 2013. Their daughter, Laura Handman, was the wife of Harold M. Ickes. Their other daughter, Liza Handman, is the Vice President of Creative at Drury Design Dynamics, a leader in the meetings and events industry.

Handman died on April 11, 2020, in New York City at the age of 97 from COVID-19.

== Awards ==
- 1989 Townsend Harris Medal of the City College of New York
- 1993 Lucille Lortel Award for Lifetime Achievement
- 1994 Rosetta LeNoire Award from Actors' Equity Association
- 1996 Carnegie Mellon Drama Commitment to Playwriting Award
- 1998 Sanford Meisner Service Award from The Working Theater
- 1999 Obie Award for Sustained Achievement
