= Ann Williams (choreographer) =

American dancer and choreographer (born 1937)

Ann Marie Williams (born Annie Marie Ferrell; October 21, 1937), is an American dancer, choreographer and the founder of the Dallas Black Dance Theatre, the oldest continually operating dance company in Dallas, TX.

== Early life and education ==
Annie Marie Ferrell was born on October 21, 1937, in Coolidge, Texas, to Lloyd and Izora Ferrell. She attended the Sandy Community School, Phillis Wheatley Elementary School in Hubbard, Texas, St. Anthony's Catholic School, and Lincoln High School in Dallas, Texas, graduating in 1955. It was at Lincoln High School that she was first introduced to dance and the local art community.

Williams attended Prairie View A&M University, graduating with a bachelor's degree in Dance before becoming the first African American woman to graduate with an MFA from Texas Woman's University.

== Dance career ==
Williams studied in New York City under Arthur Mitchell, before receiving additional instruction from Edith James, Martha Graham, Doris Humphrey, Charles Weidman and Alvin Ailey. Following her training in New York, she returned to Dallas and began teaching dance for the Dallas Independent School District. In 1968, after receiving a $1 million Ford Foundation grant, she began the first dance department at Bishop College, in Dallas, TX.

Williams started the Dallas Black Dance Academy in 1974 in an effort to provide dance instruction for underprivileged students who were unable to afford private dance instruction. With growing popularity, Williams' Dance Academy evolved into the Dallas Black Dance Theatre in 1976. Williams served as the group's primary creative director until 2014, and now serves on the group's board of directors. Additionally, Williams serves on the board of directors of the Dallas Opera, Arts District Foundation, TAPER, Dallas Dance Council, Texas Women’s University Alumnae, Dance USA and The International Association of Blacks in Dance. The Dallas Black Dance Theatre was commissioned to perform during the 1996 Olympics, in Atlanta, GA. The Dallas Black Dance Theatre, while under Williams' guidance, became the fourth largest African American dance troupe in the United States. Williams was inducted into the Texas Women's Hall of Fame in 2002. Williams was awarded the Texas Medal of Arts in 2017 by the Texas Cultural Trust.

== Personal life ==
She married Nathaniel Williams in 1963; they remained married for 44 years until his death in 2007. The couple has one daughter; Angela.
