= Marion Cuyjet =

American dance instructor

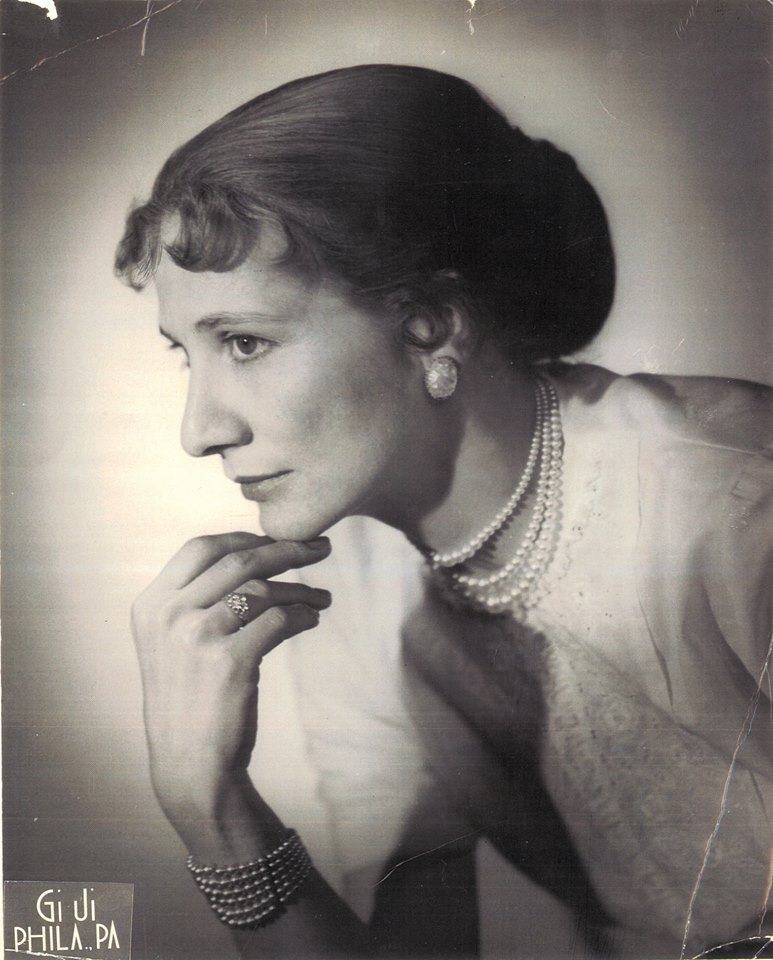
- Born: Marion Durham Cuyjet; July 29, 1920; Philadelphia, Pennsylvania
- Died: October 22, 1996 (aged 76); Philadelphia, Pennsylvania

Marion Durham Cuyjet (/suːˈʒeɪ/; July 29, 1920 – October 22, 1996) was a pioneer in dance education in Black Philadelphia.

== Early life and education ==
Marion Durham Cuyjet was born in Cheswold, Delaware, on July 29, 1920.

Her formal dance training began in the 1930s with Essie Marie Dorsey, who was responsible for initiating formal classical ballet training to Black Philadelphia. Prior to the Civil Rights Movement, African American students of dance were not allowed to join classical ballet classes in Philadelphia because of the color of their skin. Some students studied ballet through private lessons and only a handful of studios, mostly in New York City, would admit black students to special, all black classes. Cuyjet, however, with her fair-skinned complexion, was able to enroll at the Philadelphia Ballet Company, which did not admit black students at that time, and studied there until her identity was revealed after a performance. While at the Dorsey school Cuyjet became close with another student, Sydney Gibson King, who shared the desire to sustain and develop the groundwork laid by Dorsey.

== Career ==
Cuyjet, with King, opened the Sydney-Marion School of Dance in 1946, which led to the forming of their own schools shortly after. The Judimar School of Dance opened in 1948, named after Marion and her daughter Judy (born 1940), in Philadelphia's city center. Some of Judimar's former students include Judith Jamison (later artistic director of the Alvin Ailey American Dance Theater), Arthur Hall, Joan Myers Brown, John Jones, Elmer Ball, Donna Lowe Warren, Delores Browne, Tamara Guillebeaux, and China White.

Many of Cuyjet's students also studied under the English choreographer Antony Tudor, who mentored dancers of color and offered weekly classes at the Philadelphia Ballet Guild, which was established by Tudor in the mid-1950s.

From 1958 through to the 1970s, Cuyjet taught at Maryland State College (now University of Maryland-Eastern Shore), at Delaware State College in Dover, and at Cheyney State University in Cheyney.

After closing her dance studio in 1971, she trained as a movement therapist and then worked at the Philadelphia State Hospital for 11 years.

== Other roles ==
Cuyjet was a dance panelist on the Pennsylvania State Arts Council.

== Death and legacy ==
Cuyjet died on October 22, 1996, at the University of Pennsylvania Medical Center.

== Personal life ==
She was married to Stephen (died 1980), and they had sons called Stephen Jr. and Mark, and a daughter, Judith Coldvin.

== Citations ==
=== Sources ===
- White-Dixon, Melanye P., "Marion Cuyjet: Visionary of Dance Education in Black Philadelphia" (PhD Dissertation, Temple University Graduate Board, 1987).
- Wallace, Andy. Obituary, The Philadelphia Inquirer, October 26, 1996.
