= John Roy Harper II =

American politician

Chair of the United Citizens Party

Personal details
- Born: September 2, 1939 Greenwood
- Died: July 27, 2003 (aged 63); Columbia, SC
- Spouse: Denise Jefferson 1944-2010
- Children: 1
- Education: Fisk University (BA); University of South Carolina (JD)

John Roy Harper II (September 2, 1939 - July 7, 2003) was an American attorney and founder of the United Citizens Party.

== Early life and education ==
John Roy Harper II was born in 1939 to Mary Frances (née Smith) and John Roy Harper, both of whom were longtime teachers at Boylan-Haven-Mather Academy, known as Mather Academy. Harper attended Mather Academy, earned a Bachelor of Arts degree from Fisk University and a Juris Doctor from the University of South Carolina School of Law.

== Career ==
=== Legal work ===
Harper was a plaintiff in several Voting Rights Act cases regarding redistricting plans, including Harper v. Kleindeinst, McCollum v. West. His cases reached the US District Court, the Fourth Circuit Court of Appeals, and the United States Supreme Court.

In 1988, Harper along with NAACP attorney Willie Abrams sued Richland County, resulting in 11 voting districts and the election of four Black members of County Council.

== Political career ==
Harper worked with state lead Kevin Alexander Gray on Jesse Jackson's 1988 presidential campaign.

Harper was one of five men running to be the first Black person elected to Congress from South Carolina since George W. Murray during Reconstruction. In the 1992 Democratic Primary for the 6th Congressional district were Harper, Jim Clyburn, State Senator Herbert Fielding, State Senator Frank Gilbert, and Dr. Kenneth Mosely, an educator.

== Personal life ==
His former wife, Denise Jefferson, was director of the Alvin Ailey American Dance Theater until her death. He was the father of singer, dancer, and choreographer, Francesca Harper.
