= David Roussève =

David Roussève is an American choreographer, writer, director and filmmaker. He founded his company, David Roussève/REALITY in 1988 and has since choreographed, written and directed 14 evening-length works for the group. His latest work for REALITY, Halfway to Dawn premiered in October 2018 at REDCAT in Los Angeles before touring nationally and internationally. His work addresses issues of racism, sexism, and homophobia.

Roussève has been commissioned to create work for a plethora of renowned companies including Ballet Hispanico, Dancing Wheels Company, Houston Ballet, Atlanta Ballet, Cleo Parker Robinson Dance Theater, Dance Alloy, Ilkhom Theatre Company of Tashkent, Uzbekistan, among others. In 2017, he choreographed “Lost in the Stars” (Kurt Weil) for SITI Company and Los Angeles Chamber Orchestra. Roussève’s work “Enough?” a 2016 commission for San Francisco’s RAWDance, was performed at LA’s Ford Theater by Lula Washington Dance Theatre in 2018.

Roussève graduated magna cum laude from Princeton in 1981 as a Guggenheim Fellow for Creative Arts. Awards he has received include a Bessie seven consecutive National Endowment for the Arts Fellowships, three LA Horton awards, the Cal Arts/Alpert Award in Dance, the Distinguished Alumni Award from the Association of Black Princeton Alumni, a Creative Capital Fellowship and two Irvine Fellowships in Dance.

In 1996, Roussève joined the faculty of UCLA’s Department of World Arts and Cultures/Dance, where he is currently Distinguished Professor of Choreography. He has also served as Associate Dean (2014-2015), Acting Dean (2015) and Interim Dean (2015-2017) for the UCLA School of the Arts and Architecture.

== Personal life ==
Roussève was raised in Houston and participated in ACT UP protests while living in New York in the late 1980s and early 1990s. He is married to Steven Rubenstein.
