= Hinton Battle =

American actor (1956–2024)

- Born: Hinton Govorn Battle Jr. November 29, 1956; Neubrücke, Rhineland-Palatinate, West Germany
- Died: January 30, 2024 (aged 67); Los Angeles, California, U.S.
- Occupations: Actor; singer; choreographer; dancer; author
- Years active: 1975–2024

Hinton Govorn Battle Jr. (November 29, 1956 – January 30, 2024) was an American actor, singer, dancer, and choreographer. He won three Tony Awards, all in the category of Featured Actor in a Musical. He was the first to portray the Scarecrow in the stage version of The Wiz (a role then taken on by Michael Jackson in the 1978 film adaptation).

== Early life ==
Hinton Govorn Battle Jr. was born in Neubrücke, Hoppstädten-Weiersbach, West Germany, part of the Baumholder Army Military Community, and raised in Washington, D.C., and New York City. His mother was a homemaker and his father a U.S. Army officer. Battle's talent became apparent at the age of nine. After three years of studying ballet at the Jones-Haywood School of Ballet, he received a scholarship to The School of American Ballet where he studied until the age of fifteen under George Balanchine.

== Career ==
On October 21, 1974, the new musical The Wiz opened at the Morris A. Mechanic Theatre in Baltimore, Maryland, and then moved to Broadway's Majestic Theatre with a new cast on January 5, 1975. This is where Battle made his Broadway debut starring as the Scarecrow.

Battle appeared in 15 films and television programs, including Quantum Leap, Dreamgirls, and Touched by an Angel. On Quantum Leap, he played Thames, the evil Observer from the future, in the final installment of the Evil Leaper trilogy of episodes.

Battle played the role of the Cat in the first U.S. pilot for science-fiction sitcom Red Dwarf, based on the British show of the same name. Notably, he guest-starred as Sweet the jazz demon, in "Once More, with Feeling", Buffy The Vampire Slayer's musical episode in which his spell forces the characters to sing their biggest secrets and fears.

Battle's other Broadway starring roles included Dancin', Dreamgirls, Sophisticated Ladies for which he won his first Tony Award, Chicago (Billy Flynn), and Ragtime (Coalhouse Walker Jr.), which garnered rave reviews from the Chicago press and earned him an Ira Aldridge Award. His role in The Tap Dance Kid earned Hinton a second Tony Award as well as the NAACP Award and the Fred Astaire Award. He won his third Tony Award for Miss Saigon (1991) playing the role of John Thomas. He sang the riveting "Bui Doi", one of the feature songs.

Battle's long list of television credits included Shine, his one-man show presented at the HBO Aspen Comedy Arts Festival; The Kennedy Center's 25th Anniversary; These Old Broads, co-starring Shirley MacLaine, Joan Collins, Debbie Reynolds, and Elizabeth Taylor; and ABC/Disney's Child Star: The Shirley Temple Story where Hinton served as a choreographer and co-star playing Bill 'Bojangles' Robinson.

As a choreographer, Battle's work has been seen on the musical episode of Buffy the Vampire Slayer, "Once More, with Feeling", These Old Broads, Foreign Student (with Charles Dutton), The Golden Globe Awards, Dance in America; the sitcoms Fired Up, Sister, Sister, The Trouble with Normal, and The Boys. Hinton has choreographed promos for Warner Brothers, commercials for Coca-Cola, Chicago the musical, and New York Top Appliances. He served as Associate Choreographer on the 65th and 66th Annual Academy Awards with Debbie Allen.

Off-Broadway, Battle served as co-director and choreographer for Evil Dead The Musical. Having finished choreographing the movie musical Idlewild, he joined with Wynton Marsalis for The Buddy Bolden Story, a feature film about one of the originators of jazz in the United States. He then directed the stage musical Respect, a musical journey of women from the 1900s to 2007. Battle's most recent creation, a dance form called Swop that combines swing and hip-hop, was performed on the highly rated Dancing with the Stars in 2006. In 2014, Battle starred in the off-Broadway production Cindy: The Musical.

In 2017, Battle founded the Hinton Battle Dance Academy in Japan, which closed in 2022.

=== Music ===
In addition to his prolific dancing career, Battle briefly drifted into singing in the mid-1980s. His song "Think We're Gonna Make It" was featured on the soundtrack to the 1986 movie Playing for Keeps, and he released his lone solo album, Untapped, that same year.

=== Writing ===
Battle had written a children's book and had been working on an autobiography at the time of his death.

== Death ==
Battle died after a lengthy illness at Cedars-Sinai Medical Center in Los Angeles on January 30, 2024, at the age of 67. In honor of Battle, the Broadway League announced all 41 Broadway theaters would dim their marquee lights on March 12, 2024. Dimming the lights of Broadway theaters is a tradition reflecting the honoree's influence and career.
