= National Medal of Arts =

Award and title created by the U.S. Congress

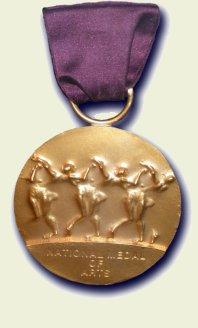
- Awarded for: Outstanding contributions to the excellence, growth, support and availability of the arts in the United States
- Country: United States
- Presented by: President of the United States & National Endowment for the Arts
- Eligibility: Civilians
- Established: 1984 by the United States Congress
- First award: 1985
- Website: arts.gov/honors/medals
- Ribbon of the medal

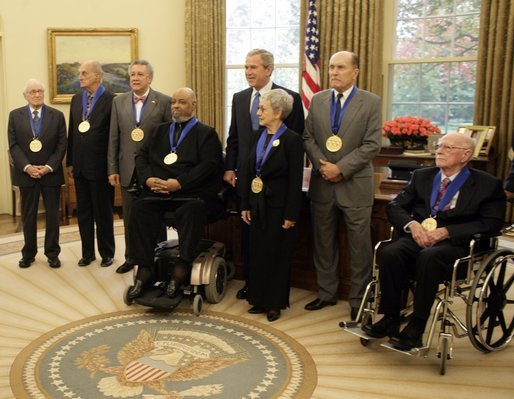
US President George W. Bush with several of the 2005 National Medal of Arts awardees

The National Medal of Arts is an award and title created by the United States Congress in 1984, for the purpose of honoring artists and patrons of the arts. A prestigious American honor, it is the highest honor given to artists and arts patrons by the United States government. Nominations are submitted to the National Council on the Arts, the advisory committee of the National Endowment for the Arts (NEA), who then submits its recommendations to the White House for the president of the United States to award. The medal was designed for the NEA by sculptor Robert Graham.

== Laureates ==
In 1983, prior to the official establishment of the National Medal of Arts, through the President's Committee on the Arts and Humanities, President Ronald Reagan awarded a medal to artists and arts patrons.

Name	Area of Achievement
Pinchas Zukerman	Artist
Frederica von Stade	Artist
Czesław Miłosz	Artist
Maya Lin	Artist
Frank Stella	Artist
Philip Johnson	Artist
Luis Valdez	Artist
The Texaco Philanthropic Foundation	Patron
James Michener	Patron
Philip Morris	Patron
The Cleveland Foundation	Patron
Elma Lewis	Patron
The Dayton Hudson Foundation	Patron

== Recipients of the National Medal of Arts ==
The National Medal of Arts was first awarded in 1985. The ceremony was not held in 2021 or 2022 due to the COVID-19 pandemic therefore the 2021 recipients were given the award in 2023.

=== 1980s ===
Year	Name	Area of Achievement
1985	Elliott Carter Jr.	composer
1985	Ralph Ellison	writer
1985	Jose Ferrer	actor
1985	Martha Graham	dancer, choreographer
1985	Louise Nevelson	sculptor
1985	Georgia O'Keeffe	painter
1985	Leontyne Price	soprano
1985	Dorothy Buffum Chandler	arts patron
1985	Lincoln Kirstein	arts patron
1985	Paul Mellon	arts patron
1985	Alice Tully	arts patron
1985	Hallmark Cards	corporate arts patron
1986	Marian Anderson	contralto singer
1986	Frank Capra	film director
1986	Aaron Copland	composer
1986	Willem de Kooning	painter
1986	Agnes de Mille	choreographer
1986	Eva Le Gallienne	actress, director, author
1986	Alan Lomax	folklorist, scholar
1986	Lewis Mumford	philosopher, literary critic
1986	Eudora Welty	writer
1986	Dominique de Menil	arts patron
1986	Exxon Corporation	corporate arts patron
1986	Seymour H. Knox II	arts patron
1987	Romare Bearden	painter
1987	Ella Fitzgerald	singer
1987	Howard Nemerov	writer, scholar
1987	Alwin Nikolais	dancer, choreographer
1987	Isamu Noguchi	sculptor
1987	William Schuman	composer
1987	Robert Penn Warren	writer, poet
1987	J. W. Fisher	arts patron
1987	Armand Hammer	arts patron
1987	Frances Lewis	arts patron
1987	Sydney Lewis	arts patron
1988	Saul Bellow	writer
1988	Helen Hayes	actress
1988	Gordon Parks	photographer, film director
1988	Ioeh Ming Pei	architect
1988	Jerome Robbins	dancer, choreographer
1988	Rudolf Serkin	pianist
1988	Virgil Thomson	composer, music critic
1988	Sydney Freedberg	art historian, curator
1988	Roger L. Stevens	arts administrator
1988	Brooke Astor	arts patron
1988	Francis Goelet	music patron
1988	Obert Clark Tanner	arts patron
1989	Leopold Adler	preservationist, civic leader
1989	Katherine Dunham	dancer, choreographer
1989	Alfred Eisenstaedt	photographer
1989	Martin Friedman	museum director
1989	Leigh Gerdine	arts patron, civic leader
1989	John Birks "Dizzy" Gillespie	jazz trumpeter
1989	Walker Hancock	sculptor
1989	Vladimir Horowitz	pianist (posthumous)
1989	Czesław Miłosz	writer
1989	Robert Motherwell	painter
1989	John Updike	writer
1989	Dayton Hudson Corporation	corporate arts patron

=== 1990s ===
Year	Name	Area of Achievement
1990	George Abbott	producer
1990	Hume Cronyn	actor
1990	Jessica Tandy	actress
1990	Merce Cunningham	choreographer & dance company director
1990	Jasper Johns	painter & sculptor
1990	Jacob Lawrence	painter
1990	B. B. King	blues musician
1990	David Lloyd Kreeger	arts patron
1990	Harris & Carroll Sterling Masterson	arts patrons
1990	Ian McHarg	landscape architect
1990	Beverly Sills	opera singer
1990	Southeastern Bell Corporation	corporate arts patron
1991	Maurice Abravanel	music director & conductor
1991	Roy Acuff	country singer
1991	Pietro Belluschi	architect
1991	J. Carter Brown	museum director
1991	Charles "Honi" Coles	tap dancer
1991	John O. Crosby	opera director, conductor, administrator
1991	Richard Diebenkorn	painter
1991	R. Philip Hanes	arts patron
1991	Kitty Carlisle Hart	actress, singer & arts administrator
1991	Pearl Primus	choreographer & anthropologist
1991	Isaac Stern	violinist
1991	Texaco	corporate arts patron
1992	Marilyn Horne	opera singer
1992	James Earl Jones	actor
1992	Allan Houser	sculptor
1992	Minnie Pearl	comedian
1992	Robert Saudek	television producer, Museum of Broadcasting founding director
1992	Earl Scruggs	banjo player
1992	Robert Shaw	orchestra conductor, choral director
1992	Billy Taylor	jazz pianist
1992	Robert Venturi and Denise Scott Brown	architects
1992	Robert Wise	director
1992	AT&T	corporate arts patron
1992	Lila Wallace Reader's Digest Fund	foundation arts patron
1993	Walter and Leonore Annenberg	arts patrons
1993	Cabell "Cab" Calloway	singer & bandleader
1993	Ray Charles	singer & musician
1993	Bess Lomax Hawes	folklorist
1993	Stanley Kunitz	poet & educator
1993	Robert Merrill	baritone
1993	Arthur Miller	playwright
1993	Robert Rauschenberg	artist
1993	Lloyd Richards	theatrical director
1993	William Styron	writer
1993	Paul Taylor	dancer & choreographer
1993	Billy Wilder	director, writer & producer
1994	Harry Belafonte	singer & actor
1994	Dave Brubeck	jazz musician
1994	Celia Cruz	singer
1994	Dorothy DeLay	violin teacher
1994	Julie Harris	actress
1994	Erick Hawkins	choreographer
1994	Gene Kelly	actor & dancer
1994	Pete Seeger	composer, lyricist, vocalist, banjo player
1994	Catherine Filene Shouse	arts patron
1994	Wayne Thiebaud	artist, teacher
1994	Richard Wilbur	poet, teacher, critic, literary translator
1994	Young Audiences	arts presenter
1995	Licia Albanese	opera singer
1995	Gwendolyn Brooks	poet
1995	B. Gerald and Iris Cantor	arts patrons
1995	Ossie Davis and Ruby Dee	actors
1995	David Diamond	composer
1995	James Ingo Freed	architect
1995	Bob Hope	entertainer
1995	Roy Lichtenstein	painter, sculptor
1995	Arthur Mitchell	dancer, choreographer
1995	Bill Monroe	bluegrass musician
1995	Urban Gateways	arts education organization
1996	Edward Albee	playwright
1996	Sarah Caldwell	opera conductor
1996	Harry Callahan	photographer
1996	Zelda Fichandler	theater director, producer, educator
1996	Eduardo "Lalo" Guerrero	composer, musician
1996	Lionel Hampton	musician, bandleader
1996	Bella Lewitzky	dancer, choreographer, teacher
1996	Vera List	arts patron
1996	Robert Redford	actor, director, producer
1996	Maurice Sendak	writer, illustrator, designer
1996	Stephen Sondheim	composer, lyricist
1996	Boys Choir of Harlem	performing arts youth group
1997	Louise Bourgeois	sculptor
1997	Betty Carter	jazz vocalist
1997	Agnes Gund	arts patron
1997	Daniel Urban Kiley	landscape architect
1997	Angela Lansbury	actress
1997	James Levine	opera conductor, pianist
1997	Tito Puente	Latin percussionist, musician
1997	Jason Robards	actor
1997	Edward Villella	dancer, choreographer
1997	Doc Watson	bluegrass guitarist, vocalist
1997	MacDowell Colony	artist colony
1998	Jacques d'Amboise	dancer, choreographer, educator
1998	Antoine "Fats" Domino	rock 'n' roll pianist, singer
1998	Ramblin' Jack Elliott	folk singer, songwriter
1998	Frank Gehry	architect
1998	Barbara Handman	arts advocate
1998	Agnes Martin	visual artist
1998	Gregory Peck	actor, producer
1998	Roberta Peters	opera singer
1998	Philip Roth	writer
1998	Sara Lee Corporation	corporate arts patron
1998	Steppenwolf Theatre Company	arts organization
1998	Gwen Verdon	actress, dancer
1999	Irene Diamond	arts patron
1999	Aretha Franklin	singer
1999	Michael Graves	architect, designer
1999	Odetta	singer, music historian
1999	The Juilliard School	performing arts school
1999	Norman Lear	producer, writer, director, advocate
1999	Rosetta LeNoire	actress, producer
1999	Harvey Lichtenstein	arts administrator
1999	Lydia Mendoza	singer
1999	George Segal	sculptor
1999	Maria Tallchief	ballerina

=== 2000s ===
Year	Name	Area of Achievement
2000	Maya Angelou	poet, writer
2000	Eddy Arnold	country singer
2000	Mikhail Baryshnikov	dancer & director
2000	Benny Carter	jazz musician
2000	Chuck Close	painter
2000	Horton Foote	playwright, screenwriter
2000	Lewis Manilow	arts patron
2000	National Public Radio, cultural programming division	broadcaster
2000	Claes Oldenburg	sculptor
2000	Itzhak Perlman	violinist
2000	Harold Prince	theater director, producer
2000	Barbra Streisand	actress, singer & director
2001	Alvin Ailey Dance Foundation	modern dance company and school
2001	Rudolfo Anaya	writer
2001	Johnny Cash	singer & songwriter
2001	Kirk Douglas	actor
2001	Helen Frankenthaler	painter
2001	Judith Jamison	artistic director, choreographer, dancer
2001	Yo-Yo Ma	cellist
2001	Mike Nichols	director, producer
2002	Florence Knoll Bassett	architect
2002	Trisha Brown	artistic director, choreographer, dancer
2002	Philippe de Montebello	museum director
2002	Uta Hagen	actress, drama teacher
2002	Lawrence Halprin	landscape architect
2002	Al Hirschfeld	artist, illustrator
2002	George Jones	singer
2002	Ming Cho Lee	theater designer
2002	William "Smokey" Robinson	songwriter, musician
2003	Austin City Limits	PBS television program
2003	Beverly Cleary	writer
2003	Rafe Esquith	arts educator
2003	Suzanne Farrell	dancer, choreographer, company director, educator
2003	Buddy Guy	blues musician
2003	Ron Howard	actor, director & producer
2003	Mormon Tabernacle Choir	choral group
2003	Leonard Slatkin	symphony orchestra conductor
2003	George Strait	country singer, songwriter
2003	Tommy Tune	dancer, actor, choreographer, director
2004	Andrew W. Mellon Foundation	philanthropic foundation
2004	Ray Bradbury	author
2004	Carlisle Floyd	opera composer
2004	Frederick Hart	sculptor (posthumous)
2004	Anthony Hecht	poet
2004	John Ruthven	wildlife artist
2004	Vincent Scully	architectural historian & educator
2004	Twyla Tharp	contemporary dance choreographer
2005	Louis Auchincloss	author
2005	James DePreist	symphony orchestra conductor
2005	Paquito D'Rivera	jazz musician
2005	Robert Duvall	actor
2005	Leonard Garment	arts advocate
2005	Ollie Johnston	pioneering film animator & artist
2005	Wynton Marsalis	jazz musician & educator
2005	Pennsylvania Academy of the Fine Arts	arts education
2005	Tina Ramirez	dancer & choreographer
2005	Dolly Parton	singer & songwriter
2006	William Bolcom	composer
2006	Cyd Charisse	actress & dancer
2006	Roy DeCarava	photographer
2006	Wilhelmina Holladay	arts patron
2006	Interlochen Center for the Arts	summer arts camp and winter arts focused boarding high school
2006	Erich Kunzel	conductor
2006	Preservation Hall Jazz Band	jazz ensemble
2006	Gregory Rabassa	literary translator
2006	Viktor Schreckengost	industrial designer/sculptor
2006	Ralph Stanley	bluegrass musician
2007	Morten Lauridsen	composer
2007	N. Scott Momaday	author
2007	Craig Noel	director
2007	Roy Neuberger	arts patron
2007	Les Paul	electric guitar pioneer
2007	Henry Z. Steinway	arts patron
2007	George Tooker	painter
2007	Lionel Hampton Jazz Festival (University of Idaho)	music festival
2007	Andrew Wyeth	painter
2008	Stan Lee	comic book writer, editor
2008	Richard M. Sherman	songwriter
2008	Robert B. Sherman	songwriter
2008	Olivia de Havilland	actress
2008	Hank Jones	jazz pianist
2008	Jesús Moroles	sculptor
2008	Ford's Theatre Society	historic theatre organization
2008	Fisk Jubilee Singers, (Fisk University)	African American choral group
2008	José Limón Dance Foundation	dance troupe
2008	The Presser Foundation	music philanthropy organization
2009	Bob Dylan	singer & songwriter
2009	Clint Eastwood	actor & director
2009	Milton Glaser	graphic designer
2009	Maya Lin	artist & architect
2009	Rita Moreno	actress
2009	Jessye Norman	operatic soprano
2009	Joseph P. Riley Jr.	mayor
2009	Frank Stella	artist
2009	Michael Tilson Thomas	conductor
2009	John Williams	composer, conductor & pianist
2009	Oberlin Conservatory of Music	
2009	School of American Ballet	

=== 2010s ===
Year	Name	Area of Achievement
2010	Robert Brustein	theater director & producer
2010	Van Cliburn	classical pianist
2010	Mark di Suvero	sculptor
2010	Donald Hall	poet
2010	Jacob's Pillow Dance Festival	
2010	Quincy Jones	composer & music producer
2010	Harper Lee	novelist
2010	Sonny Rollins	jazz musician
2010	Meryl Streep	actress
2010	James Taylor	singer & songwriter
2011	Will Barnet	artist
2011	Rita Dove	poet
2011	Al Pacino	actor
2011	Emily Rauh Pulitzer	arts patron
2011	Martin Puryear	sculptor
2011	Mel Tillis	singer & songwriter
2011	United Service Organization (USO)	provides programs and entertainment to the U.S. military and their families
2011	André Watts	classical pianist
2012	Herb Alpert	musician
2012	Lin Arison	arts education advocate
2012	Joan Myers Brown	dancer, choreographer and artistic director
2012	Renée Fleming	opera singer
2012	Ernest Gaines	author & teacher
2012	Ellsworth Kelly	artist
2012	Tony Kushner	playwright
2012	George Lucas	film director
2012	Elaine May	actress & director
2012	Laurie Olin	landscape architect
2012	Allen Toussaint	composer, producer and performer
2012	Washington Performing Arts Society	arts presenter
2013	Julia Alvarez	novelist, poet & essayist
2013	Brooklyn Academy of Music	presenter
2013	Joan Harris	arts patron
2013	Bill T. Jones	dancer & choreographer
2013	John Kander	musical theater composer
2013	Jeffrey Katzenberg	director and CEO of DreamWorks
2013	Maxine Hong Kingston	writer
2013	Albert Maysles	documentary filmmaker
2013	Linda Ronstadt	musician
2013	Billie Tsien & Tod Williams	architects
2013	James Turrell	visual artist
2014	John Baldessari	visual artist
2014	Ping Chong	theater director, choreographer, and video and installation artist
2014	Míriam Colón	actress
2014	The Doris Duke Charitable Foundation	supporting creative expression across the country
2014	Sally Field	actress and filmmaker
2014	Ann Hamilton	visual artist
2014	Stephen King	author
2014	Meredith Monk	composer, singer, and performer
2014	George Shirley	tenor
2014	University Musical Society	presenting the performing arts to communities in Michigan
2014	Tobias Wolff	author and educator
2015	Mel Brooks	actor, comedian, writer
2015	Sandra Cisneros	author
2015	Eugene O'Neill Theater Center	theater
2015	Morgan Freeman	actor
2015	Philip Glass	composer
2015	Berry Gordy	record producer, songwriter
2015	Santiago Jiménez, Jr.	musician
2015	Moises Kaufman	theater
2015	Ralph Lemon	dance
2015	Audra McDonald	actor
2015	Luis Valdez	playwright, actor, director
2015	Jack Whitten	painter
2016– 2018	Not awarded	
2019	Alison Krauss	singer
2019	Sharon Percy Rockefeller	arts supporter
2019	The Musicians of the United States Military	military musicians
2019	Jon Voight	actor

=== 2020s ===
Year	Name	Area of Achievement
2020	Toby Keith	country musician
2020	Ricky Skaggs	country musician
2020	Mary Costa	operatic soprano
2020	Nick Ut	photojournalist
2020	Earl A. "Rusty" Powell, III	director, National Gallery of Art
2021	Bruce Springsteen	musician
2021	Gladys Knight	singer
2021	Mindy Kaling	actress
2021	Julia Louis-Dreyfus	actress
2021	Jose Feliciano	singer
2021	Vera Wang	fashion designer
2021	Joan Shigekawa	film director
2021	Judith Francisca Baca	artist
2021	Fred Eychaner	businessman and philanthropist
2021	Antonio Martorell	painter
2021	The Billie Holiday Theatre	theatre
2021	The International Association of Blacks in Dance	preserves and promotes dance by people of African ancestry or origin
2022	Ruth Asawa	sculptor
2022	Randy Batista	photographer
2022	Clyde Butcher	photographer
2022	Country Music Hall of Fame and Museum	museum
2022	Missy Elliott	musician
2022	Flaco Jiménez	musician
2022	Eva Longoria	actress
2022	Idina Menzel	actress and musician
2022	Herbert Ohta	musician
2022	Bruce Sagan	arts patron
2022	Carrie Mae Weems	artist
2023	Mark Bradford	visual artist
2023	Ken Burns	documentary filmmaker
2023	Bruce Cohen	film producer
2023	Alex Katz	visual artist
2023	Jo Carole Lauder	arts patron
2023	Spike Lee	film director
2023	Queen Latifah	musician and actress
2023	Selena Quintanilla	musician
2023	Steven Spielberg	film director
2024	Cappy McGarr	arts patron

== Declined honors ==
In 1989, composer and conductor Leonard Bernstein refused his award, allegedly due to how a federal grant to an art show on AIDS had been revoked.

In 1992, composer and lyricist Stephen Sondheim refused his award, claiming that the NEA had "become a victim of its own and others' political infighting and is rapidly being transformed into a conduit and a symbol of censorship and repression rather than encouragement and support".

In 1997, poet Adrienne Rich refused her award as a protest against "inconsistencies" between art and "the cynical politics" of the Clinton administration.

== See also ==
- National Humanities Medal
- National Medal of Science
- National Medal of Technology and Innovation
