= Barbara Handman =

American activist and political consultant (1928–2013)

- Born: Barbara Ann Schlein; March 11, 1928; Philadelphia, Pennsylvania, U.S.
- Died: November 14, 2013 (aged 85); New York City, New York, U.S.
- Other names: Bobbie
- Occupation(s): Arts activist, political consultant
- Spouse: Wynn Handman (m. 1950)
- Children: 2

Barbara "Bobbie" Handman (March 11, 1928 – November 14, 2013) was an American political consultant and arts activist, known for her role in preserving historic Broadway theater houses. She was the executive vice-president and New York City office director of People for the American Way from 1981 until 2003.

== Formative years and family ==
Born in Philadelphia, Pennsylvania on March 11, 1928, Handman was the wife of stage director and teacher Wynn Handman.

Handman's daughter, Laura Handman, is married to Harold M. Ickes.

== Career ==
In 1982, Handman helped to found Save the Theatres, an organization that tried unsuccessfully to prevent the razing of the Morosco, Helen Hayes, and Bijou Theaters. In 1988, the group succeeded in having twenty-eight Broadway houses designated as landmarks by the New York City Board of Estimate.

Handman served on the board of the Eleanor Roosevelt Foundation and on the Franklin Delano Roosevelt Memorial Commission.

She was awarded the National Medal of Arts in 1998 for her work as an arts advocate.

== Death ==
Handman died in New York City on November 14, 2013.
