= White Dalmatian =

English version of Czech rock musical

- Music: Jan Laxián
- Lyrics: Simona Votyová/Steve Josephson
- Book: Mirjam Landa

White Dalmatian is the English language premiere of the long-running, family “rock” musical from Prague, Czech Republic. Bily Dalmatin (as it is known in its native Czech) has been playing at the Divadlo Kalich in Prague for over two years.

== Productions ==
The musical premiered in Prague. Directed by Mirjam Landa, Music by Peter Günter and Jan Maxián, Choreographed by Linda Rančáková and Eva Severinová, Costumes by Lucie Loosová and Book and Lyrics by Simona Votyová. It starred Vlasta Korec, Ondřej Nosálek and Ondřej Izdný (Dalmatian), Lenda Jurošková, Jana Vaculíková and Jana Fabiánová (Ola/Piglet/Witch), Lucie Penertová and Markéta Procházková (Ladybug/Red Riding Hood/Grandmother), Anastázie Landová and Kristýna Zezulová (Claire/Star) and Václav Krátký and Filip Gröger (Wolf/Pony/Butterfly).

In 2010, Gallimaufry Performing Arts did a workshop of the show in Laguna Beach, CA. This production featured English translations and a re-worked plot by Steve Josephson. Directed by Steve Josephson, Choreographed by Kira Josephson, Musically Directed by Amy Hitchcock, Costumes and Props by Julie Gibson. It starred Angela Houle (Witch), Jeff Purkins (Dalmatian), Jessie McLean (Ladybug), Kira Josephson (Ola), Erika Tang (Piglet), Carson Miller (Pony/Wolf), Clair Howell (Star), Hannah D'Amato (Red Riding Hood), Emily Baker (Claire) and Karen McBride (Grandmother).

== Plot ==
Note: This is the plot for the American version of the show. The original Czech varies slightly.

Act One

The show opens in the factory of an evil Ogre. He demands his workers to make him a special toy unlike anything he's seen before ("This is the Story"). The workers brainstorm different ideas, and one worker comes up with the perfect idea.

We then see Claire, a young girl who is having trouble falling asleep because she is so excited for her birthday the next day. She is on her bed with her four toys; a Witch marionette whose strings are broken, a battery operated Ladybug, a pull-string Piglet and a wind-up Pony. Her parents, seen only as two giant sets of eyes, finally convince her to fall asleep. The next day, Claire wakes up to find a giant present from her Grandmother. When she opens it, she meets Billy, the Polkadot Dalmatian - coming soon to a store near you. Claire loves the Dalmatian and introduces him to the rest of her toys who are all impressed with his bright, colorful spots, with the exception of the Witch. Claire is enchanted by the fact that she can't figure out how the Dalmatian runs, and decides he must be magical. She realizes that she does not have enough room on her bed for the Dalmatian, and decides to put her Witch marionette under her bed, seeing as her strings are broken anyway.

The Witch, mortified at having been cast aside, decides to put a spell on the Dalmatian. She steals all of his spots and hides them in the Forest of Fantasy. She then escapes to the Forest herself, where the others will not be able to find her. When the toys wake up, Dalmatian is horrified to find that his spots have vanished. The others try to console him, but he is convinced that Claire, seeing that he is defective, will throw him away just like she did to the Witch. Piglet, the smartest of the toys, deduces that the Witch must have sent his spots to the Forest of Fantasy. She explains that the Forest is where all fairy tales take place. In order to get there, the toys must fall asleep while walking. This will put them in a place that's between sleeping and waking; where anything is possible ("Forest of Fantasy").

The Witch sees that the toys have figured out her scheme, so she summons all evil to help her with her plan ("Witchlike"). She separates the toys from one another so they will never be able to find their way back home. When the Dalmatian arrives in the Forest, he realizes that he is alone and tries to muster all his courage and carry on alone. He runs into Red Riding Hood, who is on her way to her Grandmother's house. She is frightened by the Dalmatian, who, without any spots, looks like a Polar Bear. Dalmatian tries to convince her that he is, in fact, a Dalmatian, and tells her how he lost his spots ("Sad Dalmatian"). Little Red apologizes, and she and Dalmatian venture off into the Forest. Before she can reach her Granny's, Red Riding Hood runs into a Wolf and his pack ("Wolf"). She tries to escape, but the Wolf is determined to eat her. Dalmatian hears Little Red's shrieks, and runs to save her. The Wolf, thinking the Dalmatian to be a Polar Bear, hands over Little Red and runs away. Little Red thanks Dalmatian for saving her by giving him a kiss. They both stumble, love-struck, back into the Forest.

Meanwhile, Ladybug is lost in the Forest and getting very hungry. She comes across an apple tree, and decides to eat one. As soon as she bites into it, she begins choking and realizes that it is not an apple. When she recovers, she is delighted to find that it is one of Dalmatian's spots. She runs into the Forest to try to find the others. Piglet and Pony come across the same clearing, and Pony, who is exhausted and hungry, begs Piglet to feed him some apples. After giving him more than his fair share of food, she tosses him one last apple and goes to look for help. Pony chomps into the apple, and begins to choke. He calls for Piglet to help him, but when she returns she thinks he is dancing. She finally realizes he is choking and helps him. They are thrilled when they see that the apple was, in fact, a spot and they go off in search of the others.

Dalmatian is lost in the Forest, and beginning to get discouraged. He runs into Ola, a cheeky monkey, and her gang of mischief makers. Ola tells him not to be afraid, and to just have fun ("Ola"). When Claire wakes up, and discovers that all her toys are gone, she calls frantically for her Grandmother to come and help.

Act Two

Claire and her Grandmother are practicing Yoga on her bed. Claire is frustrated and can't understand how she is ever going to find her toys. Grandmother tells her to take deep breaths and look within herself to find the answer ("Grandmother's Advice"). She instructs Claire to go under the bed, and look at things from the Witch's perspective. Claire realizes how inconsiderate she was to the Witch, and decides she must go into the Forest of Fantasy to get her toys back and apologize.

Dalmatian and Ola are admiring the night sky, and Ola notices a constellation she's never seen before; the Polkadot Dipper. Dalmatian realizes that they are his spots, and that the Witch has hidden them up in the sky. He and Ola run off to find the Ladybug, who can fly into the sky to get them down. Claire arrives in the Forest of Fantasy, and runs into the Wolf. She asks him for directions, and after he is convinced that she has neither a little red hood nor any sweets for Granny, sends her on her way. Ladybug is running out of batteries, so she decides to sit down for a moment. As she is resting, a Butterfly comes over and begins to flirt with her. Soon, he is followed by a Dragonfly and a Beetle, who are also interested in Ladybug. She is very tired of only being appreciated for her good looks, and tries to convince them that there is more to her than just her beauty ("Ladybug").

Claire comes across a path of apple cores, recognizes that Pony must have been here, and follows them off. Dalmatian and Ola finally find Ladybug, and they explain to her that she must fly into the sky to get Dalmatian's spots back. Once she takes off, Piglet and Pony arrive, and they all sit and wait for Ladybug to come back. Never one to tolerate boredom, Ola begins to mess with the other toys and gets them to dance to pass the time ("Stomp"). One by one the spots start falling from the sky, and just when the Dalmatian has re-attached them all, a Star is thrown down. She introduces herself as Polaris, the North Star. She is very angry at having been removed from her place in the sky, and commands to be returned. When the Ladybug shows up, very proud at the job she has done, the Star throws a tantrum and demands that the Ladybug be arrested. Ola steps in and convinces everyone to be friends and make the best of a bad situation ("O, Da, Da").

Claire sees Polaris as she is thrown from the sky, and decides to follow her. Meanwhile, the Witch is furious that the toys have found each other and the Dalmatian's spots, and decides that drastic measures must be taken. She flips through her spell book and finds the spell for "Ending a Story". She tries to cast the spell, but realizes too late that she does not have all the ingredients. She decides that she must fly to the toys and take matters into her own hands.

The toys, having all become friends again, try to figure out how to get home. Ladybug suggests that if she puts Polaris back in the sky, she can guide them home. Ola goes off in search of batteries so that Ladybug has the strength to fly. Pony gets very emotional that their journey is coming to an end, and launches into a melo-dramatic ballad which the rest of the toys also get swept up in ("Sad Dalmatian [reprise]"). Just when the toys are ready to leave, the Witch arrives and summons a swarm of Killer Bees to attack them ("Killer Bees"). Claire arrives and sees the toys being stung. She steals the hive from the King and Queen, and eventually leads the bees away. The toys are all thrilled to see Claire again, but Claire is distracted and says that she must find the Witch and apologize. The Witch is spotted, and Claire runs to her and hugs her. She explains that she realizes she was inconsiderate and hopes that the Witch can forgive her. The Witch then apologizes for having lost her temper. Caught up in the emotions, Dalmatian apologizes for having gotten so upset about losing his spots, Pony apologizes to Piglet for being lazy and Piglet apologizes to Pony for being bossy. Polaris, who is fed up with all the schmaltz, loses her temper. She quickly composes herself, and then realizes that she too has something to apologize for. The toys all invite Ola to come back with them, but Ola decides that if she were gone there wouldn't be anyone to wreak havoc and the Forest wouldn't be nearly as much fun. Polaris then summons her Starlets to come down and help her carry the toys and Claire back to their room ("Star Song").

The toys and Claire arrive safely in their room, where they are met by Grandmother. They all had a fun adventure, but are glad to be back home. They decide only one thing will make their journey complete - a song ("Finale").

== Musical numbers ==
Act One

- This is the Story - Ogre, Factory Workers
- Forest of Fantasy - Ladybug, Dalmatian, Piglet, Pony, Ensemble
- Witchlike - Witch, Ghouls, Goblins, Skeletons
- Sad Dalmatian - Dalmatian, Red Riding Hood
- Wolf Song - Wolf, Red Riding Hood, Wolf Pack
- Ola - Ola, Monkeys

Act Two

- Grandmother's Advice - Grandmother, Claire
- Ladybug - Ladybug, Beetle, Butterfly, Dragonfly, Monkeys
- Stomp - Ola, Piglet, Pony, Dalmatian
- O, Da, Da - Ola, Piglet, Pony, Ladybug, Dalmatian, Star
- Sad Dalmatian [reprise] - Pony, Dalmatian, Ladybug
- Killer Bees - Piglet, Pony, Ladybug, Dalmatian, Ola, Star, Killer Bees
- Star Song - Star, Starlets
- Finale - Company

== Characters ==
- Dalmatian - Billy, the Polkadot Dalmatian, is given to Claire as a gift for her birthday. When he is given the Witch's spot on the bed, the Witch casts a spell on him and steals his spots. Fearing that Claire will no longer love him, he ventures into the Forest of Fantasy to retrieve his spots.
- Witch - Witch is a marionette given to Claire by her mother. Although she is loved by Claire, her strings are broken. So when Claire receives the Dalmatian for her birthday, the Witch is tossed under the bed. In a fit of anger, she casts a spell on the Dalmatian and steals his spots. She then escapes to the Forest of Fantasy.
- Ladybug - Ladybug was Claire's first toy. She uses batteries to operate, and she frequently runs out of power, leaving the other toys to find her new batteries. She is a very attractive, French toy, and she often has to ward off unwanted admirers (such as a Butterfly, a Dragonfly and a Beetle).
- Piglet - Piglet is the smartest of all Claire's toys. She uses reason and logic to help find Dalmatian's spots. She can often get bossy and frustrated when everything doesn't go according to plan. She is operated with a pull string.
- Pony - Pony is a wind-up toy. He is always hungry, usually for apples, and he doesn't like a lot of exercise. He spends most of his time with Piglet, who does everything she can to motive him.
- Claire - Claire is a young girl who receives the Dalmatian for her birthday. She impulsively casts her Witch marionette aside because her strings are broken. When she wakes up and finds that all her toys have gone missing, her Grandmother teaches her to look within herself and figure out what she did that made them leave. When she realizes how inconsiderate she was, she goes into the Forest of Fantasy to apologize to all of her toys, especially the Witch.
- Ola - Ola is a monkey that lives in the Forest of Fantasy. She loves to cause mischief and rile people up. She becomes friends with the Dalmatian and helps him to find his spots. She lives life with no regrets, and tries to find the fun in every situation. All the other monkeys follow her lead.
- Red Riding Hood - Red Riding Hood lives in the Forest of Fantasy, and is trying to get to her Grandmother's house with some cakes that she made. She becomes friends with the Dalmatian, who later saves her from the Wolf.
- Star - Polaris is the North Star, and she is part of the Little Dipper. When the Ladybug accidentally plucks her out of the sky, she makes no secret of the fact that she is very upset. Although she can be over-dramatic, and a bit of a diva, she eventually becomes friends with the toys and helps them find their way home.
- Grandmother - Grandmother is very close to Claire, and is the one that gives her the Dalmatian. She practices Yoga, and always has good advice. She teaches Claire to re-trace her steps to figure out where all her toys have gone.
- Wolf - The Wolf lives in the Forest of Fantasy, and follows Red Riding Hood on her way to her Grandmother's. Although he acts tough and ferocious, he is eventually scared off by the Dalmatian.
- Ogre - The Ogre is the owner of the factory where the Dalmatian is built. He is very demanding, and has no sympathy for his workers.
- Forest of Fantasy creatures - include Jack and the Giant, Cinderella, Robin Hood, Hansel and Gretel, The Frog Princess, Killer Bees, Wolves, Gnomes, Ghouls, Skeletons, Fairies and Trolls.
