= Jones-Haywood School of Ballet =

Dance school in Washington, D.C., U.S.

Coordinates: 38.94882°N 77.02736°W

The Jones-Haywood Dance School in 2026

The Jones-Haywood Dance School, formerly known as The Jones-Haywood School of Ballet, was founded in 1941 by Doris W. Jones and Claire Haywood in Washington, D.C., to teach young dancers of color classical ballet.

Graduates have danced with Alvin Ailey, Philadanco, Dutch National Ballet, the Washington Ballet, Paul Taylor Dance Company, on Broadway, and also become choreographers, actors and dance educators. Famous alums include Chita Rivera, Hinton Battle, Sylvester Campbell, Louis Johnson and Sandra Fortune-Green.

Jones and Haywood founded the Capitol Ballet Company, a racially integrated professional ballet troupe from 1961 to 1989. The school was also home to the Jones-Haywood Dancers.

Haywood died in 1978 and Jones died in 2006. The school is now directed by Sandra Fortune-Green.
