= Denise Jefferson =

American dance educator

Denise Adele Jefferson (November 1, 1944 – July 17, 2010) was an American dance educator who served as the director of the Ailey School of the Alvin Ailey American Dance Theater from 1984 until her death.

== Biography ==
Jefferson was born in Chicago and began studying ballet as an eight-year-old. Despite her skills as a dancer, she didn't pursue a career in ballet because she "had never seen anyone who wasn't white in a ballet company". She majored in college in French language, earning her undergraduate degree at Wheaton College in Norton, Massachusetts and a master's degree from New York University. She was awarded a scholarship to attend the Martha Graham Center of Contemporary Dance and began her professional dance career with Pearl Lang's Dance Theater. She was the mother of singer, dancer, and choreographer, Francesca Harper and sister of Pulitzer Prize winning writer Margo Jefferson, a former theatre critic for The New York Times. She was the former wife of attorney and activist John Roy Harper II.

Hired by the Ailey School of the Alvin Ailey American Dance Theater in 1974, Denise Jefferson was named as the school's director in 1984, having been selected by Alvin Ailey himself. She held the position as director until her death in 2010, overseeing a school that grew to a student body of 3,500 dancers with 75 instructors, teaching styles including classical ballet, jazz dance and modern dance. Jefferson established a joint degree program with Fordham University in which students receive dance training and traditional liberal arts course, earning a bachelor of fine arts degree from Fordham upon completion. Of the approximately 140 credits needed to earn the combined degree, half would be at the Ailey School in choreography, technique and other dance-related courses, with the balance being in traditional liberal arts courses at Fordham.

== Death ==
A resident of Manhattan, she died there, aged 65, on July 17, 2010, from ovarian cancer. She was survived by her daughter, Francesca Harper.
