= Lula Washington Dance Theatre =

Modern dance company based in Los Angeles

Lula Washington Dance Theatre is a contemporary modern dance company based in Los Angeles, California. Founded in 1980, the repertoire dance ensemble has performed across the United States and toured internationally. In 2025, the company headlined the Auckland Arts Festival in New Zealand.

== History ==
After graduating from UCLA, Lula Washington established the Los Angeles Contemporary Dance Theatre in 1980. She and her husband, Erwin Washington, a journalist and playwright, founded the dance company to offer creative opportunities for minority artists in Los Angeles, particularly in South Central Los Angeles.

In the mid-1980s, the company morphed into the Lula Washington Dance Theatre (LWDT). A multiracial troupe of approximately one dozen professional dancers, LWDT tours nationally and internationally. LWDT performs primarily choreography by Lula Washington, Los Angeles’ best-known African American choreographer who received choreography credits for the movies Avatar and The Little Mermaid.

LWDT is a member of The International Association of Blacks in Dance and hosted the IABD annual conference in 1992, 2005, 2011, and 2018.

In 2021, LWDT received its second-largest gift in company history, a nearly one million dollar grant payable over four years from the Andrew W. Mellon Foundation. The gift will fund building upgrades, dancers’ salaries, and administrative support.

== Building ==
In 1988, the Lula Washington Contemporary Dance Foundation purchased an approximately 12,600 square-foot former Italian restaurant building on Crenshaw Boulevard in Los Angeles. The building serves as a community cultural center and houses four dance studios, instructional areas, and the LWDT school and administrative offices. In 1994, the Northridge Earthquake destroyed significant parts of the building, and LWDT received a $1.3 million gift—the largest in LWDT’s history—from the Federal Emergency Management Agency to rebuild its building.

== School ==
Established in the 1983, the Lula Washington Dance School offers elementary and advanced classes in ballet, jazz, African, tap, and other dance styles. The school’s annual Kwanzaa celebration is a South Los Angeles tradition. The school’s motto is, “I Do Dance, Not Drugs.”

== Notable performances and tours ==
LWDT has performed in more than 150 cities in the United States and around the world. Notable venues and tours include:

- Auckland Arts Festival, New Zealand (2025)
- China (25-day tour to Hangzhou, Jiaxing, Kaifeng, Luohe, Wuhan, Xi'an, Xinyang, Xucheng, and Zhengzhou) (2011)
- International Book Fair, LA artists showcase, Guadalajara, Mexico (2010)
- Jacob’s Pillow, Becket, Massachusetts
- John Anson Ford Amphitheatre, Zev Yaroslovsly Signature Series (with Complexions Ballet), Los Angeles (2013)
- Joyce Theatre, New York, NY
- Kennedy Center, Washington, DC
- Lincoln Center Out of Doors, New York, NY
- Montclair State University, New Jersey (2010)
- New Jersey Performing Arts Center, Newark, NJ
- Ordway Theater, Minneapolis, MN (2015)
- Pioneer Center, Reno, Nevada

== Repertoire ==
LWDT’s repertoire includes works that explore homelessness, 9/11, police brutality, the Civil Rights movement, and the Underground Railroad, and other topics. The following is a representative sample.

- African Ukumbusho. Choreographer: Lula Washington.
- And We Can Fly (2025). Tamica Washington-Miller.
- Angelitos Negros. Choreographer: Donald McKayle
- At First Sight (2013). Choreographer: Christopher Huggins. Music: Sigur Rós.
- Check This Out (1997). Choreographer: Lula Washington.
- Communion. Choreographer: Donald Byrd.
- Death and Eros. Choreographer: Donald McKayle.
- Enough? (2016). Choreographer: David Rousseve.
- From the Heart (1984). Choreographer: Lula Washington.
- Games. Choreographer: Donald McKayle.
- Global Village. Choreographer: Lula Washington.
- Hallowed (2018). Choreographer: Kyle Abraham
- Hands Up, A Testimony (2020). Choreographer: Tommie Waheed Evans.
- Harambe Suite. Choreographer: Lula Washington.
- Let Their Voices Be Heard (1988). Choreographer: Lula Washington.
- Little Rock Nine. Choreographer: Lula Washington.
- Love Is... (2010). Choreographer: Christopher Huggins.
- To Lula With Love / Warrior (2020). Choreographer: Christopher Huggins.
- Magical Cusp (2017). Choreographer: Gaspard Louis.
- Open Your Eyes. Choreographer: Lula Washington.
- Peeps. Choreographer: Tamica Washington-Miller.
- Rainbow Etudes. Choreographer: Donald McKayle.
- Reign. Choreographer: Rennie Harris
- Search for Humanism. Choreographer: Lula Washington.
- Snowy Day. Choreographer: Tamica Washington-Miller.
- Songs of the Disinherited. Choreographer: Donald McKayle.
- Spontaneous Combustion. Choreographer: Lula Washington.
- Temporary Spaces. Choreographer: Anthony Burrell
- The Master Plan (2025). Choreographer: Lula Washington.
- The Message. Choreographer: Lula Washington.
- The Movement. Choreographer: Lula Washington.
- There is Always Tomorrow. Choreographer: Tamica Washington-Miller.
- Tribute to the Release of Nelson Mandela and the Youth of South Africa (South African Boot Dance) (2005). Choreographer: Lula Washington.
- Turn the Page (2013). Choreographer: Lula Washington.
- We Wore the Mask. Choreographer: Lula Washington.
- www.connections.2010. Choreographer: Lula Washington. Music: Rolling Stones and Michael Jackson.
- Zayo (2020). Choreographer: Esie Mensah.

== Leadership ==
- Lula Washington, co-founder and artistic director
- Erwin Washington, co-founder and executive director
- Tamica Washington-Miller, associate director
- Marcus L. Miller, musical director, resident composer and percussionist
- Milton Tatum, technical director

== Dancers ==
- Joniece Boykins (2012-)
- Elaine Bowers Brooks
- Quron Clarks (2016-)
- Thomas Davis
- Zenmarah Duruisseau
- Danny Guerrero (2017-)
- Kaitwan Jackson, Apprentice (2021-)
- Ongelle Johnson (2018-)
- Khaleela Jones
- Kozue Kasahara (2019-)
- Micah Moch
- Glenn Rodriguez, Apprentice
- Kylie Shea, Special Guest
- Michael Tomlin III
- Diána Worby, Apprentice (2020-)

== Former Dancers ==
- Joshua Alexander
- Jaela Anderson
- Naila Ansari
- Michael Battle
- Mataji Booker
- Bernard Brown
- Dwayne Brown
- Queala Clancy
- Thomas Davis
- Tehran Dixon
- Khilea Douglass
- Simone Ewell
- Christopher Frazier
- Ralph Glenmore
- Krystal Hicks
- Shameika Hines
- Saidiya Imari
- Khalelah Jones
- Grace Marti
- Micah Moch
- Joel Muepo
- Vuong Nguyen
- Christopher Nolen
- Dominique Oakley
- Ra’JahNae Patterson
- Destiny Polian
- Mayumi Rhone
- Mary Runkle
- Lynette Shigg
- Nabachwa Ssensalo
- Jamal Story
- Haniyyah Tahirah
- Jeremiah Tatum
- Ramon Thielen
- Michael Tomlin III
- Jack Virga-Hall
- Tamica Washington-Miller
- Robert Wherry
- Janay Wiggins
- April Wilkins
