= Josephine Dibble Murphy =

American educator, community leader and activist

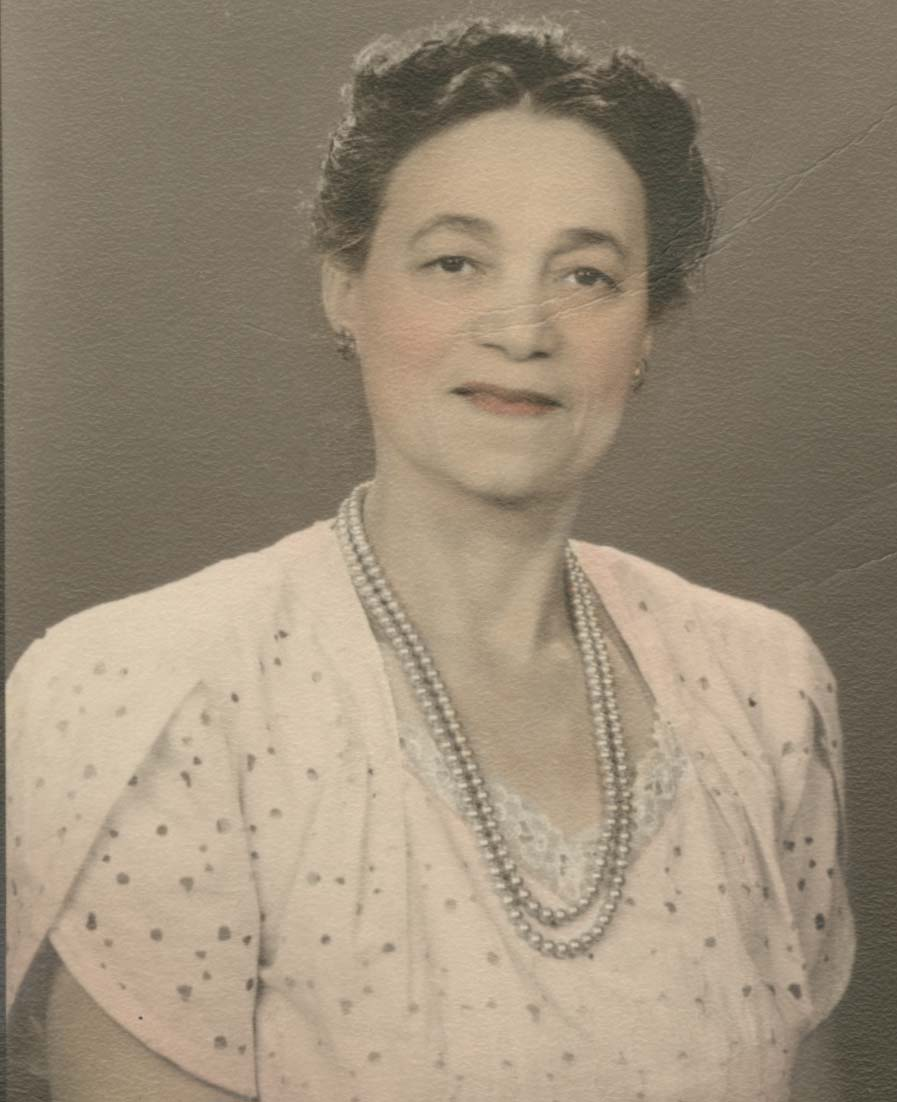
- Born: July 31, 1888; Camden, South Carolina, U.S.
- Died: October, 1974; Atlanta, Georgia, U.S.
- Occupations: Activist, Educator, Scholar
- Spouse: Harry S. Murphy
- Children: Doris Murphy Coates; Sarah Murphy Lemon Palmore; Mabel Murphy Smythe Haith; Harry Sanders Murphy Jr
- Parents: Eugene Dibble (father); Sallie Rebecca Lee Dibble (mother)

Josephine Dibble Murphy (July 31, 1888 - October 1974) was an American educator, community leader, and activist. She is best known for her exemplary community leadership in education and service, especially within the Atlanta branch of the Women's International League for Peace and Freedom, the NAACP, and the Atlanta University Alumni Association. Josephine believed, "If there is to be any future to peace in the world all races must learn to live together with mutual respect each for the other".

== Biography ==
=== Early life ===
Josephine Dibble Murphy was born on July 31, 1888, in Camden, South Carolina to Sallie Rebecca Lee Dibble and Eugene Dibble. She was one of three Dibble children. While in Camden, Murphy attended private institution, Boylan-Haven-Mather Academy. Josephine later went on to pursue higher education at Clark Atlanta University in Atlanta, Georgia. She graduated from the university in 1909 with a degree in education.

=== Family life ===
Following her collegiate experience, Murphy married Harry Sanders Murphy, a student at the University of Wisconsin. Josephine and Harry later moved to Atlanta during the beginning of the 1920s. While in Atlanta, Harry founded The House of Murphy, a printing business. The two would later go on to have four children: Doris, Sarah, Mabel, and Harry Jr.

=== Work and activism ===
Josephine was known for being inviting and intelligent. Many, including her parents, often remarked on her character. She was described as being one with a "calm and warm attitude" by Emily Calhoun of the Atlanta Friends Meeting Quaker organization. Josephine held various positions in organizations and institutions. Some of these institutions include, but are not limited to Atlanta University, The Atlanta University Alumni Association, The Women's International League for Peace and Freedom, Fort Valley State University and many others.

At Atlanta University, Murphy served as Hostess to Diplomat. In this role, she met an array of visitors from across the globe. Some of these noble visitors included W. E. B. Du Bois, Patrice Lumumba (Prime Minister of the Congo), Ruth Boozer (wife of Jack Boozer), Eleanor Roosevelt and many more. Within her twenty-year work with Atlanta University, Murphy also worked inside of dormitories. At Fort Valley State University, Murphy served as Counselor of Women. Murphy also served as the head of the home economics department at Miles College.

Murphy is credited with helping to found a local chapter of the Women's International League for Peace and Freedom, a non-profit organization determined to unite women. The Women's International League for Peace and Freedom originated in 1915 in the midst of the first World War, with Jane Addams as its first president. Throughout its history it has maintained a policy and program consistent with its purpose to work by non-violent means for the establishment throughout the world of those political, economic, social and psychological conditions which can assure peace and freedom.

=== Experiences abroad ===
Murphy utilized her love for education and justice across the globe. Her membership in her local chapter of the Women's International League for Peace and Freedom gave her an abundance of opportunities to travel and teach abroad. She traveled to Copenhagen, Denmark, Moscow, Israel, Sweden. While in Stockholm, Sweden, Murphy had the pleasure of representing her chapter at the WILFPAF headquarters.

=== Awards ===
- NAACP Honor Certificate for Atlanta University Alumni Association [1956]
- Atlanta University Alumni Association NAACP Lifetime Membership Plaque [1959]
- Atlanta University Centennial Certificate [1965]

=== Death ===
Josephine Dibble Murphy died in October 1974.
