= Claire Haywood =

American ballet teacher

- Haywood in 1948
- Born: Claire Helen Haywood; May 23, 1916; Atlanta, Georgia
- Died: September 23, 1978 (aged 62)
- Education: Spelman College; Howard University
- Occupation: Ballet teacher
- Organization(s): Jones-Haywood School of Ballet; Capitol Ballet Company

Claire Helen Haywood (1916 – September 23, 1978) was an American ballet dancer and teacher, called a "grand dame of Black dance in Washington". With Doris W. Jones, she cofounded the Jones-Haywood School of Ballet in 1941 to allow African American students to study classical ballet. She also cofounded the Capitol Ballet Company and became its artistic director.

== Early life ==
Claire Helen Haywood was born in 1916 in Atlanta, Georgia. She earned a BA from Spelman College in 1932 and an MA from Howard University in 1936. She also completed work toward a PhD at Catholic University of America.

== Career ==
Haywood studied dance with Doris W. Jones and in 1940 persuaded Jones to move to Washington, D.C. In 1941, she and Jones founded what became the Jones-Haywood School of Ballet, initially occupying temporary wartime space, then moving to a clapboard house on Delafield Place, Northwest, with a house attached to the studio, which Jones and Haywood shared. Both women were African-American dancers themselves and their integrated school offered training in classical ballet to African-American students denied admission to white dance schools. In 1974 Haywood told a reporter, "Much talent has been thrown away over the years because the opportunities just weren't there." The article went on: "It was an earlier lack of opportunities that made teaching an obsession with both women." Among the students who thrived under their supervision at the Jones-Haywood School were eventual Broadway star Chita Rivera, Dutch National Ballet principal dancer Sylvester Campbell, choreographer Louis Johnson, and ballerina Sandra Fortune-Green. Haywood served as a teacher and then became co-director in 1950. She also cofounded the Capitol Ballet Company, and became its artistic director in 1961. Through the 1970s, School and Company were the only such institution for African American ballet dancers outside of Arthur Mitchell's Dance Theatre of Harlem.

Haywood was also a visual artist, exhibiting in Atlanta and Martha's Vineyard as well as D.C.

In 1976, Haywood and Jones were the subject of a documentary film called Artists of the Dance.

== Death ==
Claire Helen Haywood died on September 23, 1978. She was 62.
