= Francesca Harper =

American dancer and choreographer (born 1969)

Francesca Harper (born 1969) is an American dancer and choreographer.

== Early life, family and education ==
Harper is the daughter of dancer and educator Denise Jefferson who directed The Ailey School and her former husband, attorney and activist John Roy Harper II. She is the niece of Pulitzer Prize winning writer Margo Jefferson.

Harper was named a scholar of the arts in the Presidential Scholars Program in 1987. She studied at the School of American Ballet and the Joffrey Ballet School.

== Career ==
=== Dance career ===
Early in Harper's career she was a soloist with Dance Theater of Harlem. She was a principal dancer in William Forsythe's Ballet Frankfurt from 1994 to 1999. In 2005, she founded the non-profit dance company The Francesca Harper Project.

After deliberation by Robert Battle, artistic director of the Alvin Ailey American Dance Theater and Bennett Rink, Director of the Alvin Ailey Dance Foundation, Harper was named artistic director of The Alvin Ailey II Company in 2021.

=== Film work ===
Harper was a ballet consultant for the film Black Swan, and has appeared as a dancer in the television series Boardwalk Empire. She is currently engaged as an Executive Producer with Sony Pictures to develop a new project.

== Awards ==
Long Island University honored Harper with a Living History award during Black History Month in 2013.
