= Tapestry Dance Company =

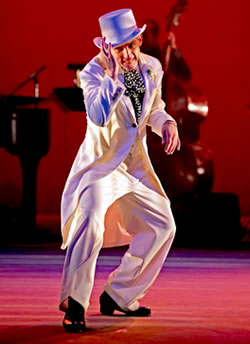
Jason Janas as John "Bubbles" Sublett in Tapestry Dance Company's production of The Souls of Our Feet.

The Tapestry Dance Company is a professional non-profit dance company in Austin, Texas. Founded in 1989 by rhythm tap dancer Acia Gray and ballet/jazz artist Deirdre Strand, the company performs repertoire from a variety of dance genres and often blends different types of dance within their choreography. Initially a performing company of three, the organization has since expanded to seven resident artists, a diversified administrative and production support staff and a pre-professional and adult training facility. Tapestry Dance Company is supported by numerous organizations including the Texas Commission on the Arts and the National Endowment of the Arts. It is the only full-time professional dance company in the world that specializes in rhythm tap dance. It also hosts the Annual Soul to Sole International Tap Festival, one of the oldest international tap festivals.
