= Joan Myers Brown =

American dance instructor

- Born: December 25, 1931 (age 94); Philadelphia, Pennsylvania, US
- Occupations: Director, educator, dancer
- Years active: 1970-
- Awards: National Medal of Arts

Joan Myers Brown (born 25 December 1931) is an American dance company director and former dancer. In 1970, she founded PHILADANCO, a modern dance company in Philadelphia. In 2012, she received a National Medal of Arts in recognition of her career.

== Early life and education ==
Brown is the only child of Nellie Lewis, a nuclear scientist, and Julius Myers, a chef and restaurateur, born on 25 December 1931 in Philadelphia. Native to both Philadelphia and North Carolina, she grew up mainly on 47th Street and Paschall Avenue of Southwest Philadelphia.

Brown's first dance instructors and role models were Essie Marie Dorsey, Sydney Gibson King, and Marion Durham Cuyjet. As a child she wished to shatter the social barriers prohibiting African Americans from becoming famous in the world of dance.

During a time where famous dance personalities were predominantly light-skinned, Brown worked hard to make sure that people of color acquired equal status in mainstream dance. She dreamed of a school where African Americans could learn and develop through methods tailored specifically to their individual needs - a program that was specially created for ethnic bodies.

== Accomplishments ==
Brown's accomplishments were many:

- 1960: Established The Philadelphia School of Dance Arts
- 1970: Founded The Philadelphia Dance Company (more commonly known as Philadanco)
- 1988: Founded the International Conference of Black Dance Companies
- 1991: Created the International Association of Blacks in Dance (IABD)
- 1995–: Distinguished guest, dance faculty at Howard University

== Recognition ==
- Honored in "Dance Women; Living Legends", a tribute to African American pioneer women of modern dance
- 2009 -- The Philadelphia Award, an annual award given to "a citizen of the Philadelphia region who, during the preceding year, acted and served on behalf of the best interests of the community."
- 2012 -- National Medal of Arts, presented by President Barack Obama and First Lady Michelle Obama, in the White House's East Room, on Wednesday, July 10, 2013.
