= Doris W. Jones =

Black ballet dancer

Doris Winnefred Jones (June 3, 1913 – March 21, 2006) was an American ballet dancer and dance instructor, known for founding the Jones-Haywood School of Ballet in 1941 with Claire Haywood.

== Life and career ==
Doris Winnefred Jones was born on June 3, 1913, in Malden, Massachusetts, to Maddie Lightfoot Jones and Walter James Jones. She wanted to become a ballet dancer, even though she had never met a black ballet dancer and many studios refused to teach her. However, some let her watch the classes, and from then on she taught herself through observation and books. Soon, she began to teach others and founded a ballet school in 1933. Jones founded the Jones-Haywood School of Ballet in 1941 with Claire Haywood in Washington, D.C., to allow African-American students to learn classical dance. In 1961, Jones and Haywood founded the Capitol Ballet Company as an extension of their school. The Capitol Ballet Company was the leading Jones, who invited Keith Lee, the first African-American principal male dancer at the American Ballet Theatre, to be a guest teacher at the company, which he accepted. Lee later revived the school in 1988, after it closed in 1985 due to lack of funds.

Famous pupils of Jones include Chita Rivera, Sylvester Campbell, Sandra Fortune, and Louis Johnson.

Jones died on March 21, 2006, in Washington, D.C.
