= The Philadelphia Dance Company =

Pennsylvania-based dance company

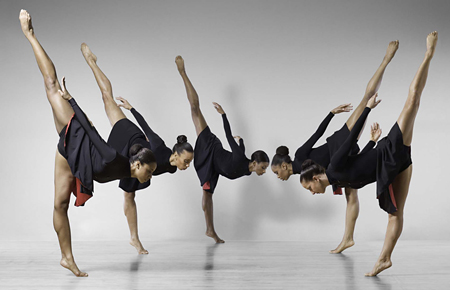
The Philadelphia Dance Company performs Enemy Behind the Gates by Christopher Huggins. From left to right are dancers Teneise Mitchell, Mora Amina Parker, Erin Barnett, Erin Moore, and Tracy Vog.

The Philadelphia Dance Company (also known as Philadanco) is a professional dance company based in Philadelphia, Pennsylvania, that specializes in contemporary dance. The organization was founded in 1970 by artistic director Joan Myers Brown. The company tours both nationally and internationally, in addition to their regular appearances locally at the Kimmel Center for the Performing Arts, the Painted Bride Art Center, and other venues in the Philadelphia area.

== History ==
The Philadelphia Dance Company (Philadanco) was founded by Joan Myers Brown in 1970 to provide a dance institution for African American students who were not welcomed by other schools and dance academies.

== Divisions ==
Philadanco conducts programs that are divided into four main components: the professional company, D/2 Apprentice Company, an Instruction and Training Program, and a Summer Training Program.

=== Professional Company ===
The professional company of Philadanco is an internationally recognized modern dance company. The company provides many performances throughout the year via domestic and international tours, and at their home theater, Philadelphia's Kimmel Center for the Performing Arts, during the months of fall and spring. Philadanco also established the International Association of Blacks in Dance (IABD), an organization that allows the black dance community to address common issues, pool their resources, and establish collaborations which result in beneficial advancements to the dance community as a whole.

=== D/2 ===
D/2 is the apprentice training company for Philadanco's professional company. It provides experience opportunities for young dancers who are not prepared to make the full transition to the world of professional dance. D/2 is under the instruction of Donald T. Lunsford, and when smaller organizations request a Philadanco performance, D/2 is able to fill the void that might have been left due to the professional company's hectic performance schedule.

=== Instruction and Training Program ===
Philadanco's Instruction and Training Program is a forty-week experience, during which members attend classes with nationally recognized dance instructors. This program is the foundation of Philadanco's structure as it allows the young people of Philadelphia early and intense exposure to dance in the hopes that their talents will serve to raise the caliber of Philadanco's future apprentice and professional companies. Students receive training in numerous styles of dance including: ballet, jazz, African, tap, and specific modern techniques such as established by Katherine Dunham and Lester Horton. Their annual concert, “Danco on Danco” allows the students to demonstrate their dance and choreographic skills acquired through the Instruction and Training Program.

=== Summer Training Program ===
During the summer season, Philadanco shifts its attention towards nurturing the younger student demographic, with a view to their eventual enrolment in the Instruction and Training Program. Notably, students in the Instruction and Training Program often engage in both avenues of study, but the summer program serves as an immersive "crash-course," allowing students to gain an experiential understanding of the challenges and demands of a dancer's lifestyle. The summer program includes training in the three fundamental dance styles of ballet, jazz, and modern, thereby providing students with a comprehensive foundation in the core genres of dance.

== Repertory (Repertoire) ==
Philadanco's repertory includes numerous works from pioneers of modern dance such as Christopher Huggins and Jawole Willa Jo Zollar. Below is a list of the pieces currently included in Philadanco's repertory:

- Back to Bach, by Eleo Pomare
- Ballet: The Blues and the Bible – Genesis, by Geoffrey Holder
- Between Earth and Home, by Jawole Willa Jo Zollar
- Blue, by Christopher L. Huggins
- Circular Ruins, by Elisa Monte
- Echoes: A Celebration of Alvin Ailey, by Milton Myers
- Elegy by Gene Hill Sagan
- Enemy Behind the Gates, Christopher Huggins
- Everything is Everything, by Lynne Taylor-Corbett
- For Mother, by Ronald K. Brown
- Forces of Rhythm, by Louis Johnson
- Gate Keepers, by Ronald K. Brown
- Hand Singing Songs, by Jawole Willa Jo Zollar
- Labess II, by David Brown
- My Science, by Bebe Miller
- Natural Flirt, by Trey McIntyre
- Steal Away, by Alonzo King
- Sweet in the Mornin, by Leni Wylliams
- Temple of my Listening, Eva M. Gholson
- Trance Atlantic, by Walter Nicks
- Xmas Philes, by Daniel Ezralow

== Dancers ==
- Ja'Vonna Blake
- Elyse Browning
- Edward Gillis
- Allan Harmon
- Joy Heller
- Catherine Kreide
- Marlean Post
- Jasmine Powell
- Monica Rhea
- Anthony Silver
- Subira Taylor
- Kendal Williams
- Jeroboam Bozeman

== Community Outreach ==
In addition to providing dance education, Philadanco is an active participant in the arts community and a strong supporter of arts education. A few of the company's more notable accomplishments include

- Establishment of the International Association of Blacks in Dance (IABD).
- Being the pilot dance company to participate in the state of Pennsylvania's Comprehensive Education Training Act to create an arts training program.
- Providing an extension of The Philadelphia School of Dance Arts, and providing underprivileged dancers with opportunities for scholarships and work-study programs to ensure arts education to all.
