= Paul Hernandez =

Paul Hernandez may refer to:

- Paul Hernandez (activist)
- Paul Hernandez (musician)
