= Louis René Barrera Indiangrass Wildlife Sanctuary =

Protected area in Austin, Texas

- Indiangrass Wildlife Sanctuary
- IUCN category V (protected landscape/seascape)
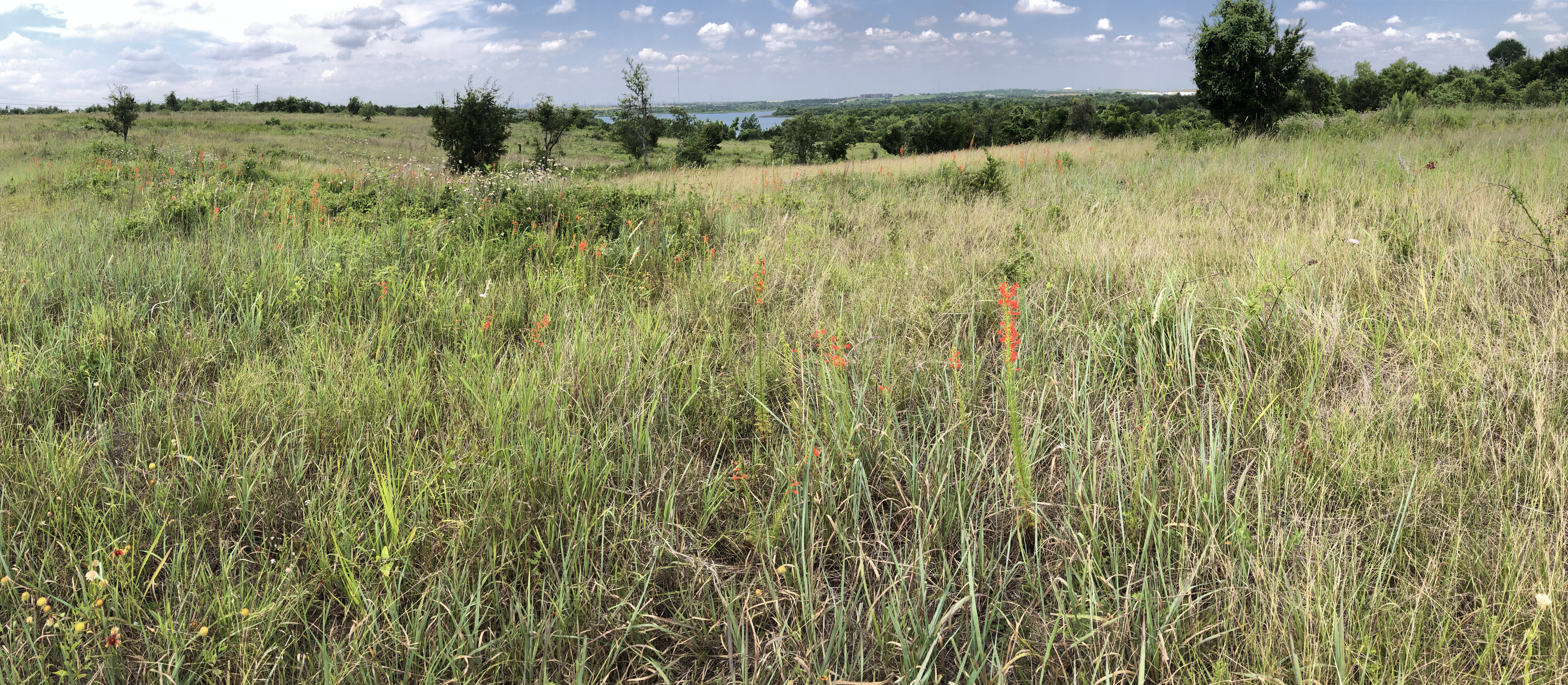

- Location within Texas Location within the United States
- Location: Lake Walter E. Long
- Nearest city: Austin, Texas
- Coordinates: 30°19′03″N 97°35′33″W
- Area: 1.14 km^{2} (0.44 sq mi)
- Elevation: 591.1 ft (180.2 m)
- Max. elevation: 195.68 m
- Min. elevation: 169 m
- Dimensions: 281 acres
- Designation: National
- Created: 1967
- Named for: Louis René Barrera
- Administrator: Austin Parks and Recreation Department
- Website: Official website

The Louis René Barrera Indiangrass Wildlife Sanctuary is a 281 acres (114 ha) preserved wildlife sanctuary in northeast Austin, Texas, on the north shore of Lake Walter E. Long. Created in 1967 as part of Austin's network of conservation lands, it focuses on conserving native grasslands and wildlife while promoting the restoration of the Blackland Prairie. The Blackland Prairie ecoregion, one of the most threatened ecosystems in Texas, has less than 1% of its original area remaining because that rest was converted to row crops and pasture by European settlers.

== Location ==
The sanctuary is located approximately 11 miles east of downtown Austin, Texas (TX 78724), on the north shore of Lake Walter E. Long and it's accessible through Blue Bluff Road and Lindell Lane.

The sanctuary is part of the larger Decker Tallgrass Prairie Preserve, a protected area known for its diverse ecosystems including grasslands, wetlands, and woodlands. These areas support a wide variety of native Texas plant and animal species and play a crucial role in preserving Texas' ecological legacy. The sanctuary is currently not open to the public and only accessible through guided tours.

== History ==
The Louis René Barrera Indiangrass Wildlife Sanctuary is a special part of Austin's work to protect its natural areas. It is similar to the Indiangrass Preserve, a 22 acres (8.9 ha) wetlands and 31 acres (13 ha) grasslands restoration project in the Katy Prairie, which was completed in 2014 by the Coastal Prairie Conservancy.

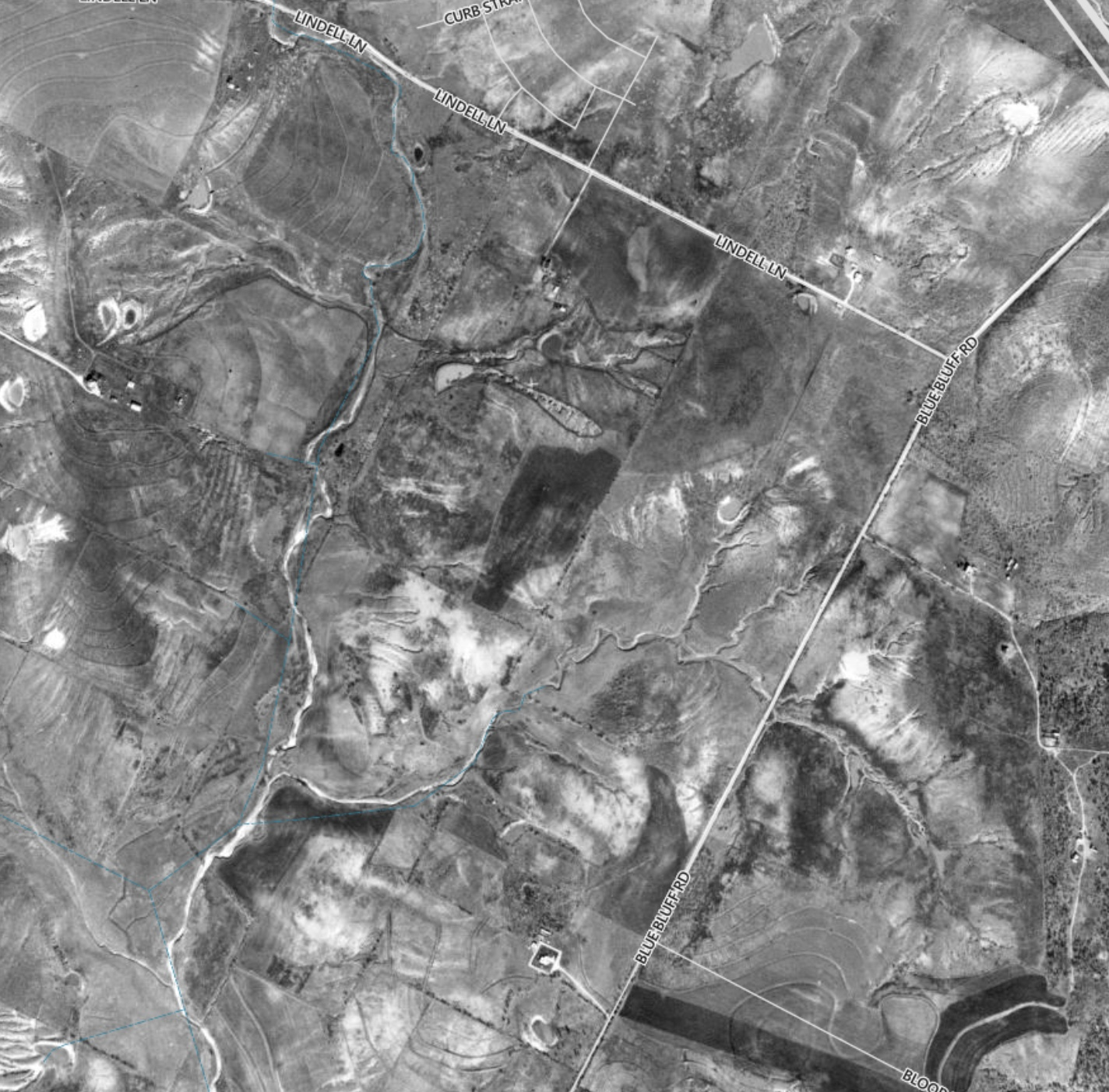
1958 Black and White Imagery of the Louis René Barrera Indiangrass Wildlife Sanctuary prior to the creation of Lake Walter E. Long

In 1966, the City of Austin expanded its steam turbine plant along Decker Road, which needed a steady water supply. To provide this, a new lake was created and filled with water in early 1967. The area around the lake was then set aside for parks and nature.

Over the years, the city developed multiple plans for the land, starting with the 1966 Decker Lake plan, followed by the 1968 Land Use Plan, and others in the 1970s. These plans included ideas for nature preserves and park facilities. However, the focus later shifted more toward conservation. This led to the creation of the Indiangrass Wildlife Sanctuary, later renamed after Louis René Barrera, who was a strong advocate for protecting nature and teaching people about the environment.

Today, the sanctuary plays an important role in conserving local wildlife and plants. It uses methods like controlled burns and removing invasive species to maintain a healthy habitat.

=== Commemoration and renaming of the Indiangrass Wildlife Sanctuary ===
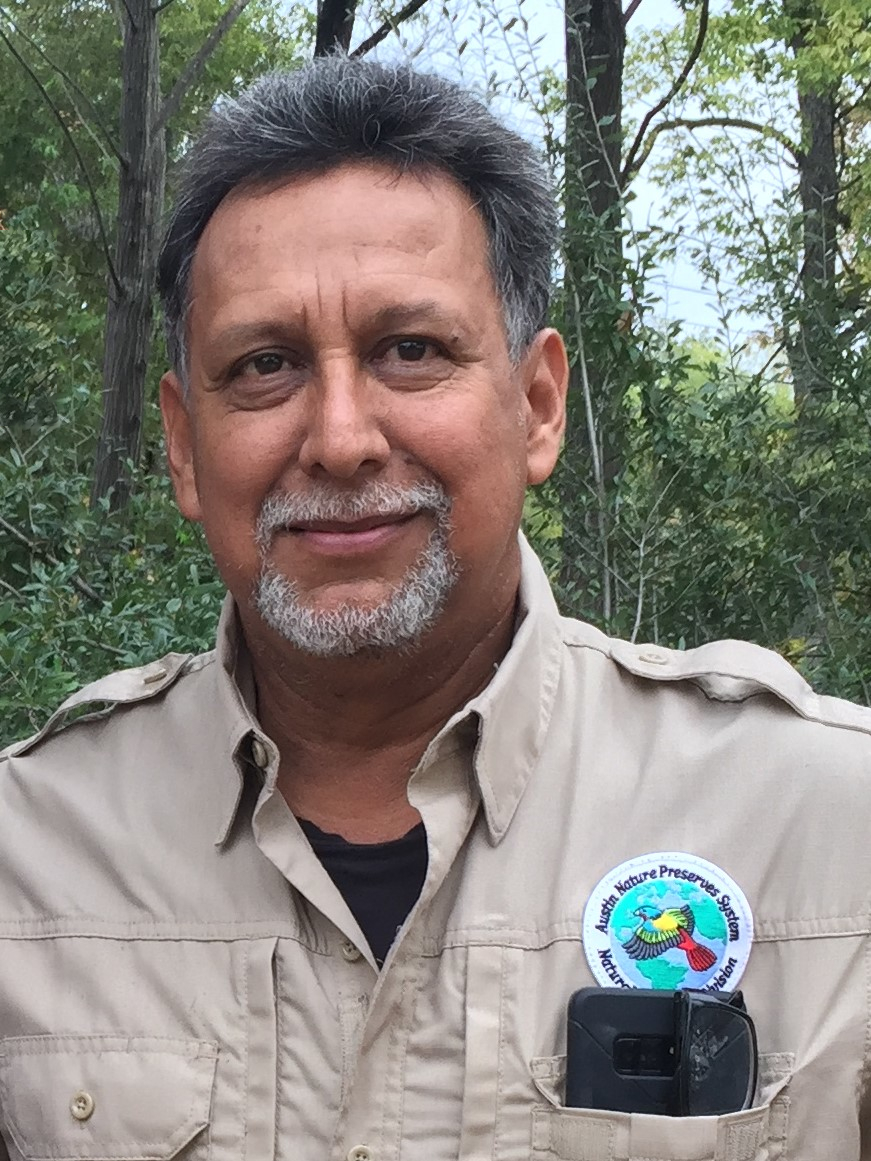
Portrait picture of Louis René Barrera in November 2017

From 1995 to 2018, Barrera served as an Environmental Conservation Information Specialist for the City of Austin. He was responsible for managing 2,200 acres (890 ha) across fifteen parcels of the City's Nature Preserve program. Throughout his career, he received numerous achievements, including the Keep America Beautiful National Award and the Keep Austin Beautiful Award.

He was known mainly for his commitment in preserving native habitats. One of his main objectives was to educate people about the importance of conserving the natural world.

In 2019, following Barrera's death, Austin's Mayor Steve Adler decided to honour Louis Renè Barrera's legacy by renaming the Indiangrass Wildlife Sanctuary after him.

Barrera was remembered as the "consummate land manager and conservationist " who demonstrated real passion for environmental stewardship. In 2005 an article from the Austin Chronicle praised him: " the city of Austin is home to roughly one gazillion waxleaf ligustrum plants, and only one René Barrera". His legacy continues throughout the work of his volunteers and colleagues, who keep his vision for natural preservation.

Today the sanctuary serves as both a memorial to Barrera's work and a living classroom where visitors can learn about preserving Texas' natural heritage. Through many conservation programs the sanctuary, thanks to the help of workers and volunteers, is able to keep his mission alive.

=== Conservation efforts ===
Conservation efforts include the implementation of Leave No Trace principles, which encourage visitors to respect wildlife habitats and leave natural areas undisturbed for future generations. By following these principles, visitors are encouraged to take only memories and leave no physical traces behind.

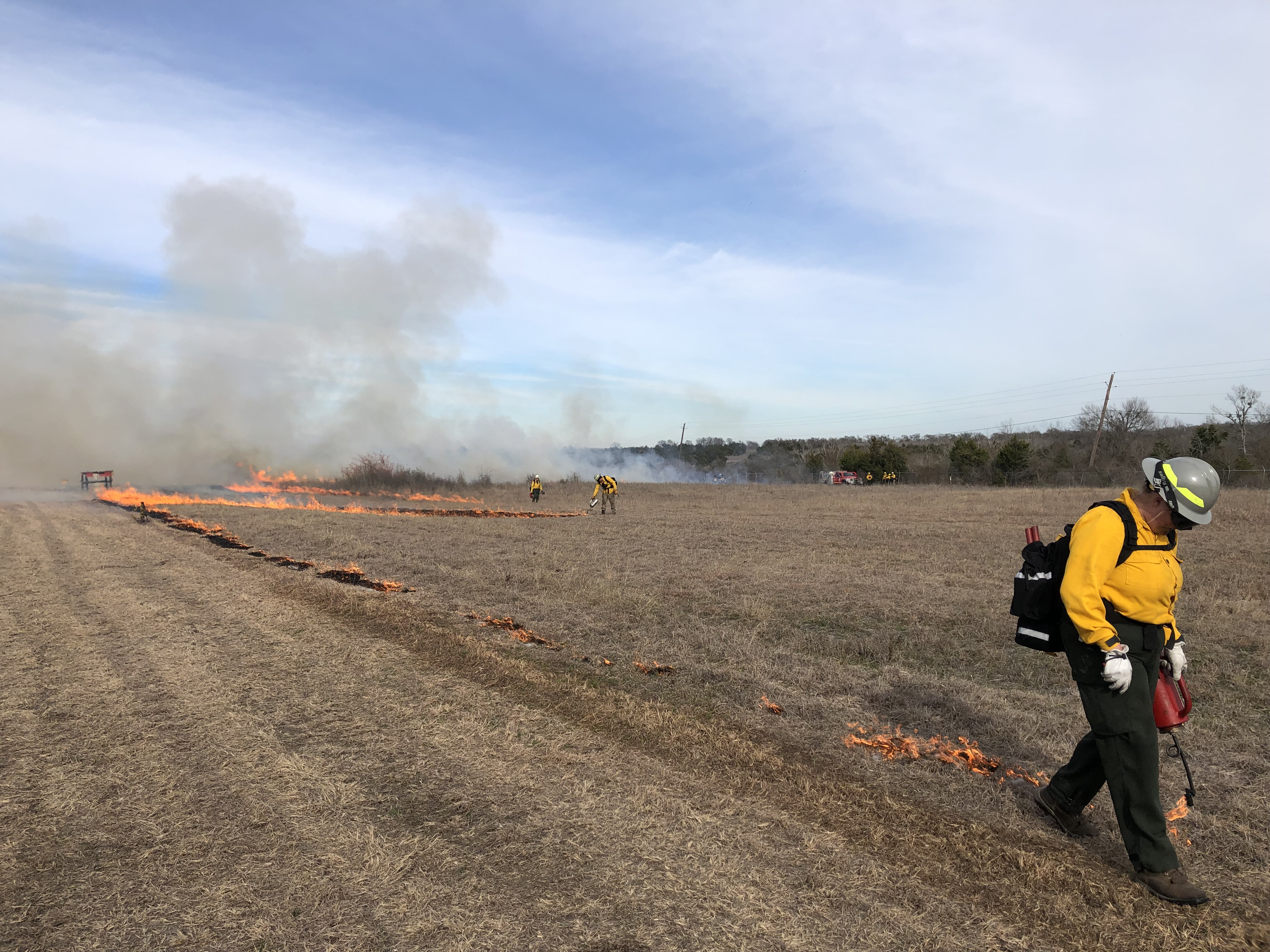
Firefighters carrying out the prescribed burn in Block M of the Louis René Barrera Indiangrass Wildlife Sanctuary

In the early 2000s, city planners recognized the need to protect this area from urban development in Austin. The sanctuary has become an important place for wildlife conservation. The Coastal Prairie Conservancy works to preserve coastal prairies, wetlands, farms, and ranches to benefit both people and wildlife, supporting the Indiangrass Wildlife Sanctuary's conservation efforts. The Conservancy's work in the Katy Prairie, including the Indiangrass Preserve, demonstrates the importance of preserving coastal prairie ecosystems and promoting environmental education.

In 2005, one key method used to maintain the area was controlled burns. In the early 2000s, the sanctuary faced threats from invasive species like Wax-leaf ligustrum. The Austin Parks and Recreation Department, removed these species and ensured proper disposal to protect the sanctuary. The sanctuary was recognized for these environmental efforts and received local awards.

The sanctuary preserve significant portions of Post Oak Savannah ecosystem, featuring live oak trees and native wildflowers. The area includes a Riparian Forest along Barton Creek, that provides habitat for bird species such as herons and hawks.

In 2020, the wildlife sanctuary received a $20,000 investment as part of the APF's (Austin Parks Foundation) efforts to continue the removal of invasive species, applications of herbicide and prescribed fire reduction in woody species.

In the winter of 2023, the PARD (Austin Parks and Recreation Department) conducted prescribed burns at the sanctuary as part of their own land management program. These events were implemented to develop climate resilience and reduce wildfire risks in the area. As of September 2024, PARD planned three additional prescribed burns covering 332 acres at the sanctuary.In addition, the Louis René Barrera Indiangrass Wildlife Sanctuary has been part of the Austin Parks and Recreation Department for already 53 years, and its main focus is restoring the Blackland Prairie ecosystem. Acquired in 1967 alongside the creation of the Walter E.Long reservoir, the sanctuary has since been directed by PARD stewards. Furthermore, it serves the community by hosting volunteer activities, educational events, and research projects.

In the early start of 2023, illegal dumping near the area of the sanctuary created environmental hazard. The staff and volunteers, led by the environmentalist Matt McCaw, were able to clean up the areas, to maintain a safe and welcoming environment for nature and people.

Looking ahead, the sanctuary plans to expand its conservation projects, including the introduction of native plant restoration programs, habitat enhancement for local wildlife, and partnerships with local schools and organizations to promote environmental education. The goal is to continue building on its success and ensure the sanctuary remains a big part of Austin's natural heritage for future generations.

== Geology ==
=== Soil profile ===
Louis René Barrera Indiangrass Wildlife Sanctuary Soil Analysis Map

The clay-rich soil allows plants to grow healthier and more vigorous, in fact it has excellent water retention properties. Meaning they can hold moisture for longer periods and therefore the plants don't require frequent irrigation, which is a fundamental aspect given the location of the sanctuary in central Texas. Clay-rich soil provides dense and stable fundations for plant growth, and the clay prevent soil erosion. During the wetter months, the soil may preserve more water and create temporary pools that can support and attract both birds and amphibians, while in the drier months the moisture is used to sustain the plants population of the sanctuary.

The sanctuary has four main soil series, which are divided into eight specific soil types. These series involve Burleson, Ferris, Heiden, and Houston Black. All of these series fall under the Vertisol soil order, that are commonly found in Texas Blackland Tallgrass Prairies. Vertisols contain a lot of clay and noticeably change in size as they expand and shrink, demonstrating how the soil moves. When they get wet, they swell up, slow water movement and they lose a small amount of nutrients. They are also naturally highly fertile. Vertisols turn very hard when dry and become clingy when wet. This can cause big problems to heavy machinery getting stuck in wet conditions, and making the planting process quite challenging, except during a brief window when the seasons shift from wet to dry.

The clay-rich soil at the sanctuary is able to support a thriving community of microorganisms. These small organisms break down organic material, releasing nutrients into the soil. The very fine texture of the soil holds important nutrients like nitrogen and phosphorus, which plants need to be able to grow. Although the soil's compactness limits root spread, native plants with deep roots are well-adapted to these conditions. The clay keeps the soil warm at night, which helps plant roots and seeds grow better. Its compact nature prevents water and nutrients from sinking too deep, keeping them close to plant roots.

Soil Types and Characteristics, Indiangrass Wildlife Sanctuary, 2024
Soil Type	Coverage	Acres	Slope (%)	Erosion Level
Houston Black gravelly clay (HoD2)	35.1%	112.6	2-8%	Moderate
Heiden gravelly clay (HgF2)	20.7%	66.6	8-20%	Moderate
Houston Black clay (HnB)	14.2%	45.5	1-5%	Moderate
Ferris-Heiden complex (FhF3)	12.4%	39.9	8-20%	Severe
Houston Black clay (HnC2)	6.3%	20.2	3-5%	Moderate
Heiden clay (HeC2)	2.1%	6.8	3-5%	Moderate
Heiden clay (HeD2)	1.8%	5.9	5-8%	Moderate
Burleson gravelly clay (BtB)	0.6%	2.0	1-3%	Minimal
Tinn clay (Tw)	0.8%	2.5	0-1%	Frequently flooded

== Climate ==
Located outside the city of Austin, the Indiangrass Wildlife Sanctuary sits between the dry deserts of the American Southwest and the humid regions of the Southeast. Therefore, the climate, topography and vegetation of that area have characteristics from both regions. According to the Köppen Climate Classification, the sanctuary has a humid subtropical climate, which is characterized by longer and hotter summers, and short mild winters. Spring and fall seasons can range from warm to hot. Throughout the year of 2023, the sanctuary experienced 532.9 mm of rainfall.

Although located inland from the coast, the sanctuary is still affected by extreme weather. Hurricanes and tropical storms can indirectly impact the Austin area, bringing high winds, flooding, and significant damage. In 1980 EF0, EF1 and EF2 tornadoes spawned by Hurricane Allen caused over $250 million in damages in the areas around Austin. Examples of heavy flooding due to tropical storms and hurricanes include Tropical Storm Hermine (2010) that caused 156,5 mm of rainfall in September alone, and Hurricane Harvey in 2017, which caused 292,4 mm of rainfall and led to record flooding in the areas it affected.

Additionally due to the sanctuary's location, it lies within the uttermost southern periphery area called Tornado Alley. Even if tornadoes strike this area less frequently than others located farther north. The area also experiences supercell thunderstorms multiple times per year, they bring heavy rain, strong winds, and floods.

=== Temperatures ===
Average monthly maximum and minimum temperature, Indiangrass Wildlife Sanctuary, 2023
	January	February	March	April	May	June	July	August	September	October	November	December
Average maximum temperature (°C)	18.95°	19.62°	23.61°	24.74°	29.01°	34.87°	37.67°	39.69°	35.97°	27.75°	20.14°	19.35°
Average minimum temperature (°C)	7.12°	7.0°	12.8°	13.88°	19.18°	23.39°	24.81°	25.11°	23.47°	16.34°	10.52°	6.88°

=== Impact of climate change on temperature trends (1979–2023) ===
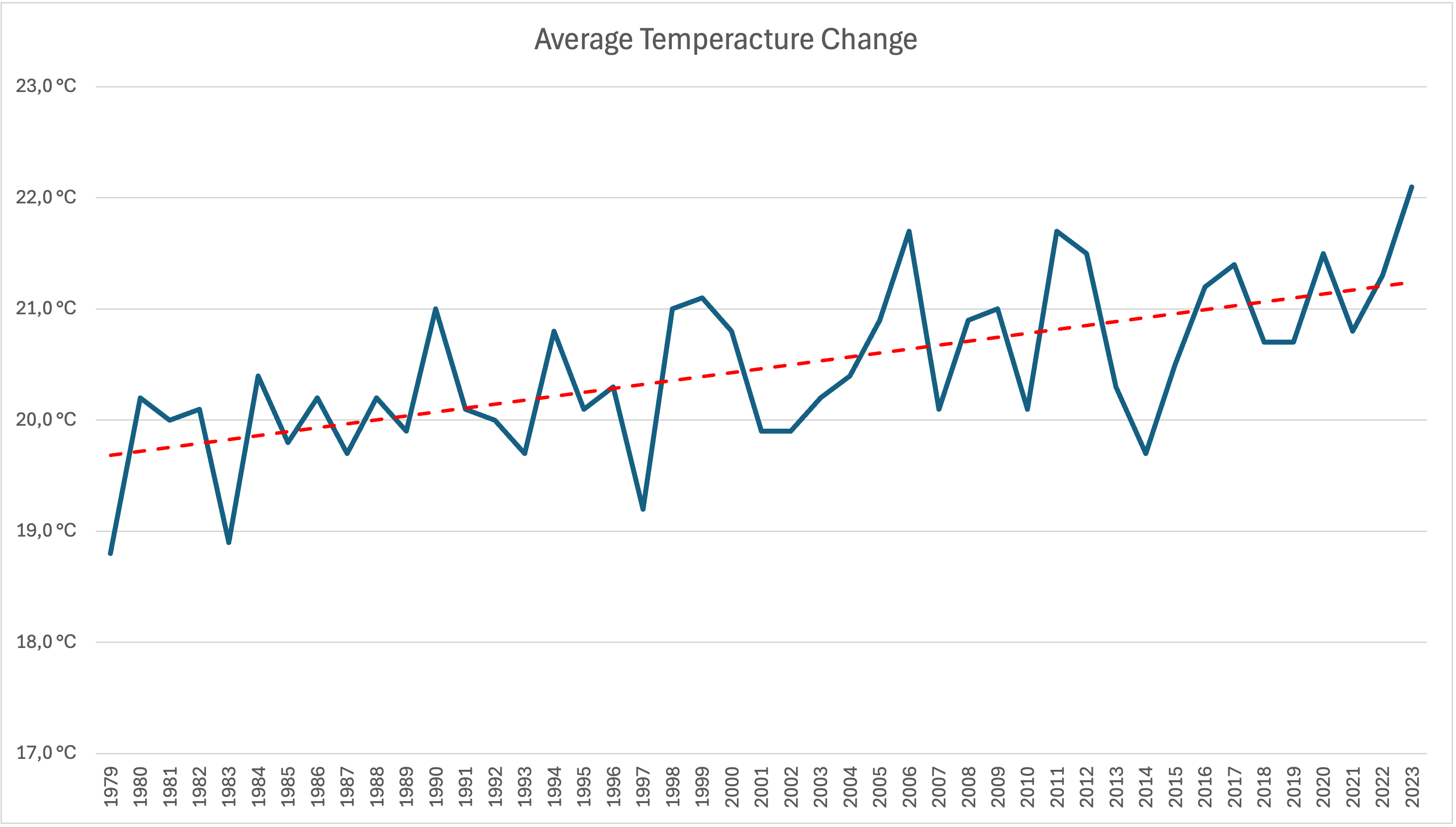
Annual temperature trend (1979–2023) in Louis René Barrera Indiangrass Wildlife Sanctuary showing climate change over time

The effect of climate change is also noticeable in the sanctuary. Average yearly temperature data recorded from 1979 until 2023 shows that the temperature in the areas in which the sanctuary is located has experiencing a steady increase in temperatures. The hottest year recorded was 2023, with an average temperature of 22.1 °C, while the coldest was 1979 with 18.8 °C. Over four decades, the average annual temperature has increased by 3.3°C.

Each decade, the sanctuary's average temperature rises by 0.35 °C, making climate change a serious issue for the sanctuary's well-being and its long-term sustainability.

=== Precipitations ===
Average monthly precipitation, Indiangrass Wildlife Sanctuary, 2023
	January	February	March	April	May	June	July	August	September	October	November	December
Precipitation (mm)	0.94	1.14	1.13	3.21	2.59	1.08	0.07	0.07	1.02	3.92	0.89	1.45

=== Humidity ===
Average monthly humidity, Indiangrass Wildlife Sanctuary, 2023
	January	February	March	April	May	June	July	August	September	October	November	December
Humidity	66.54%	69.69%	68.05%	73.9%	78.22%	69.68%	58.71%	50.88%	60.03%	66.96%	76.17%	67.82%

=== Wind speeds and direction ===
Average monthly wind speed ( km/h ), Indiangrass Wildlife Sanctuary, 2023
	January	February	March	April	May	June	July	August	September	October	November	December
Speed (km/h)	21.01	23.85	22.93	21.99	16.79	19.05	18.96	20.15	17.25	21.03	18.3	18.3

Average monthly wind gust speed ( km/h ). Indiangrass Wildlife Sanctuary. 2023
	January	February	March	April	May	June	July	August	September	October	November	December
Speed (km/h)	37.05	42.08	42.04	40.68	33.52	40.16	36.0	39.26	34.35	38.37	31.95	32.58

Average monthly wind direction ( ° ). Indiangrass Wildlife Sanctuary. 2023
	January	February	March	April	May	June	July	August	September	October	November	December
Direction	176.36°	205.42°	154.47°	124.37°	133.58°	152.81°	165.97°	144.2°	124.83°	139.25°	140.52°	204.15°

== Ecology ==
=== Flora ===
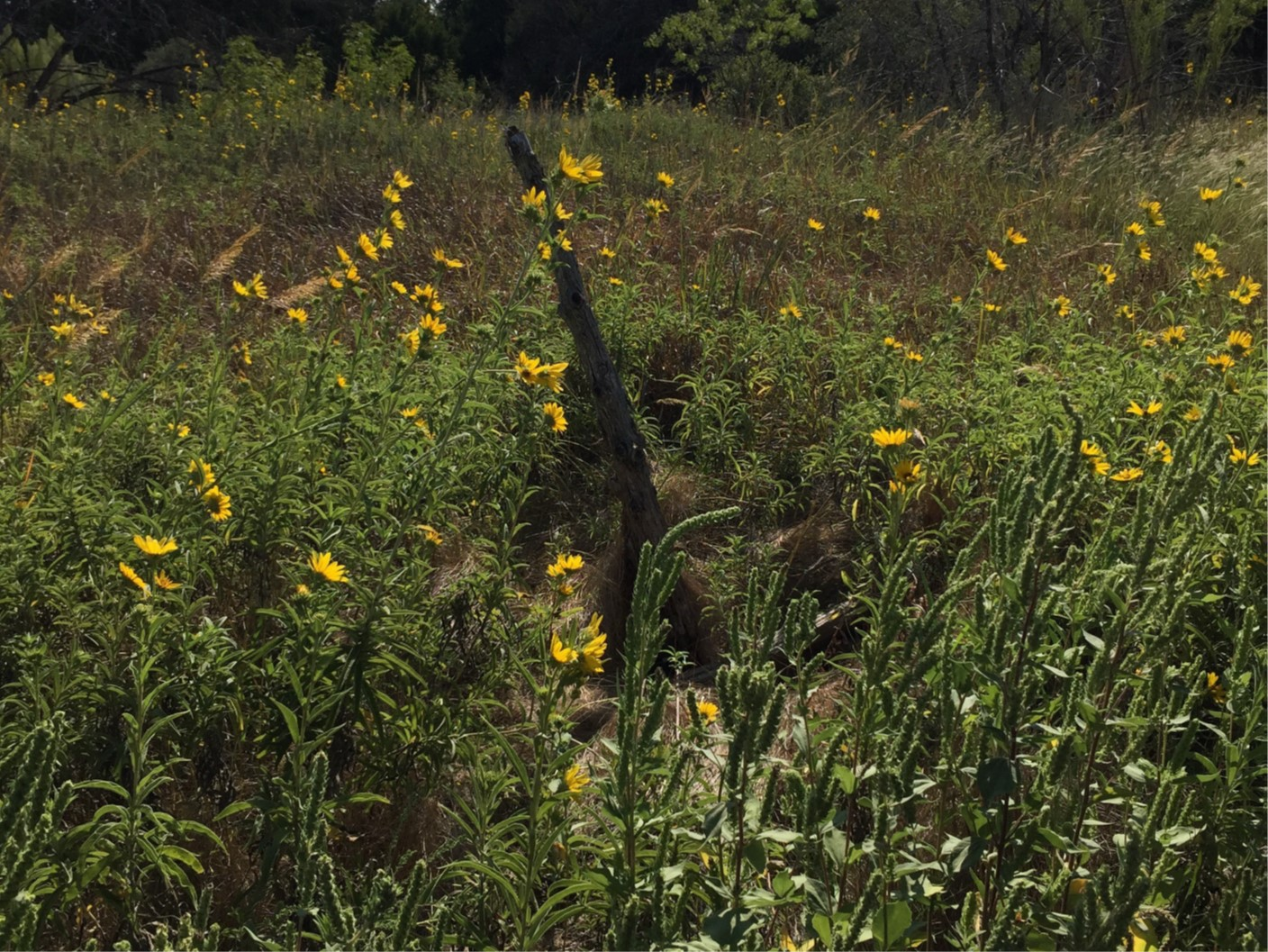
Maximilian sunflower growing in the nature of the Louis René Barrera Indiangrass Wildlife Sanctuary

Plant species within the sanctuary are documented on the iNaturalist platform by local naturalists and community members. These records contribute to the overall conservation efforts by providing essential data on species distribution, population health, and habitat health, aiding the sanctuary's conservation objectives. For instance, monitoring and analyzing data on rare and endangered species helps identify areas in need of additional protection. Sightings of flora come in a wide variety in the sanctuary such as Oenothera glaucifolia, Triadica sebifera and Euphorbia bicolor. Together, these records enhance conservation efforts, contributing to maintaining the sanctuary's biodiversity.

Invasive species management is a key focus of the sanctuary. The City of Austin's Park and Recreation Department has provided resources to define the impact of native flora and invasive plants. The sanctuary specifically targets invasive species as Triadica sebifera and Ligustrum sinense, which create threats to the native biodiversity. Efforts to control these species include manual removal, prescribed burns, and biological control. Effective management of these species of plants, is essential to maintain the ecological balance of the sanctuary.

Invasive Plants in the Sanctuary
Invasive Plant	Habit
Arundo	Grass
Bermudagrass	Grass
Dallisgrass	Grass
Japanese Brome	Grass
Johnsongrass	Grass
King Ranch Bluestem	Grass
Silky Bluestem	Grass
Vasey Grass	Grass
Hedge Parsley	Herbaceous
Chinese Privet	Shrub
Ligustrum	Shrub
Chinaberry	Tree
Chinese Tallow	Tree
Tree of Heaven	Tree
White Mulberry	Tree
Japanese Honeysuckle	Vine

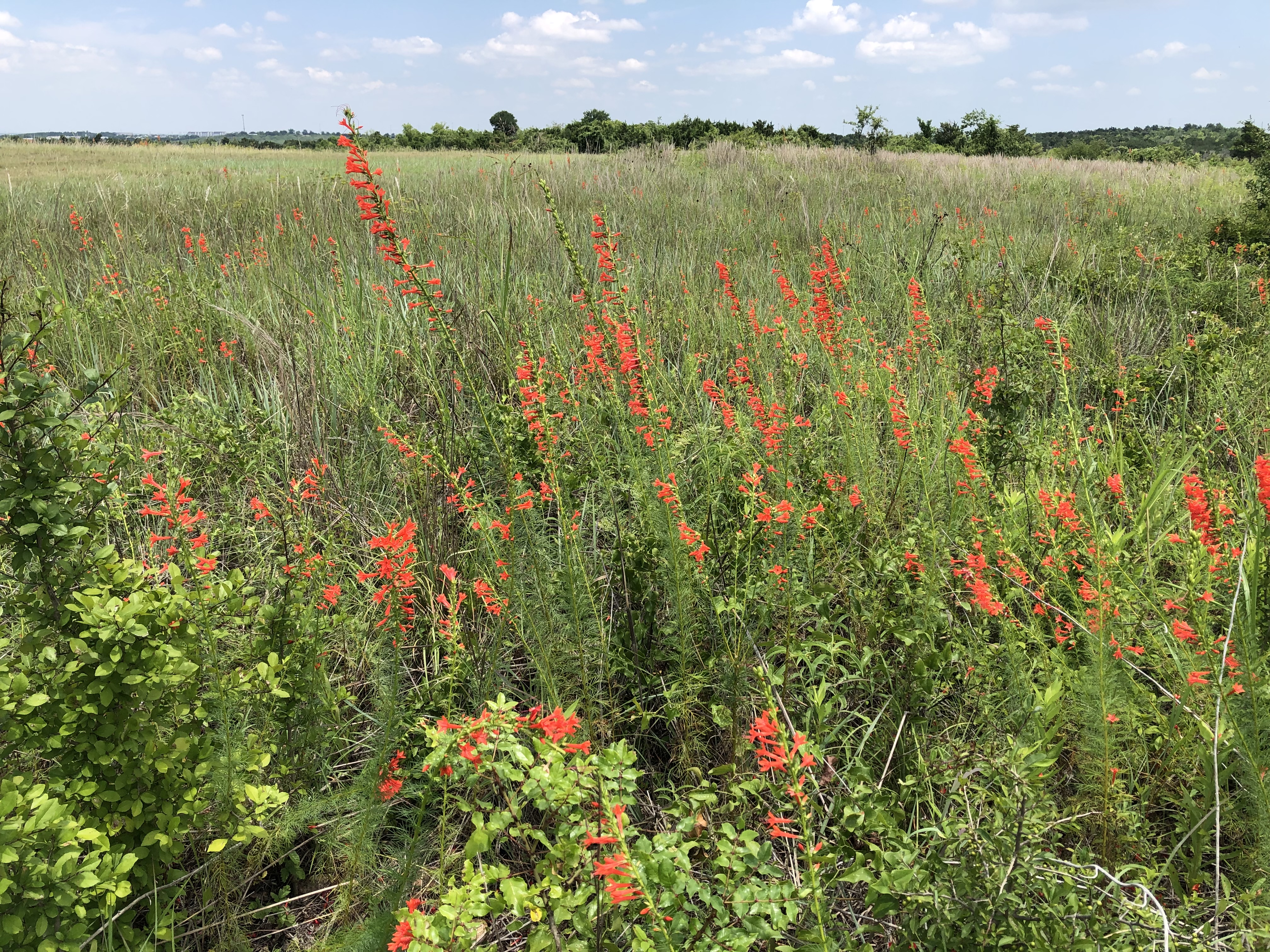
Group of standing cypresses growing in the Louis René Barrera Indiangrass Wildlife Sanctuary

Indiangrass (Sorghastrum nutans) is found in upland prairies, pastures, glades and it also grows in old fields. As a warm-season grass, it grows exponentially during the heat of summer unlike other grasses that prefer cooler seasons. This grass plays a key role in tallgrass prairies and glade ecosystems.

Restoring plants native to the Blackland Prairie ecoregion allows the sanctuary to positively impact nearby residents and site users. The restoration process helps native plants thrive, improving water quality, sequestering carbon emissions, reducing erosion, strengthening soil, mitigating flooding, and providing better habitats for wildlife.

==== Invasive species ====
The sanctuary has two invasive grass species, Bothriochloa ischaemum and Sorghum halepense. The advanced colonization of Bothriochloa ischaemum has been identified as impacting native biodiversity. Invasive species are non-native organisms that, when introduced, can cause serious damage to the environment, economy or human health. These species tend to spread rapidly and can displace native plants, disrupting natural ecosystems. For example, they can interfere with processes like fire patterns, nutrient cycling and water systems. On many occasions, plants invasions are driven by previous disturbances to the environment.

=== Fauna ===
The sanctuary supports rich variety of animals, from mammals and birds to insects and amphibians. Larger mammals that are commonly found in the grasslands are White-tailed deer, cottontail rabbits and red foxes. These species not only thrive within the sanctuary's habitats but also contribute to seed dispersal, supporting plant diversity. Throughout the sanctuary, there is a wide variety of smaller mammals, such as field mice, and voles. They prosper in the dense grasses and provide a crucial food source for birds of prey and predators. Numerous insects, like locusts and caterpillars consume indiangrass. These insects in turn become a vital food source for many species like birds and mammals. Due to its tall stature and upright growth, indiangrass offers excellent shelter for nesting, protection, and winter cover for various wildlife. During the summer, when the grass is green, livestock and bison favour it, as it provides a rich source of protein and vitamin A.

Birdlife is a big part of the sanctuary, among the bird species that inhabit the area are meadowlarks, grasshopper sparrows, and red-tailed hawks. During migration season, the area is home to a great deal of migratory birds, including American goldfinches and northern harriers, they use the sanctuary as stopover point. Waterfowl like great blue herons and mallards are also located in the area. The sanctuary also houses some amphibians such as leopard frogs and American toads. Conservation efforts have enhanced habitats for the migratory birds by native grass plantings and the installation of platforms and nest boxes for birds.

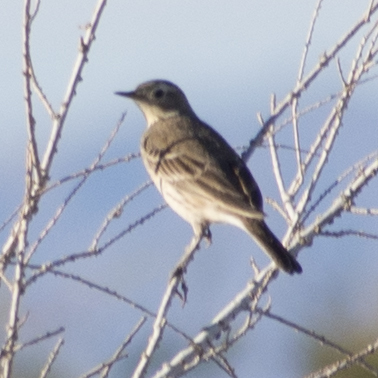
American Pipit on a tree branch

The eBird and iNaturalist databases have documented 148 bird species in the sanctuary since 1994, with the majority being recorded between 2018 and 2019. The Project Prairie Bird initiative, launched in winter 2018, has contributed to avian research by focusing on the grasland bird species and their habitats. Notable rare birds that have been recorded are American pipit, Baltimore oriole, least flycatcher, white-winged dove, least grebe, sedge wren, painted bunting, and Bell's vireo. The Project Priarie Bird initiative has recorded 6 bird species on site, including Le Conte's sparrow, Lincoln's sparrow, savannah sparrow, and the song sparrow, these species have experienced a decline due to habitat loss making these conservation efforts vital.

Insects play a crucial role in the sanctuary ecosystem, in particular there are pollinators such as bumblebees, monarch butterflies, and other bee and butterfly species. These pollinators are attracted to the sanctuary's diverse wildflowers, which can provide crucial nectar and pollen sources. By supporting the reproduction of flowering plants, they are able to support the ecological food chain, as these plants are able to feed mammals, birds and other species. Pollinators are vital for maintaining plant diversity, which in turn sustains a balanced and healthy ecosystem, highlighting the sanctuary's importance as a refuge for these critical species.

== Threats ==
=== Illegal dumping ===
Illegal dumping is one of the primary threats the Indiangrass Wildlife Sanctuary faces. Discarded household items, furniture, and construction materials are often found piled up just outside the sanctuary on Blue Bluff Road and surrounding roads. The waste is not only unsightly, but also presents serious risks to wildlife and the environment. This practice has far-reaching consequences, having an impact on both the animal and human habitat.

=== Droughts ===
Droughts are a significant threat to the Indian Wildlife Sanctuary and Texas. They can cause serious damage and create major problems to the entire ecosystem. Like in 2011, where droughts hugely affected the state's economy and people lives. Droughts are a constant problem in Texas. Long dry periods, like the 2011 drought, reduce water supplies, making it harder for plants and animals to survive. Clay-rich soil retains moisture well, but extreme droughts exceed its capacity, straining ecosystems.

=== Woody species encroachment ===
Woody plant encroachment is the process by which woody plant species progressively expand into areas that were previously treeless. At the Barrera Wildlife Sanctuary, changes in ecological management, including the absence of historic fire regimes and grazing animals, have contributed to an increase in woody plant species. This has led to the establishment of woodlands and shrublands across much of the preserve. Although native of that area, many wood species have become problematic, causing the canopy cover to go from a 10% to a current 20%, as determined using the normalized difference vegetation index (NDVI).

=== Soil disturbance and erosion ===
Erosion was observed along drainage areas, though its impacts are currently limited. Even if these concerns are not immediate priorities, increased runoff could exacerbate soil erosion and disturbance in the future, as site access and water flow patterns change due to nearby developments.

== Curiosities ==
=== Trekking trails ===
The sanctuary offers a number of trails with detailed maps, reviews and photos. According to the different levels of difficulty, the tracks adapt to several activities from hikes to family trips.

The Indiangrass Blioblitz Trail is a 1.1 km loop trail, which takes an average of 16 minutes to complete. It has a 20 m elevation gain and serves as a habitat restoration area. As the term Bioblitz suggests, the trails invites its visitors to find and identify as many species as possible.

Travis County Exposition Centre

Located near the Louis René Barrera Indiangrass Wildlife Sanctuary, the Travis Country Exposition Centre is a facility in the southwestern part of Walter E. Long Metropolitan Park. The venue is known for hosting events such as rodeos and agricultural fairs. However, the sanctuary itself remains a quiet haven, separated from the busy events of the Expo Center.

The Expo Center has seen minimal updates in recent years, and a 2016 study suggested over $500 million needed for renovations. With the lease expiring in 2033, the future of the Expo Center could bring several new potential developments.

Accessibility

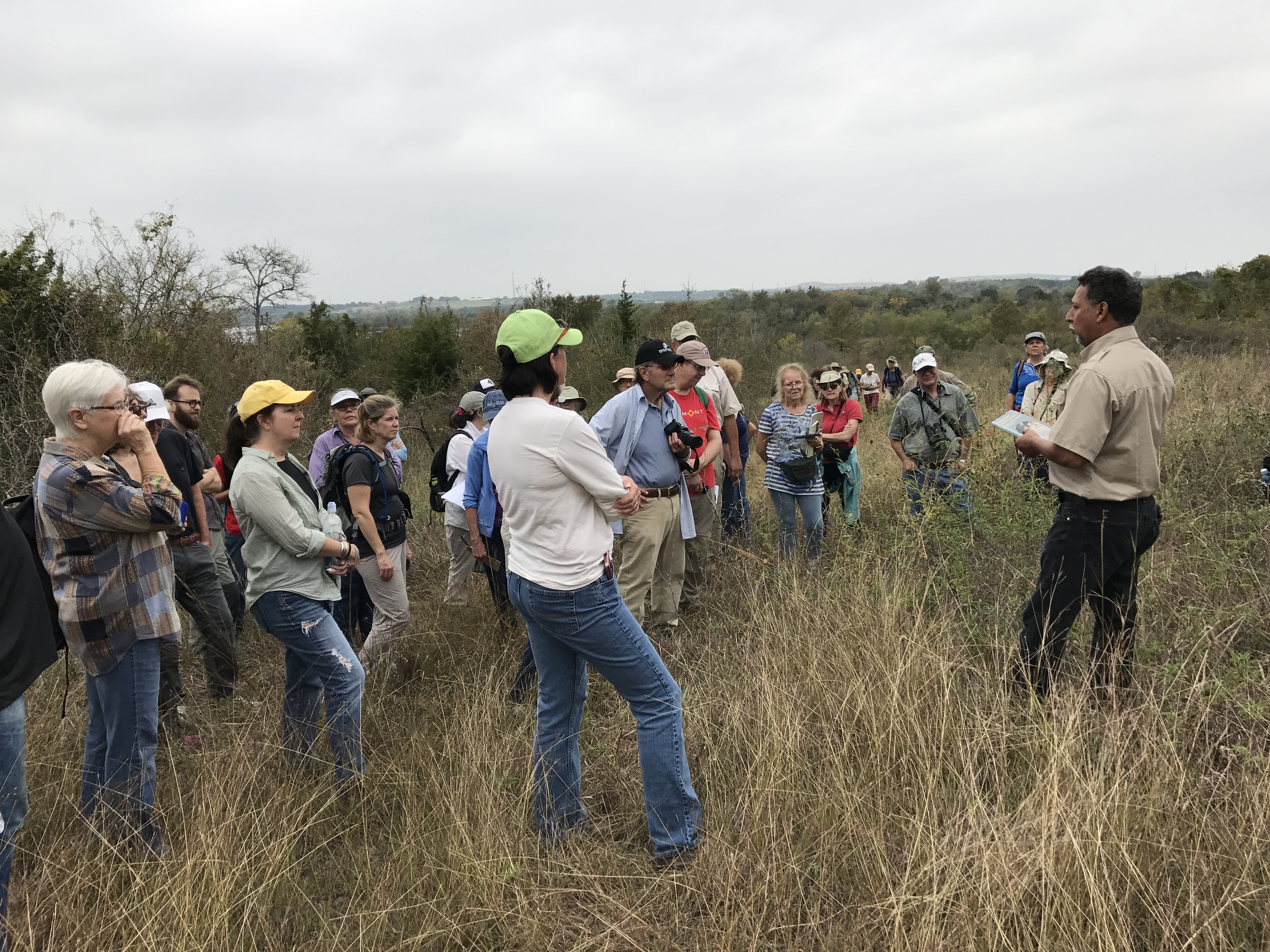
Louis René Barrera (on the right) giving a tour at the Indiangrass Wildlife Sanctuary

In order to manage access to the sanctuary and protect the environment, the park is currently not open to the public, but accessible only through guided tours. The Austin Parks and Recreation Department plans to open the sanctuary to the public for the first time in the future, creating buildings and trails. Potential entrance points to the sanctuary are being considered in the northeast and southeast corners of the preserve, though these locations are not yet finalized and may be subject to change. Additionally, plans include implementing trails that will connect the Walter E. Long Metropolitan Park to the sanctuary. An unpaved road in the eastern portion of this park provides access to the Louis René Barrera Indiangrass Wildlife Sanctuary.

== Gallery ==
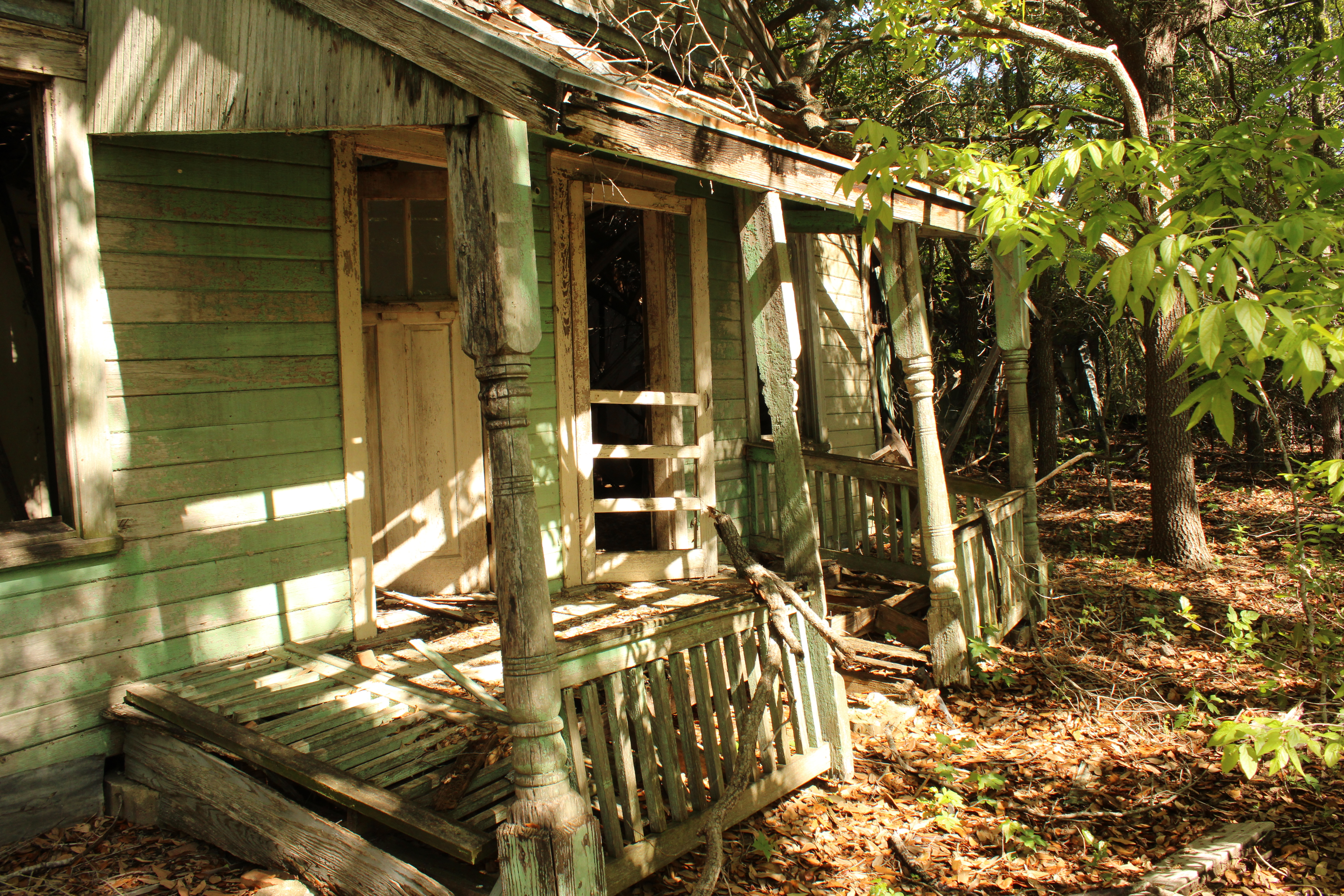
Abandoned house in the Louis René Barrera Indiangrass Wildlife Sanctuary

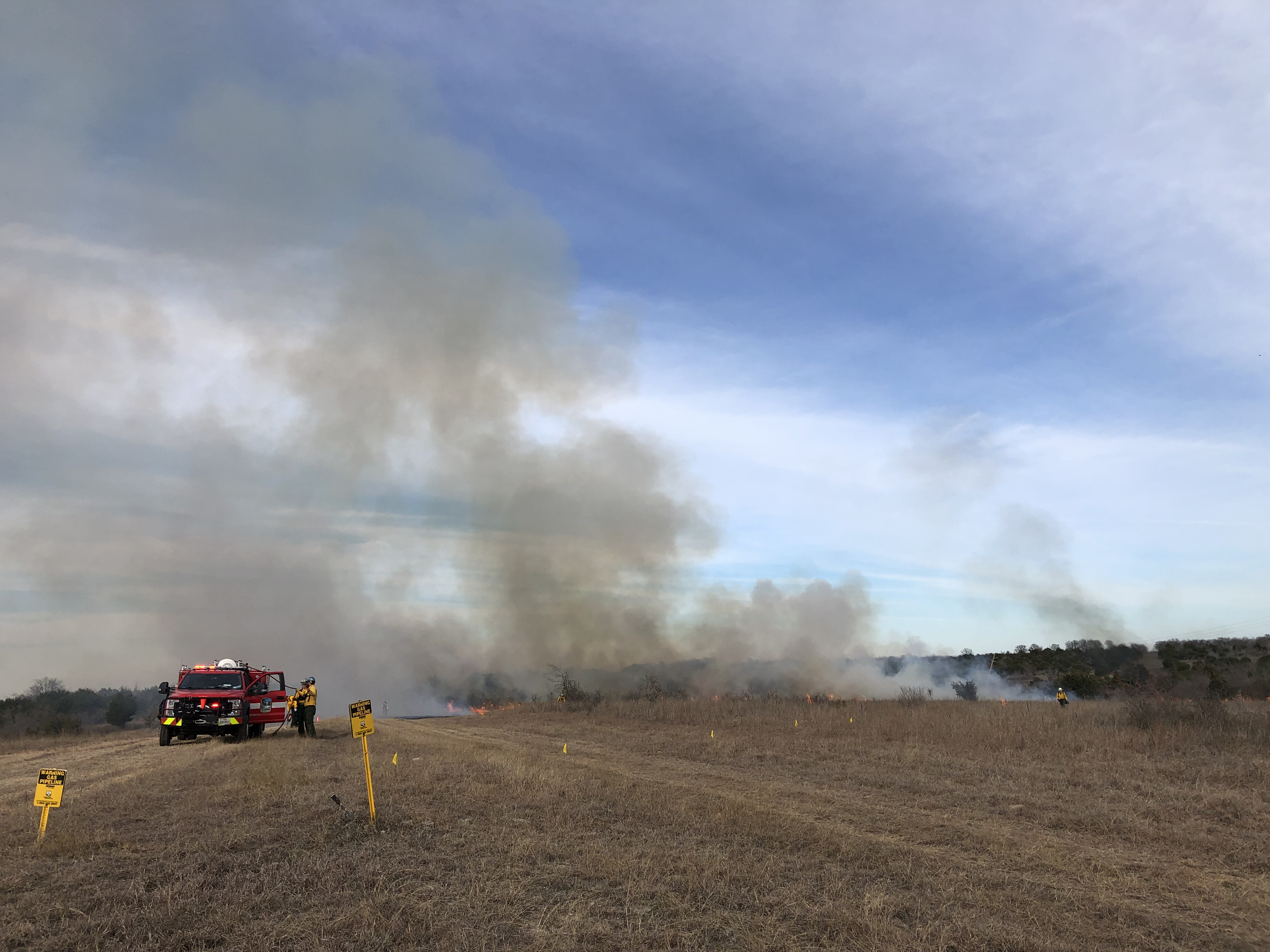
Prescribed burn performed in Block M of the Louis René Barrera Indiangrass Wildlife Sanctuary

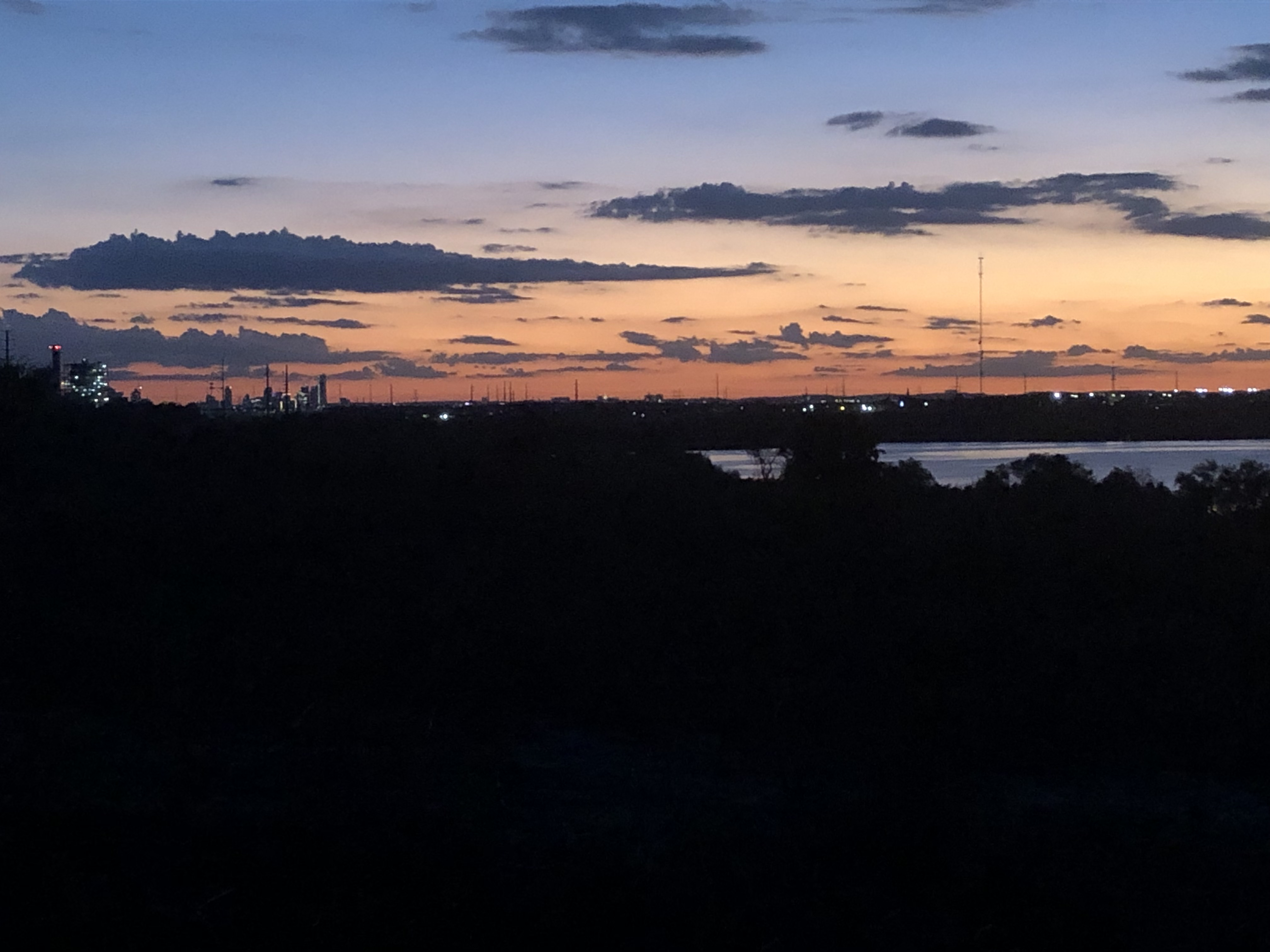
Lights of a nearby power plant visible from block G in the Louis René Barrera Indiangrass Wildlife Sanctuary

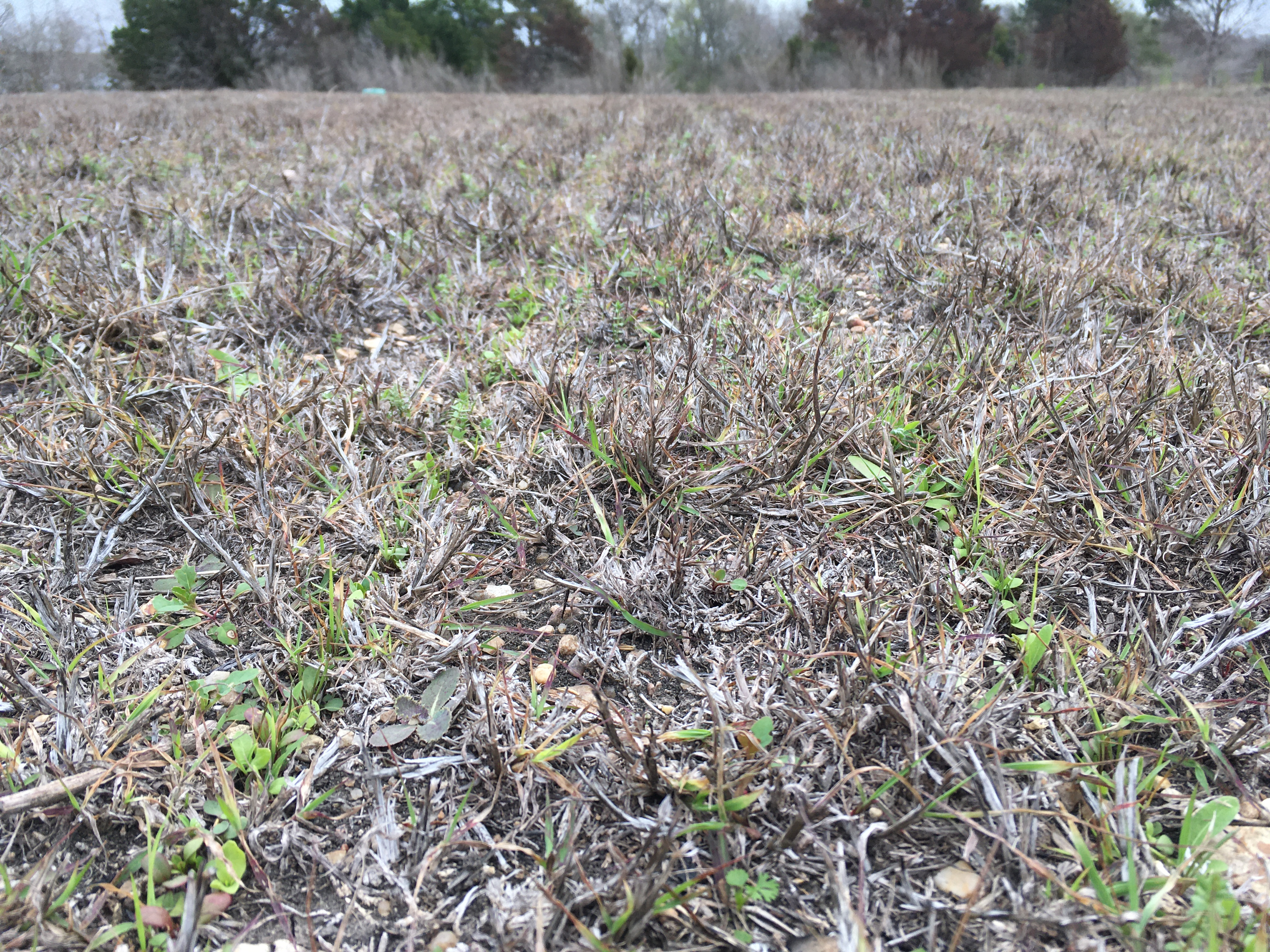
Seedlings growing in the Louis René Barrera Indiangrass Wildlife Sanctuary

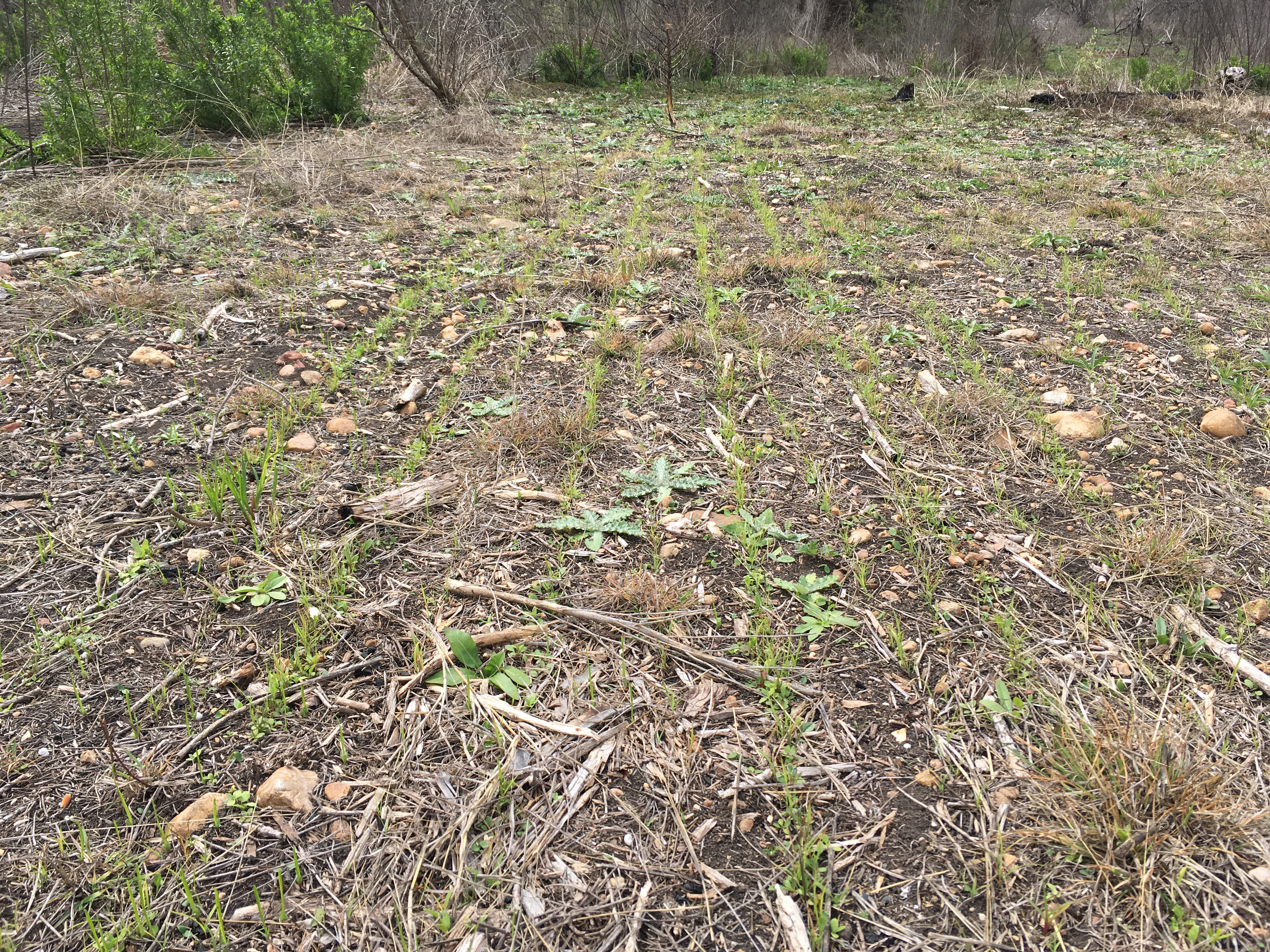
Seedlings growing in the Louis René Barrera Indiangrass Wildlife Sanctuary

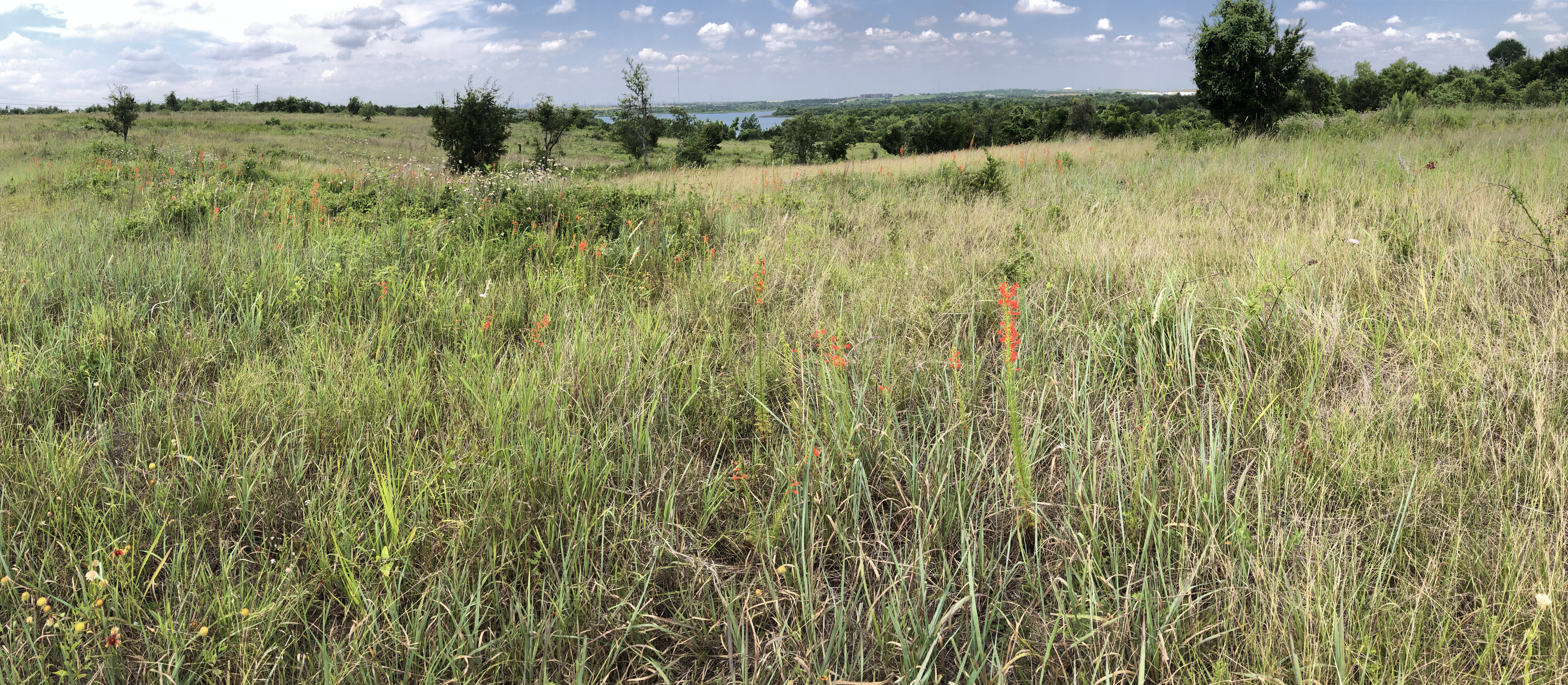
Standing cypresses growing in the Louis René Barrera Indiangrass Wildlife Sanctuary

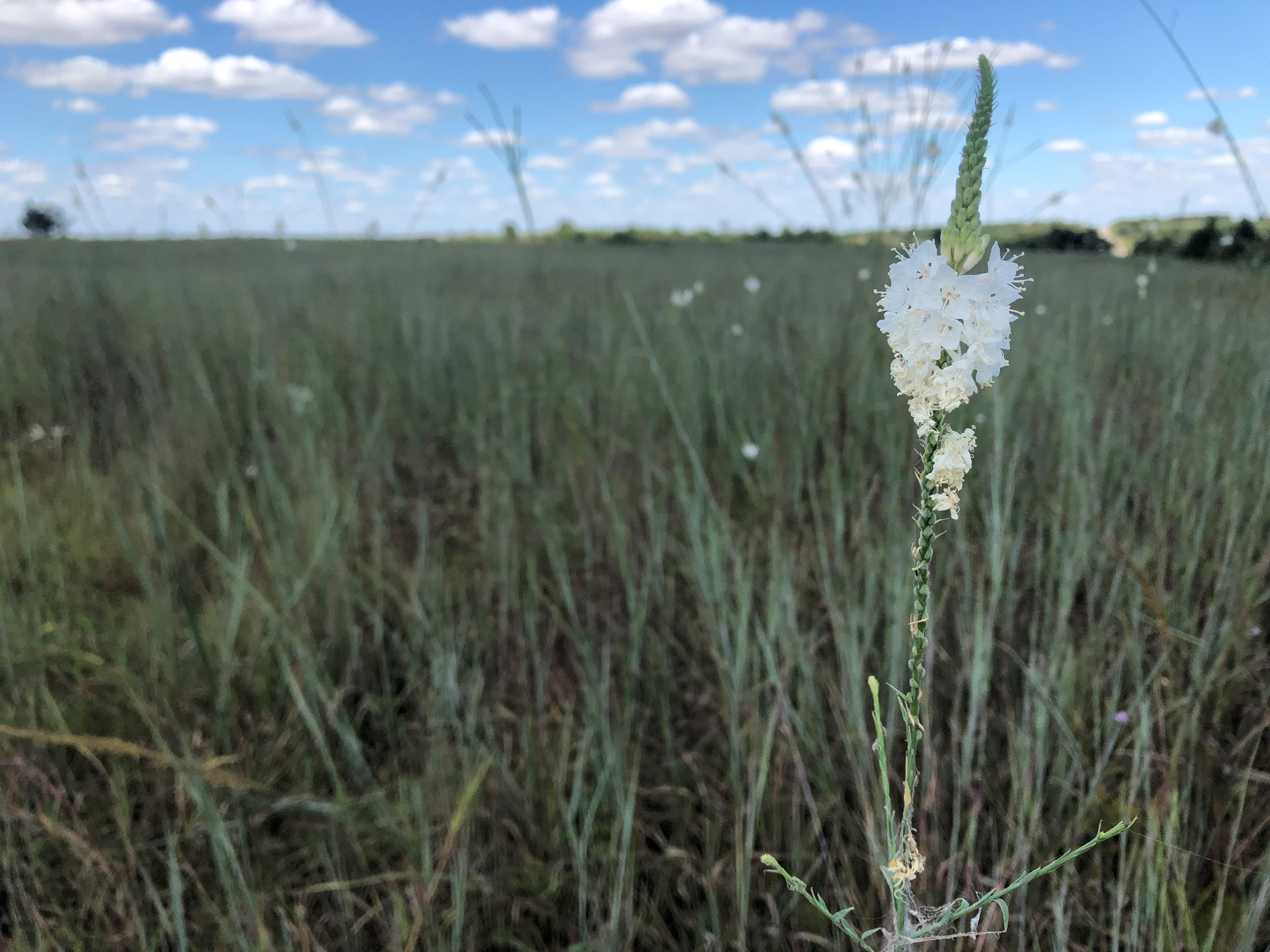
Guara growing in the nature of the Louis René Barrera Indiangrass Wildlife Sanctuary

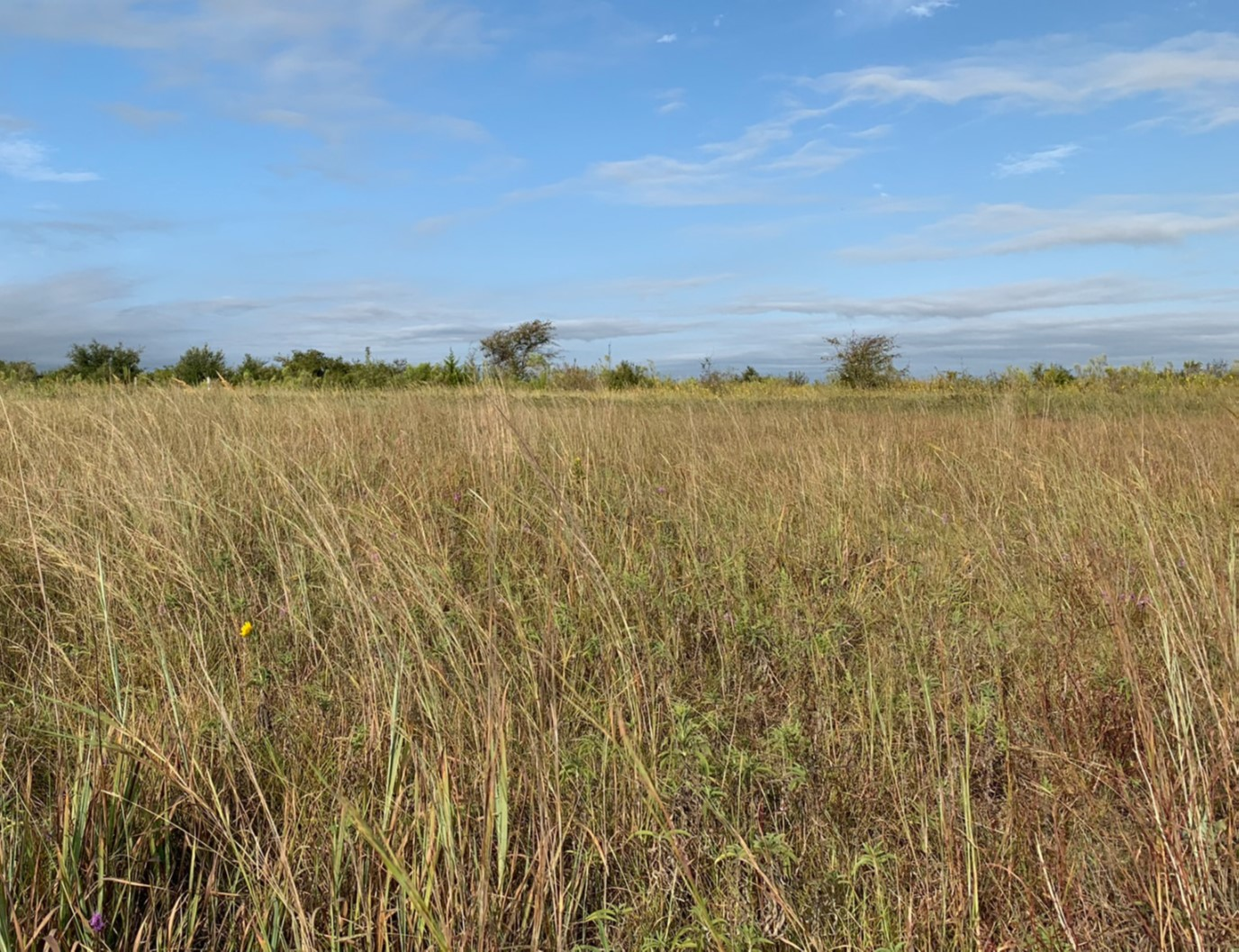
Fields of tallgrass in the Louis René Barrera Indiangrass Wildlife Sanctuary

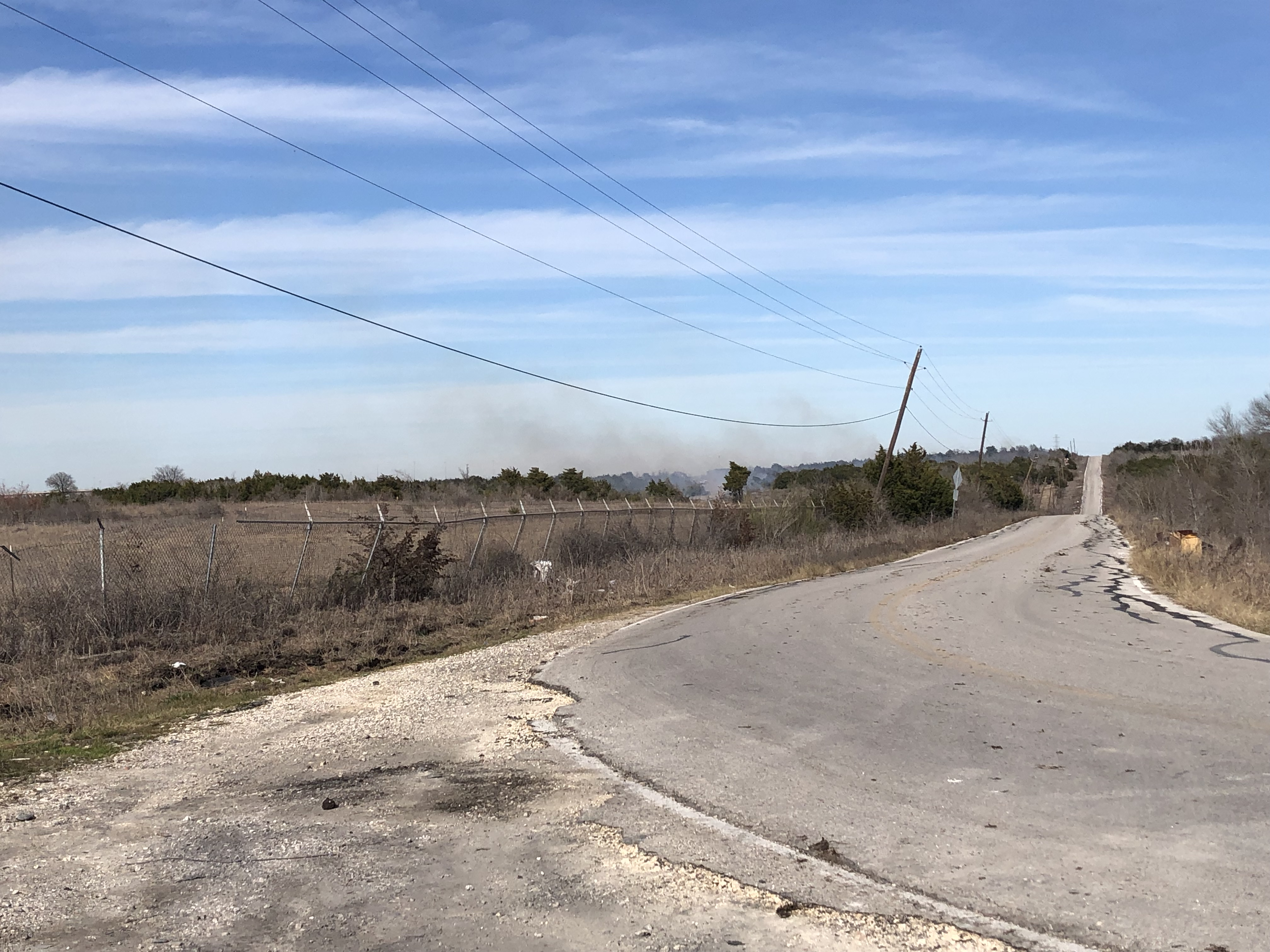
Smoke coming from the Louis René Barrera Indiangrass Wildlife Sanctuary seen from Blue Bluff Road after a prescribed burn

== See also ==
- Sunset Valley, Texas
- Texas Blackland Prairies
