= Susana Almanza =

American environmental activist and politician (born 1952)

- Born: 1952 (age 73–74); Austin, Texas
- Occupation: Director of PODER

Susana R. Almanza is an environmental activist and politician. She co-founded People Organized in Defense of Earth and Her Resources (PODER) in 1991.

== Early life ==
Susana Almanza was born in 1952 and lives in East Austin in Texas. In her youth, she was a Brown Beret, protesting police violence and education inequalities.

== Career ==
Almanza has held positions on City of Austin Parks and Recreation Board, the City of Austin Community Development Commission, and the City of Austin Environmental Board. She helped found Southwest Network for Environmental and Economic Justice and was the founder of Texas Network for Environmental and Economic Justice.

In 1991, Almanza founded People Organized in Defense of Earth and Her Resources (PODER), which campaigns on environmental issues in Austin. It first opposed the expansion of an oil facility run by Chevron Corporation, Coastal Corporation, Citgo, Exxon, Mobil and Texaco, demonstrating to city councillors that there were already groundwater pollution and air quality issues. PODER then successfully called for the decommissioning of the Holly Street Power Plant. Almanza has also protested the construction of a jet fuel tank at Austin–Bergstrom International Airport and is monitoring Tesla, Inc.'s Giga Texas factory.

Almanza was inducted into Southwest Key's Walk of Heroes for commitment to the community, the environment and social justice in 2013. She ran against her brother, Sabino "Pio" Renteria, for East Austin City Council in District 3 in 2014 and 2018, losing both in a run-off. In her 2018 race against Renteria, she claimed that real estate interests had donated money to oppose her. Almanza was cited as opposing CodeNEXT, claiming that increases in population density would further gentrification. In 2021, she was elected to the National Environmental Justice Advisory Council.

== Personal life ==
She is a mother of four children and has two grandchildren.

== Selected publications ==
- Gentrification and Land Use in Austin, October 2006.
