= Austin Aqua Festival =

Festival celebrated in Texas, 1962–1998

The Austin Aqua Festival (usually called Aqua Fest) was a ten-day festival held the first week of August on the shores of Town Lake (now Lady Bird Lake) in Austin, Texas from 1962 until 1998.

A historical perspective was written by Michael Barnes for the Austin American-Statesman in September 2020. (Now behind a paywall) The Austin Aqua Festival Facebook page contains transcripts of interviews with the original founders of the Festival.

== 1962–1969 ==
The Austin Aqua Festival was created in 1962 to promote Austin and the Texas Highland Lakes as a top vacation area and to boost the local economy in what was normally a slow period. The first Aqua Fest occurred Aug. 3-12, 1962. Art Linkletter was the headliner for the event.

The festival offered many water related events such as a 150-mile canoe race, fishing contests, a sailing regatta and an illuminated night time parade on the lake. There were many land based events also including the Miss Austin Aqua Beauty contest, a twilight land parade, a daytime military parade, a rodeo, golf tournament, concerts, dances and fireworks.

Patrons of the fest could purchase a book of discount tickets to get into the various venues. The tickets were called Skipper Script. The next year, the script gave way to the Skipper Pin, which was purchased and pinned on the goers clothing, letting the workers know that the wearer was eligible for discounts on tickets.

The central location for many of the events was "Festival Beach," a small park on Town Lake between the city-owned power plant and a residential neighborhood. The city had originally created Town Lake as a cooling pond for the power plant.

In 1964, the festival added one of its most popular and controversial events, drag boat racing on Town Lake. It also added a water skiing championship, kite flying championship and an Austin Grand Prix - sports car racing on city streets.

The 1966 Aqua Fest started out with the world premiere of Batman, with Adam West and other actors from the movie in attendance. 1966 also saw the start of the "Battle of the Bands", in which unknown rock and roll bands were judged for awards and recognition. Battle of the Bands would become the festival's top draw. The United States Air Force air demonstration squadron, the Thunderbirds first performed at the Fest the same year.

By 1968, an estimated crowd of 150,000 watched the night lighted water parade, which had been renamed to Rio Noche parade in 1964. The crowds were starting to overwhelm Festival Beach causing traffic congestion, parking problems and security concerns for the residents plus the noise of the events, especially the drag boats. However, the mostly Hispanic community had very little political clout to get anything changed.

=== Heritage nights ===
Heritage nights began in 1969. Various nights of the festival would highlight different cultures of Texas. This first year there was Western, German, Czech and Jazz and Rhythm and Blues nights. Throughout the years the theme nights varied as new ones were tried and unpopular ones not repeated. These included Mexican, Black Heritage, Italian, American and International nights. Toward the end of the festival's life, the theme nights had settled to multiple nights with Western and Mexican themes.

=== Aero-Fest ===
Also in 1969, Bergstrom Air Force Base, on the southeast edge of Austin, began an open house in conjunction with Aqua Fest and titled it Aero-Fest. In addition to the Thunderbirds performing, the gathering showed off many military airplanes and other hardware. A crowd favorite was a C-5 Galaxy, which visitors would walk through to get to the main display area. Aero-Fest was an instant success and in just two years it was drawing 80,000 people to the base. Aero-Fest ceased when the base closed in 1993.

== 1970–1979 ==
The new decade saw Aqua Fest's continued growth with the addition of more new events such as a photography contest and motocross in 1971 and the Pet Parade in 1972. But the growth of the event brought confrontation with the neighborhoods surrounding Festival Beach. Complaints had gone unheeded and people finally took to the streets in protest. The anti-Fest coalition was led by Paul Hernandez and a group calling itself the "Brown Berets." Protesters were arrested and they in turn sued the City of Austin and Aqua Fest. By the end of the decade, the drag boat races were gone from Town Lake and pressure was on to find a new location to hold other Aqua Fest events.

== 1980–1989 ==
Due to continued protest and growing crowds, Aqua Fest was moved from Festival Beach to Auditorium Shores, a larger park along Town Lake about a mile to the west of Festival Beach. This larger area meant the festival could now have multiple stages for entertainment. The festival organizers signed up corporate sponsors and local radio stations to co-sponsor the entertainment and began booking national acts.

The City of Austin, which had subsidized Aqua Fest in its early years, now believed the Fest was self-sufficient and withdrew its financial support. The city began charging the festival for use of Auditorium Shores.

In 1985, attendance at Aqua Fest peaked at 252,000. More criticism came at the festival for lack of parking, excessive noise and alcohol abuse issues. This time the rebuke was from residents of the Bouldin Creek neighborhood just south of Auditorium Shores. The opponents of the festival were able to force a non-binding referendum to move Aqua Fest to Lake Walter E. Long in far east Austin. The measure passed but promised corporate support to build a new facility went away as Texas entered an oil bust in the middle of the decade. Aqua Fest stayed at Auditorium Shores.

== 1990–1998 ==
With its multiple stages for entertainment, Aqua Fest changed from a civic event to a live music event. The organizers began to book bigger and bigger acts, even paying premiums to get popular acts such as Dolly Parton in 1992. This drove ticket prices up and attendance down. By 1993, the festival only drew 44,000 people and as a result lost $722,000. The festival organization exhausted its cash reserves and asked its largest creditor, the City of Austin, for permission to pay off its debt in annual installments.

In 1994, Aqua Fest returned to its roots with more local acts and an all volunteer staff and in 1995 brought back the popular theme nights. They also tried drag boat races again, this time at Lake Walter E. Long, but the races drew little interest. It was all too little, too late and the Austin Aqua Festival folded in 1998.

== Notes ==
- Research for this article gathered from clippings and artifacts from Austin History Center collections.
