= People Organized in Defense of Earth and Her Resources =

US environmental organization

- Abbreviation: PODER
- Formation: 1991; 35 years ago
- Headquarters: East Austin, Texas
- Board Chair: Janie Rangel
- Executive Director: Susana Almanza
- Website: www.poderaustin.org

People Organized in Defense of Earth and Her Resources (PODER) is an environmental organization based in Austin, Texas.

The organization informs the local community about local environmental issues and previously campaigned against fuel storage near residential areas.

== Organization ==
People Organized in Defense of Earth and Her Resources is an environmental organization based in East Austin, where it serves a low-income community that primarily comprises Black and Mexican-American immigrants.

The organization disseminates information to the local community about local environmental issues.

It was co-founded by Susana Almanza in 1991, in response to her perceptions of increasing pollution in Austin. Almanza is the Executive Director of the organization.

In the 1990s, the organization gathered anecdotal evidence about health conditions of community members in areas where petrochemical companies stored fuel.

The board chair is Janie Rangel.
