= Brown Berets (Austin) =

The Brown Berets was a Chicano/Mexican-American community-based organization in Austin, Texas founded during the Chicano Civil Rights Movement, modeled after the Brown Berets. As of 2025, the Austin Chapter of the Brown Berets are currently active once more, engaging in social activism, community drives, volunteering, and education. Recent activities include free Bike-Drives for youth at Montopolis, Pan-Am Park, and at the Virginia L. Brown Recreation Center in Austin, Texas.

== Background ==
Founded in 1972, the Brown Berets Chapter of Austin focused on issues similar to the original chapter of Los Angeles that plagued the Chicano community. A quote from Gilberto Rivera, a prominent East Austin activist states, "the formation was due to a ‘call’ from the community & out of their own direct experiences of police violence which followed a persistent pattern in Austin & nearby communities". In addition, the Brown Berets "formulated the ‘Brown Beret Manifesto’ which sought short & long-term goals on community matters like: police oppression, economics, immigration, education, housing, prison reform, medicine, communication (news/media channels)".

The Austin Brown Beret chapter was considered a grassroots organization with the intentions of protecting youth and the rights of citizens. During its active years it worked closely with other grassroots organization and other local chapters when necessary. The chapter ultimately dissolved in 1983. Despite this, the legacy it left continued through the efforts of several other organizations such as PODER, CAMILA – Chicanos Against Military Intervention in Latin America, League of United Chicano Artists (LUChA), Youth Advocacy (formally known as CARNALES Inc.), and East Austin Economic Development Corporation. The group has become active once more, beginning in 2021 with a new generation of Berets.

== Activism ==
=== Santos Rodriguez Case ===
On July 24, 1973, in Dallas, Texas, a 12-year-old boy was killed while in the custody of a police officer who interrogated him over a soda machine burglary investigation. The news ensued violent protests in the city, drawing crowds of enraged citizens and Brown Berets from local Texas chapters. The event sparked demands of civil rights and police reform, uniting the Mexican-American communities in Texas cities over such issues. Furthermore, the Austin Brown Berets were noted in supporting the Dallas chapter during the protests. This incident is a reflection of the struggles that Chicanos faced within the American political system and when dealing with law enforcements .

=== Aqua Fest Boat Fest ===
Beginning in 1963, the Austin Aqua Festival began hosting boat drag racing on Lady Bird Lake (formerly Town Lake) with festival goers occupying Festival Beach. However, the trash and noise produced by the attendees upset the inhabitants of the surrounding neighborhoods, which were predominantly Mexican-American. With their complaints being ignored by the city, protests were led and organized by the Brown Berets and their leader and Chicano political activist, Paul Hernandez. Other groups participated, including El Centro Chicano and the East Town Lake Citizens. The 1978 April protest resulted in charges of police brutality, but it was the last year the boat races were held.

An interview with East Austin resident, Pete Martinez, revealed that the boat races caused parking problems, issues with attendees stepping on residents' lawns, difficulty getting in and out of streets because of traffic, and noise pollution. Furthermore, Paul Hernandez explained that the underlying issues of the boat races were the degradation property value and forcing out of people. He goes on to assert that these activities block neighborhood efforts of revitalization, and instead help developers in deteriorating the residential area to redevelop it as a commercial area. In these comments, Hernandez touches on the concept of "land grabbing" or gentrification, which has been and still is an issue that East Austin faces.
