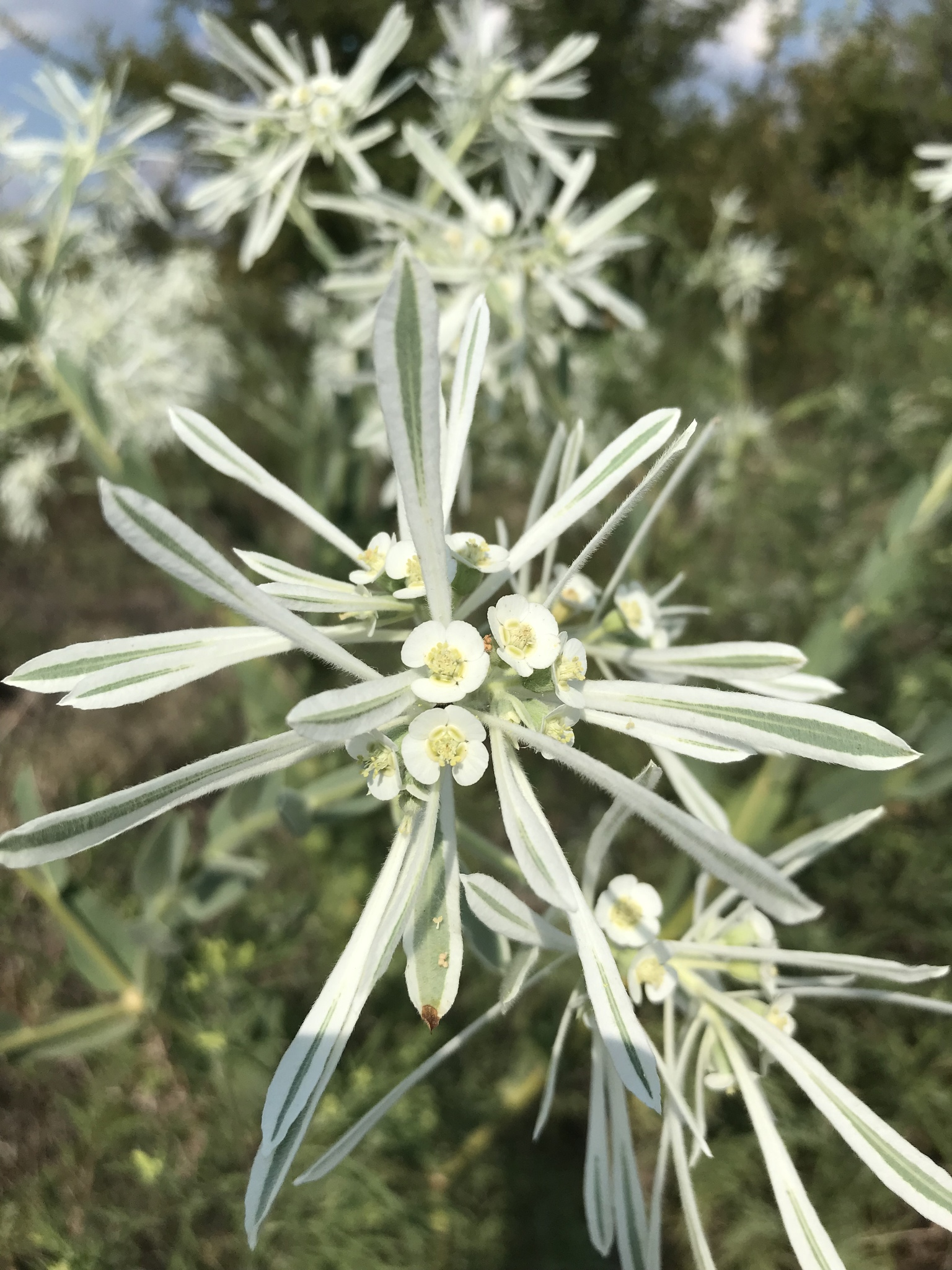

Scientific classification
- Kingdom: Plantae
- Clade: Tracheophytes
- Clade: Angiosperms
- Clade: Eudicots
- Clade: Rosids
- Order: Malpighiales
- Family: Euphorbiaceae
- Genus: Euphorbia
- Species: E. bicolor

Binomial name
- Euphorbia bicolor Engelm. & A.Gray

Synonyms
- Dichrophyllum bicolor (Engelm. & A. Gray) Klotzsch & Garcke; Lepadena bicolor (Engelm. & A.Gray) Nieuwl.; Euphorbia bicolor var. concolor Engelm. & A.Gray

= Euphorbia bicolor =

Species of plant

Euphorbia bicolor, commonly known as snow on the prairie, is a species of flowering plant in the genus Euphorbia, native to the southern United States. It grows 1–4 feet tall, has green and white alternate leaves, and is monoecious with unisexual flowers. It grows in hard clay soils of prairies, rangelands, and edges of forests.

Euphorbia bicolor is a member of the spurge family, Euphorbiaceae. Other members of the family include ornamental plants like poinsettias. The white sap characteristic of this family can cause irritation to the skin or eyes of people who are exposed to it. The honey made from the nectar and pollen of this plant is sometimes referred to as "jalapeño honey" as it can cause irritation to the throat and mouth of those who ingest it.

According to a study, E. bicolor latex extract can induce long-lasting, non-opioid peripheral analgesia in a rat model of inflammatory pain.
