= Paul Hernandez (activist) =

American activist (1946–2020)

Paul Hernandez (September 20, 1946–September 24, 2020), was an influential East Austin Chicano activist, a major figure in Austin politics, and a founder of the local Brown Berets. He led the fight against the Aquafest boat races on Town Lake in East Austin which led to their relocation. He founded El Centro Chicano, which focused on housing, gentrification, drug abuse and police brutality. Hernandez was also a spokesman for El Concilio, a coalition of East Austin Mexican-American neighborhood associations. In the early 1990s a brain hemorrhage and protracted recovery sidelined Hernandez, but he remained committed to East Austin.

== Formative years ==
Hernandez was born in East Austin, the oldest of eight children of Paul Hernandez, Sr. and Maria Olivarez Hernandez. He attended Our Lady of Guadalupe Catholic School, St. Edward's Prep School for Boys, and Johnston High School.

In his early 20s Hernandez helped support his family by working for a ring-making company where he saw how discriminatory practices impacted workers. Hernandez experienced racism on the job, which paid low wages and lacked advancement. When the local Economy Furniture Company workers went on strike in the late 1960s, Hernandez learned from the organizers how they sought to change their workplace. Hernandez attempted to organize his coworkers at the ring-making company. Subsequently the company let him go.

From these experiences Hernandez developed an attitude he called "mentality of resistance' against forces of repression, suppression and oppression. He felt a deep compassion for how the lives of his East Austin community were negatively affected by Austin's political establishment.

Hernandez had pneumonia as young man. While in the hospital recovering, a priest, brought him books to read including Rules for Radicals and "Liberation Theology." Reading these expanding his political perspectives and he realized he wanted take political action and not simply react.

== Brown Berets ==
Hernandez helped found the local chapter of the Brown Berets, who pledged to support, protect and defend the Mexican American community. As the group's leader during the 1970s and 1980s, Hernandez opposed police brutality and fought the boat races on Town Lake (now Lady Bird Lake) in East Austin. Hernandez was the guiding force behind El Concilio, the coalition of Mexican-American neighborhood associations. By 1997, El Concilio was the only substantial East Austin political organization with roots in the 1960s-70s radical confrontational style of the Brown Berets.

Hernandez was instrumental in helping form neighborhood organizations such as East Town Lake Neighborhood Association, Rainey Neighborhood Association, Buena Vista, Barrio Unido, and Govalle neighborhood associations. He also supported formation of alliances with existing organizations, always focused on enabling residents to learn how to defend themselves against gentrification.

To address community issues Hernandez established the East Austin Chicano Development Corporation (EACEDC) by the 1980s. This organization drew its board of directors from the area's neighborhood associations. Along with Carnales, Inc., EACEDC, created new housing in the Oak Springs area. It was one of the few new housing developments in East Austin for first-time low-income homeowners. EACEDC successfully rolled back zoning to help preserve the integrity of the Eastside. It also provided funding for home repairs and sidewalks.

== Aquafest Boat Races ==
The Austin Aqua Festival started drag boat races on the east end of Town Lake (now Lady Bird Lake) in 1964. The very loud races had an adverse effect on nearby East Austin residents.

The East Town Lake Citizens Neighborhood Association, with leaders Paul Hernandez and Edward Rendon Sr. organized noisy, but peaceful protests calling for an end to the races. They were joined by El Centro Chicano and the Brown Berets. In 1978, when police broke up one protest Hernandez was beaten up badly. A widely published photograph shows Hernandez surrounded by plainclothes and uniformed law enforcement wielding billy clubs. Afterward a police officer was suspended for using excessive force and the Austin City Council abolished the drag boat races. The summer of 1978 was the last summer the boat races were held on Town Lake.

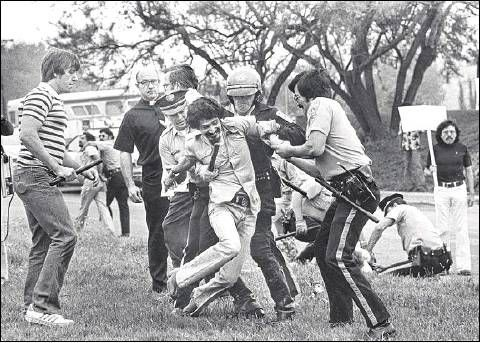

Hernandez helped the East Town Lake Citizens Neighborhood Association develop a plan to beautify the north shore of Town Lake east of IH-35 where the races had been held. The neglected area was improved using a grant the neighborhood received and became a green, recreational park.

== Elected office public service ==
Hernandez was an aide to a state legislator. He served as a local coordinator for President Jimmy Carter's campaign. He ran for state representative in 1984.

El Concilio and Hernandez was instrumental to the campaign of Hernandez's ally, Marcos de Leon, who was elected Travis County Commissioner, Precinct 4 in 1991.

== Klan march beating ==
Hernandez's persistent activism led to him being beaten multiple times. His worst injuries were sustained at the February 1983 Klan march to the Capital. Hernandez and others demonstrated in opposition to the Klan's march. Video footage by a Houston news crew captured events that led to a clash between police and protestors. Police beat Hernandez repeatedly over the head with billy clubs, fracturing his wrist as he held his arms up to protect himself. Hernandez also suffered a severe concussion, a gash to his head, and fractured ribs. Undeterred by the bloody encounter, he recouped and returned to his activism. The event led to renewed efforts by Austin's Black community to bring attention to police brutality.
