= Lake Walter E. Long =

Lake of the United States

- U.S. soldiers and various state personnel conducting airborne and water rescue drills in 2012

- Location within Texas Location within the United States
- Location: Austin, Texas
- Coordinates: 30°17.11′N 97°35.77′W
- Type: Power plant cooling reservoir
- Primary inflows: Decker Creek
- Primary outflows: Decker Creek
- Basin countries: United States
- Managing agency: City of Austin
- Built: 1967
- Surface area: 1,269 acres (514 ha)
- Max. depth: 60 ft (18 m)
- Surface elevation: 555 ft (169 m)

Lake Walter E. Long (also known as Decker Lake) is a reservoir on Decker Creek in Austin, Texas. It was officially impounded in 1967 and provides cooling water for a power plant that produces electricity from petroleum-based fuels. The dam and the lake are managed by the City of Austin. Surrounding the lake is the city's Lake Walter E. Long Metropolitan Park.

== Flora and fauna ==
Lake Walter E. Long has been stocked with species of fish intended to improve the utility of the reservoir for recreational fishing. Fish present in Lake Walter E. Long include catfish, largemouth bass, hybrid striped bass, and sunfish. Plant species present in the lake water include hydrilla, pondweed, bulrush, waterstar grass, American lotus, coontail, and southern naiad.

The Louis René Barrera Indiangrass Wildlife Sanctuary, situated along the north shore of the lake, is managed by the Austin Parks and Recreation Department and serves as the center of an initiative to restore the Blackland Prairie within the preserve. While the sanctuary is not open to the public, it is accessible through guided tours.

== Recreational uses ==
Lake Walter E. Long Metropolitan Park is open for daytime recreational use. Boating and fishing are the most popular recreational uses of the lake.
