= Paul Hernandez (musician) =

Canadian musician

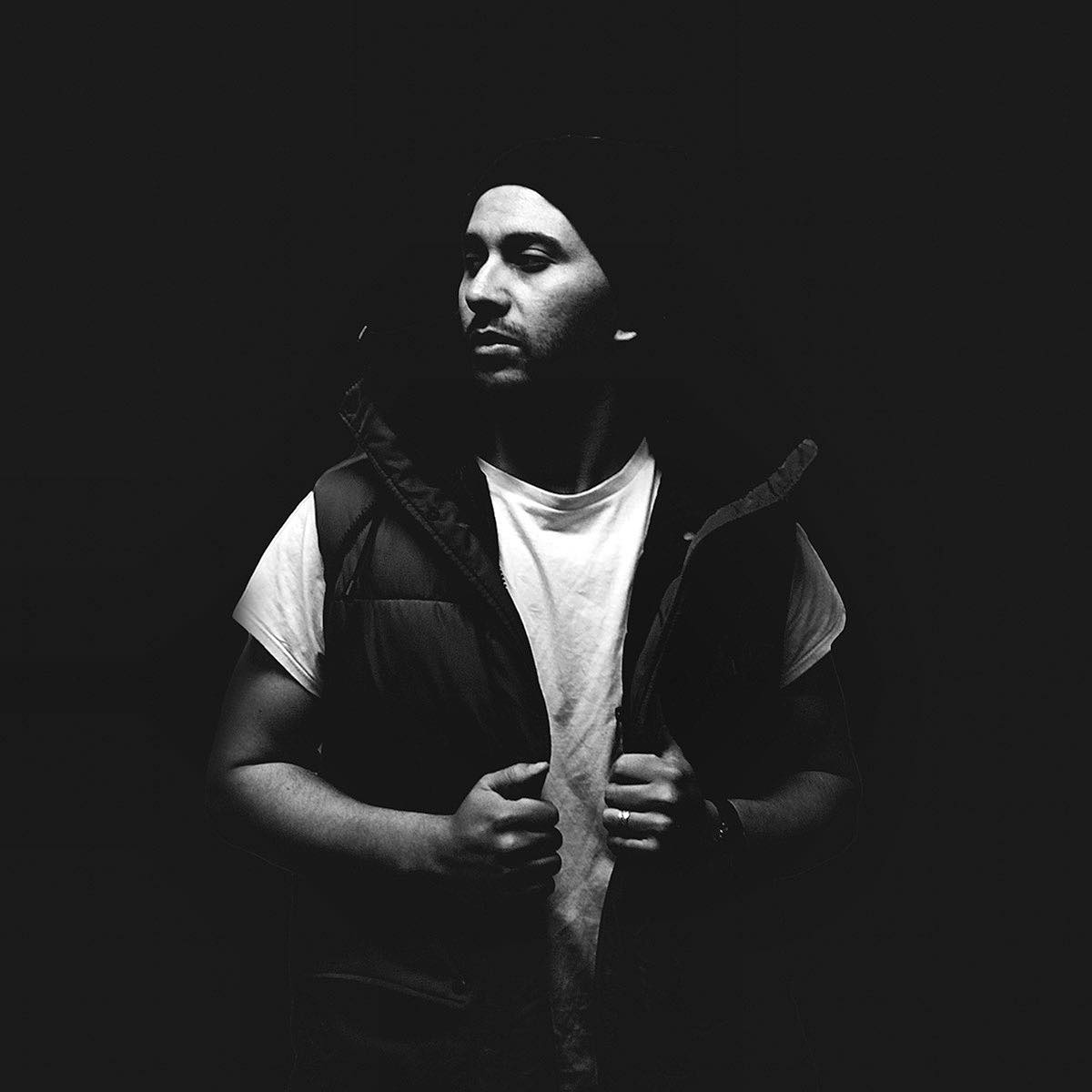
- Born: Paul Hernandez; February 22, 1994 (age 32); Vancouver, Canada
- Occupations: Rapper; Singer; Songwriter; Producer
- Years active: 2010 -
- Musical career
- Origin: Canada
- Genre: Hip-hop

Paul Hernandez (born February 22, 1994) is a Canadian rapper, singer, and songwriter hailing from Vancouver, Canada. He is known for his distinctive pop and trap music blend, as well as his motivational songwriting style.

== Musical career ==
With his debut on Rapzilla's charity compilation album King Culture and his song "Faith," Hernandez rose to fame in the music industry at the age of 18. His impact on the rap and hip-hop scene has grown since then. Since then, he has put out a number of projects and singles.

Hernandez's debut extended play, Deeper Things, was released on June 26, 2020. His abilities as a songwriter and rapper were demonstrated in the project, which received positive reviews from critics.

== Awards and recognition ==
- Rapzilla Freshmen 2012
