= Wax leaf privet =

Wax leaf privet is a common name for multiple plants and may refer to:

- Ligustrum japonicum, native to Japan and Korea
- Ligustrum lucidum, native to China
- Ligustrum quihoui, native to Korea and China
