= List of most popular given names by state in the United States =

The most popular given names by state in the United States vary. This is a list of the top 10 names in each of the 50 states and the District of Columbia for the years 1992 through 2025. This information is taken from the "Popular Baby Names" database maintained by the United States Social Security Administration.

== 1992 ==
Male names
Region	No. 1	No. 2	No. 3	No. 4	No. 5	No. 6	No. 7	No. 8	No. 9	No. 10
Alabama	Christopher	Joshua	James	William	Michael	Brandon	Justin	John	Matthew	Jacob
Alaska	Michael	Christopher	Joshua, Matthew, Tyler	Daniel	Jacob	James	Andrew	Robert	John	Kyle
Arizona	Michael	Christopher	Joshua	Daniel	David	Matthew	Andrew	Jacob	Ryan	Brandon
Arkansas	Christopher	Joshua	Michael	Tyler	James	Cody	Matthew	Zachary	Jacob	William
California	Michael	Daniel	Christopher	Jose	David	Andrew	Matthew	Anthony	Jonathan	Joshua
Colorado	Michael	Joshua	Christopher	Tyler	Ryan	Matthew	Jacob	Nicholas	Andrew	Brandon
Connecticut	Michael	Matthew	Christopher	Nicholas	Daniel	Joseph, Ryan	Andrew	David	John	Robert
Delaware	Michael	Matthew	Christopher	James	Andrew	Tyler	Brandon	Joshua	John	Robert
District of Columbia	Michael	Christopher	John	James	David	William	Kevin	Andrew	Matthew	Robert
Florida	Michael	Christopher	Joshua	Brandon	Matthew	James	Daniel, David	Robert	Tyler	Joseph
Georgia	Christopher	Michael	Joshua	James	William	Brandon	Matthew	Justin	John	David
Hawaii	Joshua	Michael	Christopher	Matthew	Brandon, Ryan	Jordan	David	Justin	Daniel	Nicholas
Idaho	Jacob	Tyler	Cody	Michael	Joshua	Christopher	Andrew	Matthew	Ryan	Justin
Illinois	Michael	Matthew	Daniel	Christopher	Nicholas	Joseph	Andrew	Ryan	Joshua	Brandon
Indiana	Michael	Jacob	Tyler	Joshua	Zachary	Matthew	Andrew	Christopher	Brandon	Nicholas
Iowa	Jacob, Tyler	Michael	Zachary	Matthew	Andrew	Nicholas	Cody	Joshua	Brandon	Austin
Kansas	Tyler	Jacon	Michael	Joshua	Matthew	Christopher	Brandon	Andrew	Zachary	Ryan
Kentucky	Joshua	James	Christopher	Michael	Matthew	Jacob	Brandon	Cody	William	Justin
Louisiana	Christopher	Joshua	Michael	Brandon	Tyler	Matthew	John	James	Justin	Nicholas
Maine	Nicholas	Joshua	Tyler	Christopher	Matthew	Michael	Zachary	Jacob	Andrew	Ryan
Maryland	Michael	Christopher	Matthew	Joshua	James	John	Brandon	Andrew	Ryan	Nicholas
Massachusetts	Michael	Matthew	Christopher	Nicholas	Daniel	Ryan	Joseph	Andrew, John	James	Joshua
Michigan	Michael	Jacob	Matthew	Christopher	Tyler	Jacob	Brandon	Andrew	Nicholas	Ryan
Minnesota	Michael	Andrew, Tyler	Matthew	Jacob	Nicholas	Ryan	Joshua	Joseph	Zachary	Alexander
Mississippi	Christopher	James	Michael	William	Joshua	John	Brandon	Justin	Robert	Matthew
Missouri	Michael	Jacob	Matthew	Joshua	Christopher	Tyler	Andrew	Zachary	Ryan	Nicholas
Montana	Michael	Tyler	Jacob	Matthew	Christopher	Kyle	Joshua	Cody	Justin, Ryan	Zachary
Nebraska	Tyler	Michael	Jacob	Matthew	Joshua	Brandon	Andrew	Ryan	Zachary	Nicholas
Nevada	Michael	Joshua	Christopher	Brandon	Tyler	Anthony	Matthew	Ryan	Jacob, Zachary	Nicholas
New Hampshire	Michael	Christopher	Tyler	Matthew	Nicholas	Joshua	Ryan	Andrew	Jacob	Kyle
New Jersey	Michael	Christopher	Matthew	Joseph	Daniel	Anthony	Nicholas	John	Kevin	Ryan
New Mexico	Michael	Joshua	Christopher	Matthew	Daniel	Joseph	Anthony	Andrew	Ryan	Brandon
New York	Michael	Christopher	Matthew	Joseph	Nicholas	Daniel	Anthony	John	Andrew	David
North Carolina	Christopher	Joshua	Michael	William	James	Matthew	Brandon	Justin	John	David
North Dakota	Michael	Tyler	Matthew	Jacob	Jordan	Cody	Brandon	Joshua	Dylan	Christopher
Ohio	Michael	Joshua	Matthew	Tyler	Christopher	Brandon	Andrew	Jacob	Zachary	Ryan
Oklahoma	Michael	Joshua	Tyler	Christopher	Cody	Jacob	Matthew	Brandon	James	Justin
Oregon	Michael	Jacob	Tyler	Joshua	Christopher	Andrew	Cody	Matthew	Brandon	Daniel
Pennsylvania	Michael	Matthew	Christopher	Tyler	Joshua	Ryan	Andrew	John	Joseph	Nicholas
Rhode Island	Michael	Christopher	Matthew	Nicholas	Ryan	David	Andrew	Joshua	Joseph	John
South Carolina	Christopher	James	Michael	Joshua	William	Brandon	Matthew	Justin	John	Robert
South Dakota	Tyler	Cody	Matthew	Michael	Zachary	Andrew, Jacob	Jordan, Ryan	Joshua	Christopher	Brandon
Tennessee	Christopher	Joshua	Michael	James	William	Matthew	Cody	Brandon	Zachary	Justin, Tyler
Texas	Michael	Christopher	Joshua	Jose	Matthew	David	John	Daniel	James	Justin
Utah	Joshua	Michael	Tyler	Jacob	Jordan	Matthew	Zachary	Taylor	Andrew, Austin	Christopher
Vermont	Michael	Tyler	Ryan	Nicholas	Joshua	Christopher	Matthew	Andrew, Kyle	Jacob	Zachary
Virginia	Michael	Christopher	Joshua	Matthew	James	William	Brandon	John	Andrew	David
Washington	Michael	Jacob	Tyler	Joshua	Christopher	Andrew	Matthew	Kyle	Brandon	Nicholas
West Virginia	Joshua	Michael	Christopher	Cody	Zachary	Brandon	Tyler	James, Matthew	Justin	Robert
Wisconsin	Michael	Jacob	Tyler	Matthew	Nicholas	Andrew	Zachary	Brandon	Joshua	Ryan
Wyoming	Michael	Joshua, Tyler	Jacob	James	Matthew	Andrew	Cody	Robert	Christopher, Joseph	Austin

Female names
Region	No. 1	No. 2	No. 3	No. 4	No. 5	No. 6	No. 7	No. 8	No. 9	No. 10
Alabama	Jessica	Ashley	Brittany	Kayla	Jasmine	Amber	Emily	Sarah	Courtney	Hannah
Alaska	Jessica	Ashley	Amanda	Sarah	Emily, Samantha	Elizabeth	Brittany	Stephanie	Chelsea	Kayla, Nicole
Arizona	Jessica	Ashley	Samantha	Amanda	Sarah	Stephanie	Brittany	Chelsea	Danielle	Elizabeth
Arkansas	Jessica	Ashley	Brittany	Sarah	Emily	Taylor	Kayla	Amanda	Amber	Samantha
California	Jessica	Ashley	Stephanie	Jennifer	Elizabeth	Amanda	Sarah	Samantha	Michelle	Nicole
Colorado	Jessica	Ashley	Sarah	Amanda	Brittany	Emily	Samantha	Rachel	Megan	Hannah
Connecticut	Jessica	Ashley	Sarah	Amanda	Emily	Samantha	Nicole	Chelsea	Stephanie	Lauren
Delaware	Jessica	Ashley	Amanda	Samantha	Brittany	Emily, Sarah, Taylor	Lauren	Megan	Chelsea, Danielle, Elizabeth	Rebecca
District of Columbia	Ashley	Jasmine	Jessica	Brittany	Elizabeth	Sarah	Danielle	Emily	Rachel	Alexis, Lauren
Florida	Ashley	Jessica	Brittany	Amanda	Samantha	Stephanie	Sarah	Jennifer	Nicole	Lauren
Georgia	Ashley	Brittany	Jessica	Kayla	Amber	Sarah	Emily	Jasmine	Lauren	Taylor
Hawaii	Ashley	Jessica	Nicole	Sarah	Chelsea	Jennifer	Brittany	Amanda, Kayla	Samantha	Michelle
Idaho	Jessica	Ashley	Amanda, Samantha	Sarah	Megan	Kayla	Emily	Rachel	Brittany, Nicole	Kelsey
Illinois	Jessica	Ashley	Samantha	Sarah	Brittany	Emily	Amanda	Elizabeth	Stephanie	Jennifer
Indiana	Ashley	Jessica	Brittany	Sarah	Emily	Samantha	Amanda	Kayla	Megan	Taylor
Iowa	Ashley	Jessica	Emily, Samantha	Megan	Kelsey	Amanda	Sarah	Brittany	Kayla	Taylor
Kansas	Ashley	Jessica	Emily	Amanda	Sarah	Megan	Samantha	Taylor	Kelsey	Brittany
Kentucky	Ashley	Brittany	Jessica	Kayla	Sarah	Emily	Samantha	Amanda	Megan	Chelsea
Louisiana	Ashley	Brittany	Jessica	Lauren	Megan	Sarah	Jasmine	Taylor	Courtney	Kayla
Maine	Ashley	Sarah	Emily	Jessica	Kayla	Amanda	Samantha	Chelsea	Brittany	Nicole
Maryland	Ashley	Jessica	Sarah	Brittany	Amanda	Samantha	Emily	Lauren	Rachel	Megan
Massachusetts	Jessica	Ashley	Sarah	Samantha	Amanda	Nicole	Emily	Stephanie	Elizabeth	Jennifer
Michigan	Ashley	Jessica	Samantha	Emily	Sarah	Amanda	Brittany	Chelsea	Megan	Rachel
Minnesota	Ashley	Emily	Samantha	Jessica	Amanda	Megan	Sarah	Nicole	Rachel	Elizabeth
Mississippi	Ashley	Jessica	Brittany	Jasmine	Kayla	Amber	Courtney	Sarah	Lauren	Mary
Missouri	Jessica	Ashley	Brittany	Emily	Samantha	Sarah	Amanda	Megan	Kayla	Elizabeth, Lauren
Montana	Ashley	Jessica	Amanda	Sarah	Samantha	Kelsey	Shelby	Kayla	Taylor	Elizabeth, Emily, Nicole
Nebraska	Ashley	Emily	Jessica	Sarah	Amanda	Elizabeth	Samantha	Megan	Taylor	Kelsey
Nevada	Jessica	Ashley	Amanda	Samantha	Sarah	Brittany	Nicole	Megan	Chelsea	Taylor
New Hampshire	Sarah	Samantha	Ashley	Emily	Jessica	Amanda	Elizabeth, Nicole	Megan	Brittany, Chelsea	Lauren
New Jersey	Jessica	Ashley	Amanda	Nicole	Samantha	Stephanie	Jennifer, Lauren	Sarah	Danielle	Brittany
New Mexico	Ashley	Jessica	Samantha	Amanda	Stephanie	Brittany	Sarah	Nicole	Amber, Chelsea	Mariah
New York	Ashley	Jessica	Samantha	Amanda	Stephanie	Nicole	Sarah	Jennifer	Emily	Danielle
North Carolina	Ashley	Brittany	Jessica	Sarah	Amanda	Samantha	Amber	Megan	Emily	Elizabeth
North Dakota	Ashley	Samantha	Megan	Brittany	Jessica	Amanda	Kayla	Emily	Kelsey	Taylor
Ohio	Ashley	Jessica	Brittany	Sarah	Emily	Samantha	Amanda	Megan	Chelsea	Elizabeth
Oklahoma	Ashley	Jessica	Brittany	Sarah	Taylor	Shelby	Amanda	Chelsea	Megan	Kayla
Oregon	Jessica	Ashley	Amanda	Emily	Sarah	Samantha	Megan	Kayla	Brittany	Elizabeth
Pennsylvania	Ashley	Jessica	Samantha	Amanda	Emily	Brittany	Sarah	Nicole	Megan	Lauren
Rhode Island	Ashley	Jessica	Amanda	Sarah	Samantha	Kayla	Emily	Stephanie	Nicole	Jennifer
South Carolina	Ashley	Brittany	Jessica	Amber	Kayla	Sarah	Lauren	Taylor	Courtney	Amanda
South Dakota	Ashley	Jessica	Samantha	Amanda	Emily	Sarah	Megan	Kayla, Kelsey	Shelby	Brittany
Tennessee	Ashley	Jessica	Brittany	Kayla	Sarah	Amber	Emily	Chelsea	Amanda	Rachel
Texas	Ashley	Jessica	Amanda	Sarah	Brittany	Stephanie	Samantha	Elizabeth	Lauren	Jennifer
Utah	Jessica	Ashley	Sarah	Samantha	Megan	Emily	Rachel	Amanda	Nicole	Chelsea
Vermont	Ashley	Samantha	Emily	Jessica	Sarah	Amanda	Brittany	Megan	Chelsea	Kayla, Rebecca
Virginia	Ashley	Jessica	Brittany	Sarah	Emily	Amanda	Samantha	Lauren	Elizabeth	Rachel
Washington	Jessica	Ashley	Sarah	Amanda	Samantha	Emily	Rachel	Elizabeth	Megan	Kayla
West Virginia	Brittany	Ashley	Jessica	Kayla	Samantha	Amanda	Sarah	Emily	Megan	Tiffany
Wisconsin	Ashley	Samantha	Amanda	Jessica	Emily	Sarah	Brittany, Megan	Kayla	Nicole	Stephanie
Wyoming	Ashley	Jessica	Amanda	Brittany	Sarah	Kayla	Emily	Samantha	Taylor	Kelsey, Megan, Nicole

== 1993 ==
Male names
Region	No. 1	No. 2	No. 3	No. 4	No. 5	No. 6	No. 7	No. 8	No. 9	No. 10
Alabama	Christopher	Michael	James	William	Joshua	Brandon	John	Justin	Matthew	Jacob
Alaska	Michael	Tyler	Joshua	Jacob, Matthew	David	James	Christopher, John	Ryan, William	Daniel	Brandon, Zachary
Arizona	Michael	Christopher	Daniel	Tyler	Joshua	Jacob	Matthew	David	Ryan	Joseph
Arkansas	Christopher	Michael	Joshua	Tyler	Austin	James	Cody	Zachary	Jacob	William
California	Michael	Daniel	Jose	Christopher	David	Andrew	Anthony	Matthew	Joshua	Kevin
Colorado	Michael	Tyler	Joshua	Matthew	Christopher	Jacob	Andrew	Ryan	Nicholas	Brandon
Connecticut	Michael	Matthew	Christopher	Nicholas	Ryan	John, Joseph	Daniel	Andrew	Joshua	Tyler
Delaware	Michael	Matthew	Christopher	John	James	Andrew, Brandon	William	Ryan	Zachary	Tyler
District of Columbia	Michael	Christopher	James	Kevin	John	Anthony	Robert	David	Brandon	Joshua
Florida	Michael	Christopher	Joshua	Matthew	Brandon	Daniel	James	Tyler	David	Joseph
Georgia	Christopher	Michael	Joshua	William	James	Brandon	Matthew	Justin	John	Robert
Hawaii	Joshua	Michael	Matthew	Christopher	Brandon	Tyler	Justin, Ryan	Nicholas	Joseph	Jordan
Idaho	Jacob	Tyler	Austin	Michael	Cody	Matthew	Christopher	Joshua	Brandon	Ryan
Illinois	Michael	Matthew	Daniel	Nicholas	Christopher	Joseph	Jacob	Joshua	Ryan	Andrew
Indiana	Jacob	Tyler	Michael	Zachary	Matthew	Joshua	Brandon	Christopher	Andrew	Nicholas
Iowa	Jacob	Tyler	Austin	Zachary	Nicholas	Michael	Andrew	Cody	Matthew	Brandon, Ryan
Kansas	Jacob	Tyler	Michael	Joshua	Christopher	Austin	Matthew	Brandon	Zachary	Cody
Kentucky	James	Michael	Joshua	Jacob	Christopher	Zachary	Matthew	William	Brandon, Cody	Tyler
Louisiana	Christopher	Michael	Joshua	Brandon	Tyler	Justin	Matthew	James	Nicholas	Jacob
Maine	Tyler	Matthew	Michael	Nicholas, Ryan	Christopher	Joshua	Zachary	Jacob	Brandon	Kyle
Maryland	Michael	Matthew	Christopher	Joshua	Ryan	Brandon	James	Nicholas	John	Daniel
Massachusetts	Michael	Matthew	Christopher	Nicholas	Ryan	Daniel	John	Andrew	Joseph	Tyler
Michigan	Michael	Jacob	Tyler	Matthew	Joshua	Brandon	Nicholas	Christopher	Ryan	Zachary
Minnesota	Tyler	Matthew	Michael	Nicholas	Jacob	Andrew	Zachary	Joseph	Alexander	Joshua
Mississippi	James	Christopher	Michael	William	Joshua	John	Brandon	Justin	Robert	David
Missouri	Michael	Jacob	Tyler	Joshua	Zachary	Matthew	Andrew	Christopher	Nicholas	Austin
Montana	Tyler	Cody	Jacob	Michael	Austin	Joshua	Matthew	Jordan, Kyle	Ryan	Brandon
Nebraska	Tyler	Jacob	Michael	Matthew	Joshua	Austin	Zachary	Brandon	Nicholas	Ryan
Nevada	Michael	Christopher	Joshua	Anthony	Tyler	Ryan	Jacob	Brandon	Nicholas	Daniel
New Hampshire	Matthew	Tyler	Michael	Christopher	Nicholas	Zachary	Ryan	Jacob	Joshua	Andrew, Kyle
New Jersey	Michael	Christopher	Matthew	Joseph	Nicholas	Daniel	Kevin	John	Anthony	Ryan
New Mexico	Michael	Joshua	Christopher	Daniel	Matthew	Jacob	Joseph	Brandon	Ryan	Andrew
New York	Michael	Christopher	Matthew	Joseph	Nicholas	Daniel	Anthony	Kevin	John	David
North Carolina	Christopher	Joshua	Michael	William	Matthew	Brandon	James	John	Justin	Tyler
North Dakota	Tyler	Zachary	Michael	Austin	Matthew	Joshua	Brandon	Jacob	Ryan	Alexander
Ohio	Michael	Tyler	Matthew	Jacob	Brandon	Joshua	Zachary	Christopher	Nicholas	Ryan
Oklahoma	Joshua	Tyler	Michael	Jacob	Christopher	Matthew	Cody	Austin	Zachary	Brandon
Oregon	Tyler	Jacob	Michael	Joshua	Andrew	Austin	Christopher	Daniel	Matthew	Cody
Pennsylvania	Michael	Matthew	Tyler	Christopher	Ryan	Nicholas	Joshua	Zachary	Joseph	Andrew
Rhode Island	Michael	Nicholas	Matthew	Christopher	Ryan	Joshua	Zachary	John	Alexander	Joseph
South Carolina	Christopher	Michael	Williams	James	Joshua	Brandon	Matthew	Justin	John	Robert
South Dakota	Tyler	Austin	Michael	Jacob	Zachary	Cody, Joshua, Matthew	Jordan	Nicholas	Andrew, Kyle	Ryan
Tennessee	Christopher	Michael	Joshua, William	James	Matthew	Brandon	Jacob	Tyler	John	Zachary
Texas	Michael	Christopher	Jose	Joshua	David	Matthew	Daniel	John	Jacob	Brandon
Utah	Tyler	Austin	Joshua	Michael	Jacob	Zachary	Jordan	Christopher	Matthew	Taylor
Vermont	Tyler	Ryan	Joshua	Michael, Nicholas	Christopher	Matthew	Cody	Kyle	Jacob	Zachary
Virginia	Michael	Christopher	Joshua	Matthew	William	Brandon	James	John	Zachary	Tyler
Washington	Michael	Jacob	Tyler	Joshua	Christopher	Nicholas	Andrew	Brandon	Ryan	Alexander
West Virginia	Michael	Tyler	Christopher	Joshua	Brandon, Cody	Zachary	Matthew	James	Jacob	Justin
Wisconsin	Jacob	Michael	Tyler	Matthew	Nicholas	Zachary	Joshua	Alexander	Brandon	Cody, Ryan
Wyoming	Tyler	Christopher	Michael	Joshua	Brandon	Jacob	Ryan	Matthew	Cody, Zachary	Andrew, Austin

Female names
Region	No. 1	No. 2	No. 3	No. 4	No. 5	No. 6	No. 7	No. 8	No. 9	No. 10
Alabama	Ashley	Jessica	Brittany	Kayla	Amber, Taylor	Emily	Sarah	Jasmine	Hannah	Courtney
Alaska	Jessica	Ashley	Sarah	Samantha	Amanda	Taylor	Stephanie	Rachel	Emily, Hannah	Kelsey, Rebecca
Arizona	Jessica	Ashley	Samantha	Amanda	Sarah	Taylor	Brittany	Alexis	Elizabeth	Emily
Arkansas	Ashley	Jessica	Sarah	Brittany	Taylor	Emily	Amber	Hannah	Kayla	Lauren
California	Jessica	Ashley	Stephanie	Jennifer	Elizabeth	Sarah	Samantha	Amanda	Maria	Vanessa
Colorado	Jessica	Ashley	Sarah	Taylor	Samantha	Emily	Amanda	Brittany	Rachel	Elizabeth
Connecticut	Emily	Sarah	Ashley	Jessica, Nicole	Samantha	Amanda	Stephanie	Lauren	Elizabeth	Taylor
Delaware	Jessica	Ashley	Emily	Brittany	Lauren	Amanda	Taylor	Samantha	Sarah	Rachel
District of Columbia	Ashley	Jasmine	Sarah	Jessica	Alexis	Elizabeth, Emily	Lauren	Brittany, Diamond	Rachel	Danielle, Taylor
Florida	Ashley	Jessica	Brittany	Samantha	Sarah	Amanda	Stephanie	Taylor	Emily	Nicole
Georgia	Ashley	Jessica	Brittany	Taylor	Sarah	Emily	Amber	Jasmine	Kayla	Courtney
Hawaii	Ashley	Jessica	Nicole	Jasmine, Kayla	Taylor	Samantha	Brittany	Lauren, Sarah	Megan	Chelsea
Idaho	Jessica	Ashley	Taylor	Amanda	Samantha	Sarah	Emily	Megan	Elizabeth	Kayla
Illinois	Jessica	Ashley	Samantha	Emily	Sarah	Taylor	Brittany	Elizabeth	Amanda	Lauren
Indiana	Ashley	Jessica	Taylor	Emily	Brittany	Sarah	Samantha	Megan	Kayla	Rachel
Iowa	Ashley	Jessica	Taylor	Emily	Samantha	Megan	Sarah	Rachel	Amanda, Elizabeth	Kelsey
Kansas	Ashley	Jessica	Taylor	Emily	Sarah	Samantha	Megan	Amanda	Elizabeth	Rachel
Kentucky	Ashley	Brittany	Jessica	Sarah	Kayla	Emily	Samantha	Taylor	Amber	Megan
Louisiana	Ashley	Brittany	Taylor	Jessica	Jasmine	Sarah	Amber	Courtney	Emily	Lauren
Maine	Emily	Sarah	Ashley	Jessica, Taylor	Samantha	Brittany	Kayla	Amanda	Elizabeth	Nicole
Maryland	Ashley	Jessica	Sarah	Brittany	Emily	Samantha	Amanda	Rachel	Taylor	Lauren
Massachusetts	Sarah	Emily	Jessica	Samantha	Ashley	Nicole	Amanda	Elizabeth	Stephanie	Jennifer
Michigan	Ashley	Jessica	Samantha	Emily	Sarah	Taylor	Amanda	Brittany	Rachel	Megan
Minnesota	Ashley	Emily	Samantha	Sarah	Jessica	Nicole	Rachel	Megan	Amanda	Taylor
Mississippi	Ashley	Brittany	Jessica	Jasmine	Amber	Emily	Courtney	Sarah	Kayla	Lauren
Missouri	Jessica	Ashley	Taylor	Emily	Samantha	Sarah	Brittany	Lauren	Amanda	Megan
Montana	Jessica	Ashley	Taylor	Emily	Samantha	Sarah	Amanda	Kelsey	Megan	Kayla
Nebraska	Ashley	Jessica	Emily	Taylor	Samantha	Sarah	Megan	Amanda	Rachel	Elizabeth
Nevada	Ashley	Jessica	Samantha	Taylor	Sarah	Amanda	Brittany	Stephanie	Danielle	Alexis
New Hampshire	Emily	Sarah	Ashley	Samantha	Jessica	Nicole	Amanda	Brittany	Rebecca	Elizabeth
New Jersey	Jessica	Nicole	Ashley	Samantha	Amanda	Stephanie	Emily	Sarah	Jennifer	Lauren
New Mexico	Ashley	Jessica	Amanda	Samantha	Sarah	Amber	Mariah	Stephanie, Victoria	Brittany	Danielle
New York	Ashley	Jessica	Samantha	Amanda	Nicole	Stephanie	Emily	Sarah	Jennifer	Danielle
North Carolina	Ashley	Brittany	Jessica	Taylor	Sarah	Emily	Amber	Kayla	Lauren	Samantha
North Dakota	Samantha	Ashley	Jessica	Taylor	Brittany	Kelsey	Emily	Megan	Kayla, Nicole	Sarah
Ohio	Ashley	Jessica	Emily	Taylor	Sarah	Brittany	Samantha	Megan	Amanda	Kayla
Oklahoma	Ashley	Jessica	Taylor	Brittany	Sarah	Rachel	Emily	Shelby	Megan	Lauren
Oregon	Jessica	Ashley	Emily	Sarah	Samantha	Amanda	Elizabeth	Taylor	Hannah, Kayla	Megan
Pennsylvania	Ashley	Jessica	Emily	Samantha	Sarah	Amanda	Brittany	Nicole	Rachel	Lauren
Rhode Island	Ashley	Samantha	Jessica	Sarah	Stephanie	Emily	Nicole	Amanda	Kayla	Victoria
South Carolina	Ashley	Jessica	Brittany	Taylor	Amber	Jasmine	Kayla	Emily	Sarah	Courtney
South Dakota	Ashley	Samantha	Jessica, Taylor	Emily	Megan	Amanda	Kelsey	Sarah	Kayla, Rachel	Brittany
Tennessee	Ashley	Jessica	Brittany	Sarah	Kayla	Taylor	Emily	Amber	Megan	Hannah
Texas	Ashley	Jessica	Sarah	Taylor	Stephanie	Samantha	Brittany	Amanda	Elizabeth	Emily
Utah	Jessica	Ashley	Sarah	Megan	Emily	Amanda	Samantha	Taylor	Rachel	Alexis
Vermont	Emily	Ashley	Sarah	Amanda, Elizabeth	Samantha	Hannah	Brittany	Jessica, Kayla	Megan	Alyssa
Virginia	Ashley	Jessica	Sarah	Brittany	Emily	Taylor	Samantha	Amanda	Elizabeth	Lauren
Washington	Jessica	Ashley	Sarah	Emily	Samantha	Amanda	Taylor	Hannah	Elizabeth	Megan
West Virginia	Ashley	Brittany	Jessica	Kayla	Samantha	Megan	Amber	Emily	Sarah	Taylor
Wisconsin	Ashley	Samantha	Emily	Jessica	Sarah	Amanda	Megan	Kayla	Taylor	Nicole
Wyoming	Ashley	Jessica	Taylor	Kayla	Megan	Emily	Amanda, Samantha, Sarah	Alexis, Brittany, Chelsea	Stephanie	Danielle, Hannah, Rebecca

== 1994 ==
Male names
Region	No. 1	No. 2	No. 3	No. 4	No. 5	No. 6	No. 7	No. 8	No. 9	No. 10
Alabama	Christopher	William	James	Joshua	Michael	John	Justin	Brandon	Austin	Matthew
Alaska	Michael	Jacob	Tyler	Christopher	Daniel	Matthew	James	Joshua	Brandon	John
Arizona	Michael	Daniel	Tyler	Jacob	Joshua	Matthew	David	Christopher	Brandon	Austin
Arkansas	Michael	Christopher	Tyler	Austin	Jacob	James	Zachary	Brandon, Joshua	William	Matthew
California	Daniel	Michael	Jose	Christopher	David	Anthony	Andrew	Matthew	Joshua	Kevin
Colorado	Michael	Tyler	Joshua	Jacob	Austin	Matthew	Nicholas	Christopher	Andrew	Brandon
Connecticut	Michael	Matthew	Christopher	Nicholas	Ryan	Daniel	Joseph	Tyler	John	Andrew
Delaware	Michael	Matthew	Christopher	Tyler	James	Ryan	Joseph	William	Joshua	Brandon
District of Columbia	Michael	James	Christopher	William	Anthony	Matthew	John	Kevin	David	Alexander
Florida	Michael	Christopher	Joshua	Brandon	Matthew	Tyler	Daniel	Nicholas	David	Austin
Georgia	Christopher	Michael	William	Brandon	James, Joshua	Matthew	John	Austin, Justin	Tyler	Jacob
Hawaii	Joshua	Tyler	Michael	Brandon	Justin	Jacob	Ryan	Christopher	Daniel, Nicholas	Jordan
Idaho	Tyler	Jacob	Austin	Michael	Cody	Zachary	Joshua	Matthew	Brandon	Justin
Illinois	Michael	Matthew	Nicholas	Daniel	Jacob	Christopher	Joseph	Ryan	Brandon	Tyler
Indiana	Jacob	Tyler	Austin	Michael	Zachary	Brandon	Matthew	Joshua	Nicholas	Andrew
Iowa	Jacob	Austin,Tyler	Zachary	Nicholas	Matthew	Michael	Brandon	Joshua	Andrew	Cody
Kansas	Austin	Tyler	Jacob	Matthew	Michael	Joshua	Zachary	Brandon	Christopher	Andrew
Kentucky	Austin	James	Christopher, Michael	Jacob	Cody	Joshua	William	Zachary	Brandon	Tyler
Louisiana	Christopher	Michael	Joshua	Brandon	Tyler	John	Jacob	Austin	Matthew	James
Maine	Tyler	Nicholas	Matthew	Jacob	Joshua	Zachary	Michael	Brandon	Christopher	Cody
Maryland	Michael	Matthew	Christopher	Ryan	Joshua	Brandon	John	Tyler	Nicholas	Daniel
Massachusetts	Michael	Matthew	Nicholas	Christopher	John	Joseph	Daniel	Ryan	Andrew	Tyler
Michigan	Jacob	Michael	Tyler	Nicholas	Joshua	Matthew	Brandon	Zachary	Christopher	Andrew
Minnesota	Jacob	Tyler	Michael	Matthew	Nicholas	Andrew	Zachary	Joseph	Alexander	Joshua
Mississippi	James	Christopher	William	Michael	Joshua	Austin	Brandon	Justin	John	Jacob
Missouri	Jacob	Tyler	Austin	Michael	Matthew	Zachary	Joshua	Brandon	Christopher	Nicholas
Montana	Tyler	Austin	Jacob	Michael	Cody	Zachary	Andrew	Joshua	Matthew	Brandon
Nebraska	Jacob	Austin	Tyler	Matthew	Michael	Zachary	Andrew	Nicholas	Joshua	Cody
Nevada	Michael	Christopher	Tyler	Jacob	Anthony	Brandon	Daniel	Joshua	Matthew	David
New Hampshire	Michael	Matthew	Tyler	Nicholas	Zachary	Christopher	Joshua	Ryan	Jacob	Kyle
New Jersey	Michael	Matthew	Christopher	Nicholas	Daniel	Joseph	Anthony	Ryan	Kevin	John
New Mexico	Michael	Christopher	Joshua	Brandon	Jacob	Daniel	Matthew	Anthony	Andrew	Joseph
New York	Michael	Christopher	Matthew	Nicholas	Joseph	Daniel	Anthony	John	Kevin	Brandon
North Carolina	Christopher	Michael	William	Joshua	Brandon	Matthew	James	Tyler	Jacob	Justin
North Dakota	Austin	Jacob	Tyler	Brandon	Matthew	Michael	Zachary	Cody, Nicholas	Andrew	Joshua
Ohio	Michael	Jacob	Tyler	Brandon	Matthew	Nicholas	Zachary	Joshua	Christopher	Andrew
Oklahoma	Tyler	Jacob	Michael	Joshua	Brandon	Austin	Christopher	Matthew	Cody	Zachary
Oregon	Tyler	Jacob	Austin	Michael	Joshua	Brandon	Andrew	Christopher	Nicholas	Cody
Pennsylvania	Michael	Tyler	Matthew	Nicholas	Ryan	Christopher	Zachary	Joseph	Joshua	John
Rhode Island	Michael	Matthew	Nicholas	Ryan	Christopher	Joseph	Andrew	Joshua	Zachary	Alexander
South Carolina	Christopher	Michael	Williams	Joshua	James	Brandon	Matthew	John	Austin	Justin
South Dakota	Tyler	Austin	Zachary	Matthew	Jacob	Michael	Cody	Joshua	Brandon	Kyle
Tennessee	William	James	Joshua	Michael	Christopher	Brandon	Jacob	Matthew	Austin	Zachary
Texas	Christopher, Michael	Jose	Joshua	Daniel	Matthew	Jacob	David	Brandon	John	Juan
Utah	Austin	Joshua	Jacob	Tyler	Zachary	Michael	Jordan	Matthew	Nathan	Christopher
Vermont	Jacob	Tyler	Nicholas	Michael	Cody, Joshua, Matthew	Ryan	Dylan	Christopher	Justin	Brandon
Virginia	Michael	Christopher	Matthew	Joshua	William	Brandon	Tyler	John	James	Zachary
Washington	Jacob	Michael	Tyler	Joshua	Austin	Andrew	Christopher	Brandon	Matthew	Nicholas
West Virginia	Joshua	Brandon	Tyler	Zachary	Michael	Cody	James	Christopher	Jacob	Matthew
Wisconsin	Jacob	Tyler	Michael	Nicholas	Matthew	Austin	Brandon	Zachary	Alexander	Andrew
Wyoming	Austin	Jacob, Tyler	Michael, Joshua	Christopher	Zachary	Matthew	Brandon, Cody	Andrew	Nicholas	Dylan

Female names
Region	No. 1	No. 2	No. 3	No. 4	No. 5	No. 6	No. 7	No. 8	No. 9	No. 10
Alabama	Ashley	Jessica	Brittany	Kayla	Emily	Hannah	Amber	Sarah	Jasmine	Taylor
Alaska	Jessica	Ashley	Sarah	Samantha	Taylor	Emily	Elizabeth	Brittany	Amanda	Hannah
Arizona	Jessica	Ashley	Samantha	Taylor	Sarah	Nicole	Emily	Alexis	Amanda	Jennifer
Arkansas	Ashley	Jessica	Brittany	Sarah	Taylor	Emily	Hannah	Kayla	Samantha	Megan
California	Jessica	Ashley	Stephanie	Jennifer	Samantha	Elizabeth	Sarah	Amanda	Emily	Nicole, Vanessa
Colorado	Jessica	Ashley	Sarah	Samantha	Emily	Hannah	Amanda	Taylor	Rachel	Megan
Connecticut	Emily	Sarah	Jessica	Nicole	Ashley	Samantha	Amanda	Taylor	Stephanie	Elizabeth
Delaware	Jessica	Ashley	Sarah	Taylor	Amanda	Emily, Samantha	Megan	Lauren	Alexis	Victoria
District of Columbia	Jasmine	Ashley	Alexandra	Brittany	Sarah	Jessica	Rachel	Alexis	Diamond	Emily
Florida	Ashley	Jessica	Samantha	Amanda	Brittany	Taylor	Sarah	Emily	Nicole	Kayla
Georgia	Ashley	Jessica	Brittany	Taylor	Emily	Sarah	Hannah	Jasmine	Amber	Kayla
Hawaii	Ashley	Jessica	Nicole	Taylor	Jasmine	Rachel	Alyssa, Lauren	Sarah	Samantha	Megan
Idaho	Jessica	Ashley	Samantha	Taylor	Emily	Sarah	Amanda	Megan	Elizabeth	Nicole
Illinois	Jessica	Ashley	Emily	Samantha	Sarah	Taylor	Nicole	Amanda	Brittany	Elizabeth
Indiana	Ashley	Jessica	Taylor	Emily	Sarah	Samantha	Brittany	Megan	Kayla	Hannah
Iowa	Emily	Ashley	Taylor	Megan	Jessica	Samantha	Hannah	Sarah	Kelsey	Elizabeth
Kansas	Jessica	Ashley	Emily	Taylor	Sarah	Samantha	Megan	Elizabeth	Hannah	Kayla
Kentucky	Ashley	Brittany	Jessica	Sarah	Emily	Kayla	Megan	Taylor	Samantha	Hannah
Louisiana	Taylor	Brittany	Ashley	Emily	Jessica	Amber	Victoria	Jasmine	Alexis	Sarah
Maine	Emily	Ashley	Samantha	Sarah	Taylor	Nicole	Amanda	Jessica	Brittany, Kayla	Hannah
Maryland	Ashley	Jessica	Emily	Sarah	Samantha	Taylor	Amanda	Rachel	Brittany	Megan
Massachusetts	Emily	Samantha	Jessica	Sarah	Ashley	Nicole	Amanda	Elizabeth	Kayla	Rachel
Michigan	Ashley	Jessica	Emily	Samantha	Sarah	Taylor	Rachel	Megan	Amanda	Brittany
Minnesota	Emily	Samantha	Ashley	Megan	Taylor	Sarah	Nicole	Jessica	Hannah	Amanda
Mississippi	Ashley	Jessica	Jasmine	Brittany	Amber	Kayla	Courtney	Emily	Taylor	Mary
Missouri	Ashley	Jessica	Emily	Taylor	Samantha	Sarah	Megan	Brittany	Hannah	Lauren
Montana	Jessica	Emily	Taylor	Samantha	Sarah	Ashley	Rachel	Kayla, Kelsey	Nicole	Megan
Nebraska	Jessica	Emily	Taylor	Samantha	Ashley	Megan	Hannah	Sarah	Elizabeth	Amanda
Nevada	Jessica	Ashley	Taylor	Samantha	Sarah	Amanda	Nicole	Alexis	Kayla	Emily
New Hampshire	Emily	Ashley	Samantha	Sarah	Hannah	Jessica	Elizabeth	Nicole	Amanda	Megan
New Jersey	Jessica	Nicole	Samantha	Ashley	Amanda	Emily	Stephanie	Sarah	Jennifer	Danielle
New Mexico	Jessica	Ashley	Samantha	Amanda	Sarah	Victoria	Mariah, Stephanie	Emily	Nicole	Amber, Brittany
New York	Ashley	Jessica	Samantha	Nicole	Amanda	Emily	Stephanie	Sarah	Danielle	Jennifer
North Carolina	Ashley	Brittany	Jessica	Sarah	Taylor	Hannah	Emily	Kayla	Megan	Amber
North Dakota	Taylor	Ashley	Samantha	Emily	Jessica	Megan	Alexis	Kayla	Morgan	Amanda
Ohio	Ashley	Emily	Jessica	Taylor	Sarah	Samantha	Brittany	Megan	Kayla	Rachel
Oklahoma	Ashley	Taylor	Jessica	Brittany	Sarah	Emily	Samantha	Rachel	Megan	Kayla
Oregon	Jessica	Ashley	Emily	Samantha	Sarah	Hannah	Megan	Elizabeth	Amanda	Nicole
Pennsylvania	Emily	Ashley	Jessica	Samantha	Sarah	Amanda	Brittany, Nicole	Taylor	Megan	Rachel
Rhode Island	Ashley	Nicole	Jessica	Sarah	Emily	Amanda	Samantha	Victoria	Alexandra, Kayla	Stephanie
South Carolina	Ashley	Brittany	Jessica	Taylor	Kayla	Hannah	Emily	Sarah	Jasmine	Amber
South Dakota	Megan	Ashley	Jessica	Samantha	Taylor	Elizabeth	Emily, Kelsey, Shelby	Morgan	Kayla	Sarah
Tennessee	Ashley	Jessica	Brittany	Kayla	Emily	Taylor	Sarah	Hannah	Amber	Megan
Texas	Ashley	Jessica	Sarah	Samantha	Taylor	Stephanie	Emily	Amanda	Brittany	Jennifer
Utah	Jessica	Ashley	Megan, Sarah	Emily	Samantha	Madison	Amanda	Alexis, Taylor	Rachel	Hannah
Vermont	Emily	Ashley	Samantha	Jessica	Sarah	Megan	Brittany	Elizabeth, Nicole	Taylor	Hannah
Virginia	Jessica	Ashley	Emily	Sarah	Brittany	Taylor	Samantha	Lauren	Elizabeth	Rachel
Washington	Jessica	Emily	Ashley	Sarah	Samantha	Taylor	Amanda	Hannah	Rachel	Megan
West Virginia	Brittany	Ashley	Jessica	Kayla	Emily	Samantha	Taylor	Sarah	Megan	Amanda
Wisconsin	Samantha	Emily	Ashley	Sarah	Jessica	Taylor	Amanda	Nicole	Megan	Elizabeth
Wyoming	Ashley	Emily, Jessica	Amanda, Samantha	Taylor	Megan	Brittany	Kayla	Sarah	Alexis, Brianna, Jordan, Nicole	Elizabeth

== 1995 ==
Male names
Region	No. 1	No. 2	No. 3	No. 4	No. 5	No. 6	No. 7	No. 8	No. 9	No. 10
Alabama	William	Christopher	James	Michael	Joshua	Austin	Jacob	Brandon	Matthew	Justin
Alaska	Michael	Jacob	Brandon	Tyler	Matthew	Daniel, John, Joshua	Austin	Christopher, James	Ryan	Andrew, Kyle, William
Arizona	Michael	Jacob	Daniel	Tyler	Christopher	Joshua	Jose	Nicholas	Austin	Matthew
Arkansas	Tyler	Jacob	Christopher	Austin	Joshua	William	Michael	James	Brandon	Matthew
California	Daniel	Michael	Jose	Christopher	David	Anthony	Andrew	Matthew	Joshua	Jonathan
Colorado	Michael	Tyler	Jacob	Joshua	Austin	Matthew	Andrew	Nicholas	Christopher	Brandon, Ryan, Zachary
Connecticut	Michael	Matthew	Nicholas	Christopher	Ryan	Daniel	Joseph	Tyler	John	Joshua
Delaware	Michael	Matthew	Tyler	Brandon	John	Zachary	Andrew	Kyle	James	Ryan
District of Columbia	Michael	Christopher, John	William	David	James	Anthony	Kevin	Daniel	Malik	Joshua, Matthew
Florida	Michael	Christopher	Joshua	Brandon	Austin	Matthew	Nicholas	Daniel	Tyler	David
Georgia	Christopher	Joshua	Michael	William	Austin	Brandon	James	Matthew	Jacob	John
Hawaii	Joshua	Michael	Tyler	Matthew	Brandon	Justin	Jacob	Nicholas	Christopher	Ryan
Idaho	Jacob	Tyler	Austin	Michael	Joshua	Matthew	Andrew	Cody	Nicholas	Zachary
Illinois	Michael	Matthew	Nicholas	Jacob	Daniel	Christopher	Joseph	Joshua	Andrew	Ryan
Indiana	Jacob	Austin	Tyler	Michael	Nicholas	Joshua	Zachary	Andrew, Brandon	Matthew	Christopher
Iowa	Jacob	Austin	Tyler	Zachary	Nicholas	Matthew	Brandon	Michael	Joshua	Cody
Kansas	Jacob	Austin	Tyler	Matthew	Joshua	Michael	Zachary	Andrew	Christopher	Brandon
Kentucky	Austin	Jacob	James	William	Christopher	Zachary	Michael	Tyler	Brandon	Joshua
Louisiana	Joshua	Christopher	Michael	Tyler	Brandon	Nicholas	Austin	Jacob	Matthew	John
Maine	Tyler	Jacob	Nicholas	Joshua	Matthew, Michael	Brandon	Zachary	Cody	Andrew	Dylan
Maryland	Michael	Matthew	Christopher	Joshua	Nicholas	Ryan	John	Brandon	Andrew	Tyler
Massachusetts	Michael	Matthew	Nicholas	Christopher	John	Joseph	Andrew	Ryan	Daniel	Tyler
Michigan	Jacob	Michael	Tyler	Nicholas	Matthew	Austin	Joshua	Andrew	Brandon	Zachary
Minnesota	Jacob	Tyler	Matthew	Nicholas	Andrew	Michael	Austin	Zachary	Alexander	Ryan
Mississippi	James	Christopher	William	Joshua	Michael	Austin	John	Justin	Robert	Brandon
Missouri	Jacob	Austin	Michael	Tyler	Matthew	Zachary	Nicholas	Christopher	Joshua	Brandon
Montana	Austin	Jacob	Tyler	Matthew	Michael	Zachary	Brandon, Joshua	Cody	Justin	Christopher, Kyle
Nebraska	Jacob	Zachary	Tyler	Austin	Nicholas	Michael	Andrew	Matthew	Brandon	Joshua
Nevada	Michael	Joshua, Tyler	Brandon	Jacob	Christopher	Nicholas	Austin	Anthony	Daniel	Ryan
New Hampshire	Michael	Nicholas	Tyler	Jacob	Matthew	Ryan	Joshua	Zachary	Christopher	Kyle
New Jersey	Michael	Matthew	Christopher	Nicholas	Daniel	Joseph	John	Ryan	Anthony	Kevin
New Mexico	Joshua	Jacob	Christopher	Michael	Matthew	Anthony	Andrew	Brandon, Daniel	Ryan	Joseph
New York	Michael	Christopher	Matthew	Nicholas	Joseph	Daniel	Anthony	John	Joshua	Brandon
North Carolina	Christopher	Joshua	Michael	William	Matthew	Brandon	James	Jacob	Tyler	Austin
North Dakota	Tyler	Jacob	Austin	Matthew	Zachary	Michael, Nicholas	Ryan	Alexander	Jordan	Brandon
Ohio	Jacob	Michael	Tyler	Austin	Matthew	Nicholas	Brandon	Andrew	Zachary	Joshua
Oklahoma	Tyler	Austin	Jacob	Michael	Joshua	Christopher	Brandon. Matthew	Cody	James	Justin
Oregon	Jacob	Austin	Tyler	Michael	Joshua	Andrew, Matthew	Nicholas	Zachary	Brandon, Daniel	Ryan
Pennsylvania	Michael	Matthew	Tyler	Nicholas	Ryan	Joshua	Zachary	Christopher	Joseph	Daniel
Rhode Island	Michael	Nicholas	Matthew	Christopher	Andrew	Ryan	Alexander	Zachary	Joshua	Daniel, David
South Carolina	William	Christopher	Michael	James	Brandon	Joshua	Austin	Matthew	John	Tyler
South Dakota	Austin	Tyler	Jacob	Michael	Zachary	Christopher	Joshua	Cody	Brandon	Joseph
Tennessee	Austin	Jacob	William	James	Joshua	Christopher	Michael	Matthew	Brandon	John
Texas	Michael	Christopher	Jose	Joshua	Jacob	Matthew	Daniel	David	Brandon	John
Utah	Austin	Jacob	Joshua	Tyler	Michael	Zachary	Nathan	Matthew	Andrew	Ryan
Vermont	Jacob, Matthew	Nicholas	Joshua	Michael	Dylan	Ryan	Brandon, Tyler	Christopher	Cody	Daniel
Virginia	Michael	Matthew	Christopher	Joshua	William	Brandon	James	Tyler	Jacob	John
Washington	Jacob	Michael	Austin	Joshua	Tyler	Nicholas	Matthew	Brandon	Daniel	Alexander
West Virginia	Tyler	Austin	Jacob, Joshua	Brandon	Michael	Christopher, James	Zachary	Matthew	Cody	Joseph
Wisconsin	Jacob	Tyler	Michael	Austin	Nicholas	Matthew	Andrew	Joshua	Zachary	Alexander
Wyoming	Joshua	Tyler	Austin	Brandon, Michael	Christopher	Cody, Jacob, Justin	James	Ryan	Matthew	Daniel, William

Female names
Region	No. 1	No. 2	No. 3	No. 4	No. 5	No. 6	No. 7	No. 8	No. 9	No. 10
Alabama	Jessica	Ashley	Hannah	Emily	Brittany	Kayla	Taylor	Amber	Jasmine	Mary, Sarah
Alaska	Samantha	Jessica	Sarah	Ashley, Hannah	Emily	Amanda, Kayla	Megan	Jordan	Taylor	Brittany
Arizona	Jessica	Ashley	Samantha	Taylor	Alexis	Sarah	Amanda	Emily	Stephanie	Kayla
Arkansas	Ashley	Jessica	Hannah	Emily	Sarah	Brittany	Kayla	Lauren, Taylor	Morgan	Madison
California	Jessica	Ashley	Stephanie	Jennifer	Samantha	Emily	Sarah	Elizabeth	Amanda	Maria
Colorado	Jessica	Hannah	Ashley	Taylor	Sarah	Emily	Samantha	Rachel	Amanda, Megan	Kayla
Connecticut	Emily	Jessica	Sarah	Samantha	Ashley	Nicole	Amanda	Rachel	Taylor	Megan
Delaware	Sarah	Emily	Jessica	Alexis	Ashley	Samantha	Taylor	Amanda	Victoria	Megan
District of Columbia	Ashley	Jasmine	Alexis	Danielle	Jessica	Alexandra, Katherine	Rachel	Sarah	Brittany	Brianna, Diamond
Florida	Ashley	Jessica	Sarah	Emily	Samantha	Taylor	Brittany	Amanda	Kayla	Alexis
Georgia	Taylor	Ashley	Jessica	Emily	Hannah	Sarah	Brittany	Kayla	Alexis	Jasmine
Hawaii	Jessica	Taylor	Ashley, Rachel	Kayla	Nicole	Courtney	Sarah	Lauren	Emily, Samantha	Amanda, Amber
Idaho	Jessica	Ashley	Emily	Taylor	Samantha	Megan, Sarah	Hannah	Amanda	Elizabeth, Madison	Rachel
Illinois	Jessica	Emily	Ashley	Samantha	Sarah	Taylor	Elizabeth	Rachel	Hannah	Megan
Indiana	Emily	Taylor	Jessica	Hannah	Ashley	Sarah	Samantha	Kayla	Megan	Elizabeth
Iowa	Emily	Taylor	Jessica	Samantha	Hannah	Ashley	Megan	Sarah	Elizabeth	Madison
Kansas	Ashley	Taylor	Jessica	Emily	Samantha	Sarah	Hannah	Megan	Madison	Courtney
Kentucky	Ashley	Brittany	Emily	Sarah	Taylor	Hannah	Kayla	Jessica	Samantha	Courtney
Louisiana	Taylor	Ashley	Emily	Brittany	Alexis	Victoria	Jasmine	Sarah	Hannah	Kayla
Maine	Emily	Sarah	Ashley	Hannah	Samantha, Taylor	Brittany, Jessica	Courtney	Kayla	Abigail	Amanda, Elizabeth
Maryland	Emily	Jessica	Sarah	Ashley	Samantha	Taylor	Rachel	Megan	Brittany	Amanda
Massachusetts	Emily	Sarah	Samantha	Jessica	Ashley	Nicole	Amanda	Elizabeth	Hannah	Rachel
Michigan	Emily	Ashley	Jessica	Samantha	Taylor	Sarah	Rachel	Kayla	Hannah	Megan
Minnesota	Samantha	Emily	Ashley	Megan	Rachel	Hannah	Sarah, Taylor	Jessica	Elizabeth	Nicole
Mississippi	Ashley	Brittany	Jessica	Kayla	Hannah, Mary	Jasmine	Emily, Taylor	Amber	Courtney	Anna
Missouri	Emily	Taylor	Jessica	Ashley	Samantha	Hannah	Sarah	Megan	Kayla	Rachel
Montana	Jessica	Ashley	Samantha	Taylor	Emily	Hannah	Madison, Sarah	Amanda	Elizabeth, Morgan	Rachel
Nebraska	Emily	Taylor	Sarah	Jessica	Ashley, Hannah	Megan	Elizabeth	Samantha	Rachel	Morgan
Nevada	Ashley, Jessica	Taylor	Samantha	Alexis	Sarah	Emily	Amanda, Megan	Kayla	Hannah	Elizabeth
New Hampshire	Emily	Sarah	Ashley	Hannah, Samantha	Jessica	Elizabeth	Amanda, Taylor	Kayla	Nicole	Rachel
New Jersey	Jessica	Samantha	Emily	Ashley, Nicole	Amanda	Sarah	Rachel	Stephanie	Jennifer	Danielle
New Mexico	Ashley	Jessica	Samantha	Amanda	Sarah	Mariah	Victoria	Brianna	Brittany, Kayla	Taylor
New York	Ashley	Samantha	Jessica	Emily	Amanda	Nicole	Sarah	Stephanie	Jennifer	Rachel
North Carolina	Ashley	Taylor	Jessica	Brittany	Sarah	Hannah	Emily	Kayla	Elizabeth	Samantha
North Dakota	Ashley	Taylor	Emily, Samantha	Hannah	Megan	Alexis	Jessica	Sarah	Kayla, Madison, Morgan	Courtney
Ohio	Emily	Taylor	Ashley	Jessica	Samantha	Sarah	Hannah	Kayla	Brittany	Megan
Oklahoma	Jessica	Ashley	Sarah	Taylor	Hannah	Emily	Megan	Samantha	Shelby	Madison
Oregon	Jessica	Emily	Ashley	Samantha	Sarah	Hannah	Taylor	Megan	Elizabeth	Amanda, Kayla
Pennsylvania	Emily	Jessica	Samantha	Sarah	Ashley	Rachel	Taylor	Amanda	Brittany	Megan
Rhode Island	Samantha	Emily	Ashley	Amanda	Jessica	Victoria	Lauren	Sarah	Nicole	Kayla, Rachel
South Carolina	Taylor	Ashley	Jessica	Brittany	Kayla	Emily	Hannah	Sarah	Courtney	Alexis
South Dakota	Ashley	Taylor	Samantha	Jessica	Megan	Morgan	Emily	Amanda, Elizabeth, Shelby	Kayla	Hannah
Tennessee	Ashley	Jessica	Hannah	Brittany	Emily	Sarah	Taylor	Kayla	Rachel	Megan
Texas	Ashley	Jessica	Sarah	Emily	Samantha	Taylor	Victoria	Stephanie	Elizabeth	Brittany
Utah	Jessica	Madison	Sarah	Emily	Ashley	Megan	Samantha	Rachel	Alexis	Taylor
Vermont	Emily	Sarah	Ashley	Samantha	Taylor	Hannah	Brittany	Elizabeth	Abigail, Kayla, Rachel	Megan, Olivia
Virginia	Jessica	Emily	Sarah	Ashley	Taylor	Brittany	Rachel	Samantha	Hannah	Kayla
Washington	Jessica	Emily	Ashley	Hannah	Samantha	Sarah	Taylor	Amanda	Rachel	Megan
West Virginia	Brittany	Ashley, Emily	Kayla	Taylor	Jessica	Hannah	Sarah	Samantha	Megan	Courtney
Wisconsin	Emily	Samantha	Ashley	Hannah	Megan	Jessica	Kayla	Sarah	Elizabeth	Rachel
Wyoming	Jessica	Emily	Taylor	Hannah	Amanda, Ashley, Sarah	Megan	Courtney, Morgan	Shelby	Alexis, Samantha	Alyssa, Jordan

== 1996 ==
Male names
Region	No. 1	No. 2	No. 3	No. 4	No. 5	No. 6	No. 7	No. 8	No. 9	No. 10
Alabama	William	Michael	Austin	Christopher	James	Joshua	Jacob	John	Matthew	Justin
Alaska	Michael	Jacob	John	David	James, Matthew	Christopher	William	Tyler	Daniel	Joshua
Arizona	Michael	Jacob	Daniel	Jose	Tyler	Joshua	Matthew	Christopher	Anthony	Nicholas
Arkansas	Jacob	Tyler	Austin	Michael	Christopher	William	James	Joshua	Brandon	Matthew
California	Daniel	Jose	Michael	David	Christopher	Anthony	Andrew	Joshua	Matthew	Jonathan
Colorado	Jacob	Michael	Tyler	Matthew	Joshua	Andrew	Austin	Christopher	Ryan	Nicholas
Connecticut	Michael	Matthew	Nicholas	Christopher	John	Ryan	Joseph	Daniel	Andrew	Tyler
Delaware	Michael	Matthew	Christopher	Tyler	Ryan	Zachary	Brandon, John	Joshua	Nicholas	James
District of Columbia	Michael	John	William	Christopher	David	Malik	Matthew	James	Daniel	Alexander, Joshua
Florida	Michael	Christopher	Joshua	Matthew	Brandon	Tyler	Nicholas	Austin	Daniel	David
Georgia	Christopher	Joshua	William	Michael	Austin	James	Jacob	Brandon	John	Matthew
Hawaii	Joshua	Michael	Brandon	Nicholas	Tyler	Christopher, Justin	Austin, Matthew	Jordan	Jacob, Ryan	Christian
Idaho	Jacob	Austin	Tyler	Joshua	Michael	Zachary	Matthew	Andrew	Cody	Daniel
Illinois	Michael	Jacob	Matthew	Nicholas	Daniel	Joseph	Christopher	Joshua	Andrew	David
Indiana	Jacob	Austin	Tyler	Michael, Zachary	Matthew	Nicholas	Andrew	Brandon	Joshua	Christopher
Iowa	Jacob	Austin	Tyler	Zachary	Nicholas	Michael	Matthew	Brandon	Ryan	Andrew
Kansas	Jacob	Austin	Tyler	Matthew	Michael	Zachary	Joshua	Andrew	Nicholas	Christopher
Kentucky	Austin	Jacob	James	William	Zachary	Christopher, Matthew	Joshua	Tyler	Michael	Brandon
Louisiana	Christopher	Joshua	Tyler	Michael	Austin	Brandon	Jacob	Nicholas	Matthew	John
Maine	Tyler	Jacob	Nicholas	Matthew	Zachary	Brandon	Joshua	Benjamin	Christopher, Michael	Andrew
Maryland	Michael	Matthew	Christopher	Nicholas	Joshua	Jacob	Brandon	William	James	Tyler
Massachusetts	Michael	Matthew	Nicholas	Christopher	John	Joseph	Andrew	Ryan	Daniel	Joshua
Michigan	Jacob	Michael	Tyler	Nicholas	Austin	Matthew	Joshua	Andrew	Brandon	Zachary
Minnesota	Jacob	Nicholas	Matthew	Tyler	Michael	Andrew, Zachary	Joseph	Austin	Ryan	Samuel
Mississippi	William	Christopher	Joshua	James	Austin	Michael	Justin	Brandon	John	Jacob
Missouri	Jacob	Austin	Tyler	Michael	Andrew	Matthew	Joshua	Nicholas	Zachary	Christopher
Montana	Jacob	Tyler	Michael	Austin	Joshua	Cody	Matthew	Brandon	Zachary	Ryan
Nebraska	Jacob	Austin	Tyler	Zachary	Michael	Matthew	Andrew, Joshua	Nicholas	Alexander	Joseph
Nevada	Michael	Brandon	Jacob	Anthony	Daniel	Austin	Joshua, Tyler	Matthew	Christopher, David	Nicholas
New Hampshire	Matthew	Nicholas	Jacob	Michael	Tyler	Andrew	Christopher	Ryan	Joshua	Zachary
New Jersey	Michael	Matthew	Christopher	Nicholas	Joseph	Daniel	Ryan	John	Anthony	Andrew
New Mexico	Michael	Joshua	Christopher	Jacob	Brandon, Matthew	Daniel	Joseph	Anthony	David	Tyler
New York	Michael	Matthew	Christopher	Nicholas	Joseph	Daniel	Anthony	Brandon	Joshua	John
North Carolina	Joshua	Christopher	Michael	William	Matthew	Jacob	Austin	Brandon	Tyler	James
North Dakota	Jacob	Austin	Tyler	Andrew	Matthew	Brandon, Nicholas	Alexander	Michael	Ryan, Zachary	Logan
Ohio	Jacob	Michael	Tyler	Austin	Matthew, Nicholas	Brandon	Andrew	Zachary	Joshua	Joseph
Oklahoma	Tyler	Jacob	Michael	Austin	Joshua	Matthew	Christopher	Zachary	Brandon	James
Oregon	Jacob	Austin	Tyler	Michael	Andrew	Joshua	Brandon	Nicholas	Daniel	Matthew
Pennsylvania	Michael	Matthew	Tyler	Nicholas	Ryan	Joseph	Christopher	Zachary	Jacob	John
Rhode Island	Nicholas	Michael	Matthew	Christopher	Ryan	Andrew	Joseph	Tyler	Zachary	Joshua
South Carolina	Christopher	William	Austin	Joshua	Michael	James	Matthew	Brandon	John	Zachary
South Dakota	Jacob	Tyler	Austin	Matthew	Zachary	Andrew	Cody	Joshua	Benjamin	Joseph
Tennessee	Austin	William	Jacob	Joshua	Christopher	Michael	James	Matthew	Brandon	Tyler
Texas	Jose	Christopher	Michael	Joshua	Jacob	David	Matthew	Daniel	Jonathan	Brandon
Utah	Jacob	Austin	Joshua	Tyler	Michael	Zachary	Matthew	Andrew	Nathan	Jordan
Vermont	Nicholas	Jacob	Matthew	Tyler	Brandon, Christopher	Joshua, Ryan	Michael	Dylan, Kyle	Joseph	Daniel, William
Virginia	Michael	Christopher	Matthew	Joshua	William	Jacob	John	Brandon	Tyler	James
Washington	Jacob	Austin	Michael	Tyler	Joshua	Brandon	Nicholas	Matthew	Andrew	Ryan
West Virginia	Tyler	Jacob	Austin	Zachary	Brandon	Joshua	Michael	Cody	James	Christopher
Wisconsin	Jacob	Nicholas	Tyler	Michael	Austin	Matthew	Zachary	Brandon	Joseph	Joshua
Wyoming	Tyler	Jacob	Austin	Michael	Brandon, Joshua, Matthew	Zachary	Andrew, John	Cody	Christopher, Ryan	Justin

Female names
Region	No. 1	No. 2	No. 3	No. 4	No. 5	No. 6	No. 7	No. 8	No. 9	No. 10
Alabama	Hannah	Emily	Ashley	Jessica	Brittany	Taylor	Kayla	Alexis	Sarah	Mary
Alaska	Ashley	Jessica	Emily	Sarah	Samantha	Megan	Hannah, Madison	Amanda	Elizabeth, Taylor	Rachel
Arizona	Jessica	Ashley	Samantha	Alexis	Taylor	Emily	Sarah	Alyssa	Hannah, Madison	Elizabeth
Arkansas	Hannah	Emily	Ashley	Jessica	Sarah	Taylor	Madison	Kayla	Brittany	Haley
California	Jessica	Ashley	Stephanie	Jennifer	Emily	Samantha	Sarah	Vanessa	Elizabeth	Maria
Colorado	Emily	Hannah	Jessica	Sarah	Ashley, Samantha	Taylor	Rachel	Madison	Megan	Elizabeth
Connecticut	Emily	Sarah	Samantha	Jessica	Nicole	Amanda	Ashley	Rachel	Taylor	Elizabeth
Delaware	Emily	Taylor	Sarah	Samantha	Jessica	Rachel	Ashley	Alexis	Megan	Elizabeth
District of Columbia	Alexis	Taylor	Emily, Jessica	Sarah	Jasmine	Ashley	Katherine	Kayla	Imani, Jennifer	Elizabeth
Florida	Ashley	Jessica	Emily	Taylor	Sarah	Samantha	Alexis	Kayla	Brittany	Amanda
Georgia	Ashley	Hannah	Taylor	Jessica	Emily	Sarah	Alexis	Brittany	Madison	Kayla
Hawaii	Taylor	Kayla	Ashley	Jessica	Rachel	Sarah	Samantha	Kiana	Emily, Megan, Nicole	Alyssa
Idaho	Emily	Hannah	Samantha	Jessica	Taylor	Madison	Megan	Ashley	Sarah	Haley
Illinois	Jessica	Emily	Ashley	Samantha	Sarah	Taylor	Elizabeth	Alexis	Hannah	Megan
Indiana	Emily	Hannah	Taylor	Ashley	Jessica	Sarah	Samantha	Megan	Alexis	Madison
Iowa	Emily	Hannah	Taylor	Madison	Samantha	Jessica	Ashley	Megan	Rachel	Sarah
Kansas	Madison	Hannah	Ashley	Emily	Taylor	Jessica	Megan	Sarah	Samantha	Alexis
Kentucky	Hannah	Ashley	Emily	Sarah	Kayla	Taylor	Brittany	Jessica	Courtney	Megan
Louisiana	Alexis	Taylor	Emily	Ashley	Brittany	Sarah	Victoria	Hannah	Kayla	Courtney
Maine	Emily	Sarah	Ashley, Hannah	Samantha	Taylor	Megan	Courtney	Kayla	Jessica	Abigail, Nicole
Maryland	Emily	Sarah	Rachel	Ashley	Jessica	Taylor	Kayla	Samantha	Hannah	Megan
Massachusetts	Emily	Sarah	Samantha	Jessica	Rachel	Ashley	Nicole	Amanda	Elizabeth	Hannah
Michigan	Emily	Samantha	Jessica	Ashley, Sarah	Hannah	Rachel, Taylor	Alexis	Kayla	Megan	Madison
Minnesota	Emily	Samantha	Hannah	Ashley	Megan	Sarah	Rachel	Elizabeth	Taylor	Jessica
Mississippi	Ashley	Hannah	Alexis	Jasmine	Taylor	Jessica	Anna	Brittany	Kayla	Amber
Missouri	Emily	Taylor	Hannah	Jessica	Ashley	Samantha	Sarah	Madison	Megan	Rachel
Montana	Jessica, Taylor	Hannah	Emily	Ashley, Samantha	Madison	Megan	Sarah	Kayla	Amanda	Elizabeth
Nebraska	Emily	Hannah	Taylor	Megan	Jessica	Samantha	Sarah	Ashley, Madison	Elizabeth	Morgan
Nevada	Jessica	Ashley	Samantha	Taylor	Sarah	Alexis	Emily	Kayla	Amanda	Hannah
New Hampshire	Emily	Sarah	Hannah	Samantha	Jessica	Megan	Elizabeth	Ashley	Taylor	Rachel
New Jersey	Samantha	Jessica	Nicole	Emily	Amanda	Ashley	Sarah	Rachel	Stephanie	Lauren
New Mexico	Samantha	Ashley	Mariah	Jessica	Alexis	Sarah	Alyssa	Emily, Victoria	Brianna	Brittany, Kayla
New York	Ashley	Samantha	Emily	Jessica	Amanda	Sarah	Nicole	Rachel	Stephanie	Jennifer
North Carolina	Hannah	Ashley	Taylor	Jessica	Sarah	Kayla	Emily	Brittany	Madison	Alexis
North Dakota	Emily	Taylor	Hannah	Ashley	Madison	Alexis	Samantha	Jessica	Rachel	Sarah
Ohio	Emily	Taylor	Ashley, Sarah	Hannah	Samantha	Megan	Jessica	Rachel	Alexis	Kayla
Oklahoma	Madison	Taylor	Ashley	Emily	Jessica	Hannah	Sarah	Brittany	Rachel	Elizabeth
Oregon	Emily	Jessica	Hannah	Ashley	Sarah	Samantha	Madison	Megan	Rachel	Taylor
Pennsylvania	Emily	Sarah	Jessica	Samantha	Rachel	Ashley	Taylor	Amanda	Hannah	Megan
Rhode Island	Emily	Samantha	Sarah	Ashley	Jessica	Amanda	Alexandra	Victoria	Rachel	Nicole
South Carolina	Taylor	Ashley	Jessica	Hannah, Kayla	Brittany	Emily	Alexis	Sarah	Courtney	Jasmine
South Dakota	Samantha	Emily	Ashley	Jessica, Taylor	Hannah, Megan	Sarah	Morgan, Rachel	Courtney	Shelby	Brooke
Tennessee	Ashley	Hannah	Emily	Jessica	Sarah	Taylor	Kayla	Alexis	Rachel	Brittany
Texas	Ashley	Jessica	Emily	Samantha	Sarah	Alexis	Victoria	Taylor	Stephanie	Hannah
Utah	Madison	Jessica	Emily	Megan	Ashley, Sarah	Rachel	Alexis	Samantha	Hannah	Taylor
Vermont	Emily	Samantha	Hannah	Taylor	Ashley, Sarah	Elizabeth	Megan	Olivia	Jessica	Morgan
Virginia	Emily	Sarah	Taylor	Jessica	Ashley	Rachel	Hannah	Kayla	Elizabeth	Brittany
Washington	Emily	Sarah	Jessica	Hannah	Samantha	Madison	Ashley	Elizabeth	Taylor	Rachel
West Virginia	Emily	Hannah	Jessica	Ashley	Brittany	Taylor	Sarah	Kayla	Samantha	Megan
Wisconsin	Emily	Samantha	Hannah	Ashley	Megan	Taylor	Rachel	Elizabeth	Jessica	Kayla
Wyoming	Taylor	Jessica	Ashley	Emily	Samantha	Megan, Morgan	Sarah	Kayla	Hannah, Madison, Shelby	Alyssa

== 1997 ==
Male names
Region	No. 1	No. 2	No. 3	No. 4	No. 5	No. 6	No. 7	No. 8	No. 9	No. 10
Alabama	William	Christopher	James	Jacob	Joshua	Austin	Michael	John, Matthew	Brandon	Justin
Alaska	Jacob	James	Michael	Joshua	Brandon, Joseph	John	Tyler	Zachary	Christopher	David
Arizona	Jacob	Michael	Daniel	Jose	Christopher	Anthony	Matthew	Tyler	Joshua	Andrew
Arkansas	Jacob	Austin	Christopher	Michael	Tyler	Joshua	Zachary	William	Matthew	James
California	Daniel	Michael	Jose	Anthony	David	Christopher	Andrew	Matthew	Jonathan	Jacob
Colorado	Jacob	Michael	Matthew	Austin	Joshua	Tyler	Andrew	Christopher	Nicholas	Brandon
Connecticut	Michael	Matthew	Nicholas	Christopher	Daniel	John	Ryan	Joseph	Andrew	Zachary
Delaware	Michael	Matthew	Tyler	Joshua	Christopher, Nicholas	Andrew	Jacob	Zachary	Ryan	John
District of Columbia	Michael	John	William	David	James	Christopher	Anthony, Joshua	Kevin	Joseph	Andrew, Daniel
Florida	Michael	Christopher	Joshua	Matthew	Brandon	Austin	Nicholas	Jacob	Daniel	Tyler
Georgia	Christopher	Michael	William	Joshua	Jacob	Austin	Brandon	James	Matthew	John
Hawaii	Joshua	Michael, Tyler	Justin	Jacob	Jordan	Brandon, Noah	Nicholas	Matthew	Christopher	Austin
Idaho	Jacob	Austin	Tyler	Joshua	Matthew	Michael	Andrew	Brandon	Ryan	Christopher, Justin
Illinois	Michael	Jacob	Nicholas	Matthew	Daniel	Joseph	Joshua	Tyler	Christopher	Andrew
Indiana	Jacob	Austin	Michael	Tyler	Zachary	Matthew	Nicholas	Joshua	Brandon	Andrew
Iowa	Jacob	Austin	Tyler	Zachary	Nicholas	Michael	Matthew	Andrew	Brandon	Joshua
Kansas	Jacob	Austin	Michael	Matthew	Nicholas	Joseph	Zachary	Tyler	Andrew	Brandon
Kentucky	Austin	Jacob	James	William	Matthew	Michael	Joshua	Brandon	Zachary	Christopher
Louisiana	Joshua	Michael	Christopher	Tyler	Jacob	Austin	Matthew	Brandon	Nicholas	John
Maine	Jacob	Nicholas	Tyler	Matthew	Joshua	Zachary	Brandon	Michael	Benjamin	Kyle
Maryland	Michael	Matthew	Joshua	Nicholas	Christopher	Jacob	John	Brandon	Ryan	Andrew
Massachusetts	Matthew	Michael	Nicholas	Christopher	John	Andrew	Joseph	Ryan	Daniel	Jacob
Michigan	Jacob	Michael	Austin	Tyler	Nicholas	Joshua	Andrew	Matthew	Brandon	Zachary
Minnesota	Jacob	Matthew	Nicholas	Andrew	Austin	Michael	Tyler	Samuel	Joseph	Zachary
Mississippi	William	Christopher	James	Joshua	John	Michael	Brandon	Tyler	Austin	Robert
Missouri	Jacob	Austin	Tyler	Michael	Zachary	Nicholas	Matthew	Andrew	Joshua	Ryan
Montana	Jacob	Austin	Tyler	Matthew	Michael	Joshua	Ryan	William	Zachary	Cody
Nebraska	Jacob	Austin	Tyler, Zachary	Matthew	Joshua	Nicholas	Andrew, Michael	Ryan	Alexander	Brandon
Nevada	Michael	Jacob	Christopher	Anthony	Daniel	Brandon	Austin	Tyler	Matthew	Joshua
New Hampshire	Nicholas	Tyler	Jacob	Matthew	Michael	Ryan	Zachary	Andrew	Kyle	Christopher, Joshua
New Jersey	Michael	Matthew	Nicholas	Christopher	Joseph	Anthony	Daniel	John	Andrew	Ryan
New Mexico	Joshua	Christopher	Matthew	Jacob	Michael	Daniel	Joseph	Brandon	Anthony	Andrew
New York	Michael	Matthew	Christopher	Nicholas	Joseph	Daniel	Anthony	Brandon	Joshua	John
North Carolina	Christopher	Joshua	Michael	Jacob, William	Matthew	Austin	Brandon	James	Zachary	Tyler
North Dakota	Austin	Jacob	Zachary	Tyler	Michael	Nicholas	Alexander	Matthew	Jordan	Cody
Ohio	Jacob	Michael	Austin	Nicholas	Tyler	Andrew	Matthew	Brandon	Zachary	Joshua
Oklahoma	Jacob	Tyler	Austin	Joshua	Michael	Christopher	Matthew	Zachary	Brandon	Andrew
Oregon	Jacob	Austin	Michael	Andrew	Tyler	Joshua	Zachary	Matthew	Nicholas	Brandon
Pennsylvania	Michael	Matthew	Nicholas	Jacob	Tyler	Joshua	Ryan	Zachary	Joseph	Andrew
Rhode Island	Michael	Nicholas	Matthew	Christopher	Tyler	Andrew	Kyle	Ryan	Jacob, Joseph	Joshua
South Carolina	William	Christopher	Joshua	Michael	Austin	James	Jacob	Brandon	Matthew	John
South Dakota	Jacob	Austin	Michael	Tyler	Matthew	Zachary	Andrew	Cody	Dylan, Joshua	Nicholas, Tanner
Tennessee	Jacob	Austin	William	Joshua	Michael	James	Christopher	Matthew	Brandon	John
Texas	Jose	Michael	Christopher	Jacob	Joshua	Matthew	David	Daniel	Jonathan	Brandon
Utah	Jacob	Joshua	Tyler	Austin	Michael	Zachary	Matthew	Andrew	Nathan	Jordan
Vermont	Jacob	Nicholas	Ryan	Tyler	Matthew	Joshua	Kyle	Michael	Brandon	Dylan
Virginia	Michael	Matthew	Jacob	Christopher	William	Joshua	James	John	Nicholas	Tyler
Washington	Jacob	Michael	Austin	Andrew	Joshua	Tyler	Alexander	Matthew	Daniel	Nicholas
West Virginia	Jacob	Austin, Brandon	Tyler	Michael	Christopher	Joshua	Zachary	Matthew	James	Andrew
Wisconsin	Jacob	Austin	Michael	Tyler	Matthew	Nicholas	Zachary	Joshua	Alexander	Andrew
Wyoming	Jacob	Austin	Tyler	Michael	Cody	Andrew, Christopher, William	Zachary	Anthony, Brandon, Joshua	Matthew, Nicholas	Justin

Female names
Region	No. 1	No. 2	No. 3	No. 4	No. 5	No. 6	No. 7	No. 8	No. 9	No. 10
Alabama	Hannah	Emily	Ashley	Sarah	Taylor	Madison	Jessica	Alexis	Anna	Kayla
Alaska	Hannah	Emily	Sarah	Megan	Jessica, Taylor	Ashley, Samantha	Madison	Abigail, Alyssa, Rachel	Emma	Amanda, Elizabeth, Katherine, Shelby
Arizona	Jessica	Alexis	Ashley	Samantha	Emily	Sarah	Taylor	Hannah	Jennifer	Alyssa
Arkansas	Hannah	Emily	Madison	Ashley	Sarah	Taylor	Brittany	Lauren	Jessica	Haley
California	Jessica	Jennifer	Ashley	Emily	Samantha	Sarah	Stephanie	Elizabeth, Vanessa	Alexis	Maria
Colorado	Hannah	Emily	Jessica	Sarah	Madison	Samantha	Taylor	Ashley	Megan	Elizabeth
Connecticut	Emily	Sarah	Samantha	Ashley	Taylor	Amanda	Jessica	Julia	Megan, Nicole	Olivia
Delaware	Emily	Sarah, Taylor	Alexis	Jessica	Samantha	Lauren, Rachel	Hannah	Brianna	Ashley, Morgan	Rebecca
District of Columbia	Jasmine	Alexis	Kayla	Sarah	Katherine	Taylor	Hannah	Jessica	Ashley, Elizabeth	Diamond
Florida	Ashley	Jessica	Emily	Samantha	Taylor	Sarah	Alexis	Hannah	Kayla	Amanda
Georgia	Hannah	Emily	Taylor	Sarah	Ashley	Jessica	Alexis	Madison	Kayla	Brittany
Hawaii	Taylor	Kayla	Jessica	Rachel	Alyssa	Ashley, Jasmine, Sarah	Samantha	Nicole	Kiana	Megan
Idaho	Emily	Madison	Hannah	Jessica	Ashley	Taylor	Sarah	Samantha	Megan	Alexis
Illinois	Emily	Jessica	Samantha	Hannah	Sarah	Alexis	Ashley	Taylor	Elizabeth	Megan
Indiana	Emily	Hannah	Taylor	Madison	Alexis, Samantha	Sarah	Ashley	Jessica	Megan	Elizabeth
Iowa	Emily	Taylor	Hannah	Madison	Megan	Samantha	Jessica	Elizabeth	Ashley	Sarah
Kansas	Emily	Madison	Hannah	Taylor	Ashley	Alexis	Jessica	Sarah	Elizabeth	Samantha
Kentucky	Hannah	Emily	Taylor	Sarah	Ashley	Madison	Brittany	Kayla	Samantha	Alexis
Louisiana	Alexis	Taylor	Emily	Hannah	Sarah	Madison	Victoria	Ashley	Kayla	Brittany
Maine	Emily	Hannah	Sarah	Taylor	Abigail	Samantha	Megan	Ashley	Elizabeth	Olivia
Maryland	Emily	Taylor	Sarah	Samantha	Hannah	Kayla	Ashley	Rachel	Alexis	Megan
Massachusetts	Emily	Samantha	Sarah	Jessica	Hannah	Julia	Nicole	Rachel	Ashley	Olivia
Michigan	Emily	Hannah	Samantha	Sarah	Taylor	Ashley	Jessica	Alexis	Rachel	Madison
Minnesota	Emily	Hannah	Samantha	Megan	Sarah	Taylor	Ashley	Elizabeth	Madison	Rachel
Mississippi	Hannah	Alexis, Ashley	Anna	Taylor	Emily, Jasmine	Kayla	Sarah	Madison	Jessica	Mary
Missouri	Emily	Hannah	Taylor	Madison	Ashley	Sarah	Jessica	Samantha	Megan	Alexis
Montana	Hannah	Madison	Ashley	Samantha	Emily	Megan	Kayla, Sarah	Jessica	Rachel	Brooke
Nebraska	Emily	Hannah	Taylor	Madison	Megan	Elizabeth	Ashley	Jessica, Samantha	Sarah	Alexis
Nevada	Taylor	Jessica	Ashley	Samantha	Alexis	Emily	Hannah	Alyssa	Elizabeth	Jennifer
New Hampshire	Emily	Hannah	Sarah	Samantha	Ashley	Jessica	Elizabeth	Olivia	Abigail	Madison
New Jersey	Emily	Samantha	Jessica	Nicole	Ashley	Amanda	Sarah	Rachel	Brianna	Taylor
New Mexico	Ashley	Alexis	Samantha	Mariah	Jessica	Sarah	Alyssa	Brianna	Jasmine, Victoria	Emily
New York	Samantha	Emily	Ashley	Jessica	Sarah	Nicole	Amanda	Brianna	Taylor	Rachel
North Carolina	Hannah	Sarah	Emily	Taylor	Ashley	Jessica	Kayla	Madison	Brittany	Alexis
North Dakota	Emily	Hannah	Madison	Samantha	Taylor	Megan	Alexis	Ashley	Sarah	Elizabeth, Kayla, Morgan
Ohio	Emily	Taylor	Hannah	Samantha	Sarah	Ashley	Alexis	Jessica	Megan	Madison
Oklahoma	Taylor	Madison	Emily	Hannah	Jessica	Sarah	Ashley	Rachel	Samantha	Lauren, Morgan
Oregon	Emily	Hannah	Jessica	Sarah	Madison	Taylor	Ashley	Elizabeth	Samantha	Megan
Pennsylvania	Emily	Sarah	Samantha	Taylor	Jessica	Hannah	Rachel	Alexis	Ashley	Elizabeth, Megan
Rhode Island	Emily	Samantha	Sarah	Jessica	Nicole	Ashley, Victoria	Hannah	Olivia	Taylor	Alexandra
South Carolina	Hannah	Taylor	Sarah	Alexis	Ashley	Emily	Jessica	Madison	Brittany	Kayla
South Dakota	Hannah, Samantha	Emily, Taylor	Ashley	Morgan	Megan	Alexis, Madison	Jessica	Brianna, Elizabeth, Rachel	Alyssa, Amanda	Sydney
Tennessee	Hannah	Emily	Sarah, Taylor	Ashley	Kayla	Jessica	Madison	Alexis	Elizabeth	Brittany
Texas	Ashley	Emily	Jessica	Sarah	Alexis	Jennifer	Hannah	Samantha	Victoria	Taylor
Utah	Madison	Jessica	Emily	Hannah	Sarah	Samantha	Megan	Ashley	Alexis	Rachel, Taylor
Vermont	Emily	Samantha, Taylor	Hannah	Sarah	Abigail	Elizabeth, Olivia	Ashley, Megan	Jessica	Brooke, Nicole, Rachel	Courtney
Virginia	Emily	Sarah	Hannah	Taylor	Ashley	Alexis	Jessica	Kayla	Rachel	Samantha
Washington	Emily	Hannah	Sarah	Jessica	Samantha	Madison	Megan	Ashley	Taylor	Elizabeth
West Virginia	Emily	Hannah	Sarah	Taylor	Samantha	Ashley	Jessica	Megan, Morgan	Madison	Courtney
Wisconsin	Emily	Hannah	Samantha	Megan	Elizabeth	Taylor	Sarah	Rachel	Ashley	Kayla
Wyoming	Emily, Taylor	Hannah	Samantha	Jessica	Ashley	Jordan, Megan	Bailey, Elizabeth, Sarah, Sierra	Morgan	Alexis, Madison	Courtney

== 1998 ==
Male names
Region	No. 1	No. 2	No. 3	No. 4	No. 5	No. 6	No. 7	No. 8	No. 9	No. 10
Alabama	William	Jacob	Austin	Christopher	Joshua	James	Michael	John	Brandon	Matthew
Alaska	Michael	Jacob	Joshua	Brandon	David, Joseph	Matthew	Andrew	James	Austin	Daniel
Arizona	Jacob	Michael	Jose	Daniel	Anthony	Christopher	Joshua	David	Matthew	Joseph
Arkansas	Jacob	Austin	Joshua, Michael	Christopher	Tyler	James	William	Matthew	Brandon	Hunter, John
California	Daniel	Jose	Michael	Anthony	Jacob	David	Matthew	Andrew	Christopher	Joshua
Colorado	Jacob	Michael	Joshua	Matthew	Tyler	Nicholas	Daniel	Brandon	Joseph	Austin
Connecticut	Michael	Matthew	Nicholas	Christopher	Ryan	Andrew	Joseph	Tyler	John	Daniel
Delaware	Michael	Tyler	Matthew	Joshua	Christopher	Ryan	William	Nicholas	James	Jacob
District of Columbia	Michael	Christopher	John, William	Matthew	David	Daniel, Joshua	James	Anthony	Kevin	Alexander, Nicholas
Florida	Michael	Christopher	Joshua	Matthew	Jacob	Nicholas	Brandon	Daniel	Tyler	Austin
Georgia	William	Michael	Christopher	Joshua	Jacob	Austin	Matthew	James	Brandon	John
Hawaii	Joshua	Matthew	Noah	Austin, Christian, Jacob	Brandon	Christopher, Justin	Tyler	Michael	Nicholas	Isaiah, Micah
Idaho	Jacob	Michael	Austin	Tyler	Joshua	Matthew	Andrew	Ryan	Zachary	Ethan
Illinois	Michael	Jacob	Matthew	Nicholas	Daniel	Joshua	Joseph	Andrew	Brandon	Christopher
Indiana	Jacob	Austin	Michael	Tyler	Matthew	Zachary	Andrew	Nicholas	Joshua	Brandon
Iowa	Jacob	Austin	Tyler	Matthew	Nicholas, Zachary	Brandon	Andrew	Michael	Noah	Joshua
Kansas	Jacob	Austin	Matthew	Zachary	Michael	Tyler	Joshua	Andrew	Nicholas	Christopher
Kentucky	Jacob	Austin	William	James	Matthew	Michael	Christopher	Zachary	Joshua	Brandon
Louisiana	Jacob	Joshua	Michael	Austin	Christopher	Tyler	Matthew	Nicholas	Brandon	John
Maine	Jacob	Nicholas	Tyler	Matthew	Joshua	Michael	Zachary	Noah	Benjamin	Alexander
Maryland	Michael	Jacob	Matthew	Nicholas	Joshua	Ryan	Christopher	John	Tyler	William
Massachusetts	Michael	Matthew	Nicholas	John	Ryan	Christopher	Jacob	Daniel	Joseph	Andrew
Michigan	Jacob	Michael	Joshua	Austin	Nicholas	Tyler	Matthew	Brandon	Andrew	Zachary
Minnesota	Jacob	Matthew	Nicholas	Tyler	Andrew	Michael	Samuel	Austin	Zachary	Benjamin
Mississippi	James	William	Christopher	Austin, Joshua	Michael	John	Jacob	Brandon	Matthew	Robert
Missouri	Jacob	Austin	Tyler	Michael	Nicholas	Matthew	Zachary	Andrew	Joshua	Joseph
Montana	Jacob	Austin	Michael	Tyler	Cody, Joshua	Hunter	Brandon	Andrew, Nicholas	Matthew	Joseph, Ryan
Nebraska	Jacob	Austin	Tyler	Michael	Zachary	Matthew	Andrew	Joshua	Nicholas	Brandon, Ryan
Nevada	Michael	Jacob	Anthony	Brandon	Matthew	Christopher	Tyler	Daniel, Joshua	Jonathan	Joseph
New Hampshire	Jacob	Matthew	Nicholas	Michael	Tyler	Ryan	Zachary	Joshua	Andrew	Kyle
New Jersey	Michael	Matthew	Nicholas	Christopher	Joseph	Daniel	Anthony	John	Ryan	Justin
New Mexico	Michael	Joshua	Jacob	Matthew	Joseph	Christopher	Daniel	Brandon	Anthony	David
New York	Michael	Matthew	Nicholas	Christopher	Joseph	Daniel	Anthony	Justin	Brandon	Joshua
North Carolina	William	Jacob	Joshua	Christopher	Michael	Austin	Matthew	Brandon	James	Nicholas
North Dakota	Jacob	Matthew	Austin	Tyler	Zachary	Dylan, Michael	Joshua	Hunter	Nicholas	Cole
Ohio	Jacob	Michael	Austin	Nicholas	Matthew	Tyler	Andrew	Joshua	Zachary	Brandon
Oklahoma	Jacob	Austin	Joshua	Tyler	Michael	Matthew	Zachary	Christopher	William	James
Oregon	Jacob	Austin	Joshua	Tyler	Michael	Andrew	Ryan	Daniel	David	Nicholas, Zachary
Pennsylvania	Michael	Matthew	Nicholas	Jacob	Tyler	Joshua	Ryan	Joseph	John	Zachary
Rhode Island	Matthew	Nicholas	Michael	Jacob	Zachary	Ryan	Andrew	Christopher, Joshua	Tyler	Kyle
South Carolina	William	Michael	Christopher	Joshua	Jacob	James	Austin	Matthew	Brandon	John
South Dakota	Austin	Jacob	Tyler	Matthew	Michael	Zachary	Nicholas	Andrew, Dylan	Hunter	Ethan
Tennessee	Jacob	William	Austin	Joshua	Michael	Christopher	Matthew	James	John	Tyler
Texas	Jose	Jacob	Michael	Christopher	Joshua	Matthew	David	Brandon	Jonathan	Daniel
Utah	Jacob	Joshua	Tyler	Austin	Michael	Matthew	Nathan	Andrew	Zachary	Jordan
Vermont	Jacob	Tyler	Matthew	Zachary	Nicholas	Joshua	Benjamin	Alexander, Ryan	Austin, Dylan	Brandon, Michael
Virginia	Jacob	Matthew	Michael	Joshua	William	Christopher	Nicholas	James	John	Austin
Washington	Jacob	Michael	Austin	Joshua	Andrew	Alexander	Tyler	Ryan	Daniel	Matthew
West Virginia	Jacob	Austin	Tyler	Brandon	Michael	Matthew	Zachary	Joshua	Christopher	William
Wisconsin	Jacob	Michael	Austin	Tyler	Nicholas	Matthew	Zachary	Brandon	Joshua	Andrew
Wyoming	Austin	Jacob	Matthew	Michael	Tyler	Christopher	William	Dylan	Brandon	Anthony, James

Female names
Region	No. 1	No. 2	No. 3	No. 4	No. 5	No. 6	No. 7	No. 8	No. 9	No. 10
Alabama	Hannah	Alexis	Emily	Madison	Taylor	Sarah	Ashley	Anna	Lauren	Jessica
Alaska	Emily	Sarah	Hannah	Megan	Alyssa	Ashley	Samantha	Madison	Jessica	Kayla
Arizona	Alexis	Samantha	Jessica	Emily	Ashley	Alyssa	Sarah	Taylor	Hannah	Madison
Arkansas	Hannah	Madison	Emily	Taylor	Sarah	Alexis	Jessica	Ashley, Haley	Lauren	Elizabeth, Kayla
California	Jessica	Ashley	Emily	Samantha	Jennifer	Sarah	Alexis	Vanessa	Alyssa	Stephanie
Colorado	Emily	Samantha	Hannah	Jessica	Madison	Sarah	Ashley	Taylor	Elizabeth	Alexis
Connecticut	Emily	Sarah	Samantha	Ashley	Julia	Jessica, Olivia	Nicole	Alyssa	Amanda	Elizabeth
Delaware	Emily	Taylor	Madison	Samantha, Sarah	Alexis	Hannah	Jessica	Kayla	Ashley, Olivia	Elizabeth, Morgan
District of Columbia	Alexis	Jasmine	Taylor	Kayla	Jessica	Ashley	Elizabeth, Olivia	Alexandra, Emma	Julia	Katherine, Sarah
Florida	Emily	Ashley	Alexis	Samantha	Jessica	Taylor	Sarah	Hannah	Kayla	Madison
Georgia	Hannah	Emily, Taylor	Madison	Alexis	Ashley	Sarah	Jessica	Elizabeth	Kayla	Brittany
Hawaii	Taylor	Kayla	Ashley	Jessica	Alyssa	Emily	Sarah	Rachel	Kiana	Alexis, Samantha
Idaho	Madison	Emily, Hannah	Samantha	Ashley	Jessica	Megan	Taylor	Alyssa	Hailey, Sarah	Elizabeth
Illinois	Emily	Samantha	Jessica	Alexis	Ashley	Hannah	Sarah	Taylor	Elizabeth	Alyssa
Indiana	Emily	Hannah	Alexis	Taylor	Madison	Sarah	Samantha	Ashley	Abigail	Megan
Iowa	Emily	Hannah	Taylor	Madison	Alexis	Megan	Samantha	Elizabeth	Emma	Ashley, Morgan
Kansas	Madison	Emily	Hannah	Taylor	Alexis	Ashley	Samantha	Sarah	Jessica	Lauren
Kentucky	Hannah	Emily	Madison	Sarah	Taylor	Alexis	Ashley	Shelby	Elizabeth	Brittany, Kayla, Morgan
Louisiana	Alexis	Taylor	Hannah	Madison	Emily	Sarah	Victoria	Kayla	Lauren	Ashley
Maine	Emily	Hannah	Sarah	Emma	Taylor	Ashley	Samantha	Abigail	Elizabeth	Alexis
Maryland	Emily	Taylor	Sarah	Alexis	Kayla	Hannah	Samantha	Jessica	Madison	Ashley
Massachusetts	Emily	Samantha	Sarah	Hannah	Julia	Olivia	Emma	Ashley	Jessica	Elizabeth
Michigan	Emily	Hannah	Alexis	Samantha	Taylor	Madison	Sarah	Ashley	Megan	Jessica
Minnesota	Emily	Hannah	Samantha	Madison	Megan	Emma, Taylor	Elizabeth	Sarah	Anna	Alexis
Mississippi	Alexis	Hannah	Madison	Taylor	Anna	Emily	Ashley	Destiny	Sarah	Jasmine
Missouri	Emily	Hannah	Madison	Taylor	Samantha	Alexis	Sarah	Ashley	Jessica	Megan
Montana	Emily	Madison	Hannah	Ashley	Jessica	Taylor	Abigail	Samantha	Sarah	Shelby
Nebraska	Emily, Hannah	Madison	Alexis	Taylor	Megan	Samantha	Elizabeth	Ashley	Jessica	Morgan
Nevada	Jessica	Samantha	Emily	Alexis, Ashley	Taylor	Madison	Sarah	Hannah	Kayla	Alyssa
New Hampshire	Emily	Hannah	Sarah	Madison	Samantha	Ashley	Taylor	Abigail, Emma	Alexis, Megan, Olivia	Brianna, Rebecca
New Jersey	Samantha	Emily	Ashley	Nicole	Jessica	Sarah	Amanda	Brianna	Julia	Alexis
New Mexico	Ashley	Alyssa	Alexis	Samantha	Jessica	Mariah	Victoria	Brianna	Hannah	Sarah, Savannah
New York	Samantha	Emily	Ashley	Jessica	Sarah	Nicole	Amanda	Brianna	Victoria	Kayla
North Carolina	Hannah	Taylor	Sarah	Emily	Madison	Ashley	Alexis	Kayla	Jessica	Elizabeth
North Dakota	Emily	Madison	Taylor	Hannah	Alexis	Megan	Sarah	Samantha	Ashley	Elizabeth
Ohio	Emily	Taylor	Hannah	Alexis	Madison	Samantha	Sarah	Ashley	Megan	Elizabeth
Oklahoma	Hannah	Emily	Madison	Taylor	Jessica	Alexis, Ashley	Sarah	Lauren	Morgan	Elizabeth
Oregon	Emily	Hannah	Madison	Emma	Jessica	Samantha	Ashley, Sarah	Alexis	Megan	Taylor
Pennsylvania	Emily	Sarah	Samantha	Hannah	Madison	Taylor	Alexis	Ashley	Rachel	Alyssa
Rhode Island	Emily	Samantha	Hannah	Victoria	Madison, Sarah	Alexis, Ashley	Elizabeth	Jessica	Amanda, Brianna, Emma	Olivia, Taylor
South Carolina	Hannah	Taylor	Alexis	Emily	Ashley	Sarah	Madison	Kayla	Elizabeth	Jessica
South Dakota	Emily	Hannah	Taylor	Madison	Samantha	Morgan	Alexis, Megan	Ashley	Bailey, Sydney	Brooke, Sarah
Tennessee	Hannah	Emily	Madison	Alexis	Sarah	Taylor	Kayla	Ashley	Jessica	Brittany
Texas	Emily	Ashley	Alexis	Samantha	Sarah	Victoria	Hannah	Jessica	Jennifer	Madison
Utah	Madison	Emily	Hannah	Sarah	Samantha	Megan	Jessica	Alexis	Ashley	Abigail
Vermont	Emily	Hannah	Taylor	Sarah	Madison	Abigail, Megan, Olivia	Emma	Samantha	Alexis	Ashley
Virginia	Emily	Hannah	Sarah	Taylor	Alexis	Madison	Kayla	Jessica	Ashley	Elizabeth
Washington	Emily	Hannah	Madison	Samantha	Taylor	Sarah	Emma	Jessica	Alexis	Ashley
West Virginia	Hannah	Emily	Taylor	Madison	Ashley	Alexis	Brittany, Kayla	Megan	Sarah	Samantha
Wisconsin	Emily	Hannah	Samantha	Alexis	Elizabeth	Megan	Ashley	Taylor	Sarah	Alyssa
Wyoming	Madison	Taylor	Sarah	Ashley	Emily, Hannah, Jessica	Alexis	Morgan	Bailey	Samantha	Alyssa, Haley

== 1999 ==
Male names
Region	No. 1	No. 2	No. 3	No. 4	No. 5	No. 6	No. 7	No. 8	No. 9	No. 10
Alabama	William	Jacob	Christopher	Austin	John	Joshua	James	Michael	Andrew	Matthew
Alaska	Jacob	Joshua	Michael	Tyler	Dylan	Joseph, Matthew	Alexander	Christopher, John	Ryan	David
Arizona	Joseph	Michael	Jose	Daniel	Christopher	Joshua	David	Anthony	Matthew	Nicholas
Arkansas	Jacob	William	Matthew	Austin	Michael	Joshua	Christopher	Tyler	Hunter	James
California	Daniel	Jose	Anthony	Michael	Andrew	David	Jacob	Matthew	Christopher	Joshua
Colorado	Jacob	Michael	Joshua	Matthew	Nicholas	Tyler	Daniel	Joseph	Andrew	Ryan
Connecticut	Matthew	Michael	Nicholas	Christopher	John	Ryan	Jacob	Joseph	Andrew	William
Delaware	Michael	Joshua	Ryan	Matthew	Andrew	Nicholas	Tyler	Jacob	Zachary	John
District of Columbia	Michael	William	Christopher	John	David, James, Matthew	Alexander	Joshua, Kevin	Nicholas	Anthony	Benjamin
Florida	Michael	Joshua	Christopher	Matthew	Jacob	Nicholas	Daniel	Brandon	Tyler	Austin
Georgia	William	Jacob	Joshua	Michael	Christopher	Austin	Matthew	James	John	Brandon
Hawaii	Joshua	Noah	Justin	Dylan, Tyler	Matthew	Isaiah	Christopher, Michael	Jacob	Christian	Andrew
Idaho	Jacob	Tyler	Austin	Michael	Matthew	Joshua	Andrew	Zachary	Nicholas	Ryan
Illinois	Michael	Jacob	Matthew	Daniel	Nicholas	Joseph	Joshua	Andrew	Ryan	Tyler
Indiana	Jacob	Austin	Tyler	Nicholas	Michael	Andrew	Matthew	Zachary	Joshua	Noah
Iowa	Jacob	Austin	Tyler	Nicholas	Zachary	Andrew	Brandon	Joseph, Michael	Matthew	Noah
Kansas	Jacob	Austin	Joshua	Michael	Matthew	Tyler	Andrew	Nicholas	Ryan	Christopher
Kentucky	Jacob	Austin	William	James	Matthew	Michael	Zachary	Christopher	Tyler	Joshua
Louisiana	Joshua	Jacob	Christopher	Michael	Tyler	Austin	Matthew	Cameron	Nicholas	Dylan
Maine	Jacob	Nicholas	Tyler	Zachary	Matthew	Cameron	Benjamin	Noah	Joshua	Christopher
Maryland	Michael	Matthew	Jacob	Joshua	Ryan	Nicholas	John	Christopher	Andrew	William
Massachusetts	Matthew	Michael	Nicholas	John	Ryan	Andrew	Jacob	Joseph	Christopher	Daniel
Michigan	Jacob	Michael	Nicholas	Tyler	Joshua	Andrew, Matthew	Austin	Zachary	Joseph	Brandon
Minnesota	Jacob	Nicholas	Matthew	Benjamin	Andrew	Tyler	Austin, Zachary	Samuel	Michael	Joseph
Mississippi	William	James	Christopher	Joshua	Michael	John	Jacob	Austin	Brandon	Tyler
Missouri	Jacob	Austin	Andrew	Matthew	Michael	Tyler	Zachary	Nicholas	Joshua	William
Montana	Tyler	Jacob	Michael	Matthew	Ryan	Dylan	Austin	Andrew, Joseph	Justin	Hunter
Nebraska	Jacob	Tyler	Austin	Joshua	Michael	Dylan	Zachary	Nicholas	Matthew	Andrew
Nevada	Jacob	Michael	Anthony	Joshua	Tyler	Daniel, Matthew	Christopher	Brandon	Joseph	Ryan
New Hampshire	Jacob	Matthew	Nicholas	Tyler	Ryan	Michael	Christopher	Andrew	Zachary	Kyle
New Jersey	Michael	Matthew	Nicholas	Christopher	Joseph	Ryan	Daniel	John	Anthony	Andrew
New Mexico	Jacob	Joshua	Michael	Matthew	Isaiah	Daniel	Joseph	Christopher	Brandon	Anthony
New York	Michael	Matthew	Nicholas	Joseph	Christopher	Daniel	Anthony	Justin	John	Ryan
North Carolina	Jacob	Joshua	William	Christopher	Michael	Matthew	Austin	James	Brandon	Nicholas
North Dakota	Jacob	Dylan, Hunter, Tyler	Zachary	Austin	Matthew, Michael	Joshua	Nicholas	Noah	Ethan	Brandon
Ohio	Jacob	Michael	Austin	Nicholas	Tyler	Matthew	Andrew	Zachary	Joshua	Brandon
Oklahoma	Jacob	Joshua	Tyler	Matthew	Michael	Christopher	Austin	William	Hunter, Zachary	Joseph
Oregon	Jacob	Michael	Austin, Joshua	Tyler	Andrew	Matthew	Zachary	Daniel	Dylan, Samuel	Alexander
Pennsylvania	Michael	Matthew	Nicholas	Jacob	Ryan	Tyler	Joshua	Joseph	Zachary	John
Rhode Island	Matthew	Nicholas	Michael	Jacob	Zachary	Ryan	Christopher	John	Joseph, Tyler	Joshua
South Carolina	William	Joshua	Jacob	Michael	James	Christopher	Austin	Matthew	Nicholas	John
South Dakota	Jacob	Austin	Tyler	Dylan	Logan	Noah	Matthew	Andrew	Brandon, Joshua	Michael
Tennessee	Jacob	William	Austin	Joshua	James	Christopher	Michael	Matthew	Tyler	Brandon
Texas	Jose	Jacob	Michael	Christopher	Joshua	Matthew	Daniel	Juan	David	Brandon
Utah	Jacob	Joshua	Tyler	Zachary	Michael	Matthew	Nathan	Benjamin	Hunter	Samuel
Vermont	Jacob	Nicholas	Matthew	Dylan	Ryan	Michael	Zachary	Joshua	Kyle	Hunter
Virginia	Jacob	Michael	William	Matthew	Christopher	Joshua	John	Andrew	James	John
Washington	Jacob	Michael	Joshua	Andrew	Alexander	Matthew	Austin	Ryan, Tyler	Daniel	David
West Virginia	Jacob	Austin	Tyler	Matthew	Joshua	Michael	James	Brandon	Christopher	Zachary
Wisconsin	Jacob	Austin	Michael	Tyler	Matthew	Nicholas	Ryan	Joshua	Zachary	Andrew
Wyoming	Michael	Austin	Tyler	Joshua	Jacob	Ryan	Cody, James, Matthew, William, Zachary	Aaron, Andrew, Brandon, Nathan	Ethan, Justin	Benjamin, Dylan, Joseph, Kyle

Female names
Region	No. 1	No. 2	No. 3	No. 4	No. 5	No. 6	No. 7	No. 8	No. 9	No. 10
Alabama	Hannah	Emily	Madison	Alexis	Anna	Taylor	Sarah	Mary	Elizabeth	Ashley
Alaska	Emily	Hannah	Ashley	Sarah	Elizabeth, Jessica, Taylor	Alexis, Madison	Emma	Samantha, Sierra	Grace	Brianna, Victoria
Arizona	Samantha	Alexis	Emily	Ashley	Alyssa	Jessica	Hannah	Taylor	Jennifer	Madison, Victoria
Arkansas	Hannah	Madison	Emily	Sarah	Taylor	Ashley	Alexis	Lauren	Haley	Jessica
California	Emily	Samantha	Jennifer	Ashley	Jessica	Alyssa	Alexis	Sarah	Elizabeth	Vanessa
Colorado	Hannah	Emily	Madison	Sarah	Jessica	Samantha	Ashley	Taylor	Alexis	Emma
Connecticut	Emily	Sarah	Samantha	Julia	Emma	Ashley, Olivia	Jessica	Hannah	Alyssa	Elizabeth
Delaware	Emily	Alexis	Sarah	Madison	Taylor	Kayla	Elizabeth, Samantha	Jessica	Hannah	Ashley
District of Columbia	Kayla	Jasmine	Taylor	Destiny	Sarah	Lauren	Emily	Diamond	Ashley, Jessica	Olivia
Florida	Emily	Ashley	Samantha	Sarah	Alexis	Hannah	Taylor	Victoria	Kayla	Jessica
Georgia	Emily	Hannah	Taylor	Madison	Alexis	Sarah	Ashley	Jessica	Elizabeth	Kayla
Hawaii	Taylor	Kayla	Jasmine	Ashley	Alyssa, Sarah	Emily	Jessica	Lauren	Madison, Nicole	Alexis
Idaho	Emily	Hannah	Madison	Megan	Taylor	Alexis	Hailey, Jessica	Ashley	Emma	Samantha
Illinois	Emily	Hannah	Jessica	Samantha	Alexis	Elizabeth	Sarah	Ashley	Taylor	Lauren
Indiana	Hannah	Emily	Alexis	Madison	Taylor	Sarah	Abigail	Elizabeth	Samantha	Olivia
Iowa	Emily	Madison	Hannah	Alexis	Taylor	Emma	Samantha	Megan	Elizabeth	Sarah
Kansas	Madison	Emily	Hannah	Taylor	Alexis	Abigail	Ashley	Sarah	Elizabeth	Samantha
Kentucky	Hannah	Emily	Madison	Sarah	Haley	Alexis	Taylor	Ashley	Elizabeth	Lauren
Louisiana	Hannah	Alexis	Madison	Emily	Taylor	Victoria	Sarah	Ashley	Lauren	Destiny
Maine	Emily	Hannah	Emma	Sarah	Samantha	Elizabeth	Abigail, Alexis	Madison, Taylor	Brianna	Ashley
Maryland	Emily	Sarah	Taylor	Hannah	Kayla	Samantha	Alexis	Madison	Jessica	Rachel
Massachusetts	Emily	Sarah	Olivia	Samantha	Julia	Hannah	Elizabeth	Emma	Jessica	Ashley
Michigan	Emily	Hannah	Alexis	Madison	Samantha	Taylor	Sarah	Ashley	Lauren	Megan
Minnesota	Emily	Samantha	Hannah	Emma	Madison	Elizabeth, Megan	Grace	Anna	Taylor	Alexis
Mississippi	Madison	Hannah	Alexis	Anna	Emily	Destiny	Jasmine	Sarah	Taylor	Ashley, Kayla
Missouri	Emily	Hannah	Madison	Taylor	Alexis	Elizabeth	Sarah	Samantha	Lauren	Abigail
Montana	Madison	Emily	Hannah	Taylor	Alexis, Megan	Emma	Sarah	Elizabeth	Samantha, Sydney	Ashley, Sierra
Nebraska	Emily	Hannah	Madison	Samantha	Taylor	Emma	Alexis	Elizabeth, Sarah	Megan	Jessica
Nevada	Samantha	Taylor	Emily	Ashley, Madison	Jessica	Alexis, Jennifer	Hannah	Alyssa	Megan	Sarah
New Hampshire	Emily	Hannah	Sarah	Samantha	Emma, Olivia	Madison	Abigail	Brianna	Alexis	Elizabeth
New Jersey	Emily	Samantha	Sarah	Jessica	Nicole	Ashley	Amanda	Kayla	Julia	Alyssa
New Mexico	Alexis	Alyssa	Destiny	Ashley, Brianna	Samantha	Emily	Hannah	Jasmine	Jessica	Mariah, Victoria
New York	Emily	Samantha	Ashley	Sarah	Jessica	Nicole	Brianna, Kayla	Amanda	Julia	Victoria
North Carolina	Hannah	Sarah	Emily	Madison	Taylor	Alexis	Ashley	Elizabeth	Kayla	Jessica
North Dakota	Hannah	Madison	Emily	Alexis	Taylor	Grace	Megan	Emma	Morgan, Samantha	Ashley, Jessica
Ohio	Hannah	Emily	Alexis	Madison	Taylor	Sarah	Abigail	Samantha	Olivia	Ashley
Oklahoma	Madison	Hannah	Emily	Taylor	Alexis	Sarah	Elizabeth	Ashley	Lauren	Megan
Oregon	Emily	Hannah	Emma	Jessica	Madison	Samantha	Sarah	Taylor	Elizabeth	Ashley
Pennsylvania	Emily	Sarah	Hannah	Madison	Alexis	Samantha	Taylor	Ashley	Elizabeth	Rachel
Rhode Island	Emily	Samantha	Hannah, Sarah	Madison	Victoria	Ashley, Julia	Alexis, Elizabeth	Emma	Taylor	Amanda, Rachel
South Carolina	Hannah	Emily	Alexis	Taylor	Sarah	Madison	Elizabeth	Destiny	Kayla	Ashley
South Dakota	Alexis	Hannah	Emily	Madison	Taylor	Rachel, Samantha	Ashley	Elizabeth	Sydney	Grace, Morgan
Tennessee	Hannah	Emily	Madison	Sarah	Taylor	Alexis	Ashley	Lauren	Elizabeth	Kayla
Texas	Emily	Alexis	Ashley	Samantha	Hannah	Victoria	Alyssa	Madison	Sarah	Jennifer
Utah	Emily	Madison	Hannah	Samantha	Sarah	Megan	Emma	Jessica	Alexis	Rachel
Vermont	Hannah	Emily	Emma	Olivia, Taylor	Alexis, Elizabeth	Sarah	Madison	Abigail	Lauren, Samantha	Ashley, Rebecca
Virginia	Emily	Hannah	Sarah	Taylor	Alexis	Madison	Ashley	Elizabeth	Kayla	Jessica
Washington	Emily	Hannah	Samantha	Madison	Jessica	Taylor	Emma	Alexis	Elizabeth, Sarah	Ashley
West Virginia	Hannah	Madison	Emily	Alexis	Taylor	Sarah	Ashley	Haley	Morgan	Megan
Wisconsin	Emily	Hannah	Alexis	Taylor	Megan	Samantha	Elizabeth	Emma	Abigail	Sarah
Wyoming	Taylor	Hannah	Madison	Emily, Samantha	Elizabeth	Sierra	Alexis, Ashley	Brianna	Emma, Rachel	Kaylee

== 2000 ==
Male names
Region	No. 1	No. 2	No. 3	No. 4	No. 5	No. 6	No. 7	No. 8	No. 9	No. 10
Alabama	William	Jacob	Joshua	Christopher, Michael	James	John	Matthew	Austin	Tyler	Andrew
Alaska	Michael	Jacob	William	Joshua	James	Andrew	Brandon, Matthew	Zachary	Daniel, Joseph	John
Arizona	Jacob	Michael	Daniel	Jose	Anthony	Joshua	Jesus	Matthew	David	Andrew, Joseph
Arkansas	Jacob	William	Michael	Joshua	Christopher	Hunter	Brandon	Austin	James	Tyler
California	Daniel	Anthony	Jose	Andrew	Michael	Jacob	Joshua	Christopher	David	Matthew
Colorado	Jacob	Michael	Joshua	Matthew	Ryan	Nicholas	Tyler	Andrew	Joseph	Benjamin
Connecticut	Michael	Matthew	Nicholas	Christopher	Ryan	Jacob	John	Joshua	Joseph	William
Delaware	Michael	Matthew	Jacob	Joshua	Nicholas	Christopher	William	John	Ryan	Joseph
District of Columbia	John	Christopher	William	Michael	Anthony	David	Joshua	James	Alexander	Andrew
Florida	Michael	Joshua	Christopher	Matthew	Jacob	Nicholas	Daniel	Brandon	Tyler	Anthony
Georgia	William	Christopher	Jacob	Michael	Joshua	John	Matthew	James	Brandon	Andrew
Hawaii	Joshua	Noah	Jacob	Justin	Matthew	Michael	Dylan	Christian	Brandon	Isaiah
Idaho	Jacob	Joshua	Joseph, Michael	Ethan	Tyler	Matthew	Andrew, Hunter	Austin	Dylan	Nicholas
Illinois	Jacob	Michael	Matthew	Daniel	Nicholas	Joseph	Joshua	Anthony	Andrew	Ryan
Indiana	Jacob	Austin	Andrew	Michael	Zachary	Joshua, Matthew	Tyler	Nicholas	Ethan	Noah
Iowa	Jacob	Tyler	Austin	Zachary	Nicholas	Andrew	Hunter	Matthew	Dylan	Benjamin
Kansas	Jacob	Michael	Tyler	Joshua, Zachary	Andrew	Ethan	Matthew	Austin	Joseph	Dylan
Kentucky	Jacob	William	Austin	James	Michael	Matthew	Zachary	Joshua	Christopher	Tyler
Louisiana	Joshua	Jacob	Christopher	Michael	Tyler	Nicholas	Matthew	Cameron	John	Austin
Maine	Jacob	Nicholas	Joshua	Tyler	Matthew	Andrew, Zachary	Hunter	Benjamin, Michael	Noah	Cameron
Maryland	Michael	Joshua	Jacob	Matthew	Ryan	Nicholas	Andrew	Christopher, William	John	Joseph
Massachusetts	Matthew	Michael	John	Nicholas	Ryan	Joseph	Christopher	Jacob	Andrew	Benjamin
Michigan	Jacob	Joshua	Michael	Nicholas	Andrew	Tyler	Matthew	Zachary	Joseph	Ryan
Minnesota	Jacob	Nicholas	Matthew	Andrew	Samuel	Benjamin	Tyler	Zachary	Michael	Joseph
Mississippi	William	James	Christopher	Michael	Jacob	John	Joshua	Tyler	Joseph	Austin
Missouri	Jacob	Tyler	Michael	Matthew	Joshua	Nicholas	Austin	Andrew	Zachary	Joseph
Montana	Jacob	Tyler	Zachary	Michael	Dylan	Logan	Joseph	Daniel	Austin	Andrew, Joshua
Nebraska	Jacob	Tyler	Joshua	Zachary	Andrew	Nicholas	Matthew	Joseph	Michael	Ryan
Nevada	Jacob	Anthony	Joshua	Brandon	Daniel	Michael	Christopher	Tyler	Jose	Ryan
New Hampshire	Jacob	Matthew	Ryan	Nicholas	Michael	Zachary	Tyler	Benjamin	Joshua	Dylan
New Jersey	Michael	Matthew	Nicholas	Christopher	Joseph	Anthony	Ryan	John	Daniel	Justin
New Mexico	Jacob	Joshua, Michael	Isaiah	Matthew	Daniel	Anthony, Christopher	Joseph	Brandon	Gabriel	Jose
New York	Michael	Matthew	Nicholas	Christopher	Joseph	Anthony	Daniel	Justin	John	Joshua
North Carolina	William	Jacob	Joshua	Christopher	Michael	Matthew	James	Tyler	John	Nicholas
North Dakota	Jacob	Hunter	Ethan	Matthew	Austin, Tyler	Andrew, Dylan, Zachary	Logan, Nicholas	Mason	Michael	Alexander, Brandon, Christopher
Ohio	Jacob	Michael	Nicholas	Tyler	Andrew	Matthew	Joshua	Zachary	Joseph	Austin
Oklahoma	Jacob	Tyler	Joshua	Matthew	Michael	Christopher	Austin	Zachary	William	Ethan
Oregon	Jacob	Joshua	Michael	Daniel, Tyler	Andrew	Matthew	Nicholas	Austin	Ryan	Ethan, Zachary
Pennsylvania	Michael	Jacob	Matthew	Nicholas	Ryan	Tyler	Joshua	Joseph	John	Zachary
Rhode Island	Matthew	Michael	Nicholas	Jacob	Ryan, Zachary	Tyler	Andrew	Christopher	John	Joseph
South Carolina	William	Christopher	Jacob	Joshua	James	Michael	John	Matthew	Andrew	Brandon
South Dakota	Jacob	Dylan	Austin	Ethan	Nicholas, Tyler	Hunter	Zachary	Benjamin	Matthew, Nathan	Michael
Tennessee	Jacob	William	Joshua	Michael	Christopher	Matthew	Austin	Tyler	John	
Texas	Jose	Jacob	Joshua	Michael	Christopher	Daniel	Matthew	David	Juan	Jonathan
Utah	Jacob	Joshua	Ethan	Tyler, Zachary	Matthew, Michael	Andrew	Nathan	Hunter	Benjamin	Samuel
Vermont	Jacob	Matthew	Ryan	Michael	Tyler	Noah	Benjamin, Nicholas	Zachary	William	Samuel
Virginia	Jacob	William	Michael	Matthew	Christopher	Joshua	John	Nicholas	Andrew	James
Washington	Jacob	Michael	Joshua	Alexander	Tyler	Andrew	Matthew	Daniel	Ryan	Zachary
West Virginia	Jacob	Austin	Michael, Tyler	Joshua	Matthew, Zachary	Hunter	Andrew	Brandon	Christopher	Nicholas
Wisconsin	Jacob	Nicholas	Tyler	Michael	Andrew	Joshua	Matthew	Ryan	Benjamin	Samuel
Wyoming	Jacob	Michael	Ethan	Matthew	Hunter, Tyler, Zachary	Austin, Joshua, Nicholas	Andrew	David	Joseph	Justin

Female names
Region	No. 1	No. 2	No. 3	No. 4	No. 5	No. 6	No. 7	No. 8	No. 9	No. 10
Alabama	Hannah	Anna	Madison	Emily	Sarah	Alexis	Taylor	Mary	Elizabeth	Kayla
Alaska	Hannah	Madison	Emily	Sarah	Ashley	Anna	Elizabeth, Emma	Alyssa, Jessica	Abigail	Haley, Victoria
Arizona	Emily	Ashley	Samantha	Alexis	Jessica	Hannah	Madison	Alyssa	Jennifer	Brianna
Arkansas	Hannah	Madison	Emily	Alexis	Sarah	Lauren	Taylor	Haley	Ashley, Elizabeth	Abigail
California	Emily	Ashley	Samantha	Jessica	Jennifer	Alyssa	Alexis	Sarah	Hannah	Elizabeth
Colorado	Emily	Hannah	Madison	Ashley	Emma	Sarah	Jessica	Taylor	Lauren	Samantha
Connecticut	Emily	Sarah	Samantha	Olivia	Hannah	Julia	Ashley	Madison	Jessica	Emma
Delaware	Emily	Sarah	Kayla	Madison	Alexis	Lauren	Hannah, Taylor	Morgan	Jessica, Samantha	Brianna
District of Columbia	Kayla	Katherine	Elizabeth	Destiny	Jordan	Grace	Taylor	Alexandra, Sarah	Hannah, Jasmine, Julia, Olivia, Sydney	Emma, Lauren
Florida	Emily	Ashley	Hannah	Samantha	Sarah	Alexis	Madison	Taylor	Kayla	Brianna
Georgia	Hannah	Madison	Emily	Sarah	Taylor	Alexis	Ashley	Anna	Kayla	Lauren
Hawaii	Kayla, Taylor	Alyssa	Ashley	Kiana	Nicole	Alexis	Emily	Jasmine, Jessica	Rachel	Chloe, Madison, Sarah
Idaho	Hannah	Emily	Madison	Ashley	Hailey	Alexis	Megan	Samantha	Emma	Elizabeth, Sarah, Taylor
Illinois	Emily	Hannah	Alexis	Jessica	Samantha	Grace	Ashley	Elizabeth	Sarah	Madison
Indiana	Hannah	Madison	Emily	Alexis	Abigail	Taylor	Elizabeth	Olivia	Sarah	Emma
Iowa	Madison	Emily, Hannah	Emma	Alexis	Elizabeth	Taylor	Grace	Olivia, Sydney	Anna	Megan, Samantha
Kansas	Madison	Hannah	Emily	Taylor	Alexis	Elizabeth	Abigail	Emma	Lauren	Grace
Kentucky	Hannah	Madison	Emily	Sarah	Alexis	Haley	Taylor	Ashley	Elizabeth	Lauren
Louisiana	Madison	Hannah	Alexis	Emily	Taylor	Sarah	Destiny	Kayla	Lauren, Victoria	Alyssa
Maine	Emily	Hannah	Abigail	Samantha	Emma	Sarah	Alexis	Madison, Olivia	Grace	Lauren
Maryland	Emily	Kayla	Hannah	Sarah	Taylor	Madison	Alexis	Elizabeth	Jessica, Samantha	Abigail, Olivia
Massachusetts	Emily	Hannah	Olivia	Sarah	Julia	Emma	Samantha	Ashley	Abigail, Madison	Jessica
Michigan	Emily	Hannah	Madison	Alexis	Olivia	Lauren	Samantha	Sarah	Taylor	Kayla
Minnesota	Emily	Hannah	Grace	Emma	Elizabeth	Samantha	Madison	Anna	Megan	Lauren
Mississippi	Hannah	Madison	Anna	Destiny	Alexis	Taylor	Mary	Sarah	Elizabeth	
Missouri	Hannah	Emily	Madison	Taylor	Alexis	Grace	Abigail, Emma	Sarah	Lauren	Samantha
Montana	Madison	Emily	Taylor	Hannah	Abigail	Sarah	Elizabeth, Samantha	Hailey	Ashley, Emma	Olivia
Nebraska	Hannah	Madison	Emily	Taylor	Emma	Samantha	Alexis	Megan	Morgan	Grace
Nevada	Emily	Hannah	Madison	Jessica	Samantha	Ashley	Alexis	Alyssa	Taylor	Jennifer
New Hampshire	Emily	Hannah	Emma	Olivia	Sarah	Abigail, Madison	Elizabeth	Samantha	Alexis, Ashley	Taylor
New Jersey	Emily	Samantha	Nicole	Jessica	Sarah	Julia	Ashley	Brianna	Kayla	Lauren
New Mexico	Alexis	Alyssa	Destiny	Ashley, Brianna	Samantha	Emily	Hannah	Jasmine	Jessica	Mariah, Victoria
New York	Emily	Samantha	Ashley	Sarah	Jessica	Brianna	Kayla	Hannah	Nicole	Julia
North Carolina	Hannah	Madison	Emily	Sarah	Taylor	Elizabeth	Ashley	Kayla	Alexis	Lauren
North Dakota	Madison	Alexis	Hannah	Emily	Taylor	Ashley	Grace, Megan	Morgan, Sydney	Abigail	Olivia
Ohio	Hannah	Emily	Madison	Alexis	Taylor	Olivia	Sarah	Abigail	Samantha	Lauren
Oklahoma	Madison	Emily	Hannah	Taylor	Sarah	Alexis	Ashley	Lauren	Jessica	Abigail
Oregon	Emily	Hannah	Madison	Emma	Ashley	Jessica	Samantha	Elizabeth, Sarah	Olivia	Alexis, Grace
Pennsylvania	Emily	Madison	Hannah	Sarah	Alexis	Samantha	Taylor	Lauren	Olivia	Alyssa
Rhode Island	Emily	Hannah	Sarah	Madison	Victoria	Ashley	Olivia	Elizabeth	Samantha	Emma, Julia
South Carolina	Hannah	Madison	Emily	Alexis	Taylor	Sarah	Destiny	Elizabeth	Kayla	Lauren
South Dakota	Hannah	Emily	Morgan	Taylor	Grace	Madison	Ashley, Sydney	Emma	Abigail	Alexis, Megan
Tennessee	Hannah	Madison	Emily	Sarah	Alexis	Taylor	Ashley	Anna	Haley	Elizabeth
Texas	Emily	Ashley	Hannah	Alexis	Madison	Samantha	Alyssa	Brianna	Jessica	Sarah
Utah	Madison	Emily	Hannah	Abigail	Samantha	Jessica	Emma	Megan	Alexis	Sarah
Vermont	Emily	Olivia	Abigail	Emma, Hannah	Madison	Elizabeth, Samantha	Brianna, Grace	Taylor	Alexis, Sarah	Anna
Virginia	Hannah	Emily	Sarah	Madison	Alexis	Elizabeth	Ashley	Kayla	Taylor	Lauren
Washington	Emily	Hannah	Madison	Emma	Sarah	Samantha	Ashley	Jessica	Taylor	Alexis
West Virginia	Hannah	Emily	Madison	Alexis	Haley	Taylor	Sarah	Megan	Ashley	Abigail
Wisconsin	Emily	Hannah	Samantha	Elizabeth	Alexis	Emma	Grace	Ashley	Megan	Taylor
Wyoming	Madison	Taylor	Emily	Alexis	Hannah	Sarah	Abigail, Grace, Jessica	Ashley, Emma, Megan	Kayla, Lauren, Morgan, Olivia, Samantha, Sierra	Bailey, Hailey

== 2001 ==
Male names
Region	No. 1	No. 2	No. 3	No. 4	No. 5	No. 6	No. 7	No. 8	No. 9	No. 10
Alabama	William	Jacob	Joshua	James	Christopher	John	Michael	Matthew	Austin	Tyler
Alaska	Michael	Jacob	Tyler	Ethan	Joseph	William	Dylan	David	Joshua	Matthew
Arizona	Jacob	Michael	Jose	Anthony	Matthew	Jesus, Joshua	Daniel	Christopher	Andrew	Joseph
Arkansas	Jacob	William	Joshua	Austin	Ethan	Hunter	Matthew	Christopher	Tyler	Michael
California	Daniel	Anthony	Andrew	Jose	Jacob	David	Michael	Joshua	Matthew	Christopher
Colorado	Jacob	Michael	Joshua	Joseph	Tyler	Matthew	Andrew	Daniel	Nicholas	Ryan
Connecticut	Michael	Matthew	Nicholas	Christopher	John	Ryan	Jacob	Joseph	Anthony	Joshua
Delaware	Michael	Jacob	Matthew	Zachary	Ryan	Christopher	James, Joshua, Nicolas	John	Andrew	Joseph
District of Columbia	Michael	John	William	Christopher, Joshua	Anthony, James	Kevin	Daniel	Nicolas	Robert	David
Florida	Michael	Jacob	Christopher	Joshua	Matthew	Nicolas	Anthony	Daniel	David	Tyler
Georgia	William	Jacob	Joshua	Michael	Christopher	Matthew	John	Andrew	James	Brandon
Hawaii	Joshua	Jacob	Matthew, Noah	Dylan, Elijah	Isaiah	Micah, Michael, Ryan	Brandon	Ethan, Tyler	Justin	Joseph
Idaho	Jacob	Ethan	Joshua	Andrew	Michael	Austin	Logan	Matthew	Dylan, Ryan	Tyler
Illinois	Michael	Jacob	Matthew	Daniel	Nicholas	Joshua	Anthony	Joseph	Andrew	Alexander
Indiana	Jacob	Ethan	Andrew	Michael	Joshua	Tyler	Austin	Zachary	Nicholas	Matthew
Iowa	Jacob	Tyler	Logan	Ethan	Nicholas	Zachary	Austin	Andrew	Noah	Dylan
Kansas	Jacob	Michael	Ethan	Andrew	Austin	Joshua	Zachary	Matthew, William	Dylan	Logan
Kentucky	Jacob	William	Austin	James	Ethan	Michael	Zachary	Matthew	Joshua	Christopher
Louisiana	Jacob	Joshua	Michael	Christopher	Matthew	Tyler	William	Nicholas	Cameron	Ethan
Maine	Jacob	Matthew	Nicholas	Ethan	Cameron	Tyler	Zachary	Joshua	Noah	Ryan
Maryland	Michael	Matthew	Joshua	Jacob	Nicholas	Christopher	William	Andrew	Ryan	John
Massachusetts	Matthew	Michael	Nicholas	Ryan	John	Jacob	Joseph	Andrew	Christopher	Benjamin
Michigan	Jacob	Nicholas	Joshua	Michael	Andrew	Matthew	Tyler	Joseph	Zachary	Ryan
Minnesota	Jacob	Samuel	Joseph	Benjamin	Andrew	Nicholas	Tyler	Matthew	Zachary	Joshua
Mississippi	William	James	Jacob	Michael	Christopher	John	Joshua	Tyler	Austin	Brandon
Missouri	Jacob	Andrew	Michael	Austin	Matthew	Tyler	Joshua	Nicholas	Ethan	Zachary
Montana	Jacob	Ethan	Tyler	Dylan, Hunter	Andrew	Brandon	Logan, Matthew, Michael	Austin, Joshua	Ryan	Caleb
Nebraska	Jacob	Zachary	Ethan	Tyler	Matthew	Joshua	Andrew	Dylan	Nicholas	Samuel
Nevada	Anthony	Jacob	Christopher	Michael	Daniel, Matthew	Andrew, Jose	Joseph	Joshua, Tyler	David	Christian
New Hampshire	Jacob	Matthew	Ryan	Tyler	Nicholas	Benjamin	Zachary	Michael	Joshua	Alexander
New Jersey	Michael	Matthew	Nicholas	Joseph	Christopher	Anthony	Ryan	John	Daniel	Andrew
New Mexico	Joshua	Jacob	Michael	Isaiah	Joseph	Christopher	Gabriel	Matthew	Daniel	Anthony
New York	Michael	Matthew	Nicholas	Joseph	Christopher	Justin	Anthony	Daniel	Joshua	Ryan
North Carolina	Jacob	William	Joshua	Christopher	Michael	Matthew	James	John	David	Zachary
North Dakota	Jacob	Ethan	Matthew	Dylan	Hunter	Tyler	Austin, Cole	Andrew	Benjamin, Nicholas, Zachary	Logan, Michael
Ohio	Jacob	Michael	Nicholas	Andrew	Joshua	Matthew	Tyler	Zachary	Austin	Joseph
Oklahoma	Jacob	Joshua	Michael	Ethan	Caleb	William	Tyler	Matthew	Austin	Hunter
Oregon	Jacob	Joshua	Ethan	Michael	Tyler	Daniel	Andrew	Samuel	Austin	Matthew
Pennsylvania	Michael	Jacob	Matthew	Nicholas	Tyler	Joshua	Ryan	John	Joseph	Zachary
Rhode Island	Michael	Matthew	Jacob	Nicholas	Ryan	Joshua	Zachary	John	Alexander	Joseph
South Carolina	William	Jacob	Joshua	Christopher	James	Michael	Matthew	John	Austin	Joseph
South Dakota	Jacob	Dylan	Ethan	Hunter	Austin	Tyler	Michael	Zachary	Logan	Andrew, Mason
Tennessee	Jacob	William	Joshua	James	Austin	Matthew	Michael	Christopher	John	Zachary
Texas	Jose	Jacob	Michael	Joshua	Christopher	David	Matthew	Daniel	Christian	Juan
Utah	Jacob	Ethan	Joshua	Tyler	Michael	Andrew	Samuel	Zachary	Matthew	Dylan
Vermont	Jacob	Nicholas	Dylan	Ethan, Samuel	Benjamin, Zachary	Noah, Tyler	Matthew	Hunter, Ryan	Andrew	Joshua, William
Virginia	Jacob	William	Michael	Joshua	Matthew	Christopher	John	Nicholas	Joseph	James
Washington	Jacob	Joshua	Ethan	Michael	Andrew	Alexander	Tyler	Daniel	Matthew	Joseph
West Virginia	Jacob	Austin	Hunter	Zachary	Tyler	Matthew	Ethan	Joshua, Michael	Christopher, James	Dylan
Wisconsin	Jacob	Samuel	Matthew	Tyler	Nicholas	Ethan	Benjamin	Joshua, Zachary	Austin	Michael
Wyoming	Jacob	Joshua	Michael	Tyler	Hunter	Logan, Ryan	William	Caleb	Christopher, Joseph, Nicholas	Austin, Ethan, Matthew

Female names
Region	No. 1	No. 2	No. 3	No. 4	No. 5	No. 6	No. 7	No. 8	No. 9	No. 10
Alabama	Madison	Hannah	Anna	Emily	Sarah	Alexis	Taylor	Mary	Destiny	Lauren
Alaska	Madison	Emily	Hannah	Ashley	Abigail	Elizabeth	Emma, Grace	Victoria	Haley	Alexis, Alyssa, Megan, Taylor
Arizona	Ashley	Emily	Alexis	Madison	Samantha	Jessica	Hannah	Alyssa	Elizabeth	Brianna, Jennifer
Arkansas	Hannah	Madison	Emily	Alexis	Sarah	Destiny	Abigail	Ashley, Elizabeth	Anna, Olivia	Taylor
California	Emily	Ashley	Samantha	Jessica	Alyssa	Jennifer	Natalie	Elizabeth	Alexis	Jasmine
Colorado	Emily	Hannah	Madison	Ashley	Taylor	Samantha	Abigail	Emma	Olivia, Sarah	Jessica, Lauren
Connecticut	Emily	Julia	Olivia	Hannah	Sarah	Samantha	Abigail	Madison	Emma	Isabella
Delaware	Madison	Emily	Alexis	Hannah	Abigail	Olivia	Sarah	Samantha, Taylor	Kayla	Emma
District of Columbia	Emily	Emma, Kayla	Katherine, Taylor	Sophia	Grace, Sydney	Elizabeth	Anna	Ashley, Sarah	Jessica	Alexandra, Brianna, Julia
Florida	Emily	Madison	Ashley	Hannah	Samantha	Alexis	Sarah	Brianna	Jessica	Taylor
Georgia	Madison	Emily	Hannah	Sarah	Taylor	Alexis	Anna	Elizabeth	Ashley	Abigail, Kayla
Hawaii	Taylor	Kayla	Madison	Alyssa	Sarah	Alexis, Ashley	Emily	Chloe	Elizabeth, Jessica, Malia	Samantha
Idaho	Madison	Emily	Ashley	Hannah	Emma	Taylor	Grace	Hailey	Abigail, Alexis	Elizabeth, Olivia
Illinois	Emily	Hannah	Jessica	Grace	Samantha	Madison	Alexis	Abigail	Elizabeth	Ashley
Indiana	Madison	Hannah	Emily	Alexis	Abigail	Olivia	Taylor	Emma	Grace	Elizabeth
Iowa	Madison	Hannah	Emma	Emily	Alexis	Taylor	Elizabeth	Grace	Abigail	Samantha
Kansas	Madison	Emily	Hannah	Emma	Alexis	Abigail	Lauren	Taylor	Grace	Elizabeth
Kentucky	Madison	Hannah	Emily	Taylor	Alexis	Abigail	Haley	Olivia, Sarah	Ashley, Destiny	Elizabeth
Louisiana	Madison	Hannah	Emily	Alexis	Taylor	Destiny	Sarah	Kayla	Abigail	Victoria
Maine	Emily	Abigail	Hannah	Emma	Madison	Olivia	Alexis	Grace	Sarah	Mackenzie
Maryland	Emily	Kayla	Madison	Hannah	Sarah	Taylor	Alexis	Abigail	Samantha	Emma
Massachusetts	Emily	Olivia	Hannah	Sarah	Julia	Emma	Samantha	Madison	Abigail	Grace
Michigan	Madison	Emily	Hannah	Olivia	Alexis	Lauren	Elizabeth	Abigail	Samantha	Emma, Taylor
Minnesota	Emily	Grace	Emma	Madison	Hannah	Abigail	Olivia	Anna	Elizabeth	Alexis, Samantha
Mississippi	Madison	Hannah	Anna	Alexis	Destiny	Taylor	Kayla	Mary	Emily	Brianna
Missouri	Hannah	Emily	Madison	Abigail	Alexis	Grace	Taylor	Emma	Elizabeth	Olivia
Montana	Madison	Emily	Hannah	Alyssa	Sarah	Elizabeth, Samantha, Taylor	Emma	Jessica	Hailey	Ashley
Nebraska	Madison	Emily	Hannah	Emma	Grace	Abigail	Taylor	Samantha	Ashley	Alexis
Nevada	Emily	Ashley	Madison	Hannah	Alexis	Samantha	Alyssa	Jessica	Sarah	Taylor
New Hampshire	Emily	Madison	Hannah	Emma	Olivia	Abigail	Sarah	Elizabeth	Lauren	Grace
New Jersey	Emily	Samantha	Ashley	Nicole	Sarah	Julia	Jessica	Olivia	Madison	Kayla
New Mexico	Alexis	Alyssa	Destiny	Ashley	Samantha	Hannah	Jasmine	Brianna	Emily	Savannah
New York	Emily	Ashley	Samantha	Sarah	Kayla	Jessica	Nicole	Brianna, Julia	Olivia	Madison
North Carolina	Hannah	Madison	Emily	Sarah	Taylor	Elizabeth	Abigail	Alexis	Anna	Kayla
North Dakota	Madison	Hannah	Emily	Grace	Emma	Abigail	Alexis	Olivia, Sydney, Taylor	Kaitlyn, Megan	Morgan
Ohio	Madison	Hannah	Emily	Alexis	Abigail	Olivia	Taylor	Elizabeth	Grace	Emma
Oklahoma	Madison	Hannah	Emily	Alexis	Ashley	Abigail	Taylor	Elizabeth	Alyssa	Sarah
Oregon	Emily	Madison	Hannah	Emma	Elizabeth	Grace	Olivia	Abigail	Samantha	Alexis, Ashley
Pennsylvania	Emily	Madison	Hannah	Sarah	Abigail	Olivia	Samantha	Alexis	Elizabeth	Emma, Kayla
Rhode Island	Emily	Madison	Samantha	Hannah, Sarah	Isabella	Olivia	Ashley	Victoria	Abigail	Elizabeth
South Carolina	Madison	Hannah	Emily	Taylor	Anna	Sarah	Alexis	Elizabeth	Lauren	Brianna
South Dakota	Madison	Hannah	Grace	Taylor	Emily	Morgan, Sydney	Abigail, Elizabeth	Alexis, Emma	Samantha	Haley
Tennessee	Hannah	Madison	Emily	Sarah	Alexis	Taylor	Abigail	Elizabeth	Anna	Destiny
Texas	Emily	Madison	Ashley	Alexis	Alyssa	Hannah	Samantha	Victoria	Abigail	Jessica
Utah	Emily	Madison	Emma	Hannah	Alexis	Samantha	Ashley	Abigail	Megan	Sarah
Vermont	Emily	Hannah	Olivia	Emma	Madison	Abigail	Taylor	Elizabeth, Grace	Alexis	Brianna
Virginia	Emily	Hannah	Madison	Sarah	Kayla	Abigail	Taylor	Alexis	Lauren	Elizabeth
Washington	Emily	Madison	Hannah	Emma	Grace, Olivia	Elizabeth	Samantha	Sarah	Ashley, Jessica	Alexis
West Virginia	Madison	Hannah	Emily	Alexis	Abigail	Taylor	Kaitlyn, Olivia	Haley	Morgan, Sarah	Ashley
Wisconsin	Emily	Hannah	Emma	Olivia	Elizabeth	Megan	Grace	Abigail	Alexis	Samantha, Taylor
Wyoming	Madison	Taylor	Alexis	Emily, Megan	Mackenzie	Hannah	Jessica, Morgan	Grace, Paige, Samantha, Sarah	Olivia, Sydney	Abigail, Sierra

== 2002 ==
Male names
Region	No. 1	No. 2	No. 3	No. 4	No. 5	No. 6	No. 7	No. 8	No. 9	No. 10
Alabama	William	Jacob	Joshua	James	John	Christopher	Michael	Austin	Andrew	Matthew
Alaska	Jacob	Joshua, Michael	Ethan	Tyler	Joseph	Dylan, James	Matthew	Benjamin	Alexander, Andrew, John, Nicholas	Anthony, Hunter, Logan, Ryan
Arizona	Jacob	Jose	Michael	Daniel	Joshua	Anthony	Jesus	Matthew	David, Joseph	Andrew
Arkansas	Jacob	Ethan	William	Caleb	Joshua	Christopher	Matthew	Hunter	James	Austin
California	Daniel	Anthony	Andrew, Jose	Jacob	Joshua	Michael	David	Matthew	Christopher	Angel
Colorado	Jacob	Joshua	Michael	Ethan	Joseph	Alexander	Daniel	Tyler	Andrew	David
Connecticut	Michael	Matthew	Nicholas	Ryan	Christopher	Joshua	Joseph	Jacob	Anthony	John
Delaware	Matthew	Nicholas	Michael	Jacob, John	Ryan, William	Andrew	Joshua	Joseph	Christopher	James
District of Columbia	Michael	William	James	John	David	Alexander	Kevin	Joshua	Samuel	Christopher
Florida	Michael	Joshua	Jacob	Matthew	Daniel	Christopher	Anthony	Nicholas	David	Jonathan
Georgia	William	Joshua	Jacob	Christopher	Michael	James	Matthew	John	Andrew	Ethan
Hawaii	Joshua	Ethan	Noah	Isaiah	Jacob, Matthew	Michael	Tyler	Elijah	Christian	William
Idaho	Jacob	Ethan	Tyler	Austin	Andrew	Joshua	Gabriel	Michael	Dylan	Logan
Illinois	Michael	Jacob	Matthew	Daniel	Joshua	Nicholas	Anthony	Joseph	Alexander	Andrew
Indiana	Jacob	Ethan	Michael	Joshua	Matthew	Austin	Tyler	Andrew	Zachary	Logan
Iowa	Jacob	Ethan	Tyler	Zachary	Austin	Logan	Andrew	Nicholas	Joseph	Samuel
Kansas	Jacob	Ethan	Andrew	Joshua	Zachary	Michael	Nicholas	Tyler	Austin	William
Kentucky	Jacob	Ethan	William	James	Joshua	Austin	Zachary	Michael	Christopher	Matthew
Louisiana	Joshua	Jacob	Michael	Ethan	Christopher	Cameron	Tyler	Matthew	John	Nicholas
Maine	Jacob	Ethan	Joshua	Nicholas	Samuel	Michael	Tyler	Benjamin	Andrew	William
Maryland	Michael	Jacob	Matthew	Joshua	Christopher	Andrew	Ethan	Nicholas	William	Ryan
Massachusetts	Matthew	Michael	Nicholas	Ryan	John	Jacob	Joseph	Andrew	William	Daniel
Michigan	Jacob	Joshua	Ethan	Michael	Nicholas	Andrew	Joseph	Matthew	Tyler	Zachary
Minnesota	Jacob	Ethan	Benjamin	Samuel	Nicholas	Joseph	Zachary	Andrew	Joshua	Alexander
Mississippi	William	Christopher	James, Joshua	Jacob	John	Michael	Matthew	Ethan, Tyler	Austin	Joseph
Missouri	Jacob	Ethan	Andrew	Austin	Michael	Joshua	Joseph	Matthew	Tyler	William
Montana	Ethan	Jacob	Dylan	Logan	Tyler	Michael	Austin	Caleb	Hunter	Zachary
Nebraska	Jacob	Ethan	Joshua	Zachary	Alexander	Tyler	Samuel	Austin	William	Logan, Matthew
Nevada	Anthony	Daniel	Michael	Jacob	Christopher	Joshua	Matthew	David	Tyler	Joseph
New Hampshire	Jacob	Matthew	Nicholas	Ethan	Joshua	Ryan	Michael	Joseph	Dylan	Alexander
New Jersey	Michael	Matthew	Nicholas	Joseph	Christopher	Anthony	Daniel	Ryan	John	Joshua
New Mexico	Joshua	Jacob	Isaiah	Matthew	Michael	Joseph	Christopher, Gabriel	Jose	David	Elijah
New York	Michael	Matthew	Nicholas	Joseph	Christopher	Anthony	Daniel	Justin	Joshua	Ryan
North Carolina	William	Jacob	Joshua	Christopher	Michael	Matthew	Ethan	James	Andrew	David
North Dakota	Jacob	Ethan	Logan	Joshua	Tyler	Hunter, Zachary	Austin	Noah	Matthew	Michael
Ohio	Jacob	Michael	Andrew	Joshua	Ethan, Nicholas	Tyler	Matthew	Joseph	Zachary	Austin
Oklahoma	Jacob	Ethan	Joshua	Caleb	Tyler	Matthew	Michael	William	Christopher	Hunter
Oregon	Jacob	Ethan	Joshua	Michael	Andrew	Austin	Joseph	Alexander	Daniel, David, Samuel	Gabriel, Logan
Pennsylvania	Michael	Jacob	Matthew	Nicholas	Ryan	Joshua	Joseph	Tyler	John	Andrew
Rhode Island	Nicholas	Michael	Matthew	Jacob	Ethan	Joshua	Joseph	Ryan	Anthony	Andrew
South Carolina	William	Jacob	Joshua	James	Christopher	Michael	Matthew	John	Ethan	Andrew
South Dakota	Jacob	Ethan	Mason	Logan	Samuel	Tyler	Dylan	Austin	Caleb, Hunter, Matthew	Andrew
Tennessee	Jacob	William	Joshua	James	Michael	Ethan	Matthew	Austin	Christopher	John
Texas	Jose	Jacob	Joshua	Michael	Christopher	Daniel	Juan	David	Matthew	Jonathan
Utah	Jacob	Ethan	Joshua	Samuel	Tyler	Benjamin	Andrew	Zachary	Isaac, Nathan	Matthew
Vermont	Ethan	Jacob	Matthew	Hunter	William	Nicholas	Dylan, Ryan	Samuel	Tyler	Owen
Virginia	Jacob	Michael	William	Joshua	Ethan	Matthew	Christopher	James	John	Andrew
Washington	Ethan	Jacob	Michael	Joshua	Alexander	Daniel	Tyler	Andrew	Joseph, Matthew	Benjamin
West Virginia	Jacob	Austin	Hunter	Ethan	James	Christopher	Logan	Tyler	Joshua, Matthew, Zachary	Andrew
Wisconsin	Jacob	Ethan	Tyler	Nicholas	Joshua	Alexander, Michael	Austin	Joseph	Samuel	Matthew
Wyoming	Ethan	Jacob	Hunter	Joshua	Austin	Michael	Tyler	Logan, William	Christopher, Joseph, Justin, Matthew	Caleb

Female names
Region	No. 1	No. 2	No. 3	No. 4	No. 5	No. 6	No. 7	No. 8	No. 9	No. 10
Alabama	Madison	Hannah	Anna	Emily	Alexis	Mary	Sarah	Elizabeth	Emma	Lauren
Alaska	Madison	Elizabeth, Emily	Emma	Ashley, Hannah	Alexis	Olivia	Jasmine, Samantha	Sarah	Abigail	Grace, Trinity
Arizona	Emily	Ashley	Alexis	Samantha	Madison	Alyssa	Hannah	Jennifer	Emma	Isabella
Arkansas	Madison	Hannah	Emily	Sarah	Abigail	Alexis	Anna	Taylor	Elizabeth	Lauren
California	Emily	Ashley	Samantha	Jessica	Jennifer	Isabella	Alyssa	Elizabeth	Jasmine	Natalie
Colorado	Madison	Emily	Emma	Ashley	Isabella	Hannah	Abigail	Elizabeth	Samantha	Olivia
Connecticut	Emily	Olivia	Emma	Samantha	Julia	Madison	Sarah	Abigail	Isabella	Elizabeth
Delaware	Emily	Madison	Hannah	Olivia	Alexis, Sarah	Kayla	Ashley, Elizabeth, Rachel	Samantha	Abigail, Emma	Isabella
District of Columbia	Kayla	Sarah, Taylor	Elizabeth	Olivia	Emily, Katherine	Lauren	Samantha	Anna, Julia	Caroline	Alexandra, Grace, Jessica, Jordan, Sophia, Sydney
Florida	Emily	Madison	Ashley	Hannah, Isabella	Brianna	Sarah	Samantha	Alexis	Alyssa	Kayla
Georgia	Madison	Emily	Hannah	Alexis	Sarah	Abigail	Elizabeth	Anna, Emma	Taylor	Ashley
Hawaii	Kayla	Taylor	Emma, Jasmine, Madison	Emily, Malia	Ashley, Kiana, Samantha	Alyssa	Mia	Hannah, Kylie	Chloe	Alexis, Lauren
Idaho	Madison	Emily	Emma	Hannah	Abigail	Alexis	Hailey	Taylor	Olivia	Elizabeth
Illinois	Emily	Emma	Olivia	Madison	Hannah	Grace	Abigail	Ashley	Samantha	Alexis
Indiana	Madison	Emily	Emma	Hannah	Abigail	Olivia	Alexis	Grace	Elizabeth	Taylor
Iowa	Emma	Madison	Emily	Hannah	Abigail, Olivia	Alexis	Grace	Elizabeth	Taylor	Chloe, Lauren, Samantha
Kansas	Emily	Madison	Emma	Abigail, Hannah	Alexis	Grace	Elizabeth	Lauren	Taylor	Alyssa
Kentucky	Madison	Hannah	Emily	Alexis	Emma	Abigail, Haley	Olivia	Sarah	Elizabeth	Taylor
Louisiana	Madison	Emily	Hannah	Alexis	Taylor	Emma	Alyssa	Sarah	Destiny	Abigail
Maine	Emily	Hannah	Madison	Abigail	Emma	Olivia	Alexis	Sarah	Elizabeth	Grace
Maryland	Madison	Emily	Kayla	Sarah	Hannah	Abigail	Emma	Olivia	Taylor	Alexis
Massachusetts	Emily	Olivia	Emma	Sarah	Abigail	Madison	Julia	Hannah	Grace	Isabella
Michigan	Madison	Emily	Emma	Hannah	Olivia	Alexis	Abigail, Grace	Elizabeth	Samantha	Lauren
Minnesota	Emma	Grace	Emily	Olivia	Abigail	Hannah	Madison	Anna	Elizabeth	Alexis, Megan
Mississippi	Madison	Hannah	Anna	Alexis	Emily	Sarah	Ashanti	Destiny	Mary	Elizabeth
Missouri	Madison	Hannah	Emily	Emma	Abigail	Alexis	Grace	Olivia	Elizabeth	Taylor
Montana	Madison	Emily	Hannah	Emma	Abigail, Elizabeth	Taylor	Alexis, Olivia	Grace	Samantha	Hailey
Nebraska	Emma	Madison	Emily	Hannah	Grace	Alexis	Elizabeth	Olivia	Abigail	Anna
Nevada	Emily	Madison	Ashley	Alexis	Samantha	Hannah	Isabella	Jessica	Alyssa	Emma
New Hampshire	Emily	Madison	Emma	Olivia	Abigail	Hannah, Sarah	Elizabeth	Samantha	Anna	Alexis
New Jersey	Emily	Samantha	Ashley	Sarah	Kayla	Julia	Jessica	Olivia	Nicole	Isabella
New Mexico	Alexis	Alyssa	Ashley	Brianna	Emily	Samantha	Jasmine	Madison	Mariah	Savannah
New York	Emily	Samantha	Ashley	Sarah	Brianna	Olivia	Kayla	Isabella	Madison	Emma
North Carolina	Madison	Hannah	Emily	Sarah	Emma	Elizabeth	Abigail	Alexis, Taylor	Anna	Lauren
North Dakota	Madison	Hannah	Emily	Grace	Emma	Abigail	Morgan	Elizabeth	Sydney, Taylor	Alexis, Alyssa, Ashley, Kaitlyn
Ohio	Madison	Hannah	Emily	Alexis	Emma	Olivia	Abigail	Elizabeth	Taylor	Grace
Oklahoma	Madison	Emily	Hannah	Alexis	Abigail	Emma	Elizabeth, Taylor	Jessica	Chloe	Morgan
Oregon	Emily	Madison	Emma	Hannah	Elizabeth	Olivia	Grace	Abigail	Sarah	Samantha
Pennsylvania	Emily	Madison	Hannah	Sarah	Abigail	Olivia	Emma	Alexis	Elizabeth	Samantha
Rhode Island	Madison	Emily	Emma	Isabella	Ashley, Hannah	Sarah	Olivia	Samantha	Abigail	Victoria
South Carolina	Madison	Hannah	Emily	Elizabeth	Abigail	Sarah	Alexis	Anna	Taylor	Emma
South Dakota	Hannah	Emily	Grace	Abigail	Emma	Morgan	Madison	Alexis	Taylor	Elizabeth, Megan
Tennessee	Madison	Hannah	Emily	Emma	Sarah	Alexis	Abigail	Anna	Elizabeth	Lauren, Taylor
Texas	Emily	Madison	Ashley	Alyssa	Alexis	Hannah	Samantha	Abigail	Brianna	Victoria
Utah	Emily	Emma	Abigail	Madison	Hannah	Olivia	Samantha	Elizabeth	Alexis	Ashley, Jessica
Vermont	Emma	Hannah	Madison	Emily	Abigail	Grace	Olivia	Morgan	Samantha, Sarah	Anna
Virginia	Madison	Emily	Hannah	Sarah	Abigail	Elizabeth	Emma	Alexis	Olivia	Kayla
Washington	Emily	Emma	Hannah	Madison	Olivia	Grace	Elizabeth	Abigail	Samantha	Alexis
West Virginia	Madison	Hannah	Emily	Alexis	Abigail	Haley	Taylor	Emma	Olivia	Sarah
Wisconsin	Emily	Emma	Olivia	Hannah	Abigail	Grace	Elizabeth	Alexis	Lauren	Megan
Wyoming	Madison	Hannah	Elizabeth, Taylor	Emily	Alexis	Alyssa, Samantha	Emma	Abigail, Kylie	Grace	Destiny, Jessica, Sarah, Sydney

== 2003 ==
Male names
Region	No. 1	No. 2	No. 3	No. 4	No. 5	No. 6	No. 7	No. 8	No. 9	No. 10
Alabama	William	Jacob	Joshua	James	John	Christopher	Michael	Matthew	Caleb	Austin
Alaska	Jacob	Joseph	Joshua	James	Ethan, Michael	Daniel, Dylan	Logan	Alexander, Tyler, William	Nicholas	Caleb, John
Arizona	Jacob	Jose	Daniel	Anthony	Michael	Angel	Jesus	Joshua	Andrew	David
Arkansas	Jacob	Joshua	Ethan	William	Michael	Caleb	John	Christopher	Matthew	James
California	Daniel	Anthony	Andrew	Jose	Jacob	David	Joshua	Angel	Michael	Matthew
Colorado	Jacob	Joshua	Andrew	Alexander	Daniel	Ethan, Michael	Joseph	Ryan	Tyler	Matthew
Connecticut	Matthew	Michael	Ryan	Nicholas	Joseph, Joshua	John	Andrew	Christopher	Jacob	Anthony
Delaware	Michael	Andrew, Michael	Ryan	John	Joshua	Jacob	Christopher	Joseph	James	William
District of Columbia	Michael	William	Alexander, John	David	Daniel, James, Joshua	Christopher	Matthew	Samuel	Andrew	Ryan
Florida	Michael	Joshua	Matthew	Anthony	Christopher	Jacob	Daniel	Nicholas	Joseph	Alexander
Georgia	William	Joshua	Jacob	Michael	Christopher	James	Matthew	John	Andrew	Ethan
Hawaii	Joshua	Jacob, Noah	Ethan	Dylan	Isaiah	Michael	Elijah	Matthew	Christian, Micah	David
Idaho	Ethan	Jacob	Tyler	Andrew	Logan, Michael	Gabriel, Joshua	Caleb, Dylan, Nathan	Matthew	Nicholas, Zachary	Hunter
Illinois	Michael	Jacob	Daniel	Joseph	Anthony	Matthew	Alexander	Joshua	Andrew	Nicholas
Indiana	Jacob	Ethan	Michael	Andrew	Joshua	Tyler	Logan	Matthew, Nicholas	Joseph, Samuel	Zachary
Iowa	Jacob	Ethan	Tyler	Andrew	Logan	Samuel	Hunter	Alexander	Austin, Nicholas, Zachary	Carter
Kansas	Jacob	Ethan	Andrew	Joshua	Tyler	Joseph	Logan	Michael	Matthew	William
Kentucky	Jacob	James	Ethan	William	Joshua	Matthew	Andrew, Zachary	Michael	Austin	Dylan, John
Louisiana	Jacob	Ethan	Joshua	Michael	Christopher	Tyler	Cameron	William	Nicholas	John
Maine	Jacob	Nicholas	Joshua	Matthew	Ethan	Tyler	Ryan	Logan, Zachary	Dylan	Michael, Samuel
Maryland	Joshua	Michael	Jacob	Ryan	Andrew	Nicholas	Matthew	Christopher, William	Joseph	Daniel
Massachusetts	Matthew	Michael	Ryan	Nicholas	John	Jacob	Joseph	William	Andrew	Joshua
Michigan	Jacob	Ethan	Joshua	Michael	Andrew	Joseph	Matthew	Tyler	Nicholas	Ryan
Minnesota	Jacob	Ethan	Joseph	Andrew	Samuel	Tyler	Nicholas	Benjamin	Zachary	Joshua
Mississippi	William	Christopher	James	Jacob	Joshua	John	Michael	Ethan	Tyler	Matthew
Missouri	Jacob	Ethan, Tyler	Andrew	William	Michael	Joshua	Joseph	Logan	Alexander, Matthew	Zachary
Montana	Jacob	Joshua	Ethan	Hunter	Logan, Tyler	Michael	Dylan	Zachary	Andrew, Joseph	Samuel
Nebraska	Jacob	Ethan	Tyler	Alexander	Joshua	Michael	Dylan	Andrew, Samuel	Joseph, Logan, Zachary	William
Nevada	Anthony	Michael	Jacob	Joshua	Joseph	Jose	Christopher	Tyler	Alexander	Ryan
New Hampshire	Jacob	Ryan	Nicholas	Matthew	Joshua	Andrew	Michael	Zachary	Ethan, Tyler	Alexander
New Jersey	Michael	Matthew	Nicholas	Joseph	Anthony	Ryan	Christopher	Daniel	Andrew	John
New Mexico (2003	Joshua	Jacob	Gabriel	Michael	Jose	Joseph	Isaiah	Daniel	Matthew	Anthony
New York	Michael	Matthew	Joseph	Nicholas	Christopher	Anthony	Daniel	Ryan	Justin	Joshua
North Carolina	Jacob	William	Joshua	Michael	Christopher	James	Matthew	Ethan	Andrew	John
North Dakota	Ethan	Jacob	Logan	Hunter	Samuel	Andrew	Zachary	Dylan	Isaac, Matthew	Austin, Benjamin
Ohio	Jacob	Andrew	Michael	Ethan	Joshua	Nicholas	Joseph	Tyler	Matthew	Zachary
Oklahoma	Jacob	Ethan	Joshua	Michael	Caleb	Tyler	William	Matthew	Dylan	Hunter
Oregon	Jacob	Ethan	Andrew	Daniel, Joshua	Ryan	Tyler	Michael	Samuel	Zachary	Alexander
Pennsylvania	Michael	Ryan	Jacob	Matthew	Nicholas	Joseph	Joshua	Tyler	Andrew	Zachary
Rhode Island	Michael	Matthew	Jacob	Nicholas	Ryan	Aidan	Joshua	Andrew	Joseph	John
South Carolina	William	Jacob	James	Joshua	Christopher	Michael	John	Matthew	Ethan	Joseph
South Dakota	Jacob	Ethan	Logan	Mason	Carter, Michael	Jackson, Joseph	Alexander, Dylan, Noah	Zachary	Gavin	Austin, Caleb
Tennessee	William	Jacob	Joshua	James	Ethan	Michael	Christopher	Matthew	Andrew	John
Texas	Jose	Jacob	Joshua	Michael	Daniel	Christopher	David	Juan	Matthew	Jonathan
Utah	Ethan	Jacob	Joshua	Samuel	Tyler	Isaac	Benjamin	Andrew	Zachary	Nathan
Vermont	Ethan	Jacob	Benjamin	Tyler, William	Ryan, Samuel	Alexander	Owen	Dylan, Matthew	Logan	Hunter
Virginia	Jacob	William	Michael	Joshua	Christopher	Matthew	Andrew	James	Ethan	Ryan
Washington	Jacob	Ethan	Joshua	Ryan	Alexander	Andrew	Daniel	Michael	Tyler	Samuel
West Virginia	Jacob	Ethan	Matthew	Hunter	Tyler	Austin	Logan	Joshua	Michael	Caleb
Wisconsin	Jacob	Ethan	Logan	Tyler	Samuel	Alexander	Matthew	Joseph	Benjamin	Andrew
Wyoming	Jacob	Ethan	Joshua, Matthew	Hunter	James	Michael	Alexander, Zachary	Joseph	Caleb	Anthony, Tyler

Female names
Region	No. 1	No. 2	No. 3	No. 4	No. 5	No. 6	No. 7	No. 8	No. 9	No. 10
Alabama	Madison	Emma	Emily	Hannah	Anna	Sarah	Alexis	Olivia	Abigail	Elizabeth
Alaska	Hannah	Emma	Emily	Madison	Hailey	Alexis, Isabella	Abigail, Olivia	Alyssa, Elizabeth	Trinity	Sarah
Arizona	Emily	Emma	Ashley	Alexis	Alyssa	Samantha	Isabella	Madison	Abigail	Hannah
Arkansas	Madison	Emily	Hannah	Emma	Alexis	Abigail	Elizabeth	Chloe	Olivia	Anna
California	Emily	Ashley	Samantha	Isabella	Alyssa	Emma	Natalie	Jessica	Jennifer	Elizabeth
Colorado	Emily	Emma	Madison	Hannah	Isabella	Ashley	Abigail	Samantha	Grace	Elizabeth
Connecticut	Emma	Emily	Olivia	Madison	Julia	Grace	Samantha	Abigail	Sarah	Isabella
Delaware	Emily	Madison	Emma, Hannah	Abigail	Olivia	Sarah	Kayla	Alexis, Grace	Isabella, Samantha	Elizabeth, Sophia
District of Columbia	Kayla	Emily, Katherine	Elizabeth, Sophia	Abigail, Caroline	Sarah	Anna	Emma, Grace	Ashley, Olivia, Sydney, Taylor	Maya	Isabella
Florida	Emily	Isabella	Madison	Emma	Hannah	Ashley	Alexis	Sarah	Brianna	Alyssa
Georgia	Emily	Madison	Emma	Hannah	Sarah	Abigail	Alexis	Elizabeth	Ashley	Olivia
Hawaii	Emma	Alyssa	Kayla	Taylor	Mia	Emily	Madison	Sarah	Isabella	Alexis, Hannah
Idaho	Emma	Hannah	Emily	Madison	Abigail	Olivia	Alexis	Hailey	Elizabeth	Grace
Illinois	Emily	Emma	Olivia	Abigail	Grace	Madison	Elizabeth	Alexis	Hannah	Ashley
Indiana	Emma	Madison	Emily	Hannah	Olivia	Abigail	Alexis	Grace	Elizabeth	Chloe
Iowa	Emma	Emily	Madison	Olivia	Grace	Hannah	Abigail	Alexis	Elizabeth	Lauren
Kansas	Emma	Madison	Emily	Hannah	Abigail	Olivia	Grace	Alexis	Elizabeth	Alyssa
Kentucky	Emily	Madison	Hannah	Emma	Abigail	Alexis	Haley	Sarah	Olivia	Elizabeth
Louisiana	Madison	Emily	Emma	Hannah	Alexis	Taylor	Abigail	Olivia	Alyssa	Chloe
Maine	Emma	Emily	Abigail, Hannah	Madison	Olivia	Grace	Alexis	Elizabeth	Sarah	Isabella
Maryland	Emily	Madison	Emma	Kayla	Hannah	Olivia	Sarah	Abigail, Grace	Alexis	Ashley
Massachusetts	Emily	Emma	Olivia	Abigail	Isabella	Sarah	Grace	Hannah	Samantha	Julia
Michigan	Emma	Madison	Emily	Olivia	Hannah	Alexis	Grace	Abigail	Elizabeth	Lauren
Minnesota	Emma	Grace	Emily	Olivia	Abigail	Hannah	Elizabeth	Madison	Ella	Anna
Mississippi	Madison	Hannah	Anna	Emma	Alexis, Emily	Taylor	Sarah	Destiny	Olivia	Makayla
Missouri	Emma	Emily	Madison	Hannah	Abigail	Olivia	Alexis	Grace	Elizabeth	Taylor
Montana	Emma	Hannah	Madison	Hailey	Emily	Elizabeth	Alexis	Samantha	Alyssa	Abigail
Nebraska	Emma	Emily	Olivia	Grace	Madison	Abigail	Hannah	Elizabeth	Alexis	Taylor
Nevada	Emily	Emma	Ashley	Madison	Alexis	Alyssa	Isabella	Samantha	Elizabeth	Jennifer
New Hampshire	Emma	Emily	Olivia	Abigail	Madison	Hannah	Elizabeth	Grace	Alexis	Isabella, Sarah
New Jersey	Emily	Isabella	Olivia	Emma	Samantha	Sarah	Ashley	Julia	Kayla	Madison
New Mexico	Alexis, Alyssa	Emily	Ashley	Madison	Destiny, Jasmine	Isabella	Samantha	Brianna	Hannah	Elizabeth, Mariah
New York	Emily	Emma	Olivia	Isabella	Samantha	Sarah	Kayla	Ashley	Madison	Brianna
North Carolina	Madison	Emma	Emily	Hannah	Abigail	Sarah	Olivia	Elizabeth	Anna	Ashley
North Dakota	Emma	Madison	Hannah	Emily	Alexis, Olivia	Grace	Abigail	Morgan	Taylor	Sydney
Ohio	Emma	Madison	Emily	Olivia	Hannah	Abigail	Grace	Alexis	Elizabeth	Sarah
Oklahoma	Emily	Madison	Emma	Hannah	Abigail	Alexis	Chloe	Alyssa	Elizabeth	Olivia
Oregon	Emma	Emily	Hannah	Madison	Olivia	Grace	Abigail	Elizabeth	Isabella	Samantha
Pennsylvania	Emily	Emma	Madison	Olivia	Hannah	Abigail	Sarah	Grace	Alexis	Isabella
Rhode Island	Emily	Madison	Emma	Olivia	Isabella, Sophia	Sarah	Abigail	Ashley	Hannah	Samantha
South Carolina	Madison	Emily	Hannah	Olivia	Emma	Abigail, Taylor	Sarah	Alexis, Anna, Elizabeth	Caroline, Haley	Kayla
South Dakota	Emma	Hannah	Emily	Olivia	Madison	Abigail	Taylor	Alexis	Grace	Elizabeth
Tennessee	Madison	Emma	Hannah	Emily	Abigail	Alexis	Sarah	Olivia	Elizabeth	Chloe
Texas	Emily	Ashley	Madison	Emma	Alyssa	Abigail	Alexis	Hannah	Samantha	Brianna
Utah	Emma	Madison	Emily, Hannah	Abigail	Elizabeth	Olivia	Brooklyn	Hailey	Sarah	Alexis
Vermont	Emma	Emily	Abigail, Madison	Hannah, Olivia	Grace	Alexis, Anna	Elizabeth	Ella	Samantha	Chloe, Hailey, Sydney
Virginia	Emily	Emma	Madison	Hannah	Abigail	Olivia	Sarah	Grace	Elizabeth	Alexis
Washington	Emma	Emily	Olivia	Madison	Hannah	Grace	Abigail	Elizabeth	Isabella	Samantha
West Virginia	Madison	Emily	Hannah	Emma	Alexis	Abigail	Haley	Olivia	Chloe	Taylor
Wisconsin	Emma	Emily	Olivia	Grace	Hannah	Abigail	Elizabeth	Alexis	Madison, Samantha	Hailey
Wyoming	Emma, Madison	Hannah	Alexis, Emily	Taylor	Abigail	Elizabeth, Hailey	Grace, Morgan	Samantha	Aspen, Kaitlyn, Sarah	Ashley

== 2004 ==
Male names
Region	No. 1	No. 2	No. 3	No. 4	No. 5	No. 6	No. 7	No. 8	No. 9	No. 10
Alabama	William	Jacob	John	Joshua	James	Christopher, Michael	Matthew	Ethan	Joseph	Tyler
Alaska	Ethan	Joseph	James	Jacob, Samuel, Tyler	Alexander, Joshua, Michael	Benjamin, David, Dylan	Gabriel	Connor, Daniel, Matthew, William	Anthony, John, Logan	Ryan
Arizona	Jose	Jacob	Anthony	Daniel	Angel	Michael	Jesus	Joshua	David	Joseph
Arkansas	Jacob	William	Ethan	Joshua	Michael	James	Hunter	Matthew	Tyler	Andrew
California	Daniel	Anthony	Andrew	Jose	Jacob	Joshua	David	Angel	Michael	Matthew
Colorado	Jacob	Joshua	Ethan	Daniel	Alexander, Andrew	Michael	Joseph	Tyler	Samuel	Ryan
Connecticut	Michael	Ryan	Matthew	Nicholas	Joseph	Jacob	John	Alexander	Christopher	Anthony
Delaware	Ryan	Michael	Joshua	Matthew	Nicholas	Anthony	William	Jacob, Tyler	Joseph	Andrew
District of Columbia	William	John	Alexander	Joshua	Anthony, Michael	Daniel	Andrew	Kevin	David	Benjamin
Florida	Michael	Joshua	Jacob	Anthony	Daniel	Christopher	Matthew	David	Nicholas	Alexander
Georgia	William	Joshua	Jacob	Christopher	Michael	James	Andrew	Ethan	Matthew	John
Hawaii	Joshua	Noah	Ethan	Jacob	Elijah	Matthew	Michael	Tyler	Dylan	Micah
Idaho	Ethan	Tyler	Jacob	Logan	Michael, Samuel	Andrew	Joshua	Ryan	Gabriel	Isaac, Nathan
Illinois	Michael	Jacob	Daniel	Anthony	Joshua	Alexander	Matthew	Joseph	Andrew	Ryan
Indiana	Jacob	Ethan	Andrew	Joshua	Michael	Matthew	William	Logan	Tyler	Alexander, Samuel
Iowa	Jacob	Ethan	Logan	Andrew	Samuel	William	Tyler	Dylan, Michael	Alexander, Carter	Benjamin
Kansas	Jacob	Ethan	Michael	Alexander	Andrew	William	Joshua	Matthew	Tyler	Logan
Kentucky	Jacob	Ethan	William	James	Logan	Joshua	Matthew	Andrew	Michael	Austin
Louisiana	Ethan	Joshua	Jacob	Michael	Christopher	William	Joseph	Matthew	Tyler	John
Maine	Jacob	Ethan	Samuel	Benjamin	Caleb, Logan	Noah	Matthew, Ryan	Nicholas	Andrew, Joseph	Connor, Dylan, Zachary
Maryland	Michael	Jacob	Joshua	Ryan	Matthew	William	Andrew	Christopher	Nicholas	Daniel
Massachusetts	Michael	Matthew	Ryan	Nicholas	Andrew	William	John	Joseph	Daniel	Jacob
Michigan	Jacob	Ethan	Michael	Andrew	Joshua	Joseph, Matthew	Ryan	Nicholas	Tyler	Zachary
Minnesota	Jacob	Ethan	Samuel	Andrew	Benjamin, Tyler	Joseph	Alexander	Jack	William	Matthew
Mississippi	William	James	John	Joshua	Michael	Christopher	Jacob	Tyler	Ethan, Matthew	Elijah
Missouri	Jacob	Ethan	Andrew	Tyler	Michael	Joseph, William	Joshua	Logan	Matthew	Ryan
Montana	Jacob	Ethan	William	Joseph, Michael	Hunter, Wyatt	Dylan	Kaden, Tyler	Benjamin, Ryan	Andrew, Austin, James, Thomas	Zachary
Nebraska	Jacob	Ethan	Samuel	Alexander	Joshua	Tyler	Andrew	Benjamin	Logan	Dylan
Nevada	Anthony	Jacob	Daniel, Joshua	Michael	Angel	Alexander	Ethan	Joseph	Brandon, Jose	Jonathan
New Hampshire	Jacob	Ryan	Matthew	Ethan	Andrew	Nicholas	Tyler	Samuel	Owen	Connor
New Jersey	Michael	Matthew	Nicholas	Ryan	Joseph	Anthony	Daniel	Christopher	Joshua	Andrew
New Mexico	Jacob	Joshua	Matthew	Daniel	Isaiah	Gabriel	Michael	Elijah	Joseph	Anthony
New York	Michael	Matthew	Joseph	Daniel	Ryan	Nicholas	Anthony	Christopher	Joshua	Justin
North Carolina	William	Jacob	Joshua	Michael	Ethan	Christopher	Matthew	Andrew	James	John
North Dakota	Ethan	Jacob	Andrew	Logan	Mason, Zachary	Tyler	Hunter	Dylan	Cole	Alexander
Ohio	Jacob	Ethan	Andrew	Michael	Matthew	Tyler	Joseph	Nicholas	Ryan	Joshua
Oklahoma	Jacob	Ethan	Joshua	Michael	Tyler	William	Nathan	Caleb	Matthew	James
Oregon	Jacob	Ethan	Daniel	Alexander	Andrew	Joshua	Logan	Michael, William	David, Joseph	Tyler
Pennsylvania	Michael	Jacob	Ryan	Matthew	Nicholas	Joshua	Tyler	Joseph	Ethan	Andrew
Rhode Island	Michael	Matthew	Jacob	Alexander	Nicholas	Joseph	Ethan	Christopher	Andrew, Nathan	Joshua
South Carolina	William	Jacob	James	Joshua	Christopher	Michael	John	Ethan	Matthew	David
South Dakota	Ethan	Jacob	Logan	Mason	Dylan	Matthew, Tyler	Andrew, Samuel	Nathan	Carter, Zachary	Joseph
Tennessee	William	Jacob	Ethan	Joshua	James	Michael	Matthew	Christopher	Andrew	John
Texas	Jose	Jacob	Joshua	Daniel	David	Juan	Christopher	Michael	Matthew	Ethan
Utah	Ethan	Jacob	Joshua	Samuel	William	Andrew	Isaac	Tyler	Benjamin	Nathan
Vermont	Jacob	Ryan	William	Ethan	Matthew, Samuel	Dylan	Benjamin, Owen	Logan	Alexander, Noah, Tyler	Caleb, Hunter
Virginia	Jacob	William	Joshua	Michael	Ethan	Christopher	John	Matthew, Ryan	James	Andrew
Washington	Jacob	Ethan	Andrew	Alexander	Daniel, Joshua	Ryan	Michael	Samuel	Tyler	Benjamin
West Virginia	Jacob	Ethan	Logan	Tyler	Hunter, Matthew	Andrew	Joshua, William	Austin	Michael	Caleb, James
Wisconsin	Ethan	Jacob	Alexander	Tyler	Samuel	Logan	Matthew	Joseph	Michael	Benjamin
Wyoming	Michael	Hunter, Jacob	Ethan	Joshua, Ryan	Alexander, Logan, Wyatt	Tyler	Austin, Jonathan	James, Joseph	Christopher	Dylan, Elijah, William

Female names
Region	No. 1	No. 2	No. 3	No. 4	No. 5	No. 6	No. 7	No. 8	No. 9	No. 10
Alabama	Emma	Madison	Emily	Hannah	Anna	Alexis	Sarah	Olivia	Abigail	Elizabeth, Mary
Alaska	Emma	Madison	Hannah	Grace	Emily	Abigail	Olivia	Isabella	Alyssa	Sophia
Arizona	Emily	Isabella	Emma	Ashley, Madison	Alexis	Samantha	Abigail	Alyssa	Elizabeth	Jessica
Arkansas	Madison	Emily	Emma	Hannah	Olivia	Abigail	Alexis	Anna	Elizabeth	Lauren
California	Emily	Ashley	Samantha	Isabella	Natalie	Alyssa	Emma	Sophia	Jessica	Jasmine
Colorado	Emma	Emily	Isabella	Madison	Abigail	Ashley	Hannah	Grace	Sophia	Olivia
Connecticut	Emily	Olivia	Emma	Isabella	Samantha	Madison	Julia	Grace	Sophia	Sarah
Delaware	Madison, Olivia	Emily	Alexis	Elizabeth, Emma, Samantha	Hannah	Grace, Sarah	Ashley, Isabella	Abigail	Alyssa, Kayla	Brianna
District of Columbia	Sophia	Katherine, Kayla	Elizabeth, Emma	Caroline	Abigail, Olivia	Sarah	Sydney	Ashley, Ella	Alexandra, Anna, Madison	Ava, Jasmine
Florida	Emily	Isabella	Madison	Emma	Ashley	Hannah	Brianna	Alyssa, Sarah	Samantha	Sophia
Georgia	Emily	Madison	Emma	Hannah	Sarah	Elizabeth	Abigail	Ashley	Anna, Olivia	Alexis
Hawaii	Emma	Isabella	Emily	Kayla	Chloe	Madison	Taylor	Mia, Sarah	Alyssa, Hannah	Alexis, Zoe
Idaho	Emma	Emily	Alexis	Abigail	Hannah	Olivia	Madison	Hailey	Elizabeth	Samantha
Illinois	Emily	Emma	Olivia	Abigail	Madison	Grace	Isabella	Ashley	Elizabeth	Samantha
Indiana	Emma	Madison	Abigail	Olivia	Emily	Hannah	Grace	Alexis	Elizabeth	Chloe
Iowa	Emma	Madison	Grace	Olivia	Abigail, Emily, Hannah	Elizabeth	Alexis	Samantha	Ella	Anna
Kansas	Emma	Emily, Madison	Abigail	Grace	Hannah	Olivia	Elizabeth	Alexis	Alyssa	Lauren
Kentucky	Madison	Emily	Hannah	Emma	Abigail	Alexis	Olivia	Haley	Elizabeth	Sarah
Louisiana	Madison	Emma	Emily	Hannah	Alexis	Olivia	Alyssa	Abigail	Isabella	Sarah
Maine	Emma	Emily	Madison	Hannah	Olivia	Abigail	Alexis	Elizabeth	Grace	Isabella
Maryland	Madison	Emily	Emma	Kayla	Hannah	Abigail	Olivia	Sarah	Elizabeth	Grace
Massachusetts	Emily	Emma	Olivia	Isabella	Abigail	Ava, Julia	Grace	Madison	Sarah	Sophia
Michigan	Emma	Madison	Emily	Olivia	Hannah	Alexis	Abigail	Grace	Elizabeth	Samantha
Minnesota	Emma	Grace	Olivia	Emily	Abigail	Ella	Madison	Ava	Hannah	Elizabeth, Sophia
Mississippi	Madison	Emily	Hannah	Anna	Emma	Alexis	Taylor	Sarah	Olivia	Elizabeth
Missouri	Emma	Madison	Emily	Abigail	Olivia	Hannah	Grace	Elizabeth	Alexis	Alyssa
Montana	Madison	Emma	Grace	Hannah	Emily	Olivia	Alexis	Elizabeth	Abigail	Hailey
Nebraska	Emma	Emily	Madison	Grace	Hannah	Olivia	Abigail	Elizabeth	Alexis	Samantha
Nevada	Ashley	Emily, Madison	Isabella	Emma	Samantha	Elizabeth	Hannah	Alyssa	Abigail	Jessica
New Hampshire	Emma	Emily	Abigail	Hannah	Madison	Olivia	Elizabeth	Isabella	Grace	Alexis
New Jersey	Emily	Olivia	Isabella	Samantha	Ashley	Emma	Kayla	Madison	Sarah	Julia
New Mexico	Alyssa, Isabella	Alexis	Emily	Madison	Emma	Destiny	Ashley	Samantha	Abigail, Jasmine	Brianna
New York	Emily	Emma	Olivia	Isabella	Ashley	Samantha	Madison	Sarah	Kayla	Sophia
North Carolina	Emma	Emily	Madison	Hannah	Sarah	Abigail	Olivia	Elizabeth	Ashley	Anna
North Dakota	Madison	Emma	Emily	Grace	Olivia	Hannah	Abigail	Alexis	Elizabeth	Ava
Ohio	Emma	Madison	Emily	Olivia	Hannah	Abigail	Grace	Alexis	Elizabeth	Isabella
Oklahoma	Madison	Emily	Emma	Alexis	Hannah	Abigail	Chloe	Elizabeth	Alyssa	Olivia
Oregon	Emily	Emma	Madison	Grace	Hannah	Olivia	Elizabeth	Sophia	Abigail	Isabella
Pennsylvania	Emily	Emma	Madison	Olivia	Abigail	Hannah	Grace	Sarah	Isabella	Alexis
Rhode Island	Emily	Madison	Emma, Isabella	Olivia	Sophia	Abigail	Hannah	Grace	Ashley, Julia	Samantha, Sarah
South Carolina	Madison	Emily	Emma	Hannah	Abigail	Olivia, Sarah	Elizabeth	Anna	Alexis	Taylor
South Dakota	Madison	Emma	Emily	Olivia	Hannah	Grace	Elizabeth	Ella	Alexis, Morgan	Abigail
Tennessee	Madison	Emma	Emily	Hannah	Abigail	Olivia	Anna	Alexis	Sarah	Elizabeth
Texas	Emily	Ashley	Madison	Emma	Alyssa	Abigail	Samantha	Hannah	Alexis	Isabella
Utah	Emma	Emily	Olivia	Madison	Abigail	Samantha	Hannah	Brooklyn	Elizabeth	Grace
Vermont	Emma	Emily	Olivia	Madison	Abigail	Hannah	Alexis	Elizabeth	Anna	Grace
Virginia	Emily	Madison	Emma	Hannah	Olivia	Abigail	Elizabeth	Sarah	Alexis	Grace
Washington	Emma	Emily	Olivia	Isabella	Madison	Hannah	Grace	Sophia	Elizabeth	Abigail
West Virginia	Madison	Emily	Hannah	Emma	Alexis	Abigail	Olivia	Isabella	Haley	Alyssa
Wisconsin	Emma	Olivia	Emily	Abigail	Grace	Hannah	Ella	Madison	Elizabeth	Samantha
Wyoming	Madison	Emma	Alexis, Elizabeth	Hannah	Abigail, Emily	Taylor	Grace	Ashley, Hailey, Isabella, Morgan, Olivia	Bailey, Sarah	Natalie

== 2005 ==
Male names
Region	No. 1	No. 2	No. 3	No. 4	No. 5	No. 6	No. 7	No. 8	No. 9	No. 10
Alabama	William	Joshua	James	John	Michael	Jacob	Christopher	Ethan	Matthew	Jackson
Alaska	Ethan	Jacob	Joshua	Michael	Joseph, William	Benjamin	John, Logan	Elijah, Ryan	Matthew	Aiden, Andrew, Daniel, David, Tyler, Zachary
Arizona	Angel	Jacob	Jose	Daniel, Michael	Anthony	Jesus	Joshua	David	Gabriel	Joseph
Arkansas	Ethan	William	Jacob	Joshua	James, Michael	Caleb	Christopher	Tyler	Logan	Noah
California	Daniel	Anthony	Angel	David	Joshua	Jose	Andrew	Jacob	Matthew	Michael
Colorado	Jacob	Joshua	Alexander	Joseph	Ethan	Tyler	Daniel	Michael	Andrew	Anthony
Connecticut	Ryan	Matthew	Michael	Nicholas	Anthony	Joshua, William	Alexander	Andrew	John	Jacob
Delaware	Michael	Matthew	Ryan	Joshua	Jacob	Anthony, Nicholas	Alexander	Andrew, William	James	John
District of Columbia	William	John	James	Michael	Alexander	Kevin	Daniel	Anthony	Charles	Christopher
Florida	Joshua	Michael	Anthony	Christopher	Jacob	Daniel	Matthew	Nicholas	Alexander	David
Georgia	William	Joshua	Christopher	Jacob	Michael	James	John	Andrew, David	Ethan	Christian
Hawaii	Joshua	Jacob	Noah	Ethan	Elijah, Isaiah	Matthew	Dylan, Tyler	Alexander, Caleb, Christian	Jayden	Michael
Idaho	Ethan	Jacob	Gabriel	Michael, Samuel	Logan	Andrew	Tyler	Carter	Alexander, Joshua	Isaac
Illinois	Michael	Jacob	Daniel	Alexander	Matthew	Joseph	Joshua	Anthony	Andrew	Ryan
Indiana	Jacob	Ethan	Andrew	Joshua	Michael	William	Noah	Elijah	Tyler	Alexander
Iowa	Ethan	Jacob	Logan	Andrew	Tyler	Benjamin	Carter	Joseph, Noah	Ryan	Alexander
Kansas	Jacob	Ethan	Andrew	Joseph	Logan, Michael	Tyler	Daniel, Joshua	Alexander	Nathan	William
Kentucky	Jacob	Ethan	William	James	Joshua	Matthew	Michael	Andrew	Logan	Austin
Louisiana	Joshua	Ethan	Michael	Jacob	William	John	Christopher	Landon	Tyler	Matthew
Maine	Jacob	Tyler	Alexander	Benjamin	Andrew, Zachary	Nicholas	Noah	Ethan, Logan	Matthew, William	Michael
Maryland	Joshua	Michael	Ryan, William	Matthew	Christopher, Jacob	Andrew	Daniel	Joseph	James	Nicholas
Massachusetts	Matthew	Michael	Ryan	Nicholas	John	Joseph	Andrew	Jacob	William	Anthony
Michigan	Jacob	Andrew	Ethan	Joshua	Michael	Joseph	Tyler	Alexander	Matthew	Ryan
Minnesota	Ethan	Jacob	Samuel	Jack	Andrew	Benjamin	Joseph	Alexander	Logan	William
Mississippi	William	James	John	Christopher	Jacob	Michael	Joshua	Ethan	Tyler	Cameron
Missouri	Jacob	Ethan	William	Andrew	Tyler	Logan	Joshua	Michael	Alexander	Matthew
Montana	Jacob	Ethan	Michael	Joseph	Logan	Ryan	Tyler, William	Andrew	Hunter, James	Samuel
Nebraska	Jacob	Ethan	Samuel	Alexander	Noah	Joshua	Jackson	Benjamin, Dylan, Jack	Caleb	Michael, William
Nevada	Anthony, Jacob	Daniel	Joshua	Angel	Michael	Jose	David	Brandon, Christian, Christopher	Alexander	Matthew
New Hampshire	Jacob	Ryan	Matthew	Benjamin	Aiden, Tyler	Ethan	Nicholas	Alexander, Andrew	Joseph, William	Aidan, Jack
New Jersey	Michael	Matthew	Ryan	Anthony	Joseph	Nicholas	Christopher	Daniel	John	Andrew
New Mexico	Joshua	Isaiah	Jacob	Daniel	Elijah	Gabriel, Jose	Michael	Anthony	Joseph	Isaac, Matthew
New York	Michael	Matthew	Joseph	Anthony	Ryan	Nicholas	Daniel	Christopher	Joshua	David
North Carolina	William	Joshua	Jacob	Christopher	Michael	Ethan	James	Matthew	Andrew	David
North Dakota	Ethan	Jacob	Carter, Noah	Dylan	Logan	Hunter	Connor, Jack	Alexander	Andrew, Michael, Tyler	Joseph
Ohio	Jacob	Andrew	Ethan	Michael	Logan	Nicholas	Matthew	William	Tyler	Joshua
Oklahoma	Jacob	Ethan	Joshua	Michael	William	Tyler	Christopher	Andrew	Matthew	Logan
Oregon	Jacob	Ethan	Andrew	Joshua	Alexander	Benjamin, Tyler	David	Logan	Daniel, Ryan	Noah
Pennsylvania	Michael	Jacob	Matthew	Ryan	Nicholas	Joseph	Joshua	Ethan	Tyler	Andrew
Rhode Island	Michael	Matthew	Jacob	Ethan, Ryan	Joshua	Nicholas	Tyler	Christopher	Joseph	Alexander
South Carolina	William	Jacob	James, Joshua	John	Michael	Christopher	Ethan	Matthew	Andrew	Tyler
South Dakota	Jacob	Ethan	Carter	Tyler	Landon	Andrew	Gavin, Samuel	Jackson, Logan	Joseph, Mason, Noah	Alexander
Tennessee	William	Jacob	Ethan	James	Joshua	Andrew	Michael	Christopher	Matthew	John
Texas	Jose	Jacob	Joshua	Daniel	Christopher	David	Angel	Juan	Michael	Anthony
Utah	Jacob	Ethan	Joshua	Samuel	Andrew	Tyler	William	Joseph	Isaac	Alexander
Vermont	Jacob	Connor	Matthew, Samuel	Ryan, William	Noah	Benjamin	Aiden, Ethan	Andrew, Evan	Michael	Nathan
Virginia	William	Jacob	Michael	Joshua	Matthew	Ethan	Christopher	Andrew	Ryan	James
Washington	Jacob	Ethan	Alexander	Andrew	Daniel	Michael	Joshua	Tyler	David	Logan
West Virginia	Jacob	Ethan	Hunter	Logan	Andrew	James	Tyler	William	Michael	Matthew
Wisconsin	Ethan	Jacob	Alexander, Tyler	Logan	Andrew	Benjamin	Samuel	Mason	Joshua	Matthew, Nicholas
Wyoming	Jacob	Ethan	Tyler	Michael	Joseph	James, Joshua	Connor, David	Alexander, Caleb, Hunter, Wyatt	Austin	Andrew, Dylan, Noah

Female names
Region	No. 1	No. 2	No. 3	No. 4	No. 5	No. 6	No. 7	No. 8	No. 9	No. 10
Alabama	Madison	Emma	Emily	Anna	Hannah	Abigail	Mary, Sarah	Chloe	Olivia	Elizabeth
Alaska	Madison	Emma	Emily	Isabella, Samantha	Hannah	Abigail, Olivia	Elizabeth	Grace	Alexis, Anna, Jessica, Lillian, Sophia	Ava
Arizona	Emily	Mia	Ashley	Isabella	Emma	Samantha	Abigail	Madison, Sophia	Elizabeth	Alexis
Arkansas	Emily, Madison	Emma	Hannah	Alexis	Abigail	Olivia	Anna	Elizabeth	Chloe, Lauren, Natalie	Ella
California	Emily	Ashley	Samantha	Isabella	Mia	Natalie	Sophia	Emma	Alyssa	Madison
Colorado	Emily	Emma	Isabella, Madison	Abigail	Olivia	Hannah	Samantha	Ashley	Ella, Sophia	Elizabeth
Connecticut	Olivia	Emily	Ava	Emma	Isabella	Madison	Abigail	Grace	Sophia	Samantha
Delaware	Madison	Emily	Sarah	Emma	Abigail, Alexis, Samantha	Olivia	Ava	Natalie	Elizabeth	Hannah
District of Columbia	Sophia	Olivia	Elizabeth, Kayla	Katherine	Emily	Alexandra, Anna, Ashley, Ava, Emma	Abigail, Grace, Lauren	Destiny	Caroline, Sarah	Isabella, Julia, Natalie
Florida	Emily	Isabella	Madison	Emma	Sophia	Ashley	Samantha	Brianna	Hannah	Olivia
Georgia	Emily	Madison	Emma	Hannah	Abigail	Elizabeth	Sarah	Ashley	Olivia	Ava
Hawaii	Emma	Mia	Madison	Kayla, Taylor	Alyssa	Samantha	Sophia	Isabella, Trinity	Jasmine	Grace, Kiana
Idaho	Emma	Madison	Emily	Hailey	Abigail	Hannah, Olivia	Alexis	Grace	Samantha	Elizabeth
Illinois	Emily	Emma	Olivia	Isabella	Abigail	Ava	Grace	Samantha	Elizabeth	Mia
Indiana	Emma	Madison	Emily	Abigail, Olivia	Hannah	Ava	Grace	Alexis	Elizabeth	Chloe
Iowa	Emma	Olivia	Madison	Emily	Ava	Hannah	Grace	Ella	Abigail	Elizabeth
Kansas	Emma	Emily	Olivia	Abigail	Madison	Grace	Hannah	Alexis	Elizabeth	Ava
Kentucky	Madison	Emily	Emma	Hannah	Abigail	Olivia	Alexis	Sarah	Chloe	Haley
Louisiana	Madison	Emma	Emily	Hannah	Olivia	Chloe	Abigail	Ava	Alexis	Alyssa
Maine	Emma	Abigail	Emily, Hannah	Madison	Olivia	Grace	Isabella	Sophia	Ava, Elizabeth	Lily
Maryland	Emily	Madison	Emma	Abigail	Kayla	Olivia	Sophia	Hannah	Grace	Sarah
Massachusetts	Emma	Emily	Ava	Olivia	Sophia	Abigail	Isabella	Julia	Madison	Grace
Michigan	Emma	Emily	Madison	Olivia	Ava	Grace	Abigail	Hannah	Isabella	Alexis
Minnesota	Ava	Grace	Emma	Ella, Emily	Olivia	Abigail	Madison	Sophia	Hannah	Anna
Mississippi	Madison	Emma	Anna	Emily	Hannah	Alexis	Destiny	Olivia	Mary	Makayla
Missouri	Emma	Madison	Emily	Abigail	Olivia	Hannah	Grace	Alexis	Chloe	Elizabeth
Montana	Emma	Madison	Emily, Olivia	Alexis, Hannah	Abigail	Isabella	Sophia	Hailey	Ella, Taylor	Grace
Nebraska	Emma	Emily	Madison	Grace	Olivia	Ava	Hannah	Elizabeth	Ella	Abigail
Nevada	Emily	Ashley, Samantha	Isabella	Madison	Emma	Mia	Elizabeth, Natalie	Olivia	Sophia	Abigail
New Hampshire	Emma	Emily	Madison	Olivia	Ava	Abigail	Hannah	Grace	Sophia	Isabella
New Jersey	Emily	Isabella	Ava	Olivia	Samantha	Madison	Ashley	Sophia	Emma	Julia
New Mexico	Alyssa	Emily	Madison	Isabella	Destiny	Alexis	Ashley	Mia	Samantha	Angelina
New York	Emily	Isabella	Emma	Olivia	Madison	Samantha	Sophia	Ashley	Ava	Sarah
North Carolina	Emily	Emma	Madison	Hannah	Abigail	Olivia	Sarah	Elizabeth	Ashley	Anna
North Dakota	Emma	Hannah	Madison	Olivia	Grace	Emily	Ava	Abigail, Ella	Alexis, Hailey	Elizabeth
Ohio	Emma	Madison	Olivia	Emily	Ava	Hannah	Abigail	Alexis	Grace	Isabella
Oklahoma	Emma	Madison	Emily	Hannah	Abigail	Alexis	Chloe	Elizabeth	Alyssa	Olivia
Oregon	Emma	Emily	Madison	Hannah	Olivia	Abigail	Sophia	Grace	Isabella	Ava, Samantha
Pennsylvania	Emily	Emma	Madison	Olivia	Abigail	Ava	Isabella	Hannah	Grace	Sarah
Rhode Island	Olivia	Ava	Abigail, Emily	Isabella, Madison	Emma, Sophia	Hannah	Samantha	Grace	Julia	Lily
South Carolina	Emily	Madison	Emma	Hannah	Abigail	Olivia	Elizabeth	Anna	Sarah	Taylor
South Dakota	Emma, Madison, Olivia	Emily	Hannah	Grace	Abigail	Alexis	Ava	Ella	Elizabeth	Taylor
Tennessee	Madison	Emma	Emily	Hannah	Abigail	Olivia	Chloe	Alexis	Elizabeth	Anna
Texas	Emily	Mia	Madison	Ashley	Emma	Abigail	Samantha	Natalie	Alyssa	Hannah
Utah	Emma	Emily	Olivia	Abigail	Hannah	Madison	Samantha	Brooklyn	Grace	Elizabeth
Vermont	Emma	Emily	Olivia	Hannah	Madison	Abigail	Ella	Ava	Alexis, Grace	Hailey
Virginia	Emily	Madison	Emma	Hannah	Abigail	Sarah	Olivia	Elizabeth	Alexis	Sophia
Washington	Emma	Emily	Madison	Olivia	Isabella	Ava	Sophia	Samantha	Abigail	Hannah
West Virginia	Madison	Emily	Emma	Hannah	Olivia	Abigail	Alexis	Chloe	Kaylee	Isabella
Wisconsin	Emma	Olivia	Emily	Ava	Abigail	Grace	Madison	Hannah	Ella	Elizabeth
Wyoming	Madison	Emma	Hailey, Hannah	Olivia	Abigail	Sarah	Emily, Samantha	Mackenzie, Sydney	Ava	Grace

== 2006 ==
Male names
Region	No. 1	No. 2	No. 3	No. 4	No. 5	No. 6	No. 7	No. 8	No. 9	No. 10
Alabama	William	Jacob	James	Joshua	John	Michael	Jackson	Christopher	Ethan	Matthew
Alaska	James	Jacob, Michael	Andrew, Ethan	Logan	Benjamin	William	Alexander	Aiden	John, Joshua	Gabriel, Samuel
Arizona	Angel	Daniel	Jacob	Anthony	Jose	Jesus	Michael	Joshua	Luis	Gabriel
Arkansas	William	Ethan, Jacob	James	Landon	Joshua	Christopher	Caleb	Jackson	Logan	John, Matthew
California	Daniel	Anthony	Angel	Jacob	David	Andrew	Jose	Joshua	Christopher	Matthew
Colorado	Jacob	Ethan	Alexander	Joshua	Noah	Logan	Andrew	Michael	Daniel	Benjamin
Connecticut	Michael	Matthew	Ryan	Nicholas	Anthony	Alexander	Joseph	William	Jacob	John
Delaware	Ryan	Michael	Jacob, John, Matthew	Nicholas	Christopher, Joshua	Anthony, Ethan, James	Alexander	William	Logan	Andrew, Nathan
District of Columbia	William	Michael	Christopher	Anthony	Alexander, Daniel	John	Kevin	James	Joshua	Samuel
Florida	Joshua	Michael	Anthony	Christopher	Jacob	Daniel	Matthew	David	Alexander	Nicholas
Georgia	William	Joshua	Christopher	Jacob	Michael	James	Andrew	Matthew	Ethan	David
Hawaii	Noah	Joshua	Ethan	Dylan	Jacob	Elijah, Tyler	Logan	Isaiah	Caleb	James, William
Idaho	Ethan	Jacob	Noah	Joshua	Logan, Samuel	Andrew	Isaac	Jackson, William	Tyler	Matthew, Michael
Illinois	Daniel	Michael	Jacob	Alexander	Joshua	Anthony	Matthew	Joseph	Andrew	Ryan
Indiana	Jacob	Ethan	Andrew	Michael	William	Joshua	Logan	Noah	Matthew	Elijah
Iowa	Ethan	Jacob	Noah	Logan	Andrew	Carter	William	Jackson	Owen, Tyler	Alexander, Caleb
Kansas	Jacob	Ethan	Logan	Alexander	William	Andrew	Michael	Joshua	Noah	Gabriel
Kentucky	Jacob	William	Ethan	James	Landon	Logan	Christopher	Michael	Austin	Andrew
Louisiana	Ethan	Landon	Joshua	Jacob	Christopher	Michael, Noah	Cameron, John	William	Christian	Tyler
Maine	Jacob	Ethan	Benjamin	Tyler	Logan	Hunter, Owen, Samuel	Aiden, Connor, Noah, Ryan	Dylan	Caleb	Matthew
Maryland	Joshua	Michael	Jacob	William	Matthew	Ryan	Christopher	Daniel	Andrew	Nicholas
Massachusetts	Matthew	Ryan	Michael	Nicholas	Andrew	John	Joseph	Jacob	William	Jack
Michigan	Jacob	Ethan	Michael	Andrew, Logan	Alexander	Noah	Joshua	Tyler	Joseph	Matthew
Minnesota	Ethan	Jacob	Logan	Benjamin	Jack	Noah	William	Andrew	Samuel	Joseph
Mississippi	William	James	Joshua	Christopher	John	Michael	Jacob	Tyler	Ethan	Jordan
Missouri	Jacob	Logan	Andrew	Ethan	William	Michael	Tyler	Noah	Alexander	James, Joshua
Montana	Jacob	Logan	Michael, William	Noah	James	Ethan	Alexander, Ryan	Wyatt	Aiden, Joseph	Tyler
Nebraska	Jacob	Alexander	Ethan	Andrew	Logan	Jackson	William	Noah, Samuel	Michael	Joseph, Joshua
Nevada	Anthony	Angel	Daniel	Jacob	Alexander	David	Michael	Joshua	Joseph	Christopher
New Hampshire	Jacob	Ryan	Benjamin	William	Logan	Andrew	Michael, Owen	Nicholas, Tyler	Cameron, Ethan, Matthew	Noah
New Jersey	Michael	Matthew	Daniel	Joseph	Anthony	Ryan	Nicholas	Christopher	Joshua	Alexander
New Mexico	Isaiah, Joshua	Gabriel	Daniel	Joseph	Jacob	Diego	Elijah	Michael	Angel, Matthew	Christopher
New York	Michael	Matthew	Joseph	Anthony	Daniel	Christopher	Nicholas	Ryan	Joshua	Alexander
North Carolina	William	Joshua	Jacob	Christopher	Michael	Ethan	James	Matthew	Andrew	Noah
North Dakota	Logan	Jacob	Ethan	Carter	Noah	Benjamin	Alexander, Hunter	Jack	Samuel	Gavin, Mason, Wyatt
Ohio	Jacob	Andrew	Ethan	Michael	Noah	Joshua	Logan	Matthew	William	Alexander
Oklahoma	Jacob	Ethan	Joshua	William	Michael	Logan	James	Landon	Christopher	Caleb
Oregon	Jacob	Ethan	Alexander	Logan	Noah	Daniel	Joshua	William	Tyler	Andrew
Pennsylvania	Jacob	Michael	Ryan	Joseph	Matthew	Logan	Anthony	Joshua	Ethan	Nicholas
Rhode Island	Ryan	Jacob	Nicholas	Michael	Christopher	Alexander, Benjamin, Joshua	Matthew	Ethan, Nathan	Andrew, John	Anthony
South Carolina	William	Christopher	James	Jacob	Joshua	John	Michael	Ethan	Noah	Matthew
South Dakota	Jacob	Ethan	Carter, Logan, Mason	Landon	Hunter	Joshua	Jackson, Samuel	Noah	Andrew, Michael	Alexander
Tennessee	William	Jacob	Joshua	Ethan	James	Christopher	Michael	Noah	Andrew, Elijah	John
Texas	Jose	Jacob	Joshua	Daniel	Christopher	Angel	David	Juan	Michael	Ethan
Utah	Ethan	Joshua	Jacob	Samuel	Benjamin	Jackson	William	Isaac	Mason	Logan
Vermont	Jacob	William	Noah	Owen	Aiden	Nicholas, Tyler	Dylan	Ethan, Ryan	James	Benjamin, Joshua
Virginia	William	Jacob	Michael	Joshua	Christopher	Ethan	Andrew	Matthew	James	Joseph
Washington	Jacob	Alexander	Ethan	Daniel	Logan	Andrew	Samuel	Michael	Nathan	Benjamin
West Virginia	Jacob	Ethan	Logan	Landon	Hunter	James	Andrew	Noah	Michael	Joshua, William
Wisconsin	Ethan	Jacob	Logan	Mason	Alexander	Noah	Benjamin, Tyler	Owen	Michael	Evan
Wyoming	Ethan	Jacob, Logan	Ryan	Hunter	William	Samuel	Joshua, Michael	Wyatt	Aiden, James, Joseph	Aidan, Mason, Matthew

Female names
Region	No. 1	No. 2	No. 3	No. 4	No. 5	No. 6	No. 7	No. 8	No. 9	No. 10
Alabama	Madison	Emma	Anna	Emily	Hannah	Sarah	Elizabeth	Olivia	Abigail	Isabella
Alaska	Emma	Emily, Madison	Isabella	Ava, Elizabeth	Hannah	Olivia	Sophia	Abigail, Alyssa	Kaylee	Lily
Arizona	Mia	Emily	Isabella	Ashley	Emma	Madison	Ava	Sophia	Samantha	Alexis
Arkansas	Madison	Emily	Emma	Hannah	Abigail	Alexis	Elizabeth	Olivia	Chloe	Anna
California	Emily	Isabella	Ashley	Mia	Samantha	Natalie	Sophia	Emma	Abigail	Ava
Colorado	Isabella	Emily	Emma	Hannah	Abigail	Madison	Sophia	Ava	Olivia	Samantha
Connecticut	Isabella	Emily	Ava	Olivia	Emma	Madison	Grace	Julia	Abigail	Sophia
Delaware	Madison	Emily	Ava	Emma	Olivia	Isabella	Grace, Kayla	Elizabeth	Hannah	Abigail, Sophia
District of Columbia	Katherine	Elizabeth	Ashley	Ava	Sophia	Olivia, Sofia	Caroline, Hannah	Abigail, Emily, Maya	Anna, Madison	Nevaeh
Florida	Isabella	Emily	Madison	Sophia	Emma	Ava	Olivia	Mia	Hannah	Brianna
Georgia	Madison	Emily	Emma	Hannah	Ava	Olivia	Abigail	Ashley	Isabella	Anna
Hawaii	Isabella	Emma, Madison	Hailey	Ava	Kayla, Malia	Mia	Emily	Jasmine, Taylor	Sophia	Chloe
Idaho	Emma	Olivia	Abigail	Hannah, Madison	Emily	Ava	Hailey	Taylor	Elizabeth, Grace	Isabella
Illinois	Emily	Isabella	Emma	Olivia	Ava	Abigail	Madison	Grace	Sophia	Mia
Indiana	Emma	Ava	Olivia	Madison	Emily	Abigail	Hannah	Chloe	Isabella	Addison, Elizabeth
Iowa	Emma	Ava	Olivia	Madison	Hannah	Addison	Abigail	Grace	Emily	Elizabeth
Kansas	Emma	Emily	Abigail	Madison	Ava	Alexis	Addison	Olivia	Hannah	Grace
Kentucky	Madison	Emma	Emily	Hannah	Abigail	Olivia	Alexis	Chloe	Ava	Isabella
Louisiana	Madison	Emma	Ava	Emily	Hannah	Abigail	Olivia	Isabella	Chloe	Alyssa
Maine	Emma	Abigail	Emily	Olivia	Madison	Ava	Alexis	Isabella	Sophia	Hannah
Maryland	Madison	Emily	Abigail	Emma	Ava	Isabella	Sophia	Olivia	Sarah	Hannah
Massachusetts	Ava	Isabella	Emma	Sophia	Olivia	Emily	Abigail	Julia	Grace	Madison
Michigan	Ava	Emma	Madison	Olivia	Emily	Isabella	Grace	Hannah	Sophia	Abigail
Minnesota	Ava	Grace, Olivia	Emma	Sophia	Ella	Abigail	Emily	Hannah	Isabella	Elizabeth
Mississippi	Madison	Anna	Emma	Hannah	Emily	Alexis	Chloe	Olivia	Ava	Isabella
Missouri	Emma	Madison	Ava	Abigail	Emily	Hannah	Olivia	Isabella	Alexis	Elizabeth
Montana	Emma	Abigail, Madison	Hannah	Grace	Ava	Olivia	Emily	Ella	Elizabeth, Hailey	Alexis, Isabella, Morgan
Nebraska	Emma	Ava	Madison	Addison	Emily	Hannah	Abigail	Olivia	Grace, Isabella	Chloe
Nevada	Emily	Isabella	Emma	Mia	Ashley	Madison, Samantha	Ava	Sophia	Natalie	Alexa
New Hampshire	Emma	Olivia	Emily	Ava	Madison	Hannah	Abigail	Isabella	Grace, Sarah	Sophia
New Jersey	Isabella	Ava	Emily	Sophia	Olivia	Samantha	Ashley	Madison	Mia, Sarah	Julia
New Mexico	Isabella	Alyssa	Emily	Mia	Madison	Emma	Nevaeh	Mariah	Samantha	Abigail
New York	Emily	Isabella	Ava	Olivia	Madison, Sophia	Emma	Ashley	Samantha	Sarah	Mia
North Carolina	Madison	Emily	Emma	Abigail, Hannah	Ava	Olivia	Sarah	Elizabeth	Isabella	Ashley
North Dakota	Ava	Emma	Grace	Madison	Alexis	Ella, Emily	Olivia	Hannah	Addison	Abigail
Ohio	Emma	Madison	Ava	Olivia	Emily	Abigail	Hannah	Grace	Isabella	Sophia
Oklahoma	Emma	Madison	Emily	Abigail	Hannah	Addison	Chloe	Alexis	Elizabeth	Brooklyn
Oregon	Emma	Emily	Olivia	Madison	Isabella	Abigail	Ava	Hannah	Sophia	Elizabeth
Pennsylvania	Ava	Emily	Emma	Madison	Olivia	Isabella	Abigail	Hannah	Sarah	Alexis
Rhode Island	Isabella	Olivia	Ava	Madison	Emily	Emma	Grace	Abigail	Hannah	Sophia
South Carolina	Madison	Emma	Emily	Hannah	Olivia	Abigail	Elizabeth	Anna	Isabella	Sarah
South Dakota	Emma	Hannah	Ava	Grace	Madison	Addison, Emily	Olivia	Abigail	Hailey	Alexis, Ella
Tennessee	Madison	Emma	Emily	Hannah	Abigail	Olivia	Sarah	Chloe	Alexis	Anna
Texas	Emily	Mia	Ashley	Isabella	Madison	Emma	Abigail	Natalie	Hannah	Samantha
Utah	Emma	Abigail	Olivia	Elizabeth	Emily	Hannah	Brooklyn	Madison	Ava, Samantha	Isabella
Vermont	Emma	Ava	Abigail, Grace, Olivia	Hannah, Isabella	Elizabeth	Alexis, Madison	Sophia	Emily	Hailey, Taylor	Lily
Virginia	Madison	Emily	Abigail	Emma	Hannah	Sarah	Ava	Olivia	Elizabeth	Isabella
Washington	Emma	Emily	Ava	Olivia	Isabella	Madison, Sophia	Abigail	Hannah	Elizabeth	Natalie
West Virginia	Madison	Hannah	Emily	Abigail	Alexis	Emma	Olivia	Isabella	Chloe	Sarah
Wisconsin	Ava	Emma	Emily	Olivia	Isabella	Abigail	Hannah	Grace	Ella	Sophia
Wyoming	Emily	Emma	Madison	Alexis	Hannah	Abigail, Hailey	Grace	Addison, Taylor	Ava	Elizabeth

== 2007 ==
Male names
Region	No. 1	No. 2	No. 3	No. 4	No. 5	No. 6	No. 7	No. 8	No. 9	No. 10
Alabama	William	James	Christopher	Jacob, John	Joshua	Jackson	Michael	Ethan	Noah	Caleb, Cameron, Jayden
Alaska	Aiden	Ethan, Logan	Alexander, Michael	Jacob, William	Tyler	Noah	James	Daniel	Joseph	Gabriel, John, Samuel
Arizona	Angel	Jose	Daniel	Anthony	Jacob	David	Luis	Ethan	Jesus, Michael	Christopher
Arkansas	William	Jacob	Ethan	Jackson	Christopher	James	Logan	Caleb	John, Landon	Joshua
California	Daniel	Anthony	Angel	David, Jacob	Andrew	Christopher	Joshua	Jose	Diego	Alexander
Colorado	Jacob	Daniel	Alexander	Joshua	Ethan	Noah	Joseph	Benjamin	Anthony, Logan	Gabriel
Connecticut	Michael	Matthew, Ryan	Joseph	Anthony	Alexander	William	Nicholas	Christopher	Jacob	Daniel
Delaware	Michael	Ryan	Alexander	Christopher	Joshua	John	Matthew	Jacob	Anthony	James, William
District of Columbia	William	John	Christopher	Michael	Anthony	Alexander	Daniel	Kevin	Andrew, Noah	James, Jonathan, Samuel
Florida	Anthony	Michael	Christopher	Joshua	Daniel	Jayden	Jacob	Alexander	David	Matthew
Georgia	William	Joshua	Christopher	Jacob	Michael	James	Ethan	Jayden	John	David
Hawaii	Noah	Ethan	Joshua	Isaiah	Elijah	Logan	Dylan, Jacob	Jayden	Tyler	Daniel
Idaho	Jacob	Ethan	Logan	Isaac, Joshua	Michael	Daniel	Samuel	Gabriel	Tyler	William
Illinois	Daniel	Anthony	Michael	Jacob	Alexander	Joshua	Matthew	Andrew	William	Christopher
Indiana	Jacob	Ethan	Noah	Logan	Andrew	Elijah	Aiden	Jackson	Alexander	Michael
Iowa	Ethan	Jacob	Logan	Noah	Jackson	Gavin	Carter, William	Alexander	Benjamin	Owen
Kansas	Ethan	Jacob	Alexander	Jackson	Noah	Logan, William	Samuel	Andrew	Christopher	Michael, Tyler
Kentucky	Jacob	William	Ethan	James	Logan	Noah	Joshua	Michael	Christopher	Landon
Louisiana	Joshua	Jacob	Ethan	Michael	Christopher	Noah	Landon	Jayden	William	Joseph
Maine	Ethan	Jacob	Noah	William	Logan	Benjamin	Alexander	Connor	Evan, Joshua, Samuel, Zachary	Owen
Maryland	Michael	Christopher	Joshua	Jacob	William	Ethan	Ryan	Matthew	Anthony	David
Massachusetts	Matthew	Michael	Ryan	William	Jacob	Nicholas	Anthony	Daniel	Andrew	Alexander
Michigan	Jacob	Ethan	Michael	Logan	Noah	Andrew	Alexander	Tyler	Joseph	Joshua
Minnesota	Jacob	Ethan	Logan	Jack	Samuel	Alexander, Noah	Benjamin	Andrew, Gavin	William	Joseph
Mississippi	William	James	Christopher	John	Joshua	Ethan	Jacob	Michael	Jayden	Landon
Missouri	Jacob	Ethan	Logan	Andrew	William	Noah	Michael	Jackson, Mason	Tyler	James
Montana	Ethan	Logan	Jacob	Noah	Mason	William	Samuel, Tyler	Michael, Wyatt	Andrew, Austin, Isaac	Hunter, Ryan
Nebraska	Jacob	Alexander	Jackson	William	Ethan	Noah	Andrew	Logan, Michael	Gavin	Owen
Nevada	Anthony	Angel	Christopher	Jacob	Daniel	Alexander	Michael	David	Joshua	Jose
New Hampshire	Jacob	Logan	Ryan	Connor, Ethan	Andrew	Owen	Benjamin	Alexander, Matthew	Noah, William	Jack
New Jersey	Michael	Matthew	Anthony	Daniel	Joseph	Christopher	Nicholas, Ryan	Joshua	Alexander	Andrew, Justin
New Mexico	Jacob	Joshua	Isaiah	Michael	Gabriel	Daniel	Angel, David	Christopher	Ethan	Diego
New York	Michael	Matthew	Anthony	Daniel	Joseph	Ryan	Christopher	Joshua	Jayden	Nicholas
North Carolina	William	Jacob	Christopher	Joshua	Ethan	Michael	James	Noah	Elijah	Daniel
North Dakota	Logan	Ethan	Jacob	Jack	Alexander	Gavin	Owen	Aiden, Mason	Andrew, Brody, Isaac	Dylan
Ohio	Jacob	Michael	Ethan	Andrew	Logan	William	Alexander	Joshua	Tyler	Joseph, Noah
Oklahoma	Ethan	Jacob	Joshua	William	Noah	James	Michael	Logan	Jackson	David
Oregon	Jacob	Alexander	Logan	Daniel	Ethan	Noah	David	Andrew	William	Anthony
Pennsylvania	Michael	Jacob	Ryan	Matthew	Logan	Joseph	Ethan	Nicholas	Andrew	Anthony
Rhode Island	Michael	Anthony, Jacob	Nicholas	Ethan	Matthew	Alexander	David	Christopher	Jayden, Nathan	Benjamin, Joseph, Joshua, Ryan
South Carolina	William	James	Christopher	Michael	Joshua	Jacob	Ethan	Jayden	John	Noah
South Dakota	Ethan	Mason	Jacob	Gavin	Noah	Jackson	Tyler, William	Carson, Carter, Hunter, Jack	Alexander	Aiden, Evan
Tennessee	William	Jacob	Ethan	James	Joshua	Christopher	Jackson	Michael	Noah	Elijah
Texas	William	Jacob	Ethan	James	Joshua	Christopher	Jackson	Michael	Noah	Elijah
Utah	Ethan	Jacob	Benjamin, Joshua	Samuel	William	Isaac, Mason	James	Andrew	Gavin, Logan	Jackson
Vermont	Logan	Jacob	Alexander	Mason, Noah	Caleb	Aiden, Ethan, Ryan	Owen, Samuel, Wyatt	Evan, Jackson, William	Michael, Nicholas	Benjamin, Hunter
Virginia	William	Jacob	Christopher	Joshua	Michael	Ethan	James	Matthew	Ryan	Daniel
Washington	Jacob	Ethan	Alexander	Daniel	Logan	Noah	Benjamin	David	Michael	Andrew, Samuel
West Virginia	Jacob	Ethan	Logan	Austin	Hunter, Michael	Gavin, Tyler	Noah	Matthew	James, Joshua	Landon
Wisconsin	Ethan	Jacob	Logan	Mason	Alexander	Owen	Noah	Jack	Benjamin	Tyler
Wyoming	James	Ethan	William	Gavin	Logan	Michael	Wyatt	Brayden, Gabriel, Hunter, Jacob, Noah	Joshua	Aiden, Landon

Female names
Region	No. 1	No. 2	No. 3	No. 4	No. 5	No. 6	No. 7	No. 8	No. 9	No. 10
Alabama	Emma	Madison	Emily, Hannah	Elizabeth	Ava	Addison	Anna	Olivia	Abigail	Chloe
Alaska	Isabella	Emily, Madison	Ava	Abigail, Emma	Sophia	Olivia	Alyssa	Natalie	Hannah	Hailey, Lillian
Arizona	Isabella	Emily	Mia	Sophia	Ashley	Emma	Madison	Ava	Samantha	Elizabeth
Arkansas	Madison	Emma	Emily	Addison	Olivia	Abigail, Hannah	Ava	Chloe	Alexis	Isabella
California	Emily	Isabella	Sophia	Ashley	Samantha	Mia	Natalie	Emma	Alyssa	Jocelyn
Colorado	Isabella	Sophia	Emma	Olivia	Abigail	Emily	Addison	Madison	Ava	Hannah
Connecticut	Isabella	Olivia	Ava	Emma	Emily	Sophia	Abigail	Madison	Julia	Grace
Delaware	Ava, Sophia	Emily	Madison	Abigail	Isabella	Emma	Olivia	Alyssa	Hannah	Ashley
District of Columbia	Ashley	Sophia	Katherine	Elizabeth	Caroline	Kayla, Madison, Olivia	Isabella	Zoe	Abigail, Anna	Emily, Hannah, Jennifer
Florida	Isabella	Sophia	Emily	Madison	Ava	Emma	Olivia	Mia	Abigail	Ashley
Georgia	Madison	Emily	Emma	Ava	Abigail	Hannah	Elizabeth	Isabella	Olivia	Addison
Hawaii	Sophia	Ava	Chloe	Isabella	Emma	Madison	Mia	Maya	Hailey	Emily, Olivia
Idaho	Emma	Olivia	Emily	Hannah	Abigail	Addison	Elizabeth	Ava	Hailey	Madison
Illinois	Isabella	Olivia	Emily	Sophia	Ava	Emma	Abigail	Madison	Mia	Elizabeth
Indiana	Emma	Ava	Olivia	Madison	Addison	Abigail	Emily	Isabella	Hannah	Elizabeth
Iowa	Ava	Emma	Addison	Olivia	Grace	Ella	Abigail, Madison	Sophia	Emily	Elizabeth, Hannah
Kansas	Addison	Emma	Ava	Madison	Emily	Abigail	Elizabeth	Olivia	Isabella	Hannah, Sophia
Kentucky	Madison	Emma	Emily	Addison	Olivia	Abigail	Hannah	Ava	Isabella	Alexis
Louisiana	Madison	Ava	Emma	Isabella	Olivia	Emily	Addison	Abigail	Chloe, Hannah	Alyssa
Maine	Madison	Abigail	Olivia	Emma	Ava	Hannah	Emily	Isabella	Ella	Grace
Maryland	Madison	Emily	Ava	Olivia	Abigail	Sophia	Emma	Isabella	Hannah	Grace
Massachusetts	Ava	Isabella	Sophia	Olivia	Emma	Emily	Abigail	Madison	Ella	Hannah
Michigan	Ava	Madison	Emma	Olivia	Isabella	Addison	Sophia	Emily	Abigail	Grace
Minnesota	Ava	Olivia	Emma	Sophia	Addison	Grace	Abigail, Ella	Isabella	Emily	Hannah
Mississippi	Madison	Emma	Chloe	Hannah	Addison	Anna	Olivia	Emily	Elizabeth	Ava
Missouri	Emma	Madison	Ava	Addison	Olivia	Sophia	Abigail	Emily	Isabella	Hannah
Montana	Madison	Emma	Olivia	Addison	Emily	Ava, Isabella	Abigail, Alexis	Chloe, Sophia	Elizabeth, Hannah, Taylor	Hailey
Nebraska	Addison	Emma	Ava	Elizabeth	Emily	Grace, Olivia	Madison	Sophia	Ella, Isabella	Hannah
Nevada	Emily, Sophia	Isabella	Madison	Ava	Emma	Samantha	Ashley	Mia	Abigail	Elizabeth
New Hampshire	Olivia	Abigail, Ava	Emma	Madison	Sophia	Isabella	Emily	Hannah	Elizabeth	Ella
New Jersey	Isabella	Emily	Sophia	Ava	Olivia	Samantha	Ashley	Madison	Emma	Gianna
New Mexico	Isabella	Sophia	Nevaeh	Alyssa, Emily, Mia	Abigail	Ava, Madison	Alexis	Samantha	Emma	Destiny, Hannah
New York	Isabella	Sophia	Emily	Olivia	Ava	Madison	Emma	Samantha	Sarah	Ashley
North Carolina	Madison	Emma	Emily	Ava	Abigail	Olivia	Hannah	Elizabeth	Isabella	Addison
North Dakota	Emma	Olivia	Ava	Madison	Abigail	Addison, Emily	Grace	Hannah, Sophia	Taylor	Ella
Ohio	Ava	Madison	Olivia	Emma	Isabella	Abigail	Addison	Sophia	Hannah	Emily
Oklahoma	Emma	Madison	Emily	Addison	Hannah	Elizabeth	Ava	Isabella	Abigail	Chloe
Oregon	Emma	Sophia	Isabella	Emily	Olivia	Elizabeth	Abigail, Hannah	Ava, Madison	Natalie	Addison, Grace
Pennsylvania	Ava	Olivia	Emma	Madison	Isabella	Abigail	Emily	Sophia	Hannah	Sarah
Rhode Island	Sophia	Ava	Isabella	Madison	Olivia	Emily, Emma	Abigail	Hannah	Gianna	Grace, Mia
South Carolina	Madison	Emma	Emily	Abigail, Ava	Olivia	Hannah	Elizabeth	Addison	Isabella	Alyssa
South Dakota	Ava	Emma, Olivia	Addison	Hannah	Grace	Madison	Emily	Elizabeth, Ella	Abigail	Sophia
Tennessee	Emma	Madison	Emily	Addison	Abigail	Hannah	Ava	Chloe	Elizabeth	Olivia
Texas	Emily	Mia	Isabella	Madison	Abigail	Ashley	Sophia	Emma	Alyssa	Elizabeth
Utah	Olivia	Emma	Abigail	Elizabeth	Ava	Addison	Brooklyn	Emily	Sophia	Madison
Vermont	Ava	Emma	Abigail	Olivia	Ella, Madison	Emily	Sophia	Hannah	Grace	Amelia, Lily
Virginia	Madison	Abigail	Emily	Olivia	Emma	Isabella	Hannah	Elizabeth	Ava	Sophia
Washington	Olivia	Emily	Emma	Isabella, Sophia	Ava	Abigail	Elizabeth	Madison	Hannah	Grace
West Virginia	Madison	Emma	Emily	Abigail	Hannah	Isabella	Alexis	Olivia	Ava	Chloe
Wisconsin	Ava	Emma	Olivia	Sophia	Addison	Isabella	Emily	Ella	Elizabeth	Abigail
Wyoming	Madison	Emma	Abigail	Taylor	Alexis, Hannah	Addison	Elizabeth	Brooklyn, Lily	Emily, Grace	Ava, Hailey, Samantha

== 2008 ==
Male names
Region	No. 1	No. 2	No. 3	No. 4	No. 5	No. 6	No. 7	No. 8	No. 9	No. 10
Alabama	William	John	James	Jacob	Christopher	Joshua	Michael	Jackson	Jayden	Ethan
Alaska	James	Jacob	Michael	Ethan	Tyler	Aiden	Joshua	Joseph	Noah	Matthew
Arizona	Anthony	Daniel	Angel	Alexander	Jacob	Michael	Ethan	Jose	Jesus	Joshua
Arkansas	Jacob	Ethan	William	Landon	Joshua	Jackson	Aiden	James	Hunter	Christopher
California	Daniel	Anthony	Angel	Jacob	David	Alexander	Andrew	Joshua	Christopher	Jose
Colorado	Alexander	Jacob	William	Ethan	Noah	Gabriel	Joshua	Daniel	Anthony	Elijah
Connecticut	Michael	Ryan	Matthew	Alexander	Jacob	Christopher	William	Anthony	Nicholas	Andrew
Delaware	Michael	Jacob	William	Christopher	Joshua	Jayden	Anthony	James	John	Ryan
District of Columbia	William	Alexander	Michael	John	Christopher	Samuel	Daniel	Kevin	Elijah	James
Florida	Jayden	Joshua	Michael	Anthony	Christopher	Daniel	Jacob	Alexander	Matthew	David
Georgia	William	Christopher	Joshua	Michael	Jacob	Jayden	Ethan	James	Elijah	David
Hawaii	Ethan	Noah	Isaiah	Jayden	Elijah	Joshua	Jacob	Aiden	Tyler	James
Idaho	Ethan	William	Jacob	Alexander	Logan	Aiden	Carter	Michael	Samuel	Daniel
Illinois	Alexander	Daniel	Michael	Jacob	Anthony	Ethan	Joshua	Joseph	William	Matthew
Indiana	Jacob	Ethan	Noah	William	Aiden	Elijah	Alexander	Jackson	Michael	Logan
Iowa	Ethan	William	Carter	Jackson	Logan	Noah	Jacob	Gavin	Benjamin	Landon
Kansas	Ethan	Aiden	Jacob	Alexander	William	Gabriel	Jackson	Michael	Logan	Daniel
Kentucky	William	Jacob	James	Ethan	Landon	Brayden	Logan	Aiden	Michael	Noah
Louisiana	Ethan	Christopher	Jacob	Jayden	Michael	William	Landon	Joshua	Christian	Noah
Maine	Jacob	Benjamin	Noah	Ethan	Caleb	Gavin	Joshua	Aiden	Logan	Jackson
Maryland	Jacob	Michael	Ryan	Joshua	William	Christopher	Ethan	Jayden	Andrew	Anthony
Massachusetts	Ryan	Michael	Jacob	Matthew	William	John	Jack	Nicholas	Joseph	Alexander
Michigan	Jacob	Ethan	Michael	Alexander	Logan	Aiden	Noah	Andrew	Joseph	Joshua
Minnesota	Ethan	Alexander	Logan	William	Jacob	Benjamin	Mason	Noah	Samuel	Gavin
Mississippi	William	James	Christopher	Jayden	John	Joshua	Michael	Ethan	Landon	Jacob
Missouri	Jacob	Ethan	William	Logan	Alexander	Jackson	Chase	Noah	Michael	Andrew
Montana	Ethan	Jacob	William	Wyatt	Gabriel	Logan	Brayden	James	Andrew	Hunter
Nebraska	Jacob	Ethan	Logan	Noah	Samuel	Gavin	Alexander	William	Anthony	Carter
Nevada	Anthony	Daniel	Alexander	Jacob	Michael	Angel	Christopher	Joshua	David	Joseph
New Hampshire	Jacob	Owen	Ethan	Logan	Aiden	William	Ryan	Benjamin	Gavin	Jack
New Jersey	Michael	Matthew	Anthony	Christopher	Daniel	Ryan	Joseph	Alexander	Nicholas	Jayden
New Mexico	Isaiah	Daniel	Elijah	Jacob	Joshua	Michael	Noah	Jose	Christopher	Ethan
New York	Michael	Matthew	Anthony	Daniel	Ryan	Joseph	Jayden	Christopher	Jacob	Alexander
North Carolina	William	Joshua	Jacob	Christopher	Ethan	Michael	James	Jayden	Noah	David
North Dakota	Carter	Aiden	Mason	Gavin	Wyatt	Logan	Brody	Landon	Brayden	Ethan
Ohio	Jacob	Ethan	Michael	Logan	Andrew	William	Noah	Aiden	Joseph	Alexander
Oklahoma	Ethan	Jacob	Logan	Michael	William	Aiden	Alexander	James	Noah	Joshua
Oregon	Ethan	Alexander	Jacob	Logan	Aiden	Benjamin	Noah	Wyatt	Andrew	Daniel
Pennsylvania	Michael	Ryan	Jacob	Matthew	Joseph	Logan	Anthony	Ethan	Alexander	Nicholas
Puerto Rico	Luis	Jose	Angel	Carlos	Diego	Sebastian	Gabriel	Kevin	Juan	Adrian
Rhode Island	Michael	Jayden	Jacob	Ethan	Anthony	Ryan	Matthew	Noah	Andrew	Jack
South Carolina	William	Joshua	Christopher	Jayden	Jacob	James	Michael	Ethan	John	Noah
South Dakota	Jacob	Mason	Noah	Jackson	Ethan	Logan	Isaac	Carter	Samuel	Gavin
Tennessee	William	Jacob	James	Ethan	Elijah	Joshua	Jackson	Christopher	Noah	Michael
Texas	Jose	Jacob	Daniel	Christopher	Joshua	David	Angel	Ethan	Juan	Michael
Utah	Ethan	Samuel	William	Jacob	Benjamin	Joshua	Alexander	Andrew	Daniel	Jackson
Vermont	Noah	Jacob	Benjamin	Logan	Mason	Wyatt	Owen	Ryan	Ethan	Evan
Virginia	William	Jacob	Ethan	Joshua	Michael	Christopher	James	Matthew	Jayden	Alexander
Washington	Ethan	Jacob	Alexander	Daniel	Logan	William	Noah	Aiden	Samuel	Joshua
West Virginia	Jacob	Ethan	Hunter	Landon	Noah	Aiden	James	Brayden	Joshua	Logan
Wisconsin	Ethan	Mason	Jacob	Logan	Benjamin	Alexander	Aiden	Gavin	Noah	William
Wyoming	James	Wyatt	Hunter	Jacob	Tyler	Gabriel	Anthony	Joseph	Noah	Christopher

Female names
Region	No. 1	No. 2	No. 3	No. 4	No. 5	No. 6	No. 7	No. 8	No. 9	No. 10
Alabama	Emma	Madison	Addison	Ava	Emily	Chloe	Anna	Hannah	Isabella	Elizabeth
Alaska	Emma	Ava	Abigail	Sophia	Emily	Isabella	Olivia	Elizabeth	Madison	Alyssa
Arizona	Isabella	Sophia	Emma	Emily	Mia	Abigail	Ava	Samantha	Madison	Elizabeth
Arkansas	Madison	Emma	Addison	Emily	Olivia	Chloe	Ava	Abigail	Isabella	Brooklyn
California	Isabella	Emily	Sophia	Samantha	Ashley	Natalie	Mia	Emma	Abigail	Ava
Colorado	Isabella	Olivia	Sophia	Emma	Abigail	Madison	Ava	Elizabeth	Samantha	Emily
Connecticut	Isabella	Olivia	Ava	Emily	Emma	Madison	Sophia	Abigail	Julia	Grace
Delaware	Ava	Olivia	Madison	Abigail	Emma	Isabella	Emily	Sophia	Alexis	Brianna
District of Columbia	Ashley	Chloe	Sophia	Katherine	Emma	Emily	Madison	Olivia	Abigail	Elizabeth
Florida	Isabella	Sophia	Emily	Emma	Madison	Olivia	Ava	Abigail	Mia	Brianna
Georgia	Madison	Emma	Emily	Ava	Olivia	Abigail	Addison	Elizabeth	Isabella	Chloe
Hawaii	Chloe	Isabella	Madison	Mia	Sophia	Ava	Lily	Hailey	Emma	Kayla
Idaho	Olivia	Emma	Madison	Abigail	Emily	Elizabeth	Sophia	Ava	Alexis	Addison
Illinois	Olivia	Emily	Isabella	Emma	Sophia	Ava	Abigail	Madison	Mia	Samantha
Indiana	Emma	Olivia	Ava	Madison	Addison	Abigail	Emily	Sophia	Isabella	Lillian
Iowa	Emma	Olivia	Ava	Addison	Abigail	Ella	Emily	Grace	Madison	Isabella
Kansas	Emma	Olivia	Emily	Ava	Madison	Addison	Isabella	Elizabeth	Abigail	Chloe
Kentucky	Madison	Emma	Olivia	Abigail	Addison	Emily	Isabella	Ava	Chloe	Elizabeth
Louisiana	Madison	Ava	Emma	Olivia	Isabella	Addison	Chloe	Emily	Abigail	Alyssa
Maine	Emma	Olivia	Madison	Ava	Abigail	Isabella	Emily	Grace	Sophia	Elizabeth
Maryland	Madison	Emily	Emma	Olivia	Ava	Sophia	Isabella	Abigail	Taylor	Chloe
Massachusetts	Ava	Isabella	Olivia	Emma	Sophia	Abigail	Emily	Madison	Grace	Ella
Michigan	Olivia	Ava	Emma	Madison	Isabella	Sophia	Abigail	Addison	Emily	Alexis
Minnesota	Ava	Olivia	Emma	Sophia	Grace	Isabella	Abigail	Ella	Madison	Addison
Mississippi	Madison	Emma	Addison	Ava	Anna	Olivia	Chloe	Makayla	Taylor	Elizabeth
Missouri	Emma	Ava	Madison	Olivia	Chloe	Abigail	Sophia	Isabella	Addison	Emily
Montana	Madison	Olivia	Emma	Isabella	Chloe	Sophia	Grace	Abigail	Elizabeth	Ava
Nebraska	Ava	Addison	Emma	Olivia	Sophia	Ella	Alexis	Grace	Isabella	Madison
Nevada	Emily	Isabella	Olivia	Madison	Sophia	Natalie	Samantha	Abigail	Mia	Ava
New Hampshire	Emma	Olivia	Ava	Madison	Abigail	Sophia	Isabella	Addison	Hannah	Ella
New Jersey	Isabella	Ava	Sophia	Olivia	Emma	Emily	Madison	Samantha	Sarah	Ashley
New Mexico	Isabella	Alyssa	Nevaeh	Madison	Olivia	Alexis	Mia	Sophia	Ava	Emily
New York	Isabella	Olivia	Sophia	Madison	Ava	Emma	Emily	Abigail	Sarah	Samantha
North Carolina	Emma	Madison	Ava	Emily	Abigail	Olivia	Addison	Elizabeth	Isabella	Hannah
North Dakota	Ava	Emma	Sophia	Addison	Ella	Olivia	Abigail	Chloe	Grace	Lily
Ohio	Ava	Olivia	Emma	Madison	Isabella	Abigail	Sophia	Addison	Emily	Chloe
Oklahoma	Emma	Madison	Addison	Emily	Ava	Olivia	Chloe	Abigail	Isabella	Avery
Oregon	Olivia	Emma	Ava	Isabella	Emily	Abigail	Sophia	Madison	Elizabeth	Ella
Pennsylvania	Ava	Olivia	Emma	Madison	Isabella	Abigail	Emily	Sophia	Chloe	Elizabeth
Puerto Rico	Paola	Genesis	Gabriela	Nicole	Alondra	—N/a	—N/a	—N/a	—N/a	—N/a
Rhode Island	Ava	Emma	Olivia	Sophia	Isabella	Madison	Abigail	Grace	Mia	Elizabeth
South Carolina	Madison	Emma	Emily	Abigail	Olivia	Isabella	Ava	Elizabeth	Anna	Addison
South Dakota	Emma	Olivia	Addison	Grace	Ava	Alexis	Ella	Isabella	Elizabeth	Madison
Tennessee	Emma	Madison	Abigail	Addison	Emily	Ava	Chloe	Olivia	Isabella	Elizabeth
Texas	Emily	Isabella	Abigail	Emma	Madison	Sophia	Mia	Natalie	Ashley	Ava
Utah	Olivia	Emma	Abigail	Lily	Elizabeth	Ava	Madison	Addison	Emily	Isabella
Vermont	Emma	Elizabeth	Ava	Olivia	Emily	Abigail	Lily	Hannah	Isabella	Madison
Virginia	Emma	Abigail	Madison	Emily	Olivia	Isabella	Sophia	Ava	Elizabeth	Chloe
Washington	Olivia	Emma	Ava	Sophia	Emily	Isabella	Abigail	Madison	Chloe	Elizabeth
West Virginia	Emma	Madison	Abigail	Olivia	Emily	Ava	Chloe	Alexis	Addison	Isabella
Wisconsin	Ava	Emma	Olivia	Sophia	Isabella	Ella	Emily	Abigail	Addison	Grace
Wyoming	Madison	Emma	Taylor	Abigail	Emily	Ava	Ella	Alexis	Addison	Hannah

== 2009 ==
Male names
Region	No. 1	No. 2	No. 3	No. 4	No. 5	No. 6	No. 7	No. 8	No. 9	No. 10
Alabama	William	James	Jacob	Jackson	John	Joshua	Jayden	Christopher	Michael	Ethan
Alaska	Michael	Ethan	Logan	Samuel	Elijah	James	Joseph	William	David	Gabriel
Arizona	Jacob	Alexander	Daniel	Angel	Anthony	Ethan	David	Michael	Aiden	Jose
Arkansas	William	Jacob	Ethan	Joshua	Jayden	Noah	Christopher	Jackson	Landon	Aiden
California	Daniel	Anthony	Angel	Jacob	Alexander	Ethan	David	Andrew	Matthew	Joshua
Colorado	Alexander	Jacob	Noah	William	Benjamin	Ethan	Logan	Daniel	David	Jackson
Connecticut	Michael	Ryan	Alexander	Matthew	Jayden	Ethan	William	Anthony	Joshua	Christopher
Delaware	Alexander	Michael	James	Jayden	Ethan	Matthew	William	Logan	Aiden	Chase
District of Columbia	William	Michael	James	Alexander	Daniel	Christopher	John	Joshua	Elijah	Jacob
Florida	Jayden	Michael	Joshua	Jacob	Anthony	Christopher	Ethan	Daniel	Alexander	Noah
Georgia	William	Christopher	Joshua	James	Jayden	Jacob	Michael	Christian	Ethan	Noah
Hawaii	Ethan	Noah	Jayden	Joshua	Elijah	Caleb	Jacob	Aiden	Gabriel	Isaiah
Idaho	Logan	Jacob	Ethan	William	Wyatt	Jackson	Noah	Aiden	Mason	Alexander
Illinois	Alexander	Daniel	Jacob	Michael	Anthony	Ethan	Joshua	William	Nathan	Aiden
Indiana	Ethan	Noah	Jacob	Logan	Elijah	Aiden	Alexander	William	Jackson	Gavin
Iowa	Jacob	Ethan	Carter	Noah	William	Owen	Jackson	Gavin	Logan	Mason
Kansas	Ethan	William	Jacob	Alexander	Noah	Aiden	Jackson	Gabriel	Logan	Joshua
Kentucky	Jacob	William	James	Ethan	Noah	Landon	Aiden	Brayden	Elijah	Jackson
Louisiana	Jayden	Ethan	Landon	Joshua	Noah	William	Michael	Aiden	John	Christopher
Maine	Noah	Logan	Jacob	Owen	Aiden	Landon	William	Michael	Carter	Wyatt
Maryland	Michael	Jayden	Joshua	Ethan	William	Alexander	Jacob	Matthew	Noah	Ryan
Massachusetts	Ryan	Jacob	William	Michael	Matthew	Benjamin	John	Anthony	Alexander	Jack
Michigan	Jacob	Ethan	Logan	Noah	Aiden	Michael	Alexander	Joshua	Andrew	William
Minnesota	Logan	Benjamin	William	Ethan	Jacob	Alexander	Owen	Carter	Samuel	Noah
Mississippi	William	Jayden	James	Christopher	Joshua	John	Michael	Ethan	Landon	Jacob
Missouri	Jacob	Ethan	William	Jackson	Logan	Aiden	Noah	Michael	Landon	Gavin
Montana	Ethan	Wyatt	Logan	Landon	James	William	Jacob	Liam	Benjamin	Isaac
Nebraska	Alexander	Carter	Noah	William	Jacob	Ethan	Logan	Samuel	Landon	Gavin
Nevada	Anthony	Jacob	Daniel	Michael	Alexander	Ethan	Jayden	Angel	David	Aiden
New Hampshire	Logan	Jacob	Liam	Aiden	Ryan	Ethan	Matthew	Benjamin	Gavin	William
New Jersey	Michael	Matthew	Anthony	Jayden	Ryan	Daniel	Joseph	Christopher	Alexander	Nicholas
New Mexico	Aiden	Noah	Joshua	Jacob	Gabriel	Michael	Isaiah	Daniel	Elijah	Josiah
New York	Michael	Jayden	Matthew	Ethan	Daniel	Ryan	Anthony	Joseph	Jacob	Christopher
North Carolina	William	Jacob	Christopher	Noah	Joshua	Ethan	Michael	Alexander	Elijah	James
North Dakota	Ethan	Logan	Jack	Carter	Jacob	Mason	Brayden	Gavin	Aiden	Jackson
Ohio	Jacob	Noah	Ethan	Logan	William	Aiden	Michael	Andrew	Alexander	James
Oklahoma	Ethan	Jacob	Noah	William	Joshua	Aiden	James	Michael	Gabriel	Logan
Oregon	Alexander	Logan	Jacob	Daniel	Ethan	Gabriel	Noah	Elijah	William	Benjamin
Pennsylvania	Michael	Jacob	Ethan	Logan	Matthew	Ryan	Alexander	Chase	Joseph	Aiden
Puerto Rico	Luis	Angel	Adrian	Jose	Diego	Sebastian	Carlos	Ian	Gabriel	Yadiel
Rhode Island	Anthony	Jayden	Logan	Jacob	Michael	Aiden	Joseph	Joshua	Matthew	Benjamin
South Carolina	William	Jayden	Christopher	James	Jacob	Joshua	Michael	Jackson	Noah	Caleb
South Dakota	Ethan	Noah	Gavin	Logan	Jackson	Aiden	Jacob	Mason	Wyatt	Carter
Tennessee	William	Jacob	Joshua	Noah	Ethan	James	Elijah	Jackson	Michael	Aiden
Texas	Jose	Daniel	Jacob	Angel	Christopher	David	Ethan	Joshua	Jayden	Alexander
Utah	Ethan	William	Jacob	Isaac	James	Mason	Benjamin	Samuel	Joshua	Logan
Vermont	Noah	William	Owen	Logan	Aiden	Hunter	Jackson	Jacob	Carter	Wyatt
Virginia	William	Jacob	Michael	Noah	Ethan	Christopher	Joshua	Alexander	James	Jayden
Washington	Alexander	Jacob	Ethan	William	Daniel	Logan	Benjamin	Aiden	Samuel	David
West Virginia	Jacob	Hunter	Ethan	Noah	Aiden	Brayden	Logan	Landon	Elijah	James
Wisconsin	Ethan	Jacob	Noah	Logan	Mason	Alexander	Aiden	Owen	Carter	Jackson
Wyoming	Wyatt	William	Aiden	Jacob	Mason	Noah	Hunter	Logan	James	Brayden

Female names
Region	No. 1	No. 2	No. 3	No. 4	No. 5	No. 6	No. 7	No. 8	No. 9	No. 10
Alabama	Emma	Madison	Isabella	Ava	Anna	Addison	Olivia	Chloe	Abigail	Emily
Alaska	Isabella	Sophia	Olivia	Abigail	Ava	Emma	Madison	Chloe	Emily	Elizabeth
Arizona	Isabella	Sophia	Emma	Mia	Emily	Olivia	Madison	Abigail	Ava	Samantha
Arkansas	Emma	Madison	Addison	Isabella	Ava	Alexis	Emily	Abigail	Olivia	Chloe
California	Isabella	Sophia	Emily	Mia	Samantha	Natalie	Emma	Ashley	Abigail	Olivia
Colorado	Isabella	Olivia	Sophia	Abigail	Emma	Ava	Emily	Addison	Elizabeth	Madison
Connecticut	Isabella	Olivia	Sophia	Ava	Emma	Madison	Abigail	Mia	Samantha	Emily
Delaware	Isabella	Olivia	Sophia	Abigail	Ava	Emma	Madison	Samantha	Emily	Elizabeth
District of Columbia	Allison	Sophia	Ashley	Katherine	Abigail	Elizabeth	Taylor	Charlotte	Zoe	Anna
Florida	Isabella	Sophia	Emma	Emily	Olivia	Madison	Ava	Mia	Abigail	Chloe
Georgia	Madison	Isabella	Emma	Olivia	Ava	Abigail	Emily	Chloe	Elizabeth	Addison
Hawaii	Isabella	Sophia	Mia	Ava	Chloe	Madison	Olivia	Taylor	Emma	Faith
Idaho	Olivia	Emma	Isabella	Sophia	Addison	Abigail	Elizabeth	Emily	Ava	Madison
Illinois	Isabella	Olivia	Sophia	Emma	Emily	Ava	Abigail	Mia	Madison	Ella
Indiana	Emma	Olivia	Isabella	Ava	Addison	Sophia	Abigail	Madison	Chloe	Lillian
Iowa	Ava	Olivia	Emma	Isabella	Addison	Ella	Sophia	Chloe	Grace	Natalie
Kansas	Emma	Isabella	Ava	Olivia	Abigail	Addison	Madison	Sophia	Chloe	Emily
Kentucky	Emma	Isabella	Madison	Olivia	Abigail	Alexis	Addison	Ava	Chloe	Emily
Louisiana	Ava	Emma	Isabella	Madison	Olivia	Chloe	Addison	Abigail	Emily	Sophia
Maine	Emma	Olivia	Isabella	Abigail	Madison	Ava	Lily	Chloe	Sophia	Addison
Maryland	Madison	Olivia	Ava	Isabella	Emma	Sophia	Abigail	Chloe	Emily	Taylor
Massachusetts	Olivia	Isabella	Sophia	Ava	Emma	Abigail	Emily	Grace	Madison	Mia
Michigan	Olivia	Isabella	Ava	Emma	Madison	Sophia	Abigail	Chloe	Addison	Ella
Minnesota	Olivia	Ava	Emma	Sophia	Isabella	Ella	Grace	Abigail	Addison	Chloe
Mississippi	Madison	Emma	Addison	Ava	Anna	Isabella	Chloe	Olivia	Makayla	Alyssa
Missouri	Emma	Olivia	Isabella	Ava	Madison	Sophia	Abigail	Chloe	Addison	Elizabeth
Montana	Emma	Isabella	Olivia	Ava	Madison	Sophia	Hailey	Addison	Taylor	Chloe
Nebraska	Addison	Isabella	Ava	Olivia	Emma	Sophia	Ella	Emily	Grace	Alexis
Nevada	Isabella	Sophia	Emma	Olivia	Emily	Ava	Madison	Mia	Abigail	Samantha
New Hampshire	Olivia	Isabella	Ava	Emma	Abigail	Alexis	Madison	Sophia	Lily	Emily
New Jersey	Isabella	Olivia	Sophia	Ava	Emily	Mia	Emma	Madison	Samantha	Abigail
New Mexico	Isabella	Olivia	Mia	Nevaeh	Sophia	Ava	Emily	Alyssa	Madison	Emma
New York	Isabella	Sophia	Olivia	Emma	Emily	Madison	Ava	Mia	Abigail	Sarah
North Carolina	Emma	Madison	Isabella	Ava	Abigail	Olivia	Emily	Addison	Chloe	Sophia
North Dakota	Olivia	Ava	Emma	Ella	Isabella	Chloe	Taylor	Abigail	Lily	Addison
Ohio	Isabella	Emma	Olivia	Ava	Madison	Sophia	Addison	Abigail	Chloe	Ella
Oklahoma	Isabella	Emma	Addison	Madison	Abigail	Chloe	Olivia	Emily	Ava	Alexis
Oregon	Emma	Isabella	Olivia	Emily	Sophia	Madison	Abigail	Ava	Elizabeth	Chloe
Pennsylvania	Isabella	Olivia	Ava	Emma	Sophia	Madison	Emily	Abigail	Ella	Grace
Puerto Rico	Alondra	Mia	Valeria	Kamila	Camila	Amanda	Andrea	Gabriela	Adriana	Alanis
Rhode Island	Isabella	Olivia	Sophia	Ava	Emma	Abigail	Madison	Mia	Emily	Gabriella
South Carolina	Emma	Madison	Isabella	Olivia	Abigail	Ava	Elizabeth	Addison	Emily	Chloe
South Dakota	Emma	Ava	Isabella	Sophia	Alexis	Elizabeth	Addison	Olivia	Madison	Brooklyn
Tennessee	Emma	Madison	Isabella	Olivia	Abigail	Addison	Ava	Chloe	Emily	Elizabeth
Texas	Isabella	Emily	Mia	Emma	Sophia	Abigail	Madison	Ava	Natalie	Olivia
Utah	Olivia	Emma	Abigail	Brooklyn	Lily	Isabella	Elizabeth	Ava	Sophia	Chloe
Vermont	Emma	Ava	Isabella	Madison	Sophia	Olivia	Abigail	Lily	Addison	Grace
Virginia	Isabella	Madison	Emma	Olivia	Abigail	Sophia	Ava	Emily	Elizabeth	Chloe
Washington	Isabella	Olivia	Sophia	Emma	Abigail	Emily	Ava	Elizabeth	Chloe	Madison
West Virginia	Madison	Isabella	Emma	Alexis	Emily	Olivia	Abigail	Chloe	Ava	Kaylee
Wisconsin	Olivia	Isabella	Emma	Ava	Sophia	Addison	Ella	Abigail	Elizabeth	Grace
Wyoming	Isabella	Madison	Ava	Emma	Alexis	Elizabeth	Addison	Olivia	Abigail	Taylor

== 2010 ==
Male names
Region	No. 1	No. 2	No. 3	No. 4	No. 5	No. 6	No. 7	No. 8	No. 9	No. 10
Alaska	William	James	Logan	Michael	Jacob	Ethan	Alexander	Elijah	Joshua	Liam
Alabama	William	James	John	Jacob	Jayden	Jackson	Noah	Elijah	Christopher	Ethan
Arizona	Jacob	Daniel	Anthony	Alexander	Angel	Michael	Jayden	Gabriel	Ethan	Aiden
Arkansas	William	Jacob	Elijah	James	Ethan	Jayden	Michael	Mason	Landon	Aiden
California	Jacob	Daniel	Anthony	Alexander	Angel	Ethan	Jayden	David	Andrew	Nathan
Colorado	Jacob	Alexander	Noah	William	Daniel	Liam	Elijah	Logan	Anthony	Gabriel
Connecticut	Michael	Alexander	Jacob	Matthew	Ryan	Jayden	William	Noah	Christopher	Ethan
Delaware	Michael	William	Alexander	James	Anthony	Mason	Jacob	Joshua	Gavin	Logan
District of Columbia	William	Alexander	Henry	John	Christopher	James	Anthony	Michael	Noah	Benjamin
Florida	Jayden	Jacob	Michael	Anthony	Alexander	Ethan	Joshua	Daniel	Matthew	Gabriel
Georgia	William	Jacob	Jayden	Joshua	Elijah	Christopher	James	Ethan	Michael	Jackson
Hawaii	Noah	Jacob	Elijah	Joshua	Ethan	Aiden	Logan	Caleb	Dylan	Gabriel
Idaho	William	Samuel	Logan	Ethan	Jacob	Aiden	Mason	Alexander	James	Noah
Illinois	Alexander	Jacob	Michael	Daniel	Anthony	Ethan	Jayden	William	Joshua	Logan
Indiana	Elijah	Jacob	Ethan	Mason	Noah	Aiden	Andrew	Logan	Alexander	Landon
Iowa	Noah	Mason	Ethan	Aiden	Jacob	Landon	William	Jackson	Carter	Logan
Kansas	Jacob	William	Alexander	Ethan	Elijah	Gabriel	Mason	Noah	Landon	Jackson
Kentucky	William	Jacob	Brayden	Noah	James	Mason	Landon	Jackson	Ethan	Aiden
Louisiana	Jayden	Ethan	Mason	Noah	Michael	Aiden	Landon	Joshua	Jacob	Brayden
Maine	Owen	Aiden	Liam	Noah	Logan	Mason	Wyatt	Jacob	Ethan	Hunter
Maryland	Jacob	Joshua	Michael	Noah	Ethan	Mason	Ryan	Daniel	Alexander	Jayden
Massachusetts	Ryan	Benjamin	William	Jacob	Michael	Matthew	James	Alexander	Andrew	Anthony
Michigan	Jacob	Ethan	Noah	Logan	Aiden	Michael	Alexander	Mason	Andrew	William
Minnesota	Mason	Ethan	William	Owen	Logan	Jack	Samuel	Jacob	Jackson	Carter
Mississippi	William	James	Jayden	John	Elijah	Jacob	Christopher	Aiden	Michael	Joshua
Missouri	Jacob	Mason	William	Logan	Jackson	Elijah	Michael	Noah	Landon	Ethan
Montana	Wyatt	Samuel	Ethan	Jacob	Logan	Mason	Noah	James	William	Caleb
Nebraska	Jacob	Mason	Noah	William	Jackson	Owen	Carter	Alexander	Elijah	Ethan
Nevada	Jacob	Jayden	Anthony	Daniel	Alexander	David	Logan	Michael	Angel	Aiden
New Hampshire	Logan	Mason	Owen	Jacob	Liam	Benjamin	William	Ethan	Michael	Tyler
New Jersey	Michael	Ryan	Jayden	Anthony	Joseph	Daniel	Matthew	Jacob	Christopher	Nicholas
New Mexico	Elijah	Jacob	Aiden	Michael	Noah	Joshua	Gabriel	Daniel	Anthony	Jayden
New York	Michael	Jayden	Jacob	Ethan	Daniel	Joseph	Anthony	Matthew	Ryan	Alexander
North Carolina	William	Jacob	Elijah	Noah	Jayden	Joshua	Ethan	James	Alexander	Jackson
North Dakota	Mason	Jacob	Logan	Noah	Aiden	Ethan	Liam	Carter	Bentley	Brayden
Ohio	Jacob	Mason	Logan	Noah	Ethan	Aiden	William	Michael	Carter	Landon
Oklahoma	Jacob	Aiden	Elijah	Ethan	Noah	Mason	William	James	Logan	Michael
Oregon	Jacob	Logan	Benjamin	Noah	Mason	Samuel	Ethan	Alexander	William	Wyatt
Pennsylvania	Michael	Jacob	Mason	Logan	Ryan	Ethan	Aiden	Anthony	Joseph	Noah
Rhode Island	Logan	Michael	Alexander	Jayden	Jacob	Benjamin	Mason	Daniel	Ethan	Joseph
South Carolina	William	James	Jacob	Jayden	Michael	Christopher	Joshua	Elijah	John	Noah
South Dakota	Jacob	Mason	Noah	Carter	Landon	Aiden	Benjamin	Gavin	Owen	Ethan
Tennessee	William	Jacob	Elijah	James	Noah	Ethan	Jackson	Aiden	Joshua	Christopher
Texas	Jacob	Jose	Jayden	Angel	David	Daniel	Christopher	Ethan	Anthony	Joshua
Utah	William	Mason	Ethan	Jacob	James	Samuel	Isaac	Logan	Jack	Benjamin
Vermont	Logan	Wyatt	William	Connor	Liam	Mason	Carter	Noah	Owen	Aiden
Virginia	William	Jacob	Michael	Alexander	Ethan	Noah	James	Joshua	Christopher	Aiden
Washington	Jacob	Alexander	Ethan	Daniel	William	Logan	Benjamin	Noah	Liam	Elijah
West Virginia	Jacob	Mason	Noah	Logan	Landon	Brayden	Aiden	James	Hunter	Ethan
Wisconsin	Mason	Ethan	Jacob	Logan	Noah	Jackson	Carter	Owen	Alexander	William
Wyoming	James	Logan	Wyatt	Gabriel	Samuel	Ethan	Mason	Noah	Austin	Carter

Female names
Region	No. 1	No. 2	No. 3	No. 4	No. 5	No. 6	No. 7	No. 8	No. 9	No. 10
Alaska	Sophia	Emma	Isabella	Olivia	Ava	Abigail	Elizabeth	Grace	Madison	Chloe
Alabama	Emma	Isabella	Madison	Ava	Olivia	Chloe	Abigail	Elizabeth	Addison	Emily
Arizona	Isabella	Sophia	Mia	Emma	Olivia	Emily	Abigail	Ava	Madison	Natalie
Arkansas	Emma	Isabella	Addison	Chloe	Madison	Emily	Abigail	Olivia	Ava	Sophia
California	Isabella	Sophia	Emily	Mia	Emma	Samantha	Olivia	Abigail	Natalie	Ava
Colorado	Isabella	Sophia	Olivia	Emma	Abigail	Ava	Emily	Elizabeth	Madison	Ella
Connecticut	Isabella	Olivia	Sophia	Ava	Emma	Abigail	Madison	Mia	Gabriella	Emily
Delaware	Sophia	Isabella	Ava	Olivia	Emily	Madison	Abigail	Emma	Leah	Mia
District of Columbia	Madison	Olivia	Charlotte	Ashley	Sophia	Ava	Emma	Zoe	Abigail	Elizabeth
Florida	Isabella	Sophia	Olivia	Emma	Emily	Mia	Ava	Madison	Abigail	Chloe
Georgia	Isabella	Emma	Madison	Abigail	Olivia	Sophia	Chloe	Emily	Ava	Addison
Hawaii	Isabella	Sophia	Chloe	Ava	Emma	Olivia	Mia	Hailey	Madison	Lily
Idaho	Olivia	Emma	Sophia	Ava	Abigail	Elizabeth	Isabella	Emily	Ella	Addison
Illinois	Isabella	Sophia	Olivia	Emma	Emily	Abigail	Ava	Mia	Madison	Grace
Indiana	Emma	Sophia	Isabella	Olivia	Ava	Addison	Abigail	Chloe	Ella	Emily
Iowa	Ava	Emma	Sophia	Olivia	Isabella	Addison	Ella	Abigail	Chloe	Elizabeth
Kansas	Isabella	Ava	Sophia	Emma	Olivia	Addison	Abigail	Avery	Emily	Chloe
Kentucky	Isabella	Emma	Abigail	Addison	Madison	Olivia	Sophia	Chloe	Ava	Alexis
Louisiana	Ava	Emma	Isabella	Madison	Olivia	Chloe	Sophia	Addison	Khloe	Abigail
Maine	Emma	Olivia	Isabella	Madison	Sophia	Ava	Ella	Abigail	Grace	Addison
Maryland	Sophia	Madison	Olivia	Isabella	Abigail	Ava	Emma	Chloe	Emily	Elizabeth
Massachusetts	Isabella	Sophia	Olivia	Ava	Emma	Abigail	Emily	Ella	Mia	Madison
Michigan	Sophia	Isabella	Olivia	Ava	Emma	Madison	Addison	Abigail	Ella	Chloe
Minnesota	Ava	Olivia	Sophia	Isabella	Emma	Abigail	Ella	Addison	Grace	Emily
Mississippi	Madison	Emma	Addison	Isabella	Ava	Chloe	Olivia	Elizabeth	Anna	Khloe
Missouri	Isabella	Emma	Olivia	Sophia	Ava	Abigail	Addison	Madison	Chloe	Emily
Montana	Emma	Isabella	Sophia	Olivia	Ella	Abigail	Madison	Addison	Ava	Elizabeth
Nebraska	Olivia	Isabella	Ava	Sophia	Emma	Addison	Ella	Chloe	Elizabeth	Emily
Nevada	Isabella	Sophia	Emily	Emma	Mia	Olivia	Madison	Ava	Samantha	Abigail
New Hampshire	Sophia	Olivia	Isabella	Ava	Emma	Abigail	Madison	Ella	Addison	Elizabeth
New Jersey	Isabella	Sophia	Olivia	Ava	Emily	Emma	Mia	Abigail	Madison	Samantha
New Mexico	Isabella	Sophia	Nevaeh	Mia	Olivia	Emma	Abigail	Aaliyah	Emily	Hailey
New York	Isabella	Sophia	Olivia	Emma	Ava	Madison	Emily	Mia	Abigail	Chloe
North Carolina	Emma	Isabella	Ava	Madison	Sophia	Abigail	Olivia	Addison	Chloe	Emily
North Dakota	Sophia	Isabella	Addison	Ella	Olivia	Brooklyn	Emma	Emily	Elizabeth	Ava
Ohio	Isabella	Ava	Olivia	Emma	Sophia	Addison	Madison	Abigail	Ella	Lillian
Oklahoma	Isabella	Emma	Olivia	Addison	Madison	Abigail	Sophia	Chloe	Ava	Alexis
Oregon	Sophia	Olivia	Emma	Isabella	Emily	Abigail	Ava	Ella	Madison	Addison
Pennsylvania	Isabella	Sophia	Emma	Olivia	Ava	Abigail	Madison	Emily	Ella	Chloe
Rhode Island	Isabella	Sophia	Olivia	Ava	Emma	Abigail	Emily	Ella	Gabriella	Elizabeth
South Carolina	Madison	Isabella	Emma	Olivia	Ava	Abigail	Sophia	Emily	Elizabeth	Addison
South Dakota	Sophia	Ava	Emma	Olivia	Isabella	Brooklyn	Ella	Avery	Alexis	Chloe
Tennessee	Isabella	Emma	Madison	Addison	Abigail	Ava	Olivia	Chloe	Sophia	Elizabeth
Texas	Isabella	Sophia	Emma	Emily	Mia	Abigail	Ava	Olivia	Madison	Natalie
Utah	Olivia	Abigail	Sophia	Emma	Lily	Brooklyn	Chloe	Elizabeth	Ava	Addison
Vermont	Sophia	Ava	Olivia	Emma	Isabella	Addison	Madison	Abigail	Elizabeth	Emily
Virginia	Olivia	Sophia	Isabella	Emma	Abigail	Madison	Ava	Chloe	Emily	Elizabeth
Washington	Sophia	Olivia	Isabella	Emma	Abigail	Emily	Ava	Elizabeth	Chloe	Madison
West Virginia	Isabella	Emma	Madison	Abigail	Alexis	Sophia	Addison	Olivia	Chloe	Ava
Wisconsin	Sophia	Olivia	Ava	Isabella	Emma	Ella	Addison	Abigail	Emily	Grace
Wyoming	Isabella	Madison	Sophia	Addison	Chloe	Emma	Lillian	Abigail	Brooklyn	Alexis

== 2011 ==
Male names
Region	No. 1	No. 2	No. 3	No. 4	No. 5	No. 6	No. 7	No. 8	No. 9	No. 10
Alaska	Mason	James	William	Liam	Ethan	Logan	Wyatt	Daniel	Michael	Elijah
Alabama	William	Mason	James	Jacob	John	Noah	Jayden	Elijah	Jackson	Aiden
Arizona	Jacob	Anthony	Daniel	Michael	Ethan	Angel	Alexander	Mason	Noah	Aiden
Arkansas	William	Jacob	Mason	Aiden	Noah	Jayden	Elijah	Ethan	Joshua	Jackson
California	Jacob	Daniel	Jayden	Anthony	Matthew	Alexander	Ethan	David	Andrew	Nathan
Colorado	Liam	Mason	Noah	Elijah	William	Alexander	Jacob	Logan	Daniel	Benjamin
Connecticut	Alexander	Michael	Mason	Ryan	Jacob	William	Joseph	Anthony	Matthew	Jayden
Delaware	Michael	Mason	Ryan	William	Noah	Ethan	Jacob	Anthony	Aiden	Jayden
District of Columbia	William	Alexander	Daniel	James	Christopher	Benjamin	Henry	John	Jayden	Joshua
Florida	Jayden	Jacob	Daniel	Noah	Michael	Anthony	Joshua	Elijah	Alexander	Mason
Georgia	William	Christopher	Mason	Joshua	Jayden	Jacob	Michael	Elijah	James	Aiden
Hawaii	Noah	Mason	Elijah	Aiden	Ethan	Jacob	Alexander	Logan	Isaiah	Liam
Idaho	Mason	Jacob	Liam	Benjamin	Alexander	William	Wyatt	Ethan	Samuel	Aiden
Illinois	Alexander	Michael	Jacob	Noah	Daniel	Mason	Ethan	William	Anthony	Benjamin
Indiana	Mason	Liam	Elijah	Noah	William	Jackson	Jacob	Ethan	Alexander	Aiden
Iowa	Carter	Mason	Owen	Noah	Jacob	William	Jackson	Ethan	Liam	Logan
Kansas	Mason	William	Jacob	Ethan	Jackson	Aiden	Logan	Samuel	Noah	Alexander
Kentucky	William	Mason	Elijah	Jacob	Brayden	Noah	Aiden	Landon	Jackson	James
Louisiana	Mason	Jayden	Aiden	William	Landon	Ethan	Noah	Michael	John	Elijah
Maine	Mason	Liam	Jacob	Benjamin	Wyatt	William	Noah	Owen	Jackson	Carter
Maryland	Mason	Jacob	Michael	Ethan	Ryan	William	Alexander	Noah	Daniel	Jayden
Massachusetts	William	Benjamin	Jacob	Michael	Ryan	Mason	John	Anthony	Noah	Jack
Michigan	Mason	Jacob	Noah	Logan	Liam	Ethan	Michael	Carter	Alexander	Lucas
Minnesota	Mason	William	Jacob	Liam	Benjamin	Ethan	Logan	Jack	Noah	Jackson
Mississippi	William	James	Jayden	John	Christopher	Elijah	Jacob	Mason	Joshua	Ethan
Missouri	Mason	William	Noah	Jacob	Liam	Jackson	Aiden	Logan	Elijah	Ethan
Montana	Mason	Liam	Wyatt	Jacob	Noah	William	Logan	Ethan	Brayden	Samuel
Nebraska	Mason	Jackson	William	Alexander	Jacob	Carter	Liam	Logan	Noah	Ethan
Nevada	Anthony	Jacob	Daniel	Mason	Jayden	Alexander	Noah	Aiden	Matthew	Michael
New Hampshire	Mason	Logan	Liam	Jackson	Noah	Owen	Benjamin	Jacob	Connor	William
New Jersey	Michael	Ryan	Anthony	Jayden	Jacob	Matthew	Joseph	Daniel	Alexander	Christopher
New Mexico	Jacob	Elijah	Michael	Aiden	Noah	Gabriel	Daniel	Jayden	Joshua	Isaiah
New York	Michael	Jacob	Jayden	Matthew	Joseph	Ethan	Anthony	Mason	Daniel	Ryan
North Carolina	William	Mason	Jacob	Elijah	Noah	Jayden	Jackson	James	Ethan	Christopher
North Dakota	Mason	Carter	Jacob	Liam	Ethan	Logan	Noah	Owen	Easton	Wyatt
Ohio	Mason	Jacob	Noah	William	Liam	Michael	Logan	Ethan	Alexander	Aiden
Oklahoma	William	Mason	Jacob	Noah	Elijah	Ethan	Aiden	Michael	James	Wyatt
Oregon	Mason	Liam	Logan	Jacob	Alexander	Samuel	Daniel	Jackson	Ethan	Noah
Pennsylvania	Mason	Michael	Jacob	Logan	Ryan	Noah	Liam	Ethan	Benjamin	William
Rhode Island	Mason	Michael	Benjamin	William	Jayden	Joseph	Alexander	Ethan	Jacob	Logan
South Carolina	William	Mason	Jayden	James	Aiden	Jacob	Elijah	Jackson	Noah	Christopher
South Dakota	Mason	Carter	William	Logan	Elijah	Jackson	Jacob	Benjamin	Gavin	Noah
Tennessee	William	Mason	Elijah	Jacob	James	Jackson	Noah	Jayden	Aiden	John
Texas	Jacob	Jayden	Daniel	Jose	David	Ethan	Noah	Aiden	Angel	Christopher
Utah	Mason	William	James	Jacob	Samuel	Ethan	Jackson	Isaac	Benjamin	Liam
Vermont	Liam	William	Mason	Carter	Benjamin	Owen	Ethan	Logan	Samuel	James
Virginia	William	Jacob	Mason	Noah	Ethan	James	Michael	Jackson	Jayden	Liam
Washington	Mason	Liam	Alexander	Jacob	Ethan	Noah	Daniel	Logan	William	Benjamin
West Virginia	Mason	Jacob	Landon	Noah	Aiden	Hunter	Elijah	Brayden	Bentley	Gavin
Wisconsin	Mason	Liam	William	Logan	Owen	Noah	Jacob	Jackson	Alexander	Benjamin
Wyoming	William	Jacob	Jackson	Parker	Liam	Mason	Gabriel	James	Logan	Noah

Female names
Region	No. 1	No. 2	No. 3	No. 4	No. 5	No. 6	No. 7	No. 8	No. 9	No. 10
Alaska	Olivia	Emma	Isabella	Madison	Sophia	Ava	Emily	Chloe	Abigail	Amelia
Alabama	Emma	Ava	Madison	Olivia	Isabella	Addison	Chloe	Elizabeth	Abigail	Anna
Arizona	Sophia	Isabella	Emma	Emily	Mia	Olivia	Ava	Abigail	Victoria	Chloe
Arkansas	Emma	Isabella	Addison	Madison	Abigail	Ava	Sophia	Chloe	Emily	Olivia
California	Sophia	Isabella	Emily	Mia	Emma	Olivia	Sofia	Abigail	Samantha	Natalie
Colorado	Olivia	Sophia	Emma	Isabella	Abigail	Ava	Emily	Lily	Elizabeth	Ella
Connecticut	Sophia	Isabella	Olivia	Ava	Emma	Madison	Mia	Emily	Abigail	Gianna
Delaware	Sophia	Olivia	Ava	Emma	Emily	Abigail	Madison	Aubrey	Isabella	Chloe
District of Columbia	Sophia	Ava	Elizabeth	Olivia	Sofia	Katherine	Madison	Maya	Isabella	Abigail
Florida	Isabella	Sophia	Emma	Olivia	Emily	Mia	Ava	Madison	Abigail	Chloe
Georgia	Emma	Isabella	Madison	Olivia	Ava	Abigail	Sophia	Chloe	Emily	Elizabeth
Hawaii	Sophia	Olivia	Chloe	Emma	Isabella	Ava	Mia	Lily	Alexis	Abigail
Idaho	Emma	Sophia	Olivia	Ava	Emily	Abigail	Elizabeth	Addison	Ella	Avery
Illinois	Sophia	Olivia	Isabella	Emma	Emily	Ava	Mia	Abigail	Sofia	Natalie
Indiana	Emma	Olivia	Ava	Sophia	Isabella	Addison	Ella	Abigail	Elizabeth	Emily
Iowa	Emma	Olivia	Sophia	Ava	Addison	Ella	Isabella	Abigail	Natalie	Avery
Kansas	Sophia	Emma	Olivia	Isabella	Ava	Abigail	Brooklyn	Addison	Ella	Chloe
Kentucky	Emma	Isabella	Sophia	Olivia	Addison	Ava	Madison	Chloe	Abigail	Brooklyn
Louisiana	Ava	Emma	Isabella	Sophia	Olivia	Chloe	Madison	Ella	Addison	Aubrey
Maine	Emma	Sophia	Isabella	Olivia	Ava	Grace	Addison	Madison	Abigail	Ella
Maryland	Sophia	Olivia	Isabella	Madison	Ava	Emma	Abigail	Chloe	Emily	Elizabeth
Massachusetts	Sophia	Olivia	Isabella	Emma	Ava	Abigail	Ella	Emily	Mia	Charlotte
Michigan	Olivia	Sophia	Emma	Isabella	Ava	Madison	Abigail	Ella	Brooklyn	Addison
Minnesota	Olivia	Sophia	Emma	Ava	Isabella	Abigail	Grace	Ella	Elizabeth	Chloe
Mississippi	Madison	Emma	Ava	Addison	Olivia	Isabella	Brooklyn	Chloe	Aubrey	Mary
Missouri	Emma	Sophia	Olivia	Ava	Isabella	Addison	Abigail	Chloe	Madison	Lillian
Montana	Emma	Madison	Olivia	Ava	Harper	Sophia	Brooklyn	Grace	Emily	Abigail
Nebraska	Emma	Sophia	Olivia	Ava	Ella	Isabella	Chloe	Madison	Harper	Avery
Nevada	Sophia	Isabella	Olivia	Emily	Emma	Mia	Abigail	Ava	Chloe	Madison
New Hampshire	Sophia	Olivia	Emma	Ava	Isabella	Abigail	Ella	Emily	Charlotte	Madison
New Jersey	Sophia	Isabella	Olivia	Ava	Emily	Emma	Mia	Madison	Abigail	Samantha
New Mexico	Sophia	Isabella	Mia	Nevaeh	Emma	Ava	Emily	Olivia	Madison	Abigail
New York	Sophia	Isabella	Olivia	Emma	Ava	Emily	Mia	Madison	Abigail	Chloe
North Carolina	Emma	Ava	Olivia	Isabella	Sophia	Madison	Abigail	Emily	Chloe	Addison
North Dakota	Emma	Ava	Sophia	Olivia	Harper	Isabella	Abigail	Ella	Avery	Brooklyn
Ohio	Emma	Sophia	Ava	Olivia	Isabella	Madison	Abigail	Addison	Chloe	Lillian
Oklahoma	Emma	Sophia	Isabella	Olivia	Ava	Addison	Emily	Abigail	Brooklyn	Chloe
Oregon	Sophia	Emma	Olivia	Ava	Isabella	Abigail	Emily	Natalie	Elizabeth	Evelyn
Pennsylvania	Sophia	Emma	Ava	Olivia	Isabella	Abigail	Emily	Madison	Ella	Mia
Rhode Island	Sophia	Olivia	Isabella	Emma	Ava	Emily	Mia	Abigail	Lily	Ella
South Carolina	Madison	Emma	Isabella	Olivia	Ava	Abigail	Sophia	Emily	Elizabeth	Addison
South Dakota	Ava	Emma	Olivia	Sophia	Brooklyn	Isabella	Emily	Harper	Addison	Grace
Tennessee	Emma	Isabella	Ava	Olivia	Madison	Addison	Abigail	Chloe	Sophia	Emily
Texas	Sophia	Isabella	Emma	Mia	Emily	Abigail	Olivia	Ava	Camila	Sofia
Utah	Olivia	Sophia	Emma	Lily	Abigail	Brooklyn	Elizabeth	Lucy	Avery	Chloe
Vermont	Emma	Olivia	Sophia	Ava	Isabella	Lillian	Amelia	Madison	Abigail	Grace
Virginia	Sophia	Emma	Olivia	Isabella	Abigail	Madison	Emily	Ava	Elizabeth	Chloe
Washington	Sophia	Olivia	Emma	Isabella	Emily	Ava	Abigail	Chloe	Madison	Elizabeth
West Virginia	Isabella	Emma	Madison	Sophia	Addison	Abigail	Olivia	Ava	Alexis	Chloe
Wisconsin	Sophia	Emma	Ava	Olivia	Isabella	Addison	Ella	Abigail	Evelyn	Grace
Wyoming	Emma	Olivia	Addison	Sophia	Isabella	Madison	Elizabeth	Abigail	Zoey	Emily

== 2012 ==
Male names
Region	No. 1	No. 2	No. 3	No. 4	No. 5	No. 6	No. 7	No. 8	No. 9	No. 10
Alabama	William	James	Mason	John	Jacob	Elijah	Aiden	Michael	Jayden	Noah
Alaska	James	Ethan	Liam	Gabriel	Jacob, Mason, Noah, William	Michael	Elijah	Robert	Joseph	Tyler
Arizona	Jacob	Liam	Daniel	Ethan	Anthony	Alexander	Noah	Michael	Mason	Aiden
Arkansas	William	Mason	James	Jacob	Elijah	Ethan, Hunter	Aiden	Jayden	Gabriel, Jackson	Noah
California	Jacob	Jayden	Daniel	Ethan	Matthew	Noah	Anthony	Alexander	Nathan	David
Colorado	Liam	Alexander	Jacob	William	Noah	Elijah	Ethan	Logan	Jackson	Mason
Connecticut	Mason	Jacob	Michael	Liam	Ethan	Jayden	Anthony	Matthew	Noah	Ryan
Delaware	Michael	Anthony	Mason	Liam	Alexander, Christopher	Ethan	William	Elijah, Logan	John	Jacob, Jayden
District of Columbia	William	Alexander	Henry	John	James	Daniel	Benjamin, Samuel	David, Jacob	Anthony, Christopher	Elijah
Florida	Jayden	Jacob	Ethan	Michael	Mason	Noah	Liam	Alexander	Elijah	Aiden
Georgia	William	Mason	Jacob	Michael	Jayden	Ethan	Joshua	Elijah	Noah	Aiden
Hawaii	Ethan	Noah	Mason	Elijah	Logan	Jacob	Liam	James	Daniel, Jayden	Aiden, David, Gabriel, Micah
Idaho	Liam	William	Mason, Samuel	Logan	Wyatt	Ethan	Michael	Carter	Hunter, Jacob	Aiden, Andrew, Jackson
Illinois	Jacob	Alexander, Noah	Michael	Ethan	Mason	Liam	Anthony	Jayden	Daniel	William
Indiana	Liam	Mason	Elijah	Noah	Jacob	William	Jackson	Ethan	Carter	Alexander
Iowa	Liam	Mason	Carter	William	Owen	Noah	Jacob	Henry	Logan	Jackson
Kansas	Mason	Liam	William	Noah	Jackson	Jacob	Elijah	Alexander, Henry, Logan	Gabriel	Ethan
Kentucky	William	Mason	James	Jacob	Noah	Liam	Elijah	Ethan, Jackson	Aiden	Bentley
Louisiana	Mason	Jayden	William	Noah	Liam	Michael	Ethan, Joshua	Aiden	Elijah	Landon
Maine	Mason	Liam	Noah	Owen	Jacob	Benjamin, Logan	Wyatt	Carter	Jackson	William
Maryland	Mason	Michael	Jacob, Noah	Ethan	Liam	William	Joshua	Daniel	Alexander	James
Massachusetts	Benjamin	Mason, Ryan	William	Jacob	Michael	Noah	Liam	Nathan	Ethan	Joseph
Michigan	Mason	Liam	Noah	Jacob	Carter	Ethan	Michael	Logan	Lucas	Alexander
Minnesota	Mason	William	Ethan	Liam	Henry	Owen	Benjamin	Noah	Jackson	Logan
Mississippi	William	Mason	John	James	Jayden	Aiden	Brayden	Elijah	Noah	Joshua
Missouri	Mason	William	Liam	Jackson	Jacob	Ethan	Noah	Aiden	Elijah	Landon
Montana	Liam	William	Wyatt	Mason	James	Jacob	Gabriel	Michael	Hunter	Logan
Nebraska	Liam	William	Mason	Jackson	Owen	Benjamin	Noah, Samuel	Jacob	Logan	Carter
Nevada	Alexander	Anthony	Daniel	Jayden	Jacob	Ethan	Mason	Liam	Noah	Aiden
New Hampshire	Mason	Jackson	Jacob	Liam	Noah	Benjamin, Logan, William	Lucas, Owen	Carter	Joseph	Michael
New Jersey	Michael	Anthony	Joseph	Jayden	Matthew	Ryan	Jacob	Ethan	Daniel, Mason	Alexander
New Mexico	Noah	Jacob	Elijah	Jayden	Daniel	Ethan	Gabriel	Josiah, Matthew	Aiden, Caleb, Isaiah, Joshua	David, Jeremiah
New York	Michael	Jacob	Jayden	Ethan	Mason	Joseph	Matthew	Ryan	Liam	Daniel
North Carolina	William	Mason	Jacob	Elijah	Noah	Jayden	James	Ethan	Jackson	Michael
North Dakota	Liam, Mason	Ethan	James, Noah	Jacob	Jackson	Eli, Elijah	Carter	Isaac, William	Wyatt	Aiden
Ohio	Mason	Liam	William	Noah	Michael	Jacob	Ethan	Carter	Jackson	Logan
Oklahoma	Elijah	Noah	Mason	Jacob	Aiden, Ethan	Liam	Wyatt	Jaxon	William	Alexander
Oregon	Liam	Mason	Alexander	William	Henry	Ethan	Samuel	Daniel	Benjamin	Logan
Pennsylvania	Mason	Liam	Jacob	Michael	Noah	Ryan	Ethan	Logan	Benjamin	John
Rhode Island	Mason	Michael	Jacob	Ethan	Noah	Benjamin, Logan	Anthony	Joseph	Alexander, Liam, William	Gabriel
South Carolina	William	Mason	James	Elijah	Jayden	Joshua	Jacob, Noah	Aiden	Jackson	Ethan
South Dakota	Liam	Mason	Jacob	Owen	William	Noah	Logan	Jack	Carter	Michael
Tennessee	William	Mason	Elijah	James	Jacob	Jackson	Ethan	Noah	Landon	Liam
Texas	Jacob	Jayden	Ethan	Noah	Daniel	Jose	David	Aiden	Matthew	Alexander
Utah	William	Liam	Mason	Ethan	Jacob	Samuel	Jackson	James	Luke	Jack
Vermont	Mason	Noah	Liam	Owen	Logan	Jacob	Aiden, Benjamin, Jackson, Wyatt	Henry, Oliver	Cameron	Carter
Virginia	William	Mason	Liam	Jacob	Elijah	Noah	James	Ethan	Jackson	Michael
Washington	Mason	Liam	Ethan	Alexander	Benjamin	Noah	Jacob	Daniel	Michael	James
West Virginia	Mason	Liam	Bentley	Jacob	Hunter	Landon	Aiden	Brayden, Levi	Noah	Braxton, Eli
Wisconsin	Mason	Liam	Jackson	Ethan	Owen	Logan	Noah	William	Carter	Henry
Wyoming	Liam	Mason	Logan, William	Wyatt	Hunter, Jacob, Levi, Owen	Carter	Ethan	Isaac, Jaxon, Noah	Braxton, Connor, Jace, Landon	Gavin

Female names
Region	No. 1	No. 2	No. 3	No. 4	No. 5	No. 6	No. 7	No. 8	No. 9	No. 10
Alabama	Emma	Ava	Olivia	Isabella	Madison	Abigail	Elizabeth	Ella	Chloe	Harper
Alaska	Emma	Sophia	Olivia	Abigail	Ava	Chloe, Elizabeth, Lillian	Isabella	Emily	Grace, Madison	Ella, Harper
Arizona	Sophia	Isabella	Emma	Mia	Olivia	Emily	Ava	Abigail	Sofia	Madison
Arkansas	Emma	Sophia	Ava	Isabella	Olivia	Addison	Harper	Abigail	Madison, Zoey	Chloe
California	Sophia	Isabella	Emma	Emily	Mia	Olivia	Sofia	Abigail	Samantha	Camila
Colorado	Emma	Sophia	Olivia	Isabella	Ava	Abigail	Emily	Avery	Evelyn	Mia
Connecticut	Emma	Olivia	Isabella	Sophia	Ava	Mia	Emily	Charlotte	Abigail	Madison
Delaware	Sophia	Emma, Isabella	Ava, Olivia	Emily	Madison	Aubrey, Lillian	Abigail	Amelia, Layla, Zoey	Grace, Mia	Addison, Riley
District of Columbia	Sophia	Emma	Olivia	Charlotte	Genesis, Sofia	Ava	Chloe, Madison, Zoe	Naomi	Claire	Anna, Eleanor, Elizabeth, Mia
Florida	Isabella	Sophia	Emma	Olivia	Mia	Emily	Ava	Abigail	Madison	Sofia
Georgia	Emma	Ava	Isabella	Madison	Olivia	Sophia	Emily	Abigail	Chloe	Elizabeth
Hawaii	Sophia	Emma	Isabella	Ava	Mia	Chloe	Olivia	Lily, Madison	Abigail, Aria	Emily, Khloe
Idaho	Olivia	Sophia	Emma	Ava	Elizabeth	Abigail, Chloe	Emily	Brooklyn, Hannah, Zoey	Madison	Ella
Illinois	Sophia	Olivia	Isabella	Emma	Ava	Emily	Mia	Abigail	Sofia	Elizabeth
Indiana	Emma	Sophia	Olivia	Ava	Isabella	Lillian	Addison	Abigail	Avery	Elizabeth
Iowa	Emma	Sophia	Olivia	Harper	Ava	Ella	Avery	Addison	Emily	Lillian
Kansas	Emma	Sophia	Olivia	Isabella	Ava	Elizabeth	Avery	Abigail	Harper	Madison
Kentucky	Emma	Isabella	Sophia	Ava	Abigail	Olivia	Addison	Chloe	Aubrey	Madison
Louisiana	Emma	Ava	Isabella	Olivia	Chloe	Sophia	Madison	Aubrey	Abigail	Brooklyn, Ella
Maine	Emma	Sophia	Abigail	Ava, Olivia	Natalie	Emily	Chloe	Amelia, Avery	Isabella	Grace, Lillian
Maryland	Sophia	Emma	Ava	Olivia	Isabella	Madison	Abigail	Emily	Chloe	Elizabeth
Massachusetts	Emma	Sophia	Olivia	Isabella	Ava	Emily	Abigail	Charlotte	Mia	Grace
Michigan	Emma	Sophia	Ava	Olivia	Isabella	Madison	Abigail	Ella	Aubrey	Brooklyn
Minnesota	Emma	Olivia	Sophia	Ava	Avery	Evelyn	Ella	Isabella	Grace	Abigail
Mississippi	Emma	Madison	Ava	Olivia	Chloe	Aubrey	Isabella	Brooklyn	Elizabeth	Mary
Missouri	Emma	Sophia	Olivia	Ava	Isabella	Abigail	Avery, Harper	Lillian	Addison	Ella
Montana	Emma	Olivia	Ava	Harper, Sophia	Isabella	Zoey	Emily, Lily	Grace	Ella	Abigail, Madison
Nebraska	Emma	Olivia	Sophia	Harper	Ava	Ella	Avery	Isabella	Addison, Emily, Lillian	Charlotte
Nevada	Sophia	Isabella	Emma	Olivia	Mia	Emily	Ava	Madison	Chloe	Abigail
New Hampshire	Emma, Sophia	Olivia	Isabella	Ava	Charlotte	Emily	Abigail, Ella	Madison	Grace	Hannah
New Jersey	Sophia	Isabella	Emma	Olivia	Ava	Mia	Emily	Madison	Abigail	Gianna
New Mexico	Sophia	Isabella	Emma	Mia	Aaliyah	Nevaeh	Abigail	Emily	Olivia	Madison, Sofia
New York	Sophia	Isabella	Emma	Olivia	Ava	Emily	Madison	Mia	Abigail	Chloe
North Carolina	Emma	Sophia	Ava	Olivia	Isabella	Madison	Abigail	Elizabeth	Emily	Chloe, Ella
North Dakota	Emma	Olivia	Sophia	Harper	Ava	Ella	Avery, Zoey	Grace	Aubrey, Brooklyn	Isabella, Nora
Ohio	Sophia	Emma	Ava	Olivia	Isabella	Lillian	Addison	Madison	Ella	Abigail
Oklahoma	Emma	Sophia	Isabella	Olivia	Abigail	Emily	Elizabeth	Addison	Ava	Harper
Oregon	Sophia	Emma	Olivia	Isabella	Abigail	Emily	Amelia	Ava	Addison	Elizabeth
Pennsylvania	Emma	Sophia	Ava	Olivia	Isabella	Madison	Abigail	Emily	Mia	Aubrey
Rhode Island	Sophia	Ava	Emma	Isabella	Olivia	Mia	Emily	Lily	Elizabeth	Abigail, Charlotte
South Carolina	Emma	Madison	Olivia	Isabella	Ava	Sophia	Elizabeth	Abigail	Emily	Addison
South Dakota	Emma	Harper	Sophia	Olivia	Ava	Ella	Isabella	Zoey	Addison, Avery, Brooklyn	Amelia, Grace
Tennessee	Emma	Olivia	Ava	Isabella	Sophia	Abigail	Madison	Chloe	Addison	Emily
Texas	Sophia	Isabella	Emma	Mia	Emily	Olivia	Ava	Abigail	Sofia	Camila
Utah	Emma	Olivia	Sophia	Ava, Lily	Elizabeth	Abigail	Brooklyn	Lucy	Claire	Harper
Vermont	Ava	Olivia	Emma	Sophia	Ella	Isabella	Lillian	Madison	Addison	Emily
Virginia	Sophia	Emma	Olivia	Abigail	Isabella	Ava	Madison	Emily	Charlotte	Chloe
Washington	Sophia	Emma	Olivia	Isabella	Ava, Emily	Abigail	Elizabeth	Mia	Ella	Evelyn
West Virginia	Emma	Sophia	Isabella	Ava	Olivia	Aubrey	Madison	Brooklyn	Addison	Abigail
Wisconsin	Emma	Sophia	Olivia	Ava	Isabella	Emily	Ella	Evelyn	Grace	Amelia
Wyoming	Emma	Sophia	Madison	Elizabeth	Olivia	Ava, Chloe	Addison, Ella	Grace, Hannah, Lillian	Abigail, Avery, Paisley	Harper, Isabella, Mia

== 2013 ==
Male names
Region	No. 1	No. 2	No. 3	No. 4	No. 5	No. 6	No. 7	No. 8	No. 9	No. 10
Alabama	William	Mason	James	John	Elijah	Jackson	Noah	Aiden	Jacob	Christopher
Alaska	Liam	William	Mason	Wyatt	Ethan, Noah	Jacob	Elijah, Logan	Alexander, Hunter	Gabriel, Joseph	Michael
Arizona	Noah	Jacob, Liam	Alexander	Daniel	Aiden	Michael	Mason	Anthony	Ethan	Jayden
Arkansas	William	Mason	Noah	James	Elijah	Aiden	Ethan	Bentley	Jackson	Liam
California	Jacob	Ethan	Daniel	Jayden	Matthew	Noah	Alexander	Anthony	Nathan	David
Colorado	Liam	Noah	Jackson	Alexander	William	Elijah	Logan	James	Benjamin	Mason
Connecticut	William	Mason	Jacob	Noah	Michael	Liam	Ethan	Joseph	Ryan	Dylan
Delaware	Michael	Mason	Liam	Aiden, William	Joseph	Alexander, Jackson	Noah	John	Benjamin	Ethan
District of Columbia	William	Alexander	Henry	John	Noah, Samuel	Aiden	James	Jacob	Daniel	Michael
Florida	Jayden	Jacob	Liam	Noah	Michael	Mason	Ethan	Daniel	Elijah	Anthony
Georgia	William	Mason	Noah	Elijah	James	Joshua	Ethan	Michael	Liam	Aiden
Hawaii	Liam	Mason	Noah	Ethan, Logan	William	Elijah	Alexander	Aiden, Jayden, Michael	Jacob, James	Isaiah
Idaho	Liam	Wyatt	William	Samuel	Carter	Jackson	Benjamin, Mason	Jaxon, Noah, Oliver, Owen	James	Ethan
Illinois	Noah	Alexander, Jacob	Liam	Michael	William	Benjamin, Jayden	Daniel	Mason	Ethan	Anthony
Indiana	Liam	Noah	Mason	William	Elijah	Jackson	Jacob	Lucas	Carter	Alexander
Iowa	Liam	Mason	Carter	Owen	Noah, William	Jackson	Henry, Jack, Wyatt	Logan	Landon	Jacob
Kansas	Liam	William	Mason	Jacob	Jackson	Michael	Henry	Noah	Isaac	Benjamin
Kentucky	William	Noah	Mason	James	Elijah	Hunter	Jacob	Liam	Bentley	Carter, Jackson
Louisiana	Mason	Noah	Liam	Elijah	Aiden	William	Ethan	Michael	James	John
Maine	Liam	Benjamin	Jackson	Carter	Samuel	William	Noah	Owen	Mason	Lucas
Maryland	Liam	Noah	Jacob	Mason	Ethan	Michael	William	Benjamin	Joshua	James
Massachusetts	Benjamin	William	Jacob	Ryan	Michael	Mason	Liam	Noah	John	Lucas
Michigan	Liam	Mason	Noah	Jacob	Carter	Lucas	Michael	Alexander	Jackson	William
Minnesota	William	Liam	Mason	Henry	Logan	Benjamin	Owen	Jack	Jackson, Noah	Oliver
Mississippi	William	Mason	James	John	Aiden	Noah	Jayden	Christopher, Elijah, Jacob, Joshua	Brayden	Michael
Missouri	William	Mason	Liam	Jackson	Jacob	Elijah	Noah	Benjamin	James	Henry, Wyatt
Montana	Liam	Mason	William	Wyatt	Hunter	Jackson	Elijah, Samuel	James	Gabriel, Jacob	Benjamin
Nebraska	Mason	Liam	William	Carter	Noah	Isaac, Jackson	Henry	Elijah	Jacob	Daniel
Nevada	Ethan	Mason	Jayden	Noah	Jacob	Anthony	Daniel	Liam	Aiden	Michael
New Hampshire	Liam	William	Mason	Jackson	Benjamin	Logan	Owen	Lucas	Ethan, Jacob	Carter, Connor
New Jersey	Michael	Matthew	Jacob	Joseph	Liam	Anthony	Ryan	Daniel	Alexander	Ethan
New Mexico	Noah	Elijah	Liam	Jacob	Josiah	Gabriel	Aiden	Michael	Jayden	Daniel, Joshua
New York	Jacob	Michael	Ethan	Liam	Jayden	Mason	Joseph	Noah	Matthew	Daniel
North Carolina	William	Mason	Elijah	Jacob	Noah	Liam	James	Jackson	Michael	Jayden
North Dakota	Mason	Liam	William	Jack	Easton, Eli, Wyatt	Jaxon	Ethan, Noah	Elijah	Hunter	Jackson, Logan
Ohio	Liam	Mason	Noah	William	Jacob	Carter	Jackson	Logan	James	Benjamin
Oklahoma	Mason	Liam	Noah, William	Jaxon	Elijah	Hunter	Jacob	Ethan, James	Jackson, Wyatt	Alexander
Oregon	Liam	Mason	Elijah	Benjamin	William	Henry	Ethan	Noah	Logan	Alexander
Pennsylvania	Mason	Liam	Jacob	Michael	Noah	Logan	Benjamin	Joseph	Ethan	William
Rhode Island	Mason	Liam	Benjamin	Logan	Michael	Jacob	Jayden	Matthew	Ethan, Noah	William
South Carolina	William	Mason	James	Noah	Elijah	Jacob	Michael	Joshua	Jayden	Jackson
South Dakota	Liam	Noah	Carter	Mason, William	Wyatt	Owen	Jackson	Gavin	Jacob	Michael
Tennessee	William	Mason	Elijah	James	Noah	Liam	Jacob	Ethan	Jackson	John
Texas	Jacob	Jayden	Noah	Ethan	Daniel	Jose	Alexander	David	Liam	Matthew
Utah	William	Liam	James	Jacob	Samuel	Mason	Henry	Isaac	Lincoln	Benjamin, Jack
Vermont	Mason	Owen	Carter, Ethan, Liam	Jack	Henry	Hunter	Wyatt	Oliver	Jacob, William	Aiden, Gavin, Noah
Virginia	William	Noah	Liam	Mason	Jacob	Jackson	Ethan	Elijah	James	Michael
Washington	Liam	Mason	Alexander	Ethan	Noah	Jacob	Benjamin	William	Henry	Elijah
West Virginia	Mason	Liam	Noah	Hunter	Bentley, Elijah	Brayden	Jaxon	Jackson	Landon	Jacob, Levi, Owen
Wisconsin	Liam	Mason	William	Owen	Logan	Jackson	Noah	Henry	Benjamin	Ethan
Wyoming	Liam, Wyatt	Carter	Hunter	Mason, Noah	Jace, William	Elijah	Brody, Logan, Owen, Ryker	Aiden, Landon, Michael	Ethan, James	Daniel, Jacob, Lucas

Female names
Region	No. 1	No. 2	No. 3	No. 4	No. 5	No. 6	No. 7	No. 8	No. 9	No. 10
Alabama	Emma	Ava	Olivia	Madison	Isabella	Sophia	Elizabeth	Brooklyn	Chloe	Ella
Alaska	Emma	Sophia	Abigail	Isabella	Olivia	Harper	Emily	Charlotte	Ava	Amelia
Arizona	Sophia	Isabella	Emma	Mia	Olivia	Emily	Sofia	Abigail	Ava	Madison
Arkansas	Emma	Olivia	Ava	Isabella	Sophia	Abigail	Addison	Brooklyn, Madison	Avery	Emily, Harper
California	Sophia	Isabella	Mia	Emma	Emily	Olivia	Sofia	Camila	Abigail	Samantha
Colorado	Olivia	Emma	Sophia	Ava	Isabella	Abigail	Mia	Emily	Avery	Evelyn
Connecticut	Olivia	Isabella	Emma	Sophia	Ava	Mia	Emily	Charlotte	Madison	Abigail
Delaware	Ava	Olivia	Emma	Emily	Abigail, Sophia	Isabella	Aubrey	Madison	Charlotte	Grace, Lily
District of Columbia	Charlotte	Sofia	Genesis	Emma	Zoe	Amelia, Emily, Mia	Eleanor	Elizabeth, Maya	Ashley, Ava, Madison	Isabella, Victoria
Florida	Isabella	Sophia	Emma	Olivia	Mia	Ava	Emily	Abigail	Sofia	Madison
Georgia	Emma	Olivia	Ava	Madison	Isabella	Sophia	Abigail	Emily	Elizabeth	Chloe
Hawaii	Olivia	Sophia	Ava	Emma	Mia	Chloe	Aria, Isabella	Madison	Lily	Emily
Idaho	Emma	Olivia	Sophia	Ava	Isabella	Addison, Harper	Charlotte, Chloe	Abigail	Brooklyn, Claire, Emily	Paisley
Illinois	Olivia	Sophia	Emma	Isabella	Emily	Ava	Mia	Sofia	Abigail	Amelia
Indiana	Sophia	Emma	Olivia	Ava	Isabella	Lillian	Abigail	Charlotte	Ella	Addison
Iowa	Emma	Harper	Sophia	Olivia	Ava	Isabella	Avery	Charlotte	Ella	Zoey
Kansas	Emma	Olivia	Ava	Sophia	Harper	Isabella	Avery, Charlotte	Elizabeth	Abigail	Emily, Mia
Kentucky	Emma	Sophia	Ava	Isabella	Olivia	Addison	Madison	Abigail	Avery	Chloe
Louisiana	Ava	Emma	Olivia	Sophia	Aubrey	Isabella	Madison	Avery	Chloe	Brooklyn
Maine	Sophia	Emma	Olivia	Isabella	Abigail, Charlotte	Ava	Amelia	Addison, Ella, Emily, Evelyn, Harper	Natalie	Madison
Maryland	Sophia	Olivia	Ava	Emma	Abigail	Isabella	Madison	Emily	Charlotte	Elizabeth
Massachusetts	Emma	Olivia	Sophia	Isabella	Ava	Emily	Abigail	Mia	Charlotte	Avery
Michigan	Emma	Sophia	Ava	Olivia	Isabella	Madison	Charlotte	Amelia	Avery	Abigail
Minnesota	Olivia	Emma	Sophia	Ava	Charlotte	Evelyn	Isabella	Harper	Amelia	Avery
Mississippi	Ava	Emma, Madison	Aubrey	Chloe	Brooklyn	Addison	Taylor	Olivia	Isabella	Aubree
Missouri	Emma	Olivia	Ava	Sophia	Isabella	Harper	Avery	Addison	Charlotte	Madison
Montana	Emma	Olivia	Harper	Sophia	Ava	Madison	Brooklyn	Elizabeth	Addison	Paisley
Nebraska	Emma	Olivia	Sophia	Harper	Avery, Charlotte	Isabella	Ava	Elizabeth	Emily	Ella
Nevada	Sophia	Isabella	Emma	Mia	Olivia	Sofia	Emily	Ava	Abigail	Charlotte
New Hampshire	Emma	Olivia	Sophia	Charlotte	Ava	Isabella	Abigail	Avery	Grace	Emily
New Jersey	Isabella	Sophia	Emma	Olivia	Ava	Mia	Emily	Sofia	Madison	Abigail
New Mexico	Sophia	Isabella	Emma	Mia	Olivia	Emily	Ava	Abigail	Nevaeh	Serenity
New York	Sophia	Isabella	Emma	Olivia	Mia	Ava	Emily	Madison	Abigail	Sofia
North Carolina	Emma	Ava	Sophia	Olivia	Isabella	Abigail	Madison	Elizabeth	Addison, Emily	Harper
North Dakota	Emma	Olivia	Harper	Sophia	Ava	Avery	Abigail, Ella	Addison	Isabella	Nora
Ohio	Emma	Sophia	Ava	Olivia	Isabella	Abigail	Lillian	Harper	Avery	Addison
Oklahoma	Emma	Sophia	Olivia	Ava	Isabella	Avery	Harper	Abigail	Emily	Addison
Oregon	Emma	Olivia	Sophia	Abigail	Ava	Emily	Amelia	Isabella	Evelyn	Avery
Pennsylvania	Emma	Sophia	Ava	Olivia	Isabella	Abigail	Emily	Madison	Mia	Aubrey
Rhode Island	Sophia	Isabella	Emma	Olivia	Mia	Charlotte	Abigail, Ava	Emily	Avery	Sofia
South Carolina	Emma	Madison	Olivia	Isabella	Ava	Sophia	Elizabeth	Abigail	Emily	Addison
South Dakota	Emma	Harper	Sophia	Olivia	Ava	Avery	Isabella	Grace	Alexis, Ella	Abigail
Tennessee	Emma	Ava	Olivia	Sophia	Abigail	Isabella	Madison	Emily	Elizabeth	Harper
Texas	Sophia	Emma	Isabella	Mia	Olivia	Emily	Sofia	Abigail	Ava	Victoria
Utah	Olivia	Emma	Abigail	Sophia	Ava, Charlotte	Elizabeth	Lucy	Brooklyn	Avery	Emily
Vermont	Olivia, Sophia	Emma	Avery	Ava	Amelia	Charlotte, Chloe, Ella	Elizabeth	Abigail	Grace, Lillian	Isabella, Lily, Zoey
Virginia	Emma	Olivia	Sophia	Ava	Abigail	Isabella	Charlotte	Emily	Madison	Elizabeth
Washington	Emma	Olivia	Sophia	Isabella	Abigail	Ava	Emily	Evelyn	Charlotte	Mia
West Virginia	Emma	Sophia	Olivia	Isabella	Abigail	Ava	Madison	Addison	Lillian	Aubrey, Brooklyn
Wisconsin	Emma	Olivia	Ava	Sophia	Evelyn	Isabella	Harper	Charlotte, Ella	Emily	Amelia
Wyoming	Sophia	Emma	Harper, Olivia	Paisley	Emily	Ava, Ella, Evelyn, Lillian	Isabella, Sadie	Brooklyn, Elizabeth	Alexis, Chloe, Zoey	Abigail, Addison, Amelia

== 2014 ==
Male names
Region	No. 1	No. 2	No. 3	No. 4	No. 5	No. 6	No. 7	No. 8	No. 9	No. 10
Alabama	William	James	John	Mason	Elijah	Noah	Jackson	Aiden	Jacob	Joshua
Alaska	Liam	James	Noah, Wyatt	Gabriel	Lucas	Ethan	Alexander, Joseph	Benjamin, William	Logan, Mason	Jack, John
Arizona	Noah	Liam	Alexander	Daniel	Jacob	Sebastian	Ethan	Michael	Elijah	Anthony
Arkansas	Mason	William	Noah	Elijah	James	Liam	John	Carter	Jacob	Logan
California	Noah	Jacob	Ethan	Daniel	Alexander	Matthew	Jayden	Anthony	Sebastian	David
Colorado	Liam	Alexander	Noah	William	Logan	Benjamin	Elijah	Ethan	James	Jackson
Connecticut	Mason	Noah	Alexander, Jacob	Liam	Michael	Logan	Benjamin	Anthony	William	Joseph
Delaware	Liam	Michael	Mason	Jacob, Logan	William	James	Caleb, Carter	Jackson	Alexander, Noah	Anthony, Matthew
District of Columbia	Alexander	William	John	Benjamin	Charles, James, Noah, Samuel	Henry	Jacob	Michael	Daniel, Dylan	Oliver
Florida	Noah	Liam	Jacob	Michael	Mason	Ethan	Alexander	Jayden	Elijah	Daniel
Georgia	William	Mason	Noah	James	Jacob	Elijah	Aiden	Liam	Jackson	Michael
Hawaii	Noah	Liam	Mason	Aiden	Alexander	Ethan	William	Logan	James	Ezekiel
Idaho	Liam	William	Mason	Oliver	Samuel	James	Jackson	Alexander, Jaxon	Henry, Logan, Noah	Carter
Illinois	Noah	Alexander	William	Michael	Liam	Jacob	Benjamin	Mason	Logan	Daniel
Indiana	Liam	Noah	Elijah	Mason	William	Jackson	Benjamin	Owen	Jacob	Carter
Iowa	Liam	William	Mason	Noah	Owen	Jackson	Henry	Oliver	Carter	Benjamin, James
Kansas	William	Liam	Noah	Mason	Jackson	Elijah	Oliver	Benjamin	Logan	Aiden, Alexander
Kentucky	William	Elijah	James	Mason	Noah	Liam	Hunter, Jackson	Samuel	Michael	Lucas
Louisiana	Mason	Liam	Noah	William	Elijah	John	Carter, Luke	Aiden, James	Michael	Ethan
Maine	Liam	Mason	Owen	Benjamin	Jackson, Oliver	Logan, William	Hunter	Ethan, Lucas	Wyatt	Connor
Maryland	Noah	Liam	William	Mason	Michael	Logan	Jacob	Alexander	Daniel	Ethan
Massachusetts	Benjamin	William	Jacob	Ryan	Michael	Mason	Liam	Noah	John	Lucas
Michigan	Liam	Noah	Mason	Carter	Jacob	Lucas	William	Logan	Ethan	Michael
Minnesota	Henry	William	Liam	Owen	Benjamin	Mason	Oliver	Logan	Noah	Jackson
Mississippi	William	James	John	Elijah	Mason	Noah	Christopher	Aiden, Jayden	Carter	Brayden
Missouri	Liam	William	Mason	Noah	Elijah	Jackson	Wyatt	James	Henry	Logan
Montana	William	Benjamin, Mason	Liam	Noah, Wyatt	Carter	James	Henry	Hunter	Ethan, Jackson, Owen	Gabriel
Nebraska	Liam	Mason	Noah	William	Henry	Oliver	Samuel	Logan	Jacob	Jackson
Nevada	Noah	Daniel	Ethan	Anthony, Jayden	Alexander	Liam	Mason	Michael	Jacob, Logan	Aiden
New Hampshire	Jacob	Mason	Jackson	Benjamin	Owen	Liam	Logan	Lucas, William	Oliver	Alexander
New Jersey	Michael	Matthew	Joseph	Liam	Daniel	Alexander	Noah	Jacob	Anthony, Ethan	Mason
New Mexico	Noah	Liam	Elijah	Jacob	Daniel	Josiah, Michael	Jayden	Ethan	Aiden	Joseph
New York	Jacob	Liam	Ethan	Michael	Noah	Joseph	Mason	Matthew	Alexander	Lucas
North Carolina	William	Mason	Noah	Liam	Elijah	James	Jackson	Jacob	Ethan	Carter
North Dakota	Liam	Mason	William	Noah	Owen	Easton, Hudson	Henry, Jackson	Carter	Jaxon, Michael	Hunter
Ohio	Liam	Mason	Noah	William	Carter	Michael	Elijah	Logan	Jackson	Jacob
Oklahoma	William	Mason	Liam	Noah	Elijah	Hunter	Jaxon, Luke	Ethan	Michael	James
Oregon	Liam	Henry	Noah	Benjamin	Logan	Alexander	Wyatt	Oliver, William	Mason	Jackson
Pennsylvania	Mason	Liam	Noah	Michael	Jacob	Logan	Benjamin	Joseph	Lucas	James
Rhode Island	Mason	Liam	Benjamin, Logan	Jacob, Michael	Alexander, Lucas, Noah	Ethan	William	Anthony, Matthew	Joseph	Jayden
South Carolina	William	James	Mason	Noah	Jackson	Elijah	Liam	John, Michael	Carter	Jacob
South Dakota	Liam	Lincoln	Logan	Noah	Benjamin, Jacob, Oliver, William	Henry, Jackson	Mason	Hudson	Ethan	Elijah, Samuel
Tennessee	William	Mason	Elijah, James	Noah	Liam	Jackson	John	Jacob	Ethan	Aiden
Texas	Noah	Jacob	Daniel	Liam	Jayden	Ethan	David	Sebastian	Jose	Matthew
Utah	William	Liam	James	Oliver	Lincoln	Luke	Jack	Samuel	Ethan	Mason
Vermont	Liam	Mason	Oliver	Carter	William	Jackson	Benjamin, Henry, Samuel	Michael	Jacob	Hunter, Logan, Lucas, Owen
Virginia	William	Liam	Mason	Noah	James	Jackson	Michael	Elijah	Jacob	Ethan
Washington	Liam	Benjamin	Alexander	Noah	William	Logan	Daniel, James	Oliver	Mason	Henry
West Virginia	Mason	Liam	Hunter, Noah	Colton	James, William	Jacob, Levi	Bentley	Elijah	Easton	Brantley, Landon
Wisconsin	Mason	Liam	William	Logan	Henry, Oliver	Jackson	Noah	Owen	Ethan	Alexander
Wyoming	Jackson	Mason, William, Wyatt	Liam	Logan	James	Benjamin	Gabriel, Hunter, Owen, Ryker	Aiden, David, Samuel	Andrew, Henry	Braxton

Female names
Region	No. 1	No. 2	No. 3	No. 4	No. 5	No. 6	No. 7	No. 8	No. 9	No. 10
Alabama	Ava	Emma	Olivia	Isabella	Elizabeth	Madison	Harper	Ella	Abigail	Brooklyn
Alaska	Emma	Olivia	Sophia	Aurora	Isabella	Abigail, Avery	Evelyn, Hannah	Amelia, Grace, Harper	Charlotte, Ella	Ava, Emily
Arizona	Sophia	Emma	Mia	Isabella	Olivia	Sofia	Ava	Abigail, Emily	Victoria	Charlotte
Arkansas	Emma	Olivia	Ava	Harper, Isabella	Abigail, Sophia	Madison	Avery	Emily, Zoey	Elizabeth	Brooklyn
California	Sophia	Isabella	Emma	Mia	Olivia	Emily	Sofia	Victoria	Abigail	Camila
Colorado	Olivia	Emma	Sophia	Isabella	Evelyn	Avery	Mia	Charlotte	Ava	Emily, Harper
Connecticut	Olivia	Emma	Sophia	Isabella	Ava	Mia	Charlotte	Emily	Abigail	Madison
Delaware	Sophia	Ava	Emma	Olivia	Emily, Isabella	Mia	Madison	Charlotte	Avery, Elizabeth	Lillian
District of Columbia	Elizabeth	Olivia	Ava	Emma	Zoe	Genesis, Madison	Anna, Ashley, Maya	Alexandra	Zoey	Charlotte, Ella
Florida	Isabella	Sophia	Emma	Olivia	Mia	Ava	Emily	Sofia	Abigail	Victoria
Georgia	Olivia	Ava	Emma	Madison	Isabella	Sophia	Abigail	Elizabeth	Emily	Chloe
Hawaii	Emma	Mia	Sophia	Aria, Lily	Ava	Isabella	Olivia	Chloe	Abigail	Emily, Madison
Idaho	Emma	Olivia	Charlotte	Abigail	Harper, Sophia	Elizabeth	Avery	Evelyn	Emily	Ava
Illinois	Olivia	Emma	Sophia	Isabella	Ava	Mia	Emily	Sofia	Charlotte	Abigail
Indiana	Emma	Olivia	Ava	Sophia	Isabella	Amelia	Harper	Charlotte	Abigail	Elizabeth
Iowa	Emma	Olivia	Harper	Ava	Sophia	Charlotte	Avery, Evelyn	Isabella	Lillian	Amelia, Ella
Kansas	Olivia	Emma	Harper	Ava	Sophia	Avery	Elizabeth	Isabella	Charlotte	Addison, Grace
Kentucky	Emma	Ava	Olivia	Sophia	Isabella	Harper	Addison	Avery	Abigail	Aubrey, Lillian
Louisiana	Emma	Ava	Olivia	Sophia	Aubrey	Harper	Amelia, Madison	Isabella	Avery	Brooklyn
Maine	Emma	Olivia	Charlotte	Isabella	Lillian	Ava	Amelia, Avery, Harper	Sophia	Madison	Abigail, Addison, Lydia
Maryland	Olivia	Ava	Emma	Sophia	Abigail	Isabella	Madison	Emily	Charlotte	Mia
Massachusetts	Emma	Olivia	Isabella	Sophia	Ava	Charlotte	Emily	Abigail	Grace, Mia	Avery
Michigan	Olivia	Emma	Ava	Sophia	Isabella	Charlotte	Harper	Madison	Amelia	Evelyn
Minnesota	Olivia	Emma	Evelyn	Ava	Charlotte	Sophia	Harper	Avery	Amelia	Ella
Mississippi	Ava	Emma	Olivia	Madison	Aubrey	Brooklyn	Paisley	Isabella	Chloe	Harper
Missouri	Emma	Olivia	Ava	Sophia	Harper	Avery	Lillian	Isabella	Charlotte	Abigail
Montana	Emma	Harper	Sophia	Ava	Emily, Isabella	Olivia	Ella	Avery	Charlotte, Elizabeth, Paisley	Mia
Nebraska	Olivia	Emma	Harper	Ava	Sophia	Avery	Isabella	Charlotte	Evelyn	Amelia, Elizabeth, Ella
Nevada	Emma, Sophia	Isabella	Mia	Olivia	Emily	Ava	Sofia	Madison	Abigail	Elizabeth
New Hampshire	Olivia	Charlotte	Sophia	Ava	Emma	Isabella	Emily	Abigail	Harper	Addison
New Jersey	Sophia	Olivia	Emma	Isabella	Mia	Ava	Emily	Sofia	Abigail	Madison
New Mexico	Mia	Sophia	Isabella	Emma	Olivia	Emily	Sofia	Aria	Ava	Ariana
New York	Sophia	Olivia	Emma	Isabella	Mia	Ava	Emily	Abigail	Madison	Sofia
North Carolina	Ava	Emma	Olivia	Sophia	Isabella	Madison	Abigail	Emily	Harper	Elizabeth
North Dakota	Harper	Emma	Olivia	Ava	Avery	Zoey	Amelia	Nora	Madison	Aubrey, Ellie, Sophia
Ohio	Emma	Olivia	Ava	Sophia	Isabella	Harper	Avery	Lillian	Abigail	Charlotte
Oklahoma	Emma	Olivia	Harper	Isabella	Sophia	Ava	Abigail	Emily	Elizabeth	Avery
Oregon	Emma	Olivia	Sophia	Abigail, Isabella	Evelyn	Emily	Ava	Elizabeth	Amelia	Charlotte
Pennsylvania	Emma	Olivia	Ava	Sophia	Isabella	Mia	Charlotte	Abigail	Emily	Madison
Rhode Island	Olivia	Ava	Emma	Sophia	Isabella	Mia	Charlotte	Avery	Abigail	Aria, Ella, Gabriella
South Carolina	Emma	Ava	Olivia	Madison	Isabella	Elizabeth	Abigail	Sophia	Zoey	Harper
South Dakota	Harper	Ava	Olivia	Emma	Sophia	Ella	Evelyn	Nora	Hadley	Amelia
Tennessee	Emma	Olivia	Ava	Sophia	Isabella	Abigail	Harper	Madison	Elizabeth	Ella
Texas	Emma	Sophia	Isabella	Mia	Olivia	Sofia	Emily	Ava	Abigail	Victoria
Utah	Olivia	Emma	Charlotte	Lucy	Harper	Ruby	Evelyn	Ava, Lily	Abigail	Brooklyn
Vermont	Emma, Olivia	Sophia	Ava	Abigail	Amelia	Charlotte	Harper	Hannah	Chloe	Aubrey, Nora
Virginia	Emma	Olivia	Ava	Sophia	Abigail	Isabella	Charlotte	Emily, Madison	Harper	Elizabeth
Washington	Olivia	Emma	Sophia	Ava	Emily	Isabella	Abigail	Charlotte	Mia	Evelyn
West Virginia	Sophia	Emma	Olivia	Isabella	Ava	Abigail	Lillian	Zoey	Harper	Avery
Wisconsin	Olivia	Emma	Ava	Evelyn	Sophia	Harper	Charlotte	Isabella	Abigail	Nora
Wyoming	Olivia	Brooklyn, Emma	Abigail	Elizabeth, Harper	Sophia	Avery, Evelyn	Amelia	Ava, Charlotte, Zoey	Aubrey	Chloe, Isabella, Mia, Oakley, Paisley

== 2015 ==
Male names
Region	No. 1	No. 2	No. 3	No. 4	No. 5	No. 6	No. 7	No. 8	No. 9	No. 10
Alabama	William	James	John	Mason	Elijah	Noah	Jackson	Carter	Michael	Samuel
Alaska	Liam	Noah	James	William	Oliver	Joseph, Owen	Gabriel	Alexander, Michael, Wyatt	Jackson, Jacob	Benjamin, Logan, Samuel
Arizona	Noah	Liam	Alexander	Michael	Ethan	Daniel	Jacob	Sebastian	Aiden	Julian
Arkansas	William	Elijah	Mason	Noah	James	Liam	Jacob	John	Gabriel	Carter
California	Noah	Jacob	Ethan	Daniel	Matthew	Alexander	Jayden	Sebastian	Liam	David
Colorado	Liam	William	Jackson	Alexander	Oliver	Benjamin	Noah	James	Wyatt	Logan
Connecticut	Noah	Mason	Alexander	Liam	Benjamin	Jacob	William	Michael	Logan, Matthew	Joseph
Delaware	Mason	Noah	Liam	Jackson	Michael	Alexander, Benjamin	Anthony, Luke, William	Aiden	James	Christopher
District of Columbia	William	Henry	James	Alexander	Jacob	Michael, Noah, Samuel	Benjamin	Charles, Daniel	Dylan, John, Matthew	David
Florida	Liam	Noah	Jacob	Mason	Ethan, Lucas	Alexander	Michael	Elijah	Daniel	Matthew
Georgia	William	Noah	Mason	Elijah	James	Aiden	Jacob	Jackson	Carter, Ethan	Liam
Hawaii	Noah	Liam	Mason	Ezekiel	Aiden, William	Elijah, Ethan, Logan	Caleb	Luke	Ezra	Alexander
Idaho	Liam	William	Oliver	James	Wyatt	Logan	Elijah, Lucas	Jackson	Noah	Carter, Hudson, Mason
Illinois	Noah	Liam	Alexander	Jacob	William	Michael	Benjamin	Daniel	Mason	James
Indiana	Liam	Noah	Oliver	Elijah	Mason	William	Jackson	Carter	Lucas	Owen
Iowa	Liam	William	Oliver	Henry	Owen	Noah	Mason	Elijah	Wyatt	Jackson
Kansas	Liam	William	Mason	Oliver	Wyatt	Noah	Ethan, Henry, Owen	Benjamin	Carter, Logan	Alexander
Kentucky	William	Mason	Elijah	James	Noah	Jackson, Liam	Hunter, Jaxon	Levi	Aiden	John
Louisiana	Noah	Mason	Liam	Elijah	William	Carter	John	Aiden	James	Luke
Maine	Liam, Owen	Mason	Oliver	Wyatt	Jackson	William	Hunter	Lucas	Noah	Alexander, Benjamin, Carter, Henry
Maryland	Noah	Logan	James	Mason	Jacob	William	Liam	Michael	Ethan	Benjamin
Massachusetts	Benjamin	William	Noah	Mason	James	Liam	Jacob, Lucas	Michael	Jack	Logan
Michigan	Noah	Liam	Carter	Mason	Lucas	Jacob	Benjamin	Jackson, Owen	Elijah	Logan
Minnesota	Henry	Oliver	William	Liam	Mason	Jack	Owen	Jackson, Lucas	James	Ethan
Mississippi	William	John	James	Mason	Elijah	Aiden	Noah	Carter	Jayden	Christian
Missouri	Liam	William	Mason	Henry	Jackson	Oliver	Elijah	Noah	Carter	James
Montana	William	Liam, Wyatt	Oliver	James	Carter	Mason	Henry, Hunter, Logan, Luke	Noah, Samuel	Michael	Jackson
Nebraska	Henry	William	Liam	Noah	Oliver	Owen	Carter	Samuel	Mason	Isaac
Nevada	Noah	Liam	Alexander	Jacob	Anthony, Michael	Jayden	Sebastian	Daniel	Julian, Mason	Ethan
New Hampshire	Jackson	Benjamin	Owen	Mason, Noah	Logan	William	Jack	Liam, Oliver	Carter	Alexander
New Jersey	Liam	Michael	Jacob	Noah	Mason	Matthew	Joseph	Dylan	Anthony	Daniel
New Mexico	Noah	Elijah	Liam	Michael	Aiden	Josiah	Alexander	Gabriel, Jacob	Daniel	Matthew
New York	Liam	Jacob	Ethan	Noah	Michael	Matthew	Mason	Joseph	Lucas	Daniel
North Carolina	William	Noah	Mason	Liam	James	Elijah	Jackson	Jacob	Carter	Aiden
North Dakota	Liam	Oliver	Carter, Owen	Henry, Mason	William	Noah	Easton, Wyatt	Hudson, Jaxon, Lucas	Lincoln	Elijah
Ohio	Liam	Mason	Noah	Carter	William	Jackson	Logan, Owen	Benjamin, James	Henry	Jacob
Oklahoma	Elijah	Jaxon, William	Liam	Noah	Wyatt	Mason	James	Jackson	Benjamin	Gabriel
Oregon	Liam	Henry	Oliver	James, Noah	Mason, Wyatt	Elijah	Alexander, William	Benjamin	Jackson	Logan
Pennsylvania	Mason	Liam	Noah	Michael	Jacob	Logan	Benjamin	Carter	James	Lucas
Rhode Island	Noah	Liam, Mason	Logan	Alexander	Michael	Benjamin	Lucas	Jacob	Anthony	Joseph
South Carolina	William	James	Mason	Noah	Elijah	Liam	Michael	Jackson	John	Aiden, Carter
South Dakota	Oliver	Owen	Liam	Jackson	Levi	Mason	Henry, James	Benjamin	Hudson, Noah	Hunter, Jacob
Tennessee	William	James	Elijah, Mason	Noah	Jackson	Liam	John	Jacob	Carter	Aiden
Texas	Noah	Liam	Jacob	Ethan	Daniel	Matthew	Sebastian	Alexander	Jayden, Jose	Aiden
Utah	William	Oliver	James	Liam	Lincoln	Henry	Mason	Jack	Owen	Benjamin
Vermont	Liam	Oliver	Jackson	Mason	Owen	Carter	Wyatt	Samuel	Noah	Alexander, Logan
Virginia	William	Noah	Liam	James	Mason	Jackson	Jacob	Elijah	Michael	Benjamin
Washington	Oliver	Noah	Liam	Benjamin	Henry	William	Logan	Alexander, Samuel	James	Mason
West Virginia	Noah	Liam	Mason	Hunter	Levi	Wyatt	James	Jaxon	William	Easton
Wisconsin	Oliver	Owen	Liam	Noah	Mason	Henry	Jackson	Logan	William	Benjamin
Wyoming	Liam	Mason	Benjamin, Wyatt	Luke	Noah	Logan	Jaxon, Ryker	Carter, Isaac, Samuel	Jace, Oliver	Alexander, Henry

Female names
Region	No. 1	No. 2	No. 3	No. 4	No. 5	No. 6	No. 7	No. 8	No. 9	No. 10
Alabama	Ava	Emma	Olivia	Harper	Elizabeth	Madison	Amelia, Isabella, Skylar	Anna, Sophia	Ella	Caroline, Mia
Alaska	Olivia	Emma	Aurora	Amelia, Ava	Abigail	Harper	Sophia	Elizabeth	Emily, Evelyn, Hazel, Madison	Lillian, Scarlett
Arizona	Sophia	Mia	Emma	Isabella	Sofia	Emily	Ava	Victoria	Abigail	Charlotte
Arkansas	Emma	Olivia	Ava	Isabella	Harper	Sophia	Abigail	Avery	Paisley	Ella
California	Sophia	Mia	Emma	Olivia	Isabella	Emily	Sofia	Abigail	Victoria	Ava
Colorado	Emma	Olivia	Mia	Evelyn	Sophia	Ava	Abigail	Charlotte	Isabella	Harper
Connecticut	Sophia	Emma	Olivia	Isabella	Ava	Mia	Charlotte	Emily	Abigail, Madison	Amelia
Delaware	Ava	Olivia	Sophia	Abigail	Emma	Mia	Madison	Grace, Savannah	Charlotte	Isabella
District of Columbia	Genesis	Ava, Charlotte	Sofia	Emma, Olivia	Caroline	Elizabeth, Sophia	Skylar	Eleanor	Ashley, Emily, Zoe	Abigail
Florida	Isabella	Emma	Sophia	Olivia	Mia	Ava	Emily	Sofia	Abigail	Madison
Georgia	Ava	Olivia	Emma	Madison	Isabella	Sophia	Abigail	Emily	Charlotte	Harper
Hawaii	Mia	Emma	Olivia	Aria, Ava	Isabella	Sophia	Mila	Chloe, Madison	Lily	Amelia
Idaho	Olivia	Emma	Evelyn	Ava, Harper	Sophia	Avery	Charlotte, Elizabeth	Abigail	Emily	Mia
Illinois	Olivia	Emma	Sophia	Mia	Isabella	Ava	Sofia	Abigail	Emily	Amelia
Indiana	Emma	Olivia	Ava	Harper	Sophia	Charlotte	Amelia	Abigail	Isabella	Mia
Iowa	Emma	Olivia	Harper	Evelyn	Sophia	Ava	Charlotte	Amelia	Avery	Mia
Kansas	Emma	Olivia	Harper	Ava	Sophia	Elizabeth	Charlotte	Abigail	Avery	Mia
Kentucky	Emma	Olivia	Ava	Harper	Isabella	Addison	Sophia	Paisley	Abigail	Ella
Louisiana	Ava	Emma	Olivia	Isabella	Harper, Madison	Aubrey	Avery	Amelia	Sophia	Mia
Maine	Emma	Olivia	Amelia	Abigail	Harper	Ava	Sophia	Charlotte	Isabella	Ella
Maryland	Olivia	Ava	Sophia	Emma	Charlotte	Madison	Isabella	Abigail	Mia	Elizabeth
Massachusetts	Olivia	Emma	Sophia	Isabella	Charlotte	Ava	Emily	Mia	Abigail	Grace
Michigan	Olivia	Ava	Emma	Sophia	Charlotte	Harper	Isabella	Amelia	Evelyn	Abigail
Minnesota	Olivia	Emma	Evelyn	Ava	Nora	Charlotte	Harper	Sophia	Amelia	Grace
Mississippi	Ava	Emma	Olivia	Madison	Brooklyn	Paisley	Addison	Aubrey	Chloe, Mary	Elizabeth
Missouri	Emma	Olivia	Ava	Harper	Charlotte	Sophia	Amelia	Abigail	Evelyn	Avery
Montana	Emma	Olivia	Harper	Ava	Aurora	Elizabeth	Evelyn	Hazel, Paisley	Sophia	Abigail, Elizabeth
Nebraska	Emma, Olivia	Harper	Charlotte	Ava	Elizabeth	Sophia	Mia	Evelyn	Avery, Isabella	Grace
Nevada	Sophia	Olivia	Mia	Isabella	Emma	Emily	Ava	Sofia	Abigail	Charlotte
New Hampshire	Olivia	Charlotte	Emma	Sophia	Ava	Amelia	Isabella	Emily, Harper, Lillian	Abigail	Madison
New Jersey	Emma	Isabella, Sophia	Olivia	Mia	Ava	Emily	Abigail	Madison	Charlotte	Sofia
New Mexico	Mia	Sophia	Isabella	Ava	Emma, Olivia	Sofia	Abigail	Aria	Emily	Avery, Layla
New York	Olivia	Emma	Sophia	Isabella	Mia	Ava	Emily	Charlotte	Madison	Abigail
North Carolina	Ava	Emma	Olivia	Isabella	Sophia	Abigail	Madison	Harper	Elizabeth	Charlotte
North Dakota	Ava	Emma	Olivia	Harper	Avery	Sophia	Charlotte	Paisley	Aubrey	Addison, Nora
Ohio	Emma	Ava	Olivia	Sophia	Harper	Isabella	Evelyn	Charlotte	Avery	Amelia
Oklahoma	Emma	Olivia	Ava	Isabella	Sophia	Elizabeth, Harper	Abigail	Mia	Paisley	Avery
Oregon	Emma	Olivia	Sophia	Abigail	Charlotte	Evelyn	Ava, Mia	Amelia	Harper, Isabella	Emily
Pennsylvania	Olivia	Emma	Ava	Sophia	Isabella	Mia	Abigail	Charlotte	Avery	Emily
Rhode Island	Olivia	Emma	Sophia	Ava	Isabella	Charlotte	Mia	Amelia, Avery	Emily	Grace
South Carolina	Ava	Olivia	Emma	Madison	Elizabeth	Isabella	Harper	Abigail	Skylar	Emily
South Dakota	Harper	Emma	Olivia	Ava	Evelyn, Sophia	Avery	Grace	Nora	Amelia	Addison
Tennessee	Emma	Ava, Olivia	Harper	Isabella	Sophia	Abigail	Elizabeth	Madison	Amelia	Chloe
Texas	Emma	Sophia	Mia	Isabella	Olivia	Sofia	Ava	Abigail	Emily	Victoria
Utah	Emma	Olivia	Charlotte	Evelyn	Harper	Ava, Hazel	Sophia	Amelia	Lucy	Ellie
Vermont	Emma	Ava	Harper	Charlotte	Isabella	Olivia, Sophia	Elizabeth, Ella, Grace, Lily, Piper	Anna, Evelyn	Hannah	Alexis, Eleanor, Nora
Virginia	Emma	Ava	Olivia	Charlotte	Sophia	Abigail	Isabella	Elizabeth, Madison	Harper	Mia
Washington	Olivia	Emma	Sophia	Ava	Evelyn	Emily	Isabella	Mia	Charlotte	Elizabeth
West Virginia	Emma	Ava	Olivia	Harper	Isabella, Sophia	Paisley	Amelia	Avery	Lillian	Aubrey
Wisconsin	Emma	Olivia	Evelyn	Ava	Charlotte	Harper	Sophia	Amelia	Nora	Ella
Wyoming	Emma	Harper	Olivia	Ava, Evelyn	Amelia	Charlotte, Natalie	Aria, Emily	Zoey	Abigail, Brooklyn, Elizabeth	Aspen, Ella

== 2016 ==
Male names
Region	No. 1	No. 2	No. 3	No. 4	No. 5	No. 6	No. 7	No. 8	No. 9	No. 10
Alabama	William	James	John	Mason	Elijah	Noah	Jackson	Michael	Liam	Carter
Alaska	Liam, Oliver	James	William	Joseph, Lucas, Noah, Owen	Logan, Mason	Elijah	David, Jackson, Jacob, Wyatt	Benjamin	Gabriel	Henry
Arizona	Liam	Noah	Sebastian	Daniel	Alexander	Michael	Julian	Oliver	Benjamin	Elijah
Arkansas	Elijah	William	Mason	Noah	James	Liam	Grayson	Wyatt	Oliver	Jackson
California	Noah	Matthew	Ethan	Daniel	Sebastian	Jacob	Alexander	Liam	Julian	Benjamin
Colorado	Liam	Noah	Oliver	William	Benjamin	Owen	Mason	Samuel	James	Wyatt
Connecticut	Noah	James	Michael	Liam	Jacob, William	Benjamin, Mason	Alexander	Lucas	Ethan	Joseph
Delaware	Liam	Michael	Mason	Noah	Alexander	Logan	Jacob, William	Benjamin	Carter	Jackson
District of Columbia	William	Alexander	Henry	Noah	Benjamin	James, Samuel	Jacob	Dylan	Michael	John
Florida	Liam	Noah	Jacob	Lucas	Elijah	Michael	Mason, Matthew	Ethan	Alexander	Jayden
Georgia	William	Noah	Mason	James	Elijah	Liam	Aiden, Carter	Michael	Ethan	Jacob
Hawaii	Noah	Liam	Ethan	Elijah	William	Logan, Luke	Aiden, Ezekiel, James	Jacob, Lucas	Mason	Alexander
Idaho	Oliver	Liam	Mason	James, William	Wyatt	Lincoln	Noah	Henry	Grayson, Owen	Benjamin
Illinois	Noah	Liam	Alexander	William	Benjamin	Michael	Oliver	Daniel	Ethan	Jacob
Indiana	Oliver	Liam	Elijah, Noah	Benjamin	William	Mason	Lucas	Henry	Wyatt	James
Iowa	Oliver	Owen	William	Henry, Wyatt	Liam	Benjamin	Noah	Jackson	Grayson	Jack
Kansas	Benjamin	Henry	William	Liam	Noah	James	Oliver	Jackson	Owen	Ethan
Kentucky	William	Elijah	James, Noah	Liam	Grayson	Wyatt	Mason	Oliver	Jackson	Jaxon
Louisiana	Liam	Noah	Mason	Elijah	William	Luke	Carter	John	James	Wyatt
Maine	Liam	Owen	Benjamin	Mason	William	Wyatt	Jackson	Lucas, Oliver	Samuel	Noah
Maryland	Noah	Mason	Liam	Ethan	Daniel, Michael	Jacob	Benjamin, Dylan	James	William	Matthew
Massachusetts	Benjamin	William	James	Noah	Lucas	Liam	John	Jack	Michael	Owen
Michigan	Noah	Mason	Benjamin	Liam	Carter	Elijah	Oliver	Lucas	James	Owen
Minnesota	Henry	Oliver	William	Owen	Liam	Jack	Mason	James	Noah	Theodore
Mississippi	William	James	Mason	John	Elijah	Noah	Carter	Aiden	Kingston	Michael
Missouri	William	Liam	Mason	Noah	Oliver	Henry	Elijah, James	Lucas	Benjamin	Wyatt
Montana	James	Liam	Owen	Oliver	Henry	Lincoln	Benjamin	Logan, Noah, William	Wyatt	Grayson
Nebraska	Liam	Henry, Oliver	Owen	Mason	Benjamin	William	Elijah	Wyatt	Alexander, Noah	James, Ryker
Nevada	Liam	Alexander	Noah	Mason	Sebastian	Ethan	Daniel, Jacob	Aiden	Anthony	Elijah, Michael
New Hampshire	Noah	William	Owen	Benjamin	Jackson, Mason, Oliver	Liam	Lucas	Jacob	Logan	Henry
New Jersey	Liam	Noah	Matthew	Michael	Jacob	Joseph	Lucas	Dylan	Mason	Alexander
New Mexico	Elijah	Noah	Liam	Josiah	Michael	Sebastian	Ethan	Jacob	Jayden	Aiden, Isaiah
New York	Liam	Jacob	Noah	Ethan	Michael	Lucas	Matthew	Joseph	Mason	Daniel
North Carolina	William	Noah	Mason	Liam	Elijah	James	Benjamin, Jackson	Michael	Grayson	Carter
North Dakota	Oliver	William	Easton	Owen	Liam	Mason	James	Henry	Wyatt	Hudson
Ohio	Liam	Noah	Carter	William	Mason	Owen	Benjamin	Jackson, Oliver	Elijah	James
Oklahoma	Liam	Elijah	Oliver	Noah	Mason	Jaxon, Wyatt	William	Luke	James	Michael
Oregon	Oliver	Henry	William	Benjamin	Liam	Wyatt	Owen	Noah	Mason	Elijah
Pennsylvania	Noah	Liam	Mason	Benjamin	James	Michael	Jacob	Logan, Owen	Lucas	Alexander
Rhode Island	Liam	Noah	Benjamin	Michael	Jacob	Lucas, Mason, Oliver	James, Julian	John	Logan	Joseph
South Carolina	William	Noah	James	Mason	Elijah	Liam	John, Michael	Carter	Jackson	Jacob
South Dakota	Oliver	Liam	Owen	Grayson	William	Jackson	Lincoln	Hudson	Benjamin, Samuel	Logan
Tennessee	William	James	Elijah	Mason	Noah	Liam	Jackson	Benjamin	Aiden	John
Texas	Noah	Liam	Sebastian	Daniel	Matthew	Jacob	Elijah	Ethan	Jose	David
Utah	Oliver	William	Liam	James	Henry	Lincoln	Benjamin	Owen	Jack, Samuel	Jackson
Vermont	Owen	Oliver	Wyatt	William	Carter, Henry	Benjamin	Levi	Liam	Mason	Hunter, Lucas, Noah, Sawyer
Virginia	William	Noah	James	Liam	Mason	Jacob	Elijah, Jackson	Benjamin	Lucas	Ethan
Washington	Liam	Benjamin	Oliver	James	Noah	William	Henry	Ethan	Elijah	Alexander
West Virginia	Mason	Noah	Liam	Grayson	James	Carter	Hunter	Braxton, Owen, Wyatt	Easton	Jaxon
Wisconsin	Oliver	Henry	Liam	Owen	Mason	William	Noah	Jackson, Wyatt	Carter	Elijah
Wyoming	Wyatt	Liam	William	Lincoln	Henry, Isaac	Gabriel, Lucas	Daniel, Jackson	Easton, Hunter, James, Owen	Bridger, Cooper, Mason	Carter, Jack, Oliver, Samuel

Female names
Region	No. 1	No. 2	No. 3	No. 4	No. 5	No. 6	No. 7	No. 8	No. 9	No. 10
Alabama	Ava	Emma	Olivia	Elizabeth	Harper	Madison	Amelia	Caroline	Isabella	Ella
Alaska	Emma	Olivia	Amelia, Charlotte	Sophia	Abigail, Ava, Elizabeth	Aurora	Chloe	Evelyn, Isabella, Mia	Harper, Lillian	Addison, Aria, Scarlett
Arizona	Emma	Sophia	Mia, Olivia	Isabella	Ava	Emily	Sofia	Abigail	Charlotte	Amelia
Arkansas	Ava	Emma	Olivia	Abigail	Harper	Sophia	Paisley	Addison	Isabella	Mia
California	Mia	Sophia	Emma	Olivia	Isabella	Emily	Sofia	Camila	Ava	Abigail
Colorado	Olivia	Emma	Charlotte	Isabella	Sophia	Evelyn	Ava	Mia	Abigail	Harper
Connecticut	Olivia	Charlotte	Mia	Ava	Isabella	Sophia	Emma	Abigail	Amelia	Emily
Delaware	Ava, Olivia	Emma	Charlotte	Sophia	Isabella	Elizabeth, Harper	Riley	Aubrey	Abigail	Emily
District of Columbia	Ava	Sofia	Charlotte	Olivia	Emma	Elizabeth	Abigail, Riley, Zoe	Isabella	Mia	Grace
Florida	Isabella	Olivia	Emma	Sophia	Mia	Ava	Emily	Abigail	Sofia	Amelia
Georgia	Ava	Olivia	Emma	Isabella	Madison	Charlotte	Sophia	Harper	Amelia	Abigail
Hawaii	Olivia	Mia	Emma	Isabella	Ava	Riley	Aria	Amelia, Sophia	Grace	Harper, Mila
Idaho	Emma	Olivia	Harper	Abigail	Ava, Evelyn	Charlotte	Elizabeth	Emily	Amelia	Ella, Sophia
Illinois	Olivia	Emma	Sophia	Ava	Mia	Isabella	Charlotte	Evelyn	Emily	Sofia
Indiana	Emma	Olivia	Ava	Charlotte	Harper	Amelia	Sophia	Evelyn, Isabella	Abigail	Mia
Iowa	Olivia	Emma	Harper	Evelyn	Ava, Charlotte	Nora	Amelia	Sophia	Addison	Grace, Isabella
Kansas	Emma	Olivia	Charlotte	Sophia	Ava	Harper	Mia	Elizabeth	Evelyn	Amelia, Avery
Kentucky	Emma	Ava	Olivia	Harper	Isabella, Sophia	Amelia	Abigail	Charlotte	Addison, Elizabeth, Mia	Evelyn
Louisiana	Ava	Olivia	Emma	Amelia	Harper	Charlotte	Mia, Sophia	Madison	Avery	Caroline
Maine	Emma	Charlotte	Olivia	Sophia	Harper	Ava, Natalie	Abigail, Evelyn	Amelia	Grace	Isabella
Maryland	Ava	Olivia	Emma	Charlotte	Sophia	Abigail	Isabella	Harper	Elizabeth	Emily, Madison
Massachusetts	Olivia	Emma	Charlotte	Sophia	Isabella	Ava	Mia	Isabella	Grace	Amelia
Michigan	Ava	Olivia	Emma	Charlotte	Sophia	Harper	Amelia	Evelyn	Isabella	Abigail
Minnesota	Evelyn	Olivia	Emma	Charlotte	Harper	Ava	Grace	Amelia	Sophia	Nora
Mississippi	Ava	Olivia	Emma	Brooklyn, Harper	Skylar	Paisley	Madison	Chloe	Isabella	Avery, Elizabeth
Missouri	Olivia	Emma	Charlotte	Harper	Ava	Amelia	Sophia	Evelyn	Avery	Isabella
Montana	Harper	Olivia	Emma	Ava, Madison	Charlotte	Abigail	Evelyn, Lillian	Avery	Lily, Paisley	Amelia, Zoey
Nebraska	Emma	Harper	Ava	Olivia	Charlotte	Sophia	Evelyn	Avery	Mia	Elizabeth, Emily
Nevada	Mia	Sophia	Olivia	Emma	Isabella	Ava, Emily	Sofia	Abigail	Scarlett	Harper
New Hampshire	Charlotte	Emma	Olivia	Harper	Amelia	Sophia	Lillian	Abigail, Isabella	Ava, Madison	Nora
New Jersey	Mia, Olivia	Emma	Sophia	Isabella	Ava	Charlotte	Emily	Abigail	Madison	Sofia
New Mexico	Mia	Sophia	Emma, Olivia	Isabella	Ava	Emily, Sofia	Layla	Amelia, Ximena	Abigail, Aria, Madison	Charlotte
New York	Olivia	Emma	Sophia	Isabella	Ava	Mia	Charlotte	Emily	Madison	Abigail
North Carolina	Ava	Emma	Olivia	Charlotte	Harper	Abigail	Isabella	Sophia	Elizabeth	Madison
North Dakota	Harper, Olivia	Emma	Evelyn	Amelia, Charlotte	Ella, Nora	Addison	Ava	Grace	Avery	Hazel
Ohio	Emma	Ava	Olivia	Charlotte	Harper	Sophia	Evelyn	Amelia	Isabella	Avery
Oklahoma	Emma	Olivia	Ava	Sophia	Abigail, Harper	Isabella	Mia	Charlotte, Elizabeth	Evelyn	Emily
Oregon	Olivia	Emma	Sophia	Evelyn	Charlotte	Abigail, Harper	Amelia	Isabella	Ava	Mia
Pennsylvania	Emma	Olivia	Ava	Charlotte	Sophia	Isabella	Harper	Mia	Abigail	Emily
Rhode Island	Olivia	Isabella	Charlotte	Emma	Ava	Mia, Sophia	Amelia, Avery	Abigail, Emily	Grace	Aria
South Carolina	Ava	Emma	Olivia	Charlotte	Madison	Isabella	Harper	Elizabeth	Riley	Caroline, Skylar
South Dakota	Emma	Harper	Olivia	Charlotte	Ava	Avery	Sophia	Elizabeth	Evelyn, Nora	Ella
Tennessee	Emma	Ava	Olivia	Harper	Isabella	Amelia	Ella	Elizabeth	Sophia	Charlotte
Texas	Emma	Mia	Sophia	Olivia	Isabella	Sofia	Ava	Camila	Abigail	Emily
Utah	Olivia	Emma	Charlotte	Evelyn	Harper	Lucy	Amelia	Hazel	Claire	Ava
Vermont	Harper	Charlotte	Emma	Olivia	Evelyn, Sophia	Amelia	Ava	Lillian	Abigail, Ella	Grace, Isabella
Virginia	Olivia	Emma	Ava	Charlotte	Abigail	Sophia	Isabella	Harper	Elizabeth	Amelia
Washington	Emma	Olivia	Evelyn	Ava	Mia	Charlotte	Amelia	Abigail	Elizabeth	Emily
West Virginia	Harper	Olivia	Ava	Emma	Isabella	Addison	Paisley	Sophia	Avery	Amelia, Brooklyn
Wisconsin	Olivia	Emma	Ava	Harper	Charlotte	Evelyn	Amelia	Sophia	Nora	Abigail
Wyoming	Emma	Olivia	Ava, Harper	Elizabeth	Emily	Avery, Evelyn, Piper	Amelia, Sophia	Nora	Hailey, Isabella, Scarlett, Zoey	Charlotte, Lily

== 2017 ==
Male names
Region	No. 1	No. 2	No. 3	No. 4	No. 5	No. 6	No. 7	No. 8	No. 9	No. 10
Alabama	William	James	Elijah	John	Noah	Mason	Liam	Samuel	Jackson	Grayson
Alaska	James	Liam	Wyatt	Oliver, William	Noah	Logan	Elijah	Benjamin, Mason, Samuel	Ethan, Henry	Ezekiel, Gabriel, Lucas, Michael
Arizona	Liam	Noah	Sebastian	Alexander	Julian	Daniel	Oliver	Benjamin	Elijah	Logan
Arkansas	Elijah	William	Noah	Liam	Mason	James	John	Carter	Oliver	Samuel
California	Noah	Sebastian	Liam	Ethan	Matthew	Daniel	Jacob	Mateo	Alexander	Julian
Colorado	Liam	Oliver	Noah	William	Benjamin	Wyatt	James	Alexander	Logan	Henry
Connecticut	Noah	Liam	Logan	Jacob	Michael	Lucas	Benjamin	James	Matthew	Joseph
Delaware	Noah	Logan	Liam	Mason	Michael	Benjamin	James	Joseph, William	Cameron, Ethan, Jackson	Alexander, Carter, Elijah, Gabriel, Owen
District of Columbia	James	Henry	William	Noah	Jacob	Benjamin, Samuel	Ethan	Liam	John, Lucas	Michael
Florida	Liam	Noah	Lucas	Elijah	Matthew	Logan	Michael	Alexander	Mason	Jacob
Georgia	William	Noah	Mason	Elijah	James	Liam	Aiden	Logan	Carter	Jacob
Hawaii	Liam	Noah	Mason	Elijah	Logan	Ethan	Ezekiel	Luke	James	Ezra
Idaho	Oliver	Liam	William	James	Samuel	Lincoln, Mason	Logan	Henry	Jackson	Elijah
Illinois	Noah	Liam	Benjamin	Logan	Alexander	James	Oliver	William	Michael	Daniel
Indiana	Oliver	Liam	Elijah	Noah	William	Benjamin	Lincoln	Mason	Carter	Owen
Iowa	Oliver	Liam	Henry	Lincoln	Wyatt	William	Owen	Noah	James	Logan
Kansas	Oliver	William	Liam	Jackson	Henry	James	Benjamin	Owen	Logan	Noah
Kentucky	William	Elijah	Noah	Liam	James	Grayson	Lincoln	Mason	Jaxon	Carter
Louisiana	Liam	Noah	Mason	Elijah	William	James	John	Luke	Carter	Grayson
Maine	Oliver	Lincoln	Liam, Owen	Wyatt	Jackson, Noah, William	Benjamin	Henry, Mason	Logan	Levi	Lucas
Maryland	Liam	Noah	James, Logan	Jacob	Dylan	Lucas	Benjamin, William	Ethan	Mason	Daniel
Massachusetts	Benjamin	William	Liam	Lucas	Noah	James	Logan	Jacob	John	Michael
Michigan	Liam	Noah	Oliver	Lucas	Mason	Benjamin	Logan	Henry	Wyatt	James
Minnesota	Oliver	William	Henry	Liam	Theodore	Logan	Mason, Noah	Wyatt	Owen	James
Mississippi	John	William	James, Mason	Elijah	Noah	Aiden	Carter	Kingston	Liam	Grayson
Missouri	William	Liam	Oliver	Noah	Elijah	James	Henry	Mason	Jackson	Lucas
Montana	James	William	Liam	Oliver	Wyatt	Jackson	Luke	Benjamin, Logan, Owen	Noah	Henry
Nebraska	Oliver	Liam	William	Henry	Noah	Samuel	James	Elijah, Mason	Owen	Logan, Wyatt
Nevada	Liam	Noah	Elijah	Michael	Sebastian	Mason	Logan	Julian	Ethan, Mateo	Oliver
New Hampshire	Logan	Henry	Mason, Owen	Oliver	Benjamin	Liam, Lincoln, William	James, Lucas	Jackson	Carter	Wyatt
New Jersey	Liam	Noah	Matthew	Michael	Jacob	Lucas	Logan	Joseph	Ethan	Dylan
New Mexico	Noah	Santiago	Elijah, Liam	Daniel	Ezekiel, Mateo	Josiah	Logan	Michael	Ethan	James
New York	Liam	Noah	Jacob	Lucas	Joseph	Michael	Matthew	Ethan	Logan	Mason
North Carolina	William	Noah	Liam	James	Mason	Elijah	Logan	Lucas	Jackson	Benjamin, Carter, Grayson
North Dakota	Oliver	Henry	Liam	Noah	William	Owen	Easton	Asher, Logan	Jack	Elijah
Ohio	Liam	Noah	Carter	William	Lucas	Oliver	Elijah	Mason	Logan	Owen
Oklahoma	William	Liam	Noah	Elijah	James	Oliver	Logan	Lincoln, Wyatt	Samuel	Benjamin
Oregon	Oliver	Liam	Henry	Benjamin	William	Logan	Noah	Wyatt	James	Samuel
Pennsylvania	Liam	Noah	Logan	Benjamin	Mason	Michael	James	Jacob	Lucas	Carter
Rhode Island	Lucas	Noah	Liam	Julian	Mason, Michael	Benjamin, Logan	Matthew	Joseph	Owen	Jacob
South Carolina	William	Noah	Mason	James	Liam	John	Elijah	Jackson	Aiden, Benjamin	Logan
South Dakota	Oliver	Owen	Lincoln	Liam	William	Henry	Logan	Hudson	Benjamin, Noah	Carter, Lucas
Tennessee	William	Elijah	James	Noah	Jackson	Mason	Liam	John	Samuel	Grayson
Texas	Noah	Liam	Sebastian	Mateo	Elijah	Matthew	Jacob	Daniel	Ethan	David
Utah	Oliver	Liam	William	James	Benjamin	Lincoln	Henry	Owen	Jack	Logan
Vermont	Wyatt	William	Oliver	Liam	Noah	Mason	Benjamin, Henry	James, Owen	Jack	Grayson
Virginia	Liam	William	Noah	James	Benjamin	Lucas	Mason	Elijah	Michael	Jackson
Washington	Liam	Oliver	Noah	William	Benjamin	Logan	Henry	Lucas	James	Elijah, Ethan
West Virginia	Liam	Mason	Elijah	Grayson	Carter	Noah	Jaxon, Lincoln	Jackson	Wyatt	Easton
Wisconsin	Henry	Oliver	William	Liam	Logan	Owen	Wyatt	Noah	Lincoln	Levi
Wyoming	Liam, Wyatt	Logan	Carter	Benjamin, James, Oliver	William	Henry	Lucas	Cooper, Grayson, Ryker	Jackson, Parker	Aiden, Easton, Jacob, Joseph, Samuel

Female names
Region	No. 1	No. 2	No. 3	No. 4	No. 5	No. 6	No. 7	No. 8	No. 9	No. 10
Alabama	Ava	Olivia	Emma	Harper	Amelia	Elizabeth	Charlotte	Avery	Ella, Evelyn	Isabella
Alaska	Emma	Olivia	Aurora	Isabella	Sophia	Evelyn	Amelia, Ava	Abigail	Charlotte, Harper	Adeline
Arizona	Emma	Isabella	Olivia	Mia	Sophia	Ava, Evelyn	Emily	Amelia	Charlotte	Victoria
Arkansas	Emma	Olivia	Ava	Harper	Isabella, Paisley	Amelia	Sophia	Abigail	Elizabeth	Charlotte
California	Emma	Mia	Olivia	Sophia	Isabella	Emily	Camila	Sofia	Abigail	Ava
Colorado	Emma	Olivia	Charlotte	Evelyn	Isabella	Mia	Sophia	Ava	Amelia	Harper
Connecticut	Olivia	Emma	Ava	Mia	Sophia	Isabella	Charlotte	Amelia	Grace	Ella
Delaware	Ava, Olivia	Charlotte	Isabella	Emma	Sophia	Harper	Abigail	Aria, Elizabeth, Emily, Evelyn	Amelia	Mia
District of Columbia	Ava	Olivia	Eleanor	Genesis	Charlotte, Elizabeth	Emma, Sophia	Amelia	Isabella, Zoe	Evelyn	Sofia
Florida	Isabella	Emma	Olivia	Sophia	Ava	Mia	Amelia	Emily	Charlotte	Abigail
Georgia	Ava	Olivia	Emma	Isabella	Charlotte	Madison	Abigail	Harper	Amelia	Elizabeth
Hawaii	Emma	Olivia	Aria	Ava	Chloe	Isabella, Mila	Sophia	Mia	Maya	Leila
Idaho	Emma	Olivia	Charlotte	Evelyn	Harper	Amelia, Ava	Abigail	Sophia	Isabella	Elizabeth
Illinois	Olivia	Emma	Ava	Sophia	Isabella	Charlotte	Mia	Amelia	Evelyn	Emily
Indiana	Emma	Olivia	Amelia	Charlotte	Harper	Ava	Sophia	Evelyn	Isabella	Nora
Iowa	Harper	Emma	Olivia	Charlotte	Evelyn	Ava	Amelia, Nora	Sophia	Scarlett	Avery, Elizabeth
Kansas	Emma	Olivia	Ava	Harper	Evelyn	Charlotte	Isabella	Amelia	Sophia	Abigail
Kentucky	Emma	Ava	Harper	Olivia	Isabella	Amelia	Sophia	Avery	Charlotte, Paisley	Elizabeth
Louisiana	Olivia	Ava	Emma	Amelia	Harper	Charlotte	Avery	Isabella	Sophia	Elizabeth
Maine	Charlotte	Olivia	Emma	Harper	Amelia	Evelyn	Lillian	Sophia	Isabella	Ava
Maryland	Ava	Olivia	Emma	Sophia	Charlotte	Isabella, Mia	Abigail	Harper	Amelia	Elizabeth
Massachusetts	Emma	Olivia	Charlotte	Sophia	Isabella	Amelia	Ava	Evelyn	Abigail	Mia
Michigan	Emma	Ava	Olivia	Charlotte	Amelia	Evelyn	Harper, Sophia	Isabella	Grace	Ella
Minnesota	Olivia	Evelyn	Emma	Charlotte	Nora	Harper	Ava	Amelia	Sophia	Eleanor
Mississippi	Ava	Emma	Olivia	Paisley	Isabella	Amelia	Madison	Kinsley	Chloe	Aubrey
Missouri	Olivia	Ava	Emma	Amelia	Harper	Charlotte	Sophia	Isabella	Evelyn	Lillian
Montana	Olivia	Emma	Harper	Ava	Charlotte	Amelia	Evelyn	Madison, Piper	Elizabeth, Lillian	Abigail, Grace, Lily
Nebraska	Emma	Olivia	Amelia, Charlotte	Evelyn	Sophia	Harper	Ava	Mia	Elizabeth, Isabella	Nora
Nevada	Emma	Mia	Isabella	Sophia	Olivia	Ava	Emily	Luna	Abigail, Scarlett	Amelia
New Hampshire	Charlotte	Evelyn	Emma	Olivia	Amelia	Ava, Harper, Isabella	Sophia	Nora	Grace	Lillian, Madison
New Jersey	Emma	Olivia	Isabella	Mia	Sophia	Ava	Charlotte	Amelia	Emily	Abigail
New Mexico	Mia	Sophia	Isabella	Olivia	Emma	Ava	Aria	Abigail, Sofia	Emily, Mila	Aurora
New York	Olivia	Emma	Sophia	Mia	Ava	Isabella	Charlotte	Amelia	Abigail	Emily
North Carolina	Ava	Emma	Olivia	Isabella	Charlotte	Harper, Sophia	Amelia	Abigail	Elizabeth	Madison
North Dakota	Emma	Harper	Olivia	Amelia	Ava	Abigail	Evelyn	Hazel	Ella, Ellie	Eleanor, Quinn, Sophia
Ohio	Emma	Ava	Olivia	Harper	Charlotte	Amelia	Isabella	Sophia	Evelyn	Lillian
Oklahoma	Emma	Olivia	Harper	Ava	Isabella	Sophia	Evelyn	Amelia	Abigail	Charlotte
Oregon	Emma	Olivia	Sophia	Charlotte	Evelyn	Amelia	Harper	Ava	Mia	Abigail
Pennsylvania	Emma	Olivia	Ava	Charlotte	Sophia	Isabella	Harper	Amelia	Mia	Ella
Rhode Island	Charlotte	Emma	Olivia	Sophia	Isabella	Amelia	Ava	Mia	Aria	Abigail
South Carolina	Ava	Emma	Olivia	Charlotte	Harper	Isabella	Amelia	Madison	Elizabeth	Skylar
South Dakota	Emma	Olivia	Harper	Evelyn	Nora	Ava	Amelia	Charlotte	Ella	Brooklyn
Tennessee	Ava	Olivia	Emma	Amelia	Harper	Isabella	Elizabeth	Charlotte	Abigail, Sophia	Ella
Texas	Emma	Mia	Isabella	Sophia	Olivia	Ava	Camila	Sofia	Abigail	Victoria
Utah	Olivia	Emma	Charlotte	Evelyn	Hazel	Lucy	Harper	Amelia	Ellie, Nora	Ava
Vermont	Evelyn	Olivia	Charlotte	Emma	Harper	Ava, Nora, Sophia	Amelia	Isabella	Madison	Chloe, Paisley
Virginia	Olivia	Ava	Emma	Charlotte	Isabella	Sophia	Harper	Abigail	Amelia, Evelyn	Elizabeth
Washington	Olivia	Emma	Evelyn	Ava	Isabella	Charlotte	Sophia	Amelia	Mia	Abigail
West Virginia	Emma	Olivia	Harper	Paisley	Amelia	Ava	Isabella	Sophia	Addison	Abigail, Avery
Wisconsin	Olivia	Emma	Evelyn	Charlotte	Ava	Amelia	Harper	Sophia	Nora	Isabella
Wyoming	Emma	Harper	Ava	Avery, Charlotte, Olivia, Sophia	Amelia, Evelyn	Elizabeth, Isabella	Abigail, Kinsley	Aurora, Ella, Grace	Adeline, Reagan	Hailey, Madison, Paisley

== 2018 ==
Male names
Region	No. 1	No. 2	No. 3	No. 4	No. 5	No. 6	No. 7	No. 8	No. 9	No. 10
Alabama	William	James	John	Elijah	Noah	Liam	Mason	Samuel	Carter	Grayson
Alaska	Oliver	Logan	Liam	Elijah, Michael	Benjamin	James	William	Grayson	Jackson, John, Joseph, Lincoln, Luke	Noah
Arizona	Liam	Noah	Sebastian	Oliver	Benjamin	Mateo	Alexander	Daniel	Elijah	Julian
Arkansas	Noah	Elijah	William	Liam	Oliver	Wyatt	Michael	Aiden	Mason	James
California	Noah	Liam	Sebastian	Mateo	Ethan	Daniel	Julian	Alexander	Benjamin	Jacob
Colorado	Liam	Oliver	William	Noah	Benjamin	Henry	James	Wyatt	Logan	Jackson
Connecticut	Noah	Liam	Benjamin	Logan	Lucas	Alexander	Joseph	James	Mason	Jack, Michael
Delaware	Liam	Noah	Mason	Logan	James	John	Alexander	William	Carter	Carson
District of Columbia	William	James	Henry	Alexander	Benjamin	John	Theodore	Daniel, Thomas	Samuel	Noah
Florida	Liam	Noah	Lucas	Elijah	Ethan, Logan	Michael	Alexander	Benjamin	Jacob	Daniel
Georgia	William	Noah	Elijah	Liam	James	Mason	Carter	Logan	John	Aiden
Hawaii	Liam	Noah	Elijah	Logan	Ezra	Ethan, Lucas	Mason	Oliver	Joseph	Kai
Idaho	Liam	Oliver	William	Henry, James	Hudson	Jackson	Owen	Benjamin	Wyatt	Lincoln
Illinois	Noah	Liam	Oliver	Benjamin	William	Alexander	Logan	James	Henry	Lucas
Indiana	Liam	Oliver	Noah	Elijah	William	Benjamin	Lincoln	Grayson	Mason	Jackson
Iowa	Oliver	Liam	Henry	William	Owen	Wyatt	Lincoln	Noah	Jackson	Hudson
Kansas	Liam	Oliver	Henry	William	Mason	Noah	Benjamin, Elijah	James	Jackson	Owen
Kentucky	William	Liam	Noah	Elijah	Grayson	Oliver	Lincoln	James	Wyatt	Lucas
Louisiana	Noah	Liam	Elijah	James	William	Mason	John	Luke	Wyatt	Oliver
Maine	Oliver	Liam	Owen	Wyatt	Henry	Logan, Lucas	Mason, Theodore	Jackson	William	James
Maryland	Liam	Noah	William	Dylan	Ethan, James	Logan	Mason	Benjamin	Jacob, Lucas	David, Michael
Massachusetts	Benjamin	Liam	James	Lucas	William	Noah	Logan	Henry	Owen	Theodore
Michigan	Noah	Oliver	Liam	Benjamin	William	Lucas	Henry	Elijah	Logan	Jackson
Minnesota	Henry	Oliver	William	Liam	Theodore	Benjamin	Jack	Owen	James	Noah
Mississippi	William	John	Noah	Elijah	James	Mason	Liam	Kingston	Carter	Aiden
Missouri	Liam	Oliver	William	Henry	Noah	Wyatt	James	Elijah	Benjamin, Jackson	Carter
Montana	Liam	William	Noah, Oliver	Henry	Jack	Grayson, James, Mason, Wyatt	Owen	Benjamin	Jackson	Lincoln, Ryker, Samuel
Nebraska	Liam	Henry	Oliver	William	Theodore	Jack	Owen	Noah	Wyatt	Mason
Nevada	Liam	Noah	Sebastian	Elijah	Daniel	Benjamin	Mateo	Jacob, Oliver	Alexander	Julian
New Hampshire	Oliver	Jackson	Mason	Liam	Henry	Lucas	Logan	Benjamin, Noah	Owen	James
New Jersey	Liam	Noah	Jacob	Michael	Matthew	Lucas	Joseph	Dylan	Logan	Benjamin
New Mexico	Noah	Liam	Elijah	Mateo	Logan	Sebastian	Mason	Daniel	Julian	Ezekiel
New York	Liam	Noah	Jacob	Lucas	Ethan	Michael	Joseph	Matthew	Alexander	Mason
North Carolina	Noah	William	Liam	James	Elijah	Mason	Jackson	Carter	Lucas	Benjamin
North Dakota	Oliver	Henry	Owen	Hudson	Easton, Logan	Noah	Jack, Liam, Wyatt	Lincoln, William	Theodore	Benjamin, Grayson
Ohio	Liam	Noah	William	Oliver	Owen	James	Carter	Henry	Michael	Lincoln, Lucas
Oklahoma	Liam	Noah	William	Elijah, Oliver	James, Lincoln, Wyatt	Jackson	Mason	Samuel	Logan	Jaxon
Oregon	Oliver	William	Benjamin	Henry	Liam	Owen	Noah	Wyatt	James	Alexander
Pennsylvania	Liam	Noah	Benjamin	Mason	Michael	Logan	Lucas	James	William	Jacob
Rhode Island	Liam	Noah	Benjamin	Alexander	Oliver	Julian	Logan	John	Michael	Jack
South Carolina	William	James	Noah	Elijah	Liam	Mason	John	Jackson	Grayson	Carter
South Dakota	Grayson	Henry, Liam	Owen	Oliver	Logan	Carter	Jack, Lincoln	Wyatt	William	Noah, Theodore, Easton
Tennessee	William	James	Liam	Noah	Elijah	Jackson	Mason	Grayson	Oliver	Benjamin
Texas	Liam	Noah	Sebastian	Mateo	Elijah	Daniel	Jacob	Ethan	Matthew	Alexander
Utah	Oliver	William	Liam	James	Henry	Jack	Owen	Benjamin	Noah	Jackson
Vermont	Oliver	Liam	Owen	Levi	Benjamin, Lucas, Mason, Noah	Jackson	Henry, Theodore	William, Wyatt	Grayson, Jacob	Colton
Virginia	William	Liam	Noah	James	Alexander, Lucas	Benjamin	Elijah	Jacob, Mason	Oliver	Jackson
Washington	Liam	Oliver	William	Noah	Henry	Alexander	Benjamin	Elijah	Logan	James
West Virginia	Mason	Liam	Elijah	Grayson	Owen	Jaxon, Lincoln	Easton	Lucas	Noah, Wyatt	Carter, Maverick
Wisconsin	Oliver	Liam	Henry	William	Logan	Owen	Noah	Jackson	Jack	Mason
Wyoming	Oliver	Logan	Jackson	Lincoln, Wyatt	William	Carter, Owen	Lucas	Alexander, Theodore	Jack	Grayson, Ryker, Thomas

Female names
Region	No. 1	No. 2	No. 3	No. 4	No. 5	No. 6	No. 7	No. 8	No. 9	No. 10
Alabama	Ava	Olivia	Harper	Emma	Amelia	Elizabeth	Isabella	Charlotte	Abigail	Ella
Alaska	Aurora	Amelia	Charlotte	Olivia	Sophia	Emma	Evelyn	Harper	Mia	Ava
Arizona	Emma	Olivia	Isabella, Mia	Sophia	Mila	Camila	Charlotte	Amelia	Emily	Evelyn
Arkansas	Ava	Olivia	Emma	Amelia	Harper	Elizabeth	Charlotte, Sophia	Isabella	Ella	Abigail
California	Emma	Mia	Olivia	Isabella	Sophia	Camila	Sofia	Emily	Victoria	Luna
Colorado	Olivia	Emma	Charlotte	Evelyn	Isabella, Sophia	Ava	Mia	Harper	Abigail	Amelia
Connecticut	Olivia	Emma	Isabella	Charlotte	Ava	Sophia	Mia	Amelia	Abigail	Ella
Delaware	Ava	Isabella	Charlotte, Olivia	Emma	Harper	Amelia, Mia	Avery	Ella, Layla	Aria, Nora	Abigail, Emily, Evelyn, Lillian
District of Columbia	Ava	Olivia	Elizabeth	Emma	Charlotte	Eleanor, Sophia	Isabella	Naomi, Nora	Abigail, Ella	Chloe, Sofia
Florida	Isabella	Emma	Olivia	Sophia	Mia	Ava	Amelia	Charlotte	Mila	Victoria
Georgia	Ava	Olivia	Emma	Amelia	Isabella	Charlotte	Harper	Sophia	Elizabeth	Abigail
Hawaii	Emma	Isabella	Aria	Mila	Olivia	Mia	Ava	Sophia	Charlotte	Ella
Idaho	Olivia	Emma	Evelyn, Harper	Charlotte	Amelia	Ava	Sophia	Hazel	Abigail	Avery, Lily
Illinois	Olivia	Emma	Ava	Isabella	Sophia	Charlotte	Mia	Amelia	Evelyn	Harper
Indiana	Emma	Olivia	Amelia	Charlotte	Ava	Harper	Sophia	Evelyn	Isabella	Mia
Iowa	Harper	Evelyn	Emma	Charlotte	Olivia	Amelia	Sophia	Ava	Isabella	Nora
Kansas	Olivia	Emma	Charlotte	Evelyn	Ava	Harper	Sophia	Elizabeth	Amelia	Abigail
Kentucky	Emma	Olivia	Ava	Harper	Amelia	Charlotte	Sophia	Evelyn	Avery, Ella, Isabella	Abigail, Madison
Louisiana	Ava	Olivia	Emma	Amelia	Harper	Avery	Charlotte	Sophia	Isabella	Lillian
Maine	Charlotte	Amelia	Harper	Emma	Olivia	Evelyn	Sophia	Ava, Avery	Piper	Ella
Maryland	Ava	Olivia	Charlotte	Emma	Sophia	Isabella	Mia	Harper	Amelia	Evelyn
Massachusetts	Emma	Olivia	Sophia	Charlotte	Isabella	Ava	Amelia	Mia	Evelyn	Emily
Michigan	Olivia	Ava	Emma	Charlotte	Amelia	Harper	Sophia	Evelyn	Isabella	Ella
Minnesota	Evelyn	Olivia	Charlotte	Emma	Harper	Amelia	Ava	Nora	Sophia	Hazel
Mississippi	Ava	Emma, Olivia	Amelia	Skylar	Isabella	Harper	Avery	Paisley	Addison, Brooklyn	Mary
Missouri	Olivia	Emma	Charlotte	Harper	Ava	Amelia	Evelyn	Sophia	Isabella	Elizabeth
Montana	Harper	Olivia	Emma	Charlotte	Abigail, Ava	Amelia	Aurora	Hazel	Nora	Evelyn
Nebraska	Olivia	Emma	Evelyn	Charlotte	Harper	Amelia	Ava	Sophia	Scarlett	Isabella
Nevada	Emma	Isabella	Olivia	Sophia	Ava	Mia	Amelia	Camila, Mila	Luna	Charlotte
New Hampshire	Olivia	Charlotte	Emma	Ava	Harper	Amelia, Evelyn	Isabella	Sophia	Avery	Ella
New Jersey	Emma	Isabella, Olivia	Mia	Ava	Sophia	Charlotte	Emily	Amelia	Leah	Abigail
New Mexico	Isabella	Mia, Sophia	Emma	Olivia	Sofia	Ava	Amelia	Camila	Aria	Mila
New York	Emma	Olivia	Isabella	Sophia	Mia	Ava	Charlotte	Amelia	Leah	Abigail
North Carolina	Ava	Emma	Olivia	Charlotte	Harper	Isabella	Amelia	Abigail	Sophia	Elizabeth
North Dakota	Olivia	Emma	Harper	Charlotte	Amelia	Evelyn	Ava, Ella	Nora	Aria	Avery, Hazel
Ohio	Ava	Emma	Olivia	Amelia	Harper	Charlotte	Sophia	Evelyn	Isabella	Avery
Oklahoma	Emma	Olivia	Ava	Isabella	Harper	Sophia	Amelia	Charlotte	Abigail	Mia
Oregon	Emma	Olivia	Evelyn	Charlotte	Amelia	Harper	Sophia	Ava	Abigail, Elizabeth	Mia
Pennsylvania	Emma	Olivia	Ava	Charlotte	Sophia	Isabella	Harper	Amelia	Mia	Ella
Rhode Island	Amelia, Olivia	Emma	Sophia	Mia	Isabella	Charlotte	Grace	Avery	Ava	Ella
South Carolina	Ava	Olivia	Emma	Charlotte	Harper	Amelia	Sophia	Isabella	Skylar	Elizabeth
South Dakota	Harper	Emma	Olivia	Charlotte	Ava	Nora	Evelyn	Avery	Elizabeth	Amelia
Tennessee	Emma	Ava	Olivia	Harper	Amelia	Charlotte	Elizabeth, Isabella	Evelyn	Abigail	Sophia
Texas	Emma	Isabella	Olivia	Mia	Sophia	Camila	Ava	Sofia	Victoria	Evelyn
Utah	Olivia	Charlotte	Emma	Evelyn, Lucy	Amelia	Harper	Ava	Lily	Sophia	Abigail, Claire
Vermont	Harper	Charlotte, Evelyn	Emma, Nora	Amelia, Olivia, Sophia	Ella, Lucy	Ava, Natalie	Aria	Adeline, Grace	Eleanor, Lillian, Zoe	Alice, Layla, Scarlett, Willow
Virginia	Ava	Olivia	Emma	Charlotte	Sophia	Isabella	Amelia	Abigail	Harper	Evelyn
Washington	Olivia	Emma	Evelyn	Amelia	Charlotte	Isabella, Sophia	Ava	Mia	Harper	Abigail
West Virginia	Emma	Olivia	Ava	Harper	Amelia	Isabella	Paisley	Willow	Ella, Sophia	Abigail
Wisconsin	Evelyn	Emma	Olivia	Harper	Charlotte	Amelia	Ava	Sophia	Nora	Grace
Wyoming	Amelia, Emma	Elizabeth	Harper	Olivia	Evelyn	Ava, Cora, Ellie	Charlotte	Claire, Emersyn	Abigail, Hazel, Mia, Sophia	Riley

== 2019 ==
Male names
Region	No. 1	No. 2	No. 3	No. 4	No. 5	No. 6	No. 7	No. 8	No. 9	No. 10
Alabama	William	James	John	Elijah	Noah	Liam	Jackson	Mason	Oliver	Grayson
Alaska	Liam	Oliver	Henry, James	Noah	William	Logan	Gabriel, Jackson	Samuel	Asher, Jack, Owen, Theodore, Wyatt	Jacob
Arizona	Liam	Noah	Sebastian	Elijah	Mateo	Oliver	Benjamin	Daniel	Alexander	Julian
Arkansas	William	Noah	Elijah	Liam	Oliver	James	Mason	Wyatt	Asher	Samuel
California	Noah	Liam	Mateo	Sebastian	Ethan	Julian	Alexander	Benjamin	Daniel	Lucas
Colorado	Liam	Oliver	Noah	William	Henry	Jack	Benjamin	James	Elijah	Jackson
Connecticut	Liam	Noah	Mason	Lucas	James, Logan	Ethan	William	Jacob, Oliver	Henry	Jack, Michael
Delaware	Noah	Liam	Benjamin	Mason	Colton, Jackson	Anthony	James, John	Carter, William	Daniel, Lucas	Jayden, Owen
District of Columbia	William	James	Noah	Benjamin, Henry	Theodore	Jack, John	Alexander	Liam	Oliver, Sebastian	Ethan
Florida	Liam	Noah	Elijah	Lucas	Alexander	Benjamin	Sebastian	Ethan, Matthew	Michael	Jacob
Georgia	Liam	William	Noah	Elijah	James	Aiden	John	Mason	Jackson	Carter
Hawaii	Noah	Liam	Mason	Elijah	Ezekiel	Lucas	Ethan	Kai	Logan, Luke	James
Idaho	Oliver	Liam	Henry, William	Noah	Benjamin	Owen	James	Jack	Lincoln	Elijah
Illinois	Noah	Liam	Benjamin	Oliver	Alexander	Mateo	William	Henry	James	Jack
Indiana	Liam	Oliver	Noah	Elijah	Benjamin	Lincoln	James	William	Henry	Mason
Iowa	Oliver	Liam	Henry	William	Noah	Lincoln	Owen	Jack	Jackson	Theodore
Kansas	Liam	Oliver	Henry	Noah	James	William	Jackson	Theodore	Elijah	Benjamin
Kentucky	Liam	William	Elijah	Noah	James	Lincoln	Grayson	Oliver	John	Benjamin
Louisiana	Noah	Elijah	Liam	James	William	John	Mason	Luke	Levi	Michael
Maine	Oliver	William	Owen	Henry	Liam	Benjamin	Lincoln	Mason	Jackson	Lucas
Maryland	Liam	Noah	James	Jacob	Benjamin	Ethan	Daniel, Lucas	Michael	Logan	William
Massachusetts	Benjamin	Noah	Liam	William	James, Lucas	Jack	Henry	Jacob	John	Ethan
Michigan	Liam, Noah	Oliver	Elijah	Henry	Lucas	Jack	Benjamin, James	William	Lincoln, Owen	Carter
Minnesota	Henry	Oliver	William	Theodore	Liam	Jack	Owen	Noah	James	Leo
Mississippi	William	Noah	James	Elijah	John	Liam	Mason	Aiden	Grayson	Michael
Missouri	Liam	Oliver	William	Henry	Elijah	Noah	James	Benjamin	Owen	Mason
Montana	Oliver	Henry, James, William	Owen	Liam	Benjamin	Jack, Jackson	Carter. Mason, Samuel, Theodore	Grayson, Lucas	Thomas	Wyatt
Nebraska	Oliver	Liam	Henry	William	Benjamin	Noah	Wyatt	Jack	Leo	Carter
Nevada	Liam	Noah	Oliver	Sebastian	Alexander	Julian	Mason	Mateo	Elijah	Benjamin
New Hampshire	Benjamin	Liam	Owen	Oliver	Henry, Theodore	William	Wyatt	Jackson	Logan	Lucas
New Jersey	Liam	Noah	Lucas	Joseph	Matthew	Michael	Jacob	James	Daniel	Benjamin
New Mexico	Liam	Noah	Mateo	Elijah	Ezekiel, Sebastian	Ezra, Logan	Daniel	Santiago	Oliver	Michael
New York	Liam	Noah	Lucas	Jacob	Michael	Ethan	Joseph	James	Matthew	Alexander
North Carolina	Liam	Noah	William	James	Elijah	Mason	Jackson	Oliver	Grayson	Lucas
North Dakota	Liam	Owen	Oliver	Henry, William	Carter, Jack	James, Wyatt	Noah	Easton	Logan	Asher, Maverick
Ohio	Liam	Oliver	Noah	William	James	Owen	Lincoln	Elijah	Benjamin, Jackson	Carter
Oklahoma	Liam	Noah	Oliver	Elijah	William, Wyatt	Jaxon	Lincoln	Jackson	Mason	James
Oregon	Oliver	Liam	Henry	Benjamin	Noah	William	Mason	Lucas	Samuel	Logan
Pennsylvania	Liam	Noah	Benjamin	Lucas	Mason	James	Logan	Oliver	John	Michael
Rhode Island	Noah	Lucas	Julian, Liam	Oliver	Benjamin	Jackson, Logan	Alexander, Matthew	Jacob, Michael, William	James	Elijah
South Carolina	William	Noah	Liam	James	Elijah	John	Jackson	Mason	Carter	Michael
South Dakota	Liam	Oliver	Wyatt	Asher	Lincoln	Hudson	Logan	Elijah, Owen	Cooper, Jack, Noah	Theodore
Tennessee	William	Liam	Noah	Elijah	James	Mason	Oliver	John	Wyatt	Jackson
Texas	Liam	Noah	Mateo	Elijah	Sebastian	Daniel	Santiago	Julian	Ethan	Jacob
Utah	Oliver	Liam	William	Henry	Jack, James	Owen	Lincoln	Benjamin	Noah	Hudson
Vermont	Oliver	Henry	Liam	Owen	Wyatt	Benjamin	John	Jackson, Levi	Emmett, Mason	Theodore
Virginia	Liam	William	Noah	James	Lucas	Elijah	Oliver	Jackson	Benjamin	Henry
Washington	Liam	Oliver	Noah	Benjamin	Henry	William	Elijah	Ethan	James	Theodore
West Virginia	Liam	Carter	Mason	Easton, Oliver	Jackson	Noah	Elijah, Jaxon, Wyatt	William	Braxton	Grayson, Owen, Waylon
Wisconsin	Oliver	Liam	Henry, Owen	Noah	William	James	Jackson	Theodore	Jack, Mason	Lincoln
Wyoming	Liam	Oliver	Henry	Asher	William	Theodore	Ryker	Carter, Elijah, James	Noah	Jackson, Wyatt

Female names
Region	No. 1	No. 2	No. 3	No. 4	No. 5	No. 6	No. 7	No. 8	No. 9	No. 10
Alabama	Ava	Olivia	Emma	Amelia	Harper	Charlotte	Elizabeth	Ella	Isabella, Mary	Abigail
Alaska	Emma, Evelyn	Amelia, Ava	Olivia	Aurora	Charlotte	Abigail	Elizabeth	Harper	Isabella	Isla
Arizona	Olivia	Emma	Sophia	Isabella	Mia	Luna	Ava	Camila	Charlotte	Evelyn
Arkansas	Olivia	Ava	Emma	Amelia	Harper	Isabella, Sophia	Paisley	Evelyn	Abigail	Mia
California	Olivia	Emma	Mia	Sophia	Camila	Isabella	Luna	Emily	Ava	Sofia
Colorado	Charlotte	Olivia	Emma	Sophia	Ava	Evelyn	Isabella	Harper	Amelia	Mia
Connecticut	Olivia	Emma	Charlotte	Mia	Sophia	Amelia	Isabella	Ava	Ella	Harper
Delaware	Emma	Olivia	Charlotte	Ava	Sophia	Isabella	Harper	Abigail	Emily	Layla, Mia, Nova
District of Columbia	Olivia	Charlotte	Elizabeth	Emma	Ava	Eleanor, Maya	Zoe	Grace, Sophia	Abigail, Aria, Caroline	Mia
Florida	Emma	Isabella	Olivia	Sophia	Mia	Ava	Amelia	Charlotte	Luna	Emily
Georgia	Ava	Olivia	Emma	Isabella	Charlotte	Amelia	Harper	Abigail	Mia, Sophia	Elizabeth, Evelyn
Hawaii	Olivia	Amelia, Ava, Emma	Aria	Mila	Isabella	Sophia	Mila	Ella, Luna	Ellie	Chloe
Idaho	Emma, Olivia	Charlotte	Evelyn	Amelia	Harper	Hazel	Ava	Sophia	Abigail	Avery, Paisley
Illinois	Olivia	Emma	Sophia	Ava	Charlotte	Amelia	Mia	Isabella	Evelyn	Sofia
Indiana	Olivia	Amelia	Ava, Emma	Charlotte	Harper	Evelyn	Sophia	Isabella	Eleanor	Mia
Iowa	Charlotte	Emma	Evelyn	Harper	Olivia	Amelia	Ava	Avery, Hazel, Nora	Mia, Violet	Sophia
Kansas	Olivia	Emma	Harper	Charlotte	Evelyn	Sophia	Amelia	Ava	Isabella	Abigail
Kentucky	Amelia	Ava	Emma	Harper	Olivia	Sophia	Ella	Charlotte	Isabella	Avery, Mia
Louisiana	Olivia	Ava	Amelia	Emma	Harper	Charlotte	Sophia	Ella	Avery	Isabella
Maine	Charlotte	Amelia	Olivia	Ava	Emma, Harper	Eleanor	Evelyn	Sophia	Ella, Isabella, Nora	Lillian, Violet
Maryland	Olivia	Ava	Sophia	Emma	Charlotte	Isabella	Mia	Abigail	Amelia	Harper
Massachusetts	Olivia	Charlotte	Emma	Isabella	Sophia	Amelia	Ava	Mia	Evelyn	Abigail
Michigan	Olivia	Charlotte	Amelia	Ava	Emma	Sophia	Harper	Evelyn	Isabella	Abigail
Minnesota	Olivia	Charlotte	Evelyn	Emma	Amelia	Harper	Nora	Sophia	Ava	Eleanor
Mississippi	Ava	Olivia	Emma	Amelia	Harper	Paisley	Skylar	Ella	Mary	Elizabeth
Missouri	Olivia	Charlotte	Ava	Amelia	Emma	Evelyn	Harper	Sophia	Eleanor	Isabella
Montana	Emma	Harper	Olivia	Charlotte	Ava, Elizabeth	Evelyn	Eleanor, Nora, Paisley	Amelia, Hadley, Hazel, Scarlett	Ellie	Madison
Nebraska	Olivia	Emma	Charlotte	Amelia	Harper	Ava	Sophia	Evelyn	Nora	Isabella
Nevada	Sophia	Emma	Mia, Olivia	Isabella	Charlotte	Luna	Amelia	Avery, Sofia	Camila	Emily
New Hampshire	Charlotte	Olivia	Amelia	Harper	Emma	Evelyn	Nora	Ava	Madison	Abigail, Sophia
New Jersey	Emma	Olivia	Sophia	Mia	Isabella	Ava	Charlotte	Amelia	Emily	Madison
New Mexico	Ava	Olivia	Sophia	Mia	Isabella	Emma	Abigail, Sofia	Camila	Aria	Emily
New York	Olivia	Emma	Sophia	Isabella	Mia	Ava	Charlotte	Amelia	Leah	Emily
North Carolina	Ava	Olivia	Emma	Amelia	Charlotte	Sophia	Harper	Isabella	Evelyn	Abigail
North Dakota	Amelia	Evelyn	Harper	Emma	Olivia	Ava	Sophia	Charlotte	Nora	Everly, Isabella, Quinn
Ohio	Olivia	Ava	Charlotte	Emma	Harper	Amelia	Sophia	Evelyn	Isabella	Nora
Oklahoma	Olivia	Emma	Ava	Harper	Amelia	Evelyn	Isabella	Sophia	Mia	Charlotte
Oregon	Olivia	Emma	Charlotte, Evelyn	Harper	Amelia	Sophia	Ava	Isabella	Mia	Abigail, Hazel
Pennsylvania	Olivia	Emma	Ava	Charlotte	Harper	Sophia	Amelia	Evelyn	Isabella	Mia
Rhode Island	Charlotte	Olivia	Sophia	Ava	Amelia	Emma, Isabella	Grace	Madison	Abigail	Violet
South Carolina	Olivia	Ava	Charlotte	Amelia	Emma	Isabella	Harper	Elizabeth	Sophia	Abigail
South Dakota	Emma	Harper	Ava	Charlotte	Olivia	Nora	Evelyn	Amelia	Sophia	Ella
Tennessee	Ava	Olivia	Harper	Emma	Amelia	Charlotte	Evelyn	Elizabeth	Isabella	Ella
Texas	Emma	Olivia	Isabella	Mia	Camila	Sophia	Ava	Sofia	Amelia	Victoria
Utah	Olivia	Emma	Charlotte	Lucy	Evelyn	Harper	Hazel	Amelia	Lily	Mia
Vermont	Harper	Amelia	Charlotte, Evelyn, Olivia	Abigail, Emma	Hazel	Isla, Willow	Isabella, Lillian	Addison, Ava	Emily, Sophia, Stella	Alice, Eleanor, Layla, Nora
Virginia	Ava	Charlotte	Olivia	Emma	Sophia	Harper	Amelia	Isabella	Mia	Evelyn
Washington	Olivia	Emma	Charlotte	Amelia	Evelyn	Sophia	Isabella	Ava	Abigail	Harper
West Virginia	Amelia, Emma	Harper, Olivia	Ava	Paisley	Willow	Abigail	Sophia	Isabella	Charlotte	Avery
Wisconsin	Olivia	Charlotte	Evelyn	Emma	Harper	Amelia	Ava	Nora	Eleanor	Violet
Wyoming	Charlotte, Olivia	Harper	Emma	Willow	Amelia, Isabella	Evelyn	Ella, Sophia	Ava, Hazel	Avery, Brooklyn, Mia	Aria, Ellie, Emily, Luna, Nova

== 2020 ==
Male names
Region	No. 1	No. 2	No. 3	No. 4	No. 5	No. 6	No. 7	No. 8	No. 9	No. 10
Alabama	William	James	John	Elijah	Noah	Liam	Mason	Oliver	Henry	Jackson
Alaska	Liam	Oliver	Elijah	Theodore	Noah, William	James	Henry	Benjamin	Levi, Lincoln, Owen	Asher, Michael
Arizona	Liam	Noah	Mateo	Oliver	Sebastian	Benjamin	Elijah	Alexander	Julian	Daniel
Arkansas	Liam	William	Elijah	Noah	Oliver	Wyatt	Jackson	Grayson	Asher	Hudson
California	Noah	Liam	Mateo	Sebastian	Julian	Ethan	Benjamin	Elijah	Alexander	Oliver
Colorado	Liam	Oliver	Noah	Henry	William	James	Theodore	Jack	Benjamin	Elijah
Connecticut	Noah	Liam	Benjamin	Michael	James	Logan, William	Jack	Lucas	Oliver	Alexander
Delaware	Liam	Noah	Elijah	Carter	Anthony	Daniel, James, Mason	Lucas, Oliver	Michael	Ethan, Leo	Alexander, William
District of Columbia	William	Noah	James, John	Henry	Theodore	Jack	Liam	Charles	Benjamin	Leo
Florida	Liam	Noah	Lucas	Elijah	Oliver	Benjamin	Ethan	Sebastian	Dylan	Daniel
Georgia	Liam	Noah	William	Elijah	James	John	Asher	Oliver	Aiden	Mason
Hawaii	Liam	Noah	Oliver	Elijah	Logan	Kai, Lucas	Aiden	Luke, Mason	Ezra, James, Levi	Ezekiel
Idaho	Oliver	Liam	Henry	William	James	Elijah	Benjamin	Lincoln	Owen	Samuel
Illinois	Noah	Liam	Oliver	Benjamin	Henry	William	James	Mateo	Alexander	Michael
Indiana	Oliver	Liam	Elijah	Noah	Henry	Lincoln	William	James	Benjamin	Owen
Iowa	Oliver	Liam	Theodore	Henry	William	Noah	Jack	Owen	Maverick	Lincoln
Kansas	Liam	Henry	Oliver	Noah	Elijah	Wyatt	William	Benjamin	James	Hudson, Theodore
Kentucky	Liam	William	Oliver	Elijah	James	Noah	Lincoln	Levi	Hudson, Jackson	Henry
Louisiana	Liam	Elijah	Noah	William	John	James	Wyatt	Levi, Oliver	Grayson	Mason
Maine	Oliver	Henry	Liam	Theodore	Jack	Owen	Lucas	Jackson, Noah	Benjamin	Wyatt
Maryland	Liam	Noah	James	Lucas	Benjamin	William	Ethan	Daniel	Oliver	Elijah
Massachusetts	Noah	Liam	Benjamin	James	William	Lucas	Henry	Oliver	Jack	Theodore
Michigan	Oliver	Noah	Liam	Henry	Benjamin, Elijah	William	James	Owen	Lucas	Jack
Minnesota	Henry	Oliver	Theodore	Liam	Jack	William	Owen	Noah	James	Benjamin
Mississippi	James	William	Elijah	John	Noah	Mason	Kingston	Liam	Asher	Grayson
Missouri	Oliver	Liam	William	Henry	Noah	Elijah	Theodore	Benjamin	James	Wyatt
Montana	Oliver	Henry	Wyatt	William	James	Jack	Liam	Owen	Hudson, Theodore	Michael, Noah
Nebraska	Oliver	Henry	Liam	Theodore	William	Noah	Elijah	Jack	Leo, Owen	Brooks
Nevada	Liam	Noah	Elijah	Sebastian	Alexander, Mateo	Oliver	Michael	Lucas	Julian	Daniel
New Hampshire	Lucas, Oliver	Benjamin, Owen	Jack	Liam, William	Henry	Jackson	Levi, Theodore	Logan	Lincoln	Wyatt
New Jersey	Liam	Noah	Lucas	Joseph	Jacob	Michael	Benjamin	Matthew	James	Logan
New Mexico	Liam	Noah	Ezekiel	Elijah	Mateo	Santiago	Daniel	Gabriel, Sebastian	Levi, Lucas	Aiden
New York	Liam	Noah	Lucas	Jacob	Joseph	Ethan	Michael	Benjamin	James	Alexander
North Carolina	Liam	Noah	William	James	Elijah	Oliver	Henry	Jackson	Mason	Levi
North Dakota	Oliver	Liam	Hudson	Asher	Noah	Benjamin, Jack, Theodore	Henry, Lincoln	James, Maverick	Elijah	Jackson
Ohio	Liam	Oliver	Noah	Elijah	William	James	Henry	Owen	Benjamin	Mason
Oklahoma	Liam	Oliver	Elijah	Noah	Lincoln	William	James, Mason	Asher	Wyatt	Alexander
Oregon	Oliver	Henry, Liam	Noah	William	Theodore	Benjamin	Jack	James	Elijah	Ezra
Pennsylvania	Noah	Liam	Benjamin	Michael	Mason	Lucas	James	Owen	Oliver	William
Rhode Island	Liam	Noah	Jacob	Benjamin, Julian	Oliver	Elijah	Lucas, Mason	James	Jack	William
South Carolina	William	Noah	James	Liam	Elijah	Mason	John	Jackson	Oliver	Lucas
South Dakota	Oliver	Liam	Henry	Maverick	Asher	Noah	Theodore	Jack, William	Levi	Hudson
Tennessee	Liam	William	Elijah	James	Noah	Oliver	Henry	Levi	Grayson	John
Texas	Liam	Noah	Mateo	Elijah	Sebastian	Oliver	Daniel	Santiago	Benjamin	Alexander
Utah	Oliver	William	Liam	Jack	Henry	Lincoln	James	Noah	Owen	Benjamin
Vermont	Oliver	Theodore	Owen	Benjamin, Liam	Wyatt	Henry	Jackson	William	Hudson	Levi, Lincoln, Noah
Virginia	Liam	Noah	William	James	Oliver	Elijah	Henry	Lucas	Jackson	Benjamin, Mason
Washington	Oliver	Liam	Noah	Benjamin	Henry	Elijah	Theodore	William	Lucas	James
West Virginia	Liam	Elijah	Mason	Noah	Asher	William, Wyatt	Waylon	Grayson, Owen	Lincoln	Oliver
Wisconsin	Oliver	Liam	Henry	William	Theodore	Jack, Mason	Levi	Owen	Noah	Jackson
Wyoming	Oliver	Liam	Wyatt	Logan	Jackson	Henry	Luke	Asher, Levi	Jack, William	Carter, Cooper, Owen

Female names
Region	No. 1	No. 2	No. 3	No. 4	No. 5	No. 6	No. 7	No. 8	No. 9	No. 10
Alabama	Ava	Olivia	Emma	Charlotte	Amelia, Harper	Elizabeth	Evelyn	Paisley	Isabella	Mary
Alaska	Amelia	Charlotte	Olivia	Aurora	Sophia	Ava	Emma	Evelyn	Abigail, Eleanor, Scarlett	Hazel
Arizona	Olivia	Emma	Sophia	Mia	Isabella	Amelia	Camila	Charlotte	Ava	Luna
Arkansas	Olivia	Emma	Amelia	Harper	Ava	Charlotte	Sophia	Paisley	Isabella	Avery
California	Olivia	Camila	Emma	Mia	Sophia	Isabella	Gianna	Luna	Sofia	Amelia
Colorado	Olivia	Charlotte	Emma	Sophia	Amelia	Evelyn	Isabella	Ava	Mia	Harper
Connecticut	Olivia	Charlotte	Emma	Sophia	Isabella	Mia	Ava	Amelia	Ella	Gianna
Delaware	Charlotte	Olivia	Isabella	Amelia	Emma	Ava	Mia	Gianna	Harper, Sophia	Layla
District of Columbia	Olivia	Ava	Charlotte	Emma	Eleanor	Maya	Elizabeth	Isabella	Evelyn	Nora, Sofia, Sophia
Florida	Emma	Olivia	Isabella	Sophia	Ava	Mia	Amelia	Charlotte	Gianna	Luna
Georgia	Ava	Olivia	Amelia	Emma	Charlotte	Sophia	Isabella	Harper	Evelyn	Elizabeth
Hawaii	Olivia	Sophia	Isabella	Amelia, Luna	Ava	Mila	Emma, Mia	Charlotte, Isla	Aria	Madison
Idaho	Olivia	Charlotte	Emma	Harper	Evelyn	Amelia	Sophia	Hazel	Abigail, Ellie	Ava, Eleanor
Illinois	Olivia	Emma	Charlotte	Sophia	Amelia	Ava	Isabella	Evelyn	Mia	Camila
Indiana	Charlotte, Olivia	Emma	Amelia	Ava	Sophia	Evelyn	Harper	Isabella	Eleanor	Nora
Iowa	Olivia	Charlotte	Evelyn	Emma	Amelia	Ava	Harper	Sophia	Hazel	Eleanor
Kansas	Olivia	Charlotte	Emma	Sophia	Amelia	Evelyn	Ava	Isabella	Eleanor	Harper
Kentucky	Amelia	Olivia	Emma	Ava	Harper	Charlotte	Isabella	Paisley	Sophia	Evelyn
Louisiana	Ava	Amelia	Olivia	Emma	Charlotte, Harper	Ella	Isabella, Sophia	Evelyn, Mia	Avery	Caroline
Maine	Charlotte	Olivia	Harper	Evelyn	Emma	Amelia	Ava	Sophia	Willow	Eleanor
Maryland	Olivia	Ava	Emma	Sophia	Charlotte	Isabella	Mia	Amelia	Abigail	Grace
Massachusetts	Olivia	Charlotte	Emma	Sophia	Isabella	Amelia	Mia	Ava	Ella	Grace
Michigan	Charlotte	Amelia	Olivia	Ava	Emma	Evelyn	Sophia	Harper	Isabella	Nora
Minnesota	Olivia	Charlotte	Emma	Evelyn	Amelia	Ava	Eleanor	Hazel	Harper	Sophia
Mississippi	Ava	Olivia	Amelia	Kinsley	Harper	Charlotte, Elizabeth, Emma	Paisley	Avery	Mary	Ella, Skylar
Missouri	Olivia	Amelia, Charlotte	Emma	Harper	Ava	Evelyn	Sophia	Eleanor	Isabella	Nora
Montana	Charlotte, Olivia	Evelyn	Nora	Harper	Emma	Amelia, Eleanor	Hazel	Madison	Willow	Ava, Paisley
Nebraska	Olivia	Amelia	Charlotte	Emma	Evelyn, Harper	Ava	Eleanor	Nora, Sophia	Hazel	Mia
Nevada	Olivia	Emma	Isabella	Sophia	Mia	Charlotte	Camila	Gianna	Luna	Ava
New Hampshire	Charlotte	Olivia	Amelia, Emma	Ava	Evelyn	Madison	Abigail, Harper	Isabella	Scarlett, Sophia	Eleanor
New Jersey	Olivia	Sophia	Emma	Mia	Ava	Charlotte	Amelia	Isabella	Gianna	Abigail
New Mexico	Olivia	Sophia	Emma	Mia	Amelia	Isabella	Aria	Camila	Luna	Sofia
New York	Olivia	Emma	Sophia	Ava, Isabella	Mia	Charlotte	Amelia	Leah	Gianna	Ella
North Carolina	Olivia	Ava	Emma	Charlotte	Amelia	Sophia	Harper	Isabella	Evelyn	Mia
North Dakota	Hazel	Amelia, Olivia	Ava	Emma, Evelyn	Eleanor, Harper	Charlotte	Ellie, Quinn	Everly	Aurora, Ella, Lydia, Sophia	Ivy
Ohio	Olivia	Charlotte	Amelia	Ava	Emma	Sophia	Evelyn	Harper	Isabella	Eleanor
Oklahoma	Olivia	Emma	Ava	Amelia	Charlotte	Harper	Isabella	Evelyn	Sophia	Mia
Oregon	Olivia	Amelia	Charlotte	Emma	Evelyn	Eleanor	Isabella, Sophia	Harper	Ava	Abigail, Luna
Pennsylvania	Emma	Olivia	Charlotte	Ava	Sophia	Amelia	Harper	Isabella	Evelyn	Mia
Rhode Island	Olivia	Charlotte	Emma	Isabella	Amelia	Ava	Mia	Sophia	Avery	Mila
South Carolina	Ava	Olivia	Charlotte	Emma	Amelia	Harper	Isabella	Elizabeth	Sophia	Evelyn
South Dakota	Harper	Charlotte	Amelia	Emma	Ella, Olivia	Ava	Evelyn	Nora	Sophia	Elizabeth, Quinn
Tennessee	Olivia	Ava	Amelia	Emma	Harper	Charlotte	Evelyn	Isabella	Sophia	Eleanor, Elizabeth
Texas	Olivia	Emma	Camila	Isabella	Mia	Sophia	Ava	Amelia	Sofia	Charlotte
Utah	Olivia	Emma	Charlotte	Amelia	Evelyn	Lucy	Hazel	Harper	Ellie	Ava
Vermont	Amelia	Emma	Olivia	Eleanor	Evelyn, Isla, Lily	Charlotte, Ella, Harper, Hazel, Josephine, Lillian	Ava, Luna, Sophia	Chloe, Elizabeth, Violet	Ellie, Willow	Aria, Aurora, Paisley
Virginia	Charlotte	Olivia	Ava	Emma	Amelia	Sophia	Isabella	Harper	Elizabeth	Evelyn
Washington	Olivia	Emma	Charlotte	Amelia	Sophia	Evelyn	Ava	Mia	Hazel	Isabella
West Virginia	Harper	Amelia, Ava	Emma	Olivia, Paisley	Evelyn	Willow	Charlotte	Sophia	Ellie	Isabella
Wisconsin	Charlotte	Olivia	Evelyn	Amelia	Emma	Ava	Sophia	Harper	Nora	Eleanor
Wyoming	Olivia	Amelia	Harper	Charlotte, Evelyn, Paisley	Emma, Mia	Ella, Sophia	Addison, Ember, Isla, Ruby	Hazel, Lily, Nora, Oakley	Ava, Emily	Avery, Claire, Clara, Elizabeth, Everleigh, Millie, Stella, Zoey

== 2021 ==
Male names
Region	No. 1	No. 2	No. 3	No. 4	No. 5	No. 6	No. 7	No. 8	No. 9	No. 10
Alabama	William	John	James	Noah	Elijah	Liam	Asher	Henry	Oliver	Grayson
Alaska	Noah, Oliver	Liam	James, Wyatt	William	Lucas	Elias, Maverick, Michael, Owen, Theodore	Benjamin, Elijah	Jackson	Thomas	John, Levi
Arizona	Liam	Noah	Mateo	Oliver	Sebastian	Elijah	Benjamin	Julian	Santiago	Alexander
Arkansas	Oliver	Liam	Elijah	Noah	Asher	William	James	Hudson	Wyatt	Grayson, Luke
California	Noah	Liam	Mateo	Sebastian	Julian	Benjamin	Oliver	Elijah	Alexander	Daniel
Colorado	Liam	Oliver	Noah	Henry	Theodore	William	Benjamin	James	Jack	Elijah
Connecticut	Noah	Liam	James	Lucas	Benjamin, Theodore	Oliver	William	Henry	Jack, Joseph	Luca
Delaware	Liam, Noah	Lucas, Michael	James	Levi	David	Jack	Joseph, Mason, Theodore	Alexander, Cameron, Luke	Elijah, Jackson, Oliver	Jaxon, Josiah, Julian, William, Wyatt
District of Columbia	Henry	William	James	Noah	Liam	Theodore	Charles	Benjamin, Leo	John	Alexander
Florida	Liam	Noah	Lucas	Elijah	Oliver	Benjamin	Ethan	Alexander	James	Daniel
Georgia	Noah	Liam	William	Elijah	James	Oliver	Asher	John	Lucas	Henry
Hawaii	Noah	Kai	Liam	Ezekiel	Oliver	Leo, Luke	Alexander, Luca, Maverick	James, Levi	Lucas	Elijah, Ezra, Mason
Idaho	Oliver	Liam	Henry	William	Jack	Asher, Wyatt	Noah	James	Jackson	Luke, Theodore
Illinois	Noah	Liam	Oliver	Henry	Benjamin	Alexander	Theodore	William	Mateo	Logan
Indiana	Liam	Oliver	Noah	Elijah	Henry	Theodore	Lincoln	James	William	Benjamin
Iowa	Oliver	Liam	Henry	Noah	Asher	Theodore	Hudson, Owen	Elijah	Jack	Brooks
Kansas	Liam	Oliver	Noah	Theodore	James, William	Henry	Wyatt	Elijah	Leo	Jack, Lucas
Kentucky	Liam	James	Elijah	William	Noah	Oliver	Waylon	Hudson	Grayson, Levi	Asher
Louisiana	Liam	Noah	Elijah	James	William	John	Levi	Asher	Oliver	Luke
Maine	Oliver	Owen, William	Henry	Jack, Jackson	Liam	Lucas, Theodore	Colton, Levi, Mason	Wyatt	Carter< Noah	Benjamin, Everett, James, Samuel
Maryland	Liam	Noah	James, Lucas	Oliver	William	Michael	Benjamin	Ethan	Dylan	Henry
Massachusetts	Noah	Liam	Henry	Benjamin, Jack	James	Oliver	Theodore	William	Lucas	Owen
Michigan	Noah	Oliver	Liam	Henry	Elijah	Benjamin	Theodore	Jack	Lucas, Owen	Levi
Minnesota	Henry, Oliver	Theodore	Liam	Owen	Jack	William	James	Noah	Leo	Benjamin
Mississippi	William	John	James	Elijah	Noah	Liam	Kingston	Asher	Mason	Grayson
Missouri	Oliver	Henry	Liam	William	Elijah	Noah	James	Benjamin	Theodore	Jack
Montana	Oliver	Liam	James	Asher	Jackson, Theodore	Benjamin	Henry	Brooks, Maverick, Noah, William, Wyatt	Ezra, Jack	Hudson
Nebraska	Henry	Oliver	Liam	Theodore	William	Owen	Jack	Brooks	Hudson, Noah	James, Lucas
Nevada	Liam	Noah	Mateo	Oliver	Sebastian	Elijah, Julian	Benjamin	Levi	Ezra	Santiago
New Hampshire	Oliver	Henry, Liam	Jackson	Benjamin	Owen	Theodore	Noah, William	Lincoln	Wyatt	Jack
New Jersey	Liam	Noah	Lucas	Joseph	Michael	Benjamin	James	Jacob	Anthony	Ethan
New Mexico	Noah	Liam	Elijah	Ezekiel	Mateo	Santiago	Sebastian	Levi, Oliver	Benjamin	Aiden, Josiah
New York	Liam	Noah	Lucas	Joseph	Jacob	James	Benjamin	Ethan	Michael	Oliver
North Carolina	Liam	Noah	William	James	Oliver	Henry	Elijah	Jackson	Lucas	Levi
North Dakota	Oliver	Liam	Theodore	Asher, Brooks	Hudson, Lincoln	Henry, Jack	Logan	Elijah, Leo, Owen, William	James, Noah	Bennett, Grayson, Jackson, Maverick
Ohio	Oliver	Liam	Noah	Henry	Lincoln	William	Elijah	Owen	Jackson	James
Oklahoma	Liam	Oliver	Noah	Elijah	William	Asher	James	Benjamin	Levi, Luke	Hudson
Oregon	Oliver	Liam	Henry	Benjamin	Lucas	Noah	Theodore	Elijah	James	William
Pennsylvania	Noah	Liam	Benjamin, Oliver	Owen	James	Logan	Henry, Lucas	Mason	Jack	Jackson
Rhode Island	Liam	Noah	Julian	Henry, Oliver	Benjamin	Lucas	Logan	Luca	John, Owen	Gabriel, Jack, Michael
South Carolina	William	James	Liam	Noah	Elijah	Oliver	Samuel	John	Mason	Asher, Henry
South Dakota	Henry	Oliver	Theodore	Hudson	Asher, Lincoln	Liam	Noah	Jack	Brooks	Maverick
Tennessee	William	Liam	James	Noah	Elijah	Oliver	Henry	Hudson	Asher	Jackson
Texas	Liam	Noah	Elijah	Mateo	Sebastian	Santiago	Oliver	Daniel	Jose	Benjamin
Utah	Oliver	Liam	Jack	William	Henry	James	Hudson	Theodore	Owen	Noah
Vermont	Henry	Oliver	Noah	Theodore	Owen	Jack, Wesley, William	Hudson	Benjamin, Jackson	Silas	Charles
Virginia	Liam	Noah	James	William	Oliver	Elijah	Henry	Lucas	Benjamin	Jackson
Washington	Liam	Noah	Oliver	Henry	Theodore	Benjamin	William	Elijah	James	Lucas
West Virginia	Liam	Waylon	Noah	Elijah	Grayson	Maverick	Mason	Asher	Lincoln, Wyatt	James
Wisconsin	Oliver	Henry	Theodore	Liam	Levi	Noah	Jack	Owen	William	Jackson
Wyoming	Oliver	Liam	Henry	Lincoln	Owen	Noah, William, Wyatt	James	Hudson, Jack	Michael	Brooks, Lucas

Female names
Region	No. 1	No. 2	No. 3	No. 4	No. 5	No. 6	No. 7	No. 8	No. 9	No. 10
Alabama	Olivia	Ava	Amelia	Charlotte	Emma	Harper	Elizabeth	Evelyn	Mary	Ella
Alaska	Amelia	Hazel, Olivia	Ava, Charlotte	Eleanor	Aurora, Emma, Evelyn	Isla, Sophia	Ellie	Abigail, Harper	Hannah	Ember, Grace
Arizona	Olivia	Emma	Sophia	Camila	Isabella	Mia	Charlotte	Amelia	Luna	Ava
Arkansas	Olivia	Emma	Amelia	Ava	Charlotte, Paisley	Harper	Evelyn	Ella	Elizabeth	Sophia
California	Olivia	Emma	Camila	Mia	Sophia	Isabella	Luna	Amelia	Sofia	Gianna
Colorado	Olivia	Emma	Charlotte	Evelyn	Amelia	Sophia	Ava	Mia	Camila	Isabella
Connecticut	Olivia	Charlotte	Emma	Amelia	Sophia	Ava	Mia	Isabella	Madison	Gianna
Delaware	Charlotte	Olivia	Amelia	Emma	Sophia	Isabella	Harper	Ava	Mia	Layla
District of Columbia	Charlotte	Ava	Maya	Sophia	Emma	Elizabeth, Zoe	Nora, Olivia	Eleanor	Mia, Naomi	Chloe, Margaret
Florida	Olivia	Emma	Isabella	Mia	Sophia	Ava	Amelia	Charlotte	Luna	Gianna
Georgia	Olivia	Ava	Amelia	Emma	Charlotte	Isabella	Sophia	Harper	Evelyn	Mia, Nova
Hawaii	Olivia	Amelia	Luna	Ava	Isla, Mia	Kaia	Aria, Sophia	Mila	Emma	Lily
Idaho	Olivia	Amelia	Emma	Harper	Evelyn	Charlotte	Hazel	Ava	Eleanor	Paisley
Illinois	Olivia	Emma	Sophia	Charlotte	Amelia	Ava	Isabella	Mia	Evelyn	Camila
Indiana	Charlotte	Amelia	Emma	Olivia	Ava	Eleanor	Evelyn	Harper	Sophia	Hazel
Iowa	Charlotte	Olivia	Amelia	Ava	Emma	Sophia	Nora	Evelyn	Harper	Willow
Kansas	Olivia	Charlotte	Amelia	Emma	Evelyn	Ava	Sophia	Eleanor, Harper	Elizabeth	Luna
Kentucky	Emma	Olivia	Amelia	Ava	Charlotte	Harper	Sophia	Willow	Evelyn	Ellie
Louisiana	Olivia	Ava	Amelia	Charlotte	Emma	Harper	Mia	Avery	Ella	Sophia
Maine	Charlotte	Olivia	Amelia, Emma	Harper	Sophia	Ava, Evelyn	Nora	Willow	Isla	Eleanor, Hazel, Scarlett
Maryland	Olivia	Charlotte	Ava	Emma	Sophia	Mia	Amelia	Isabella	Evelyn	Madison
Massachusetts	Olivia	Charlotte	Emma	Sophia	Amelia	Mia	Isabella	Ava	Evelyn	Ella
Michigan	Charlotte	Olivia	Ava	Amelia	Evelyn	Sophia	Emma	Harper	Isabella	Eleanor
Minnesota	Charlotte	Olivia	Evelyn	Emma	Nora	Amelia	Ava	Sophia	Hazel	Eleanor
Mississippi	Ava	Olivia	Amelia	Paisley	Emma	Nova	Mary	Charlotte	Avery	Elizabeth
Missouri	Olivia	Charlotte	Amelia	Ava	Emma	Harper	Sophia	Eleanor	Evelyn	Isabella
Montana	Olivia	Evelyn	Ava, Charlotte	Harper	Amelia, Emma	Hazel	Willow	Eleanor, Nora, Sophia	Elizabeth	Isla
Nebraska	Olivia	Charlotte	Evelyn	Amelia	Eleanor	Ava, Harper	Nora	Emma	Sophia	Avery, Hazel
Nevada	Olivia	Isabella	Emma	Mia	Camila	Luna	Sophia	Amelia	Charlotte	Gianna
New Hampshire	Olivia	Charlotte	Evelyn	Emma	Amelia, Nora	Eleanor	Harper, Sophia	Ava	Abigail	Isabella
New Jersey	Olivia	Emma	Mia	Ava	Sophia	Isabella	Charlotte	Amelia	Gianna	Leah
New Mexico	Mia	Sophia	Emma	Isabella	Amelia	Olivia	Ava	Luna	Camila	Charlotte
New York	Olivia	Emma	Sophia	Mia	Amelia	Ava	Charlotte	Isabella	Gianna	Leah
North Carolina	Olivia	Ava	Emma	Charlotte	Amelia	Sophia	Harper	Isabella	Evelyn	Mia
North Dakota	Olivia	Harper	Emma	Evelyn	Amelia	Charlotte	Ava	Eleanor	Aurora	Nora
Ohio	Olivia	Charlotte	Emma	Amelia	Ava	Evelyn	Sophia	Harper	Eleanor	Isabella
Oklahoma	Olivia	Amelia	Harper	Charlotte	Ava	Emma	Evelyn	Eleanor	Isabella, Sophia	Luna
Oregon	Evelyn	Olivia	Charlotte	Amelia	Sophia	Emma	Hazel	Harper	Isabella	Eleanor
Pennsylvania	Olivia	Charlotte	Emma	Ava	Sophia	Amelia	Harper	Isabella	Evelyn	Mia
Rhode Island	Olivia	Sophia	Charlotte	Amelia	Emma	Ava	Isabella	Mia	Luna, Nora	Ella
South Carolina	Olivia	Ava	Charlotte	Emma	Amelia	Harper	Evelyn	Isabella	Elizabeth	Sophia
South Dakota	Evelyn	Emma	Charlotte	Amelia	Ava	Olivia	Sophia	Ivy, Nora	Harper, Willow	Aurora, Elizabeth
Tennessee	Olivia	Charlotte	Ava	Emma	Amelia	Harper	Evelyn	Elizabeth	Sophia	Eleanor
Texas	Olivia	Emma	Camila	Isabella	Mia	Sophia	Ava	Amelia	Charlotte	Sofia
Utah	Olivia	Charlotte	Emma	Evelyn	Hazel	Eleanor	Lucy	Amelia	Lily	Mia
Vermont	Charlotte	Emma	Nora	Isla	Olivia	Eleanor	Aurora, Avery, Sophia	Amelia, Harper, Maeve, Quinn	Addison, Chloe, Evelyn	Eloise, Juniper, Lydia, Natalie, Penelope, Peyton, Scarlett
Virginia	Charlotte	Olivia	Emma	Ava	Sophia	Amelia	Isabella	Elizabeth	Evelyn	Mia
Washington	Olivia	Amelia	Emma	Charlotte	Sophia	Evelyn	Harper	Isabella	Eleanor	Ava
West Virginia	Amelia	Harper	Paisley	Willow	Emma	Ava	Isabella	Olivia	Kinsley, Sophia	Ellie
Wisconsin	Charlotte	Olivia	Emma	Evelyn	Ava	Amelia	Harper	Eleanor	Nora	Sophia
Wyoming	Olivia	Charlotte	Amelia	Emma, Evelyn, Harper	Sophia	Ava, Elizabeth, Lucy, Madison	Emery	Everly, Juniper, Scarlett, Violet	Aurora, Claire, Lillian, Stella, Wren	Allison, Aspen, Ember, Emily, Lily, Willow

== 2022 ==
Male names
Region	No. 1	No. 2	No. 3	No. 4	No. 5	No. 6	No. 7	No. 8	No. 9	No. 10
Alabama	William	James	John	Noah	Liam	Elijah	Oliver	Jackson	Grayson	Samuel
Alaska	Oliver	Liam	James	Theodore	Lucas	William	Elijah, Ezra, Noah	Jack, John, Levi, Maverick	Asher, Henry	Benjamin, Hudson
Arizona	Liam	Noah	Mateo	Oliver	Santiago	Sebastian	Elijah	Ezra	Ezekiel, Julian	Benjamin
Arkansas	Oliver	Elijah	Liam, Noah	William	Asher	Hudson	James	John	Levi	Henry
California	Liam	Noah	Mateo	Sebastian	Oliver	Julian	Santiago	Benjamin	Elijah	Ezekiel
Colorado	Oliver	Liam	Theodore	Noah	Henry	William	James	Jack	Mateo	Elijah
Connecticut	Liam	Noah	Jack	Michael	Luca	James, Lucas, Theodore	Oliver	Benjamin	William	Logan
Delaware	Liam	Noah	Michael	James, William	Logan, Lucas	Benjamin	Jack, Owen	Ethan	Jacob	Luca
District of Columbia	Henry	Theodore	Liam	Charles, James, William	Noah	Alexander	John	Jack	Oliver, Samuel	Benjamin, Miles
Florida	Liam	Noah	Lucas	Elijah	Oliver	Dylan	Mateo	Benjamin	Sebastian	Michael
Georgia	Noah	Liam	William	Elijah	James	Oliver	John	Henry	Samuel	Asher
Hawaii	Noah	Liam	Kai	Asher	Ethan	Oliver	Maverick	Ezekiel	Ezra	Aiden, Isaiah, Theodore
Idaho	Oliver	Liam	Henry	James	William	Theodore	Wyatt	Asher, Levi	Jackson	Elijah, Noah
Illinois	Noah	Liam	Oliver	Mateo	Theodore	Benjamin	Henry	James	William	Sebastian
Indiana	Oliver	Liam	Theodore	Henry	Noah	Elijah	Hudson	Asher	Levi	Lincoln
Iowa	Oliver	Liam	Theodore	Henry	William	Hudson, James	Jack	Leo	Owen	Asher, Brooks
Kansas	Liam	Oliver	Henry	Theodore	Noah	James	Elijah	Asher	Hudson	William
Kentucky	Liam	Noah	Oliver	William	Asher	Elijah	Waylon	James	Levi	Hudson
Louisiana	Liam	Elijah	Noah	Luke	James	John, Levi	William	Oliver	Asher	Grayson
Maine	Oliver	Theodore	Henry	Owen	Jackson	William	Noah	Jack, Liam	Carter	Wesley
Maryland	Liam	Noah	James	Lucas	Oliver	William	Ethan	Henry, Jacob	Caleb	David
Massachusetts	Noah	Liam	James	Theodore	Benjamin	Henry	Jack, Oliver	Lucas	William	Owen
Michigan	Noah	Oliver	Theodore	Henry	Liam	Elijah	Levi	Benjamin, Lucas	Hudson	William
Minnesota	Oliver	Henry	Theodore	Liam	James	Jack	Owen	Leo	Hudson	Noah
Mississippi	James	John	Elijah	Noah, William	Asher	Liam	Waylon	Kingston	Michael, Samuel	Mason
Missouri	Oliver	Theodore	Henry	Liam	William	Noah	Elijah	James	Hudson	Benjamin
Montana	William	Henry	Theodore	Noah, Oliver	Hudson, James	Liam, Owen	Maverick	Wyatt	Jack	Asher
Nebraska	Oliver	Henry	Liam	Theodore	James	Owen	Noah	Jack	William	Asher, Hudson, Leo
Nevada	Liam	Noah	Mateo, Sebastian	Oliver	Elijah	Julian	Ezra	Daniel	Santiago	Benjamin
New Hampshire	Theodore	Henry, Oliver	Owen	Benjamin, William	Jack	Liam	James	Jackson	Wyatt	Noah
New Jersey	Liam	Noah	Lucas	Joseph	Michael	Jacob	Ethan	James, Luca	Jack	Daniel
New Mexico	Liam	Mateo	Noah	Ezekiel	Elijah, Santiago	Ezra	Oliver	Daniel, James	Alexander, Levi	Sebastian
New York	Liam	Noah	Lucas	Joseph	Jacob	Oliver	Ethan	Michael	David	Benjamin
North Carolina	Liam	Noah	William	Oliver	James	Elijah	Henry	Levi	Jackson	Lucas
North Dakota	Oliver	Theodore	Henry	Asher, Maverick	Hudson, William	Cooper, Noah	Leo, Liam	Brooks	James	Jack
Ohio	Oliver	Liam	Noah	Henry, Theodore	Elijah	Owen	James	William	Lincoln	Lucas
Oklahoma	Liam	Oliver	Noah	Elijah	Asher	James	Theodore	Henry, Hudson	Maverick	Levi
Oregon	Oliver	Liam	Henry, Theodore	Noah	Ezra	James	William	Samuel	Benjamin, Owen	Hudson
Pennsylvania	Liam	Noah	Oliver	Theodore	Benjamin	James	Owen	Lucas	Henry	Michael
Rhode Island	Liam	Noah	Owen	Theodore	Benjamin	James, Julian, Luca, Oliver	Lucas	Henry, Levi	Jack	Elijah, Mason
South Carolina	Noah	Liam	William	James	John	Elijah	Oliver	Henry	Charles	Asher, Jackson
South Dakota	Oliver	Hudson	William	Henry, Liam	Theodore	Noah	Asher, Brooks, James, Maverick, Owen	Levi	Jack	Wyatt
Tennessee	Liam	William	Oliver	Noah	James	Elijah	Henry	Hudson	John	Asher
Texas	Liam	Noah	Mateo	Sebastian	Santiago	Elijah	Oliver	Daniel	Jose	Levi
Utah	Oliver	Liam	William	Henry	James	Hudson	Noah	Jack	Theodore	Owen
Vermont	Henry	Oliver	Theodore	Jackson	Hudson, Levi, Liam	William	Jack, Wyatt	Everett, Leo, Lincoln	Asher, Owen	Charles, Ezra, Wesley
Virginia	Liam	Noah	James	Oliver	William	Henry	Theodore	Elijah	Levi	Lucas
Washington	Oliver	Liam	Noah	Theodore	Henry	Lucas	Benjamin	William	James	Elijah
West Virginia	Asher	Grayson	Waylon	Oliver	Liam	Maverick, Noah	Lincoln, Owen	Hudson	Elijah	William, Wyatt
Wisconsin	Henry	Oliver	Liam	Theodore	Noah	Owen	Jack	Levi	William	Leo
Wyoming	Noah	Owen	Henry, William	Hudson, Oliver, Wyatt	James, John	Benjamin, Bridger	Hunter	Asher, Beau, Brooks, Samuel, Waylon	Easton, Everett, Isaac, Lincoln, Thomas	Aiden, Alexander, Elijah, Grayson, Jackson, Liam, Lucas, Miles

Female names
Region	No. 1	No. 2	No. 3	No. 4	No. 5	No. 6	No. 7	No. 8	No. 9	No. 10
Alabama	Olivia	Charlotte	Ava	Amelia	Harper	Emma	Evelyn	Elizabeth	Mary	Nova
Alaska	Aurora, Charlotte	Amelia, Emma, Evelyn	Olivia	Penelope	Scarlett	Isabella	Isla	Sophia	Violet	Willow
Arizona	Olivia	Emma	Isabella	Sophia	Luna	Mia	Camila	Amelia	Charlotte	Ava
Arkansas	Olivia	Emma	Amelia	Charlotte	Harper	Ava	Isabella, Willow	Paisley	Evelyn, Luna	Avery
California	Olivia	Emma	Camila	Mia	Sophia	Isabella	Luna	Sofia	Amelia	Emily, Gianna
Colorado	Olivia	Emma	Charlotte	Sophia	Mia	Evelyn	Isabella	Harper	Amelia	Ava
Connecticut	Olivia	Emma	Charlotte, Isabella	Mia	Sophia	Ava	Amelia	Madison	Sofia	Gianna
Delaware	Sophia	Olivia	Charlotte	Ava	Amelia	Emma	Sofia	Mia	Gianna, Harper	Evelyn
District of Columbia	Charlotte	Ava	Olivia	Nora	Eleanor	Sophia	Chloe, Maya, Zoe	Elizabeth	Amelia, Emma	Isabella
Florida	Olivia	Isabella	Emma	Sophia	Mia	Amelia	Charlotte	Ava	Luna	Sofia
Georgia	Olivia	Ava	Charlotte	Amelia	Emma	Isabella	Harper	Sophia	Elizabeth	Nova
Hawaii	Olivia	Amelia	Luna	Aria, Sophia	Charlotte	Ava, Isabella	Lily, Mila	Emma, Kaia	Mia	Isla
Idaho	Olivia	Charlotte	Hazel	Emma	Evelyn	Amelia	Harper	Avery	Eleanor	Mia
Illinois	Olivia	Sophia	Emma	Charlotte	Amelia	Mia	Isabella	Ava	Camila	Sofia
Indiana	Charlotte	Amelia	Olivia	Emma	Ava	Eleanor	Sophia	Harper	Evelyn	Isabella
Iowa	Olivia	Charlotte	Ava	Emma	Amelia	Evelyn	Harper	Eleanor	Nora	Hazel
Kansas	Olivia	Charlotte	Amelia	Emma	Harper	Evelyn	Eleanor	Hazel	Ava, Isabella	Violet
Kentucky	Harper	Olivia	Amelia	Emma	Charlotte	Ava	Paisley	Evelyn	Isabella	Willow
Louisiana	Olivia	Amelia	Ava	Charlotte	Harper	Emma	Isabella	Mia	Avery	Evelyn
Maine	Evelyn	Charlotte	Amelia	Olivia	Harper	Eleanor	Emma	Violet	Ava	Hazel, Nora
Maryland	Ava, Olivia	Charlotte	Emma	Sophia	Mia	Isabella	Amelia	Luna	Madison	Evelyn
Massachusetts	Olivia	Charlotte	Emma	Sophia	Isabella	Amelia	Mia	Evelyn	Nora	Ava
Michigan	Charlotte	Olivia	Amelia	Ava	Sophia	Emma	Evelyn	Eleanor	Harper	Isabella
Minnesota	Charlotte	Olivia	Emma, Evelyn	Nora	Harper	Eleanor, Sophia	Violet	Ava	Amelia	Isla
Mississippi	Ava	Olivia	Amelia, Nova	Kinsley	Harper	Charlotte	Brooklyn	Elizabeth, Emma, Paisley	Isabella, Mary	Serenity
Missouri	Charlotte	Olivia	Amelia	Emma	Ava, Evelyn	Harper	Eleanor	Sophia	Violet	Willow
Montana	Olivia	Charlotte	Harper	Amelia	Emma	Evelyn, Paisley	Ava	Hazel	Lily	Elizabeth, Nora, Ruby, Sophia
Nebraska	Charlotte	Olivia	Emma	Harper	Evelyn	Hazel	Sophia	Amelia	Ava	Mia
Nevada	Olivia	Sophia	Luna	Mia	Isabella	Emma	Amelia	Camila	Charlotte	Ava
New Hampshire	Charlotte	Olivia	Evelyn	Amelia	Emma, Harper	Nora	Isla	Eleanor, Violet	Ava, Sophia	Madison, Natalie
New Jersey	Emma	Sophia	Mia	Olivia	Isabella	Charlotte	Amelia	Ava	Luna	Gianna
New Mexico	Sophia	Isabella	Mia	Emma, Olivia	Amelia	Camila	Aria	Luna	Evelyn	Aurora
New York	Olivia	Emma	Sophia	Mia	Charlotte	Isabella	Ava	Amelia	Luna	Leah
North Carolina	Olivia	Amelia	Charlotte	Ava	Emma	Sophia	Isabella	Harper, Mia	Evelyn	Eleanor
North Dakota	Olivia	Amelia	Nora	Ellie	Evelyn, Harper, Sophia	Eleanor	Aurora, Emma	Ivy	Ava, Charlotte	Elizabeth, Violet
Ohio	Charlotte	Olivia	Amelia	Sophia	Ava	Evelyn	Emma	Harper	Isabella	Eleanor
Oklahoma	Olivia	Amelia, Charlotte	Isabella	Harper	Emma	Ava, Sophia	Mia	Evelyn	Eleanor	Luna
Oregon	Olivia	Amelia	Charlotte	Evelyn	Emma	Sophia	Mia	Hazel	Aurora	Penelope
Pennsylvania	Olivia	Charlotte, Emma	Sophia	Amelia	Ava	Isabella	Harper	Evelyn	Mia	Nora
Rhode Island	Charlotte	Amelia	Isabella	Luna	Emma	Olivia	Sophia	Ava	Isla	Camila
South Carolina	Charlotte	Olivia	Amelia	Ava	Emma	Harper	Elizabeth	Isabella	Evelyn	Sophia
South Dakota	Evelyn	Harper	Amelia	Emma	Olivia	Ava, Charlotte	Hazel	Lillian, Paisley	Aurora, Avery, Elizabeth, Nora	Ivy, Rylee
Tennessee	Olivia	Amelia	Charlotte, Emma	Harper	Ava	Evelyn	Eleanor	Elizabeth	Isabella, Willow	Ellie
Texas	Olivia	Emma	Camila	Isabella	Mia	Sophia	Amelia	Sofia	Luna	Ava
Utah	Olivia	Emma	Charlotte	Amelia	Evelyn, Hazel	Lucy	Harper	Lily	Mia	Eleanor
Vermont	Amelia	Charlotte	Evelyn	Violet	Harper, Juniper	Ava, Hazel	Eleanor	Iris, Isabella, Olivia, Paisley	Chloe, Emma, Nora	Aurora, Maeve, Natalie, Phoebe
Virginia	Charlotte	Olivia	Emma	Ava	Amelia	Sophia	Harper	Isabella	Evelyn	Elizabeth
Washington	Olivia	Emma	Evelyn	Amelia	Charlotte	Sophia	Mia	Isabella	Luna	Ava
West Virginia	Amelia	Olivia	Sophia, Willow	Ava, Harper	Emma	Charlotte	Paisley, Scarlett	Oaklynn	Isabella	Ellie, Evelyn
Wisconsin	Charlotte	Olivia	Evelyn	Amelia	Emma	Nora	Sophia	Eleanor	Harper	Hazel
Wyoming	Charlotte	Olivia	Emma, Hazel	Evelyn	Harper, Isabella	Amelia	Nova, Sophia	Paisley	Aubrey, Aurora, Avery, Ruby, Scarlett, Zoey	Eleanor, Lillian

== 2023 ==
Male names
Region	No. 1	No. 2	No. 3	No. 4	No. 5	No. 6	No. 7	No. 8	No. 9	No. 10
Alabama	William	John	James	Noah	Elijah	Liam	Oliver	Henry	Asher	Levi
Alaska	Liam, Oliver	Theodore	Noah	Elijah	Henry	William	James, Michael	Ezra	Alexander, Elias, Jack	John
Arizona	Liam, Mateo	Noah	Oliver	Santiago	Sebastian	Elijah	Ezra	Benjamin, Levi	Theodore	James, Julian
Arkansas	Liam	Oliver	Noah	Hudson	William	Elijah	James	Maverick	Asher	Waylon
California	Noah	Liam	Mateo	Sebastian	Santiago	Julian	Oliver	Benjamin, Elijah	Ezekiel	Ezra
Colorado	Liam	Oliver	Noah	Theodore	Henry	Mateo	William	James	Jack	Benjamin
Connecticut	Noah	Liam	Oliver	Lucas	James	Luca	William	Jack	Henry, Theodore	Michael
Delaware	Noah	Liam	Carter	Benjamin, Levi, Theodore	Anthony, Cameron, Elijah, James	Luca, Mateo, Oliver	Thomas	David, John, Nolan	Sebastian	Alexander, William
District of Columbia	Liam	Noah	Leo, Theodore	James	Henry	Oliver	Benjamin	William	Charles, Samuel	Sebastian
Florida	Liam	Noah	Lucas	Elijah	Oliver	Dylan	Mateo	Benjamin, Matthew	Luca	James
Georgia	Liam	Noah	William	James	Elijah	Oliver	John	Henry	Asher	Lucas
Hawaii	Elijah	Liam	Noah	Ezekiel	Lucas	Kai	Ezra	Leo, Luke	Oliver	Luca, Theodore
Idaho	Oliver	Liam	Henry	Theodore	James	William	Hudson	Mateo	Asher, Benjamin, Ezra	Noah
Illinois	Noah	Liam	Oliver	Mateo	Theodore	Henry	Benjamin	Lucas	James	William
Indiana	Liam	Oliver	Noah	Theodore	Elijah	Henry	Hudson	William	Maverick	James
Iowa	Oliver	Henry	Theodore	Liam	Noah	Jack	Hudson	William	James	Owen
Kansas	Liam	Oliver	Noah	Theodore	Henry	James	Elijah	Hudson	William	Owen
Kentucky	Liam	Oliver	Noah	William	Elijah	Waylon	James	Hudson	Levi	Theodore
Louisiana	Liam	Noah	Elijah	James	Oliver	John	Levi, William	Luke	Asher	Hudson
Maine	Oliver	Theodore	Henry	Jack	Owen	Noah	Lincoln	Liam	James	Hudson, Levi, Wyatt
Maryland	Liam	Noah	James, Oliver	Lucas	Dylan	Ethan, Henry	Theodore, William	Benjamin	Mateo	Elijah
Massachusetts	Noah	Liam	Oliver	James	Henry	Theodore	Benjamin	Jack	Lucas	William
Michigan	Noah	Theodore	Oliver	Henry	Liam	Hudson	Elijah	Jack	Benjamin	James
Minnesota	Liam	Henry, Theodore	Oliver	Noah	Owen	James	Levi	William	Jack	Hudson
Mississippi	William	John	James	Noah	Liam	Elijah	Waylon	Mason	Asher	Samuel, Walker
Missouri	Oliver	Henry	Theodore	Noah	Liam	James, William	Hudson	Elijah	Jack	Asher
Montana	Oliver	Theodore	James	Henry	Owen	Noah	Hudson, Jackson	William	Liam	Asher
Nebraska	Oliver	Liam	Henry	Theodore	Noah, William	Leo	Elijah	Jack, Owen	Asher	James
Nevada	Liam	Noah	Mateo	Sebastian	Oliver	Santiago	Elijah, Ezekiel	Ezra, Julian	Elias	Michael
New Hampshire	Oliver	Theodore	Jack	Henry	William	James	Owen	Lucas	Noah	Levi
New Jersey	Liam	Noah	Lucas	Joseph	Michael	James	Jack	Jacob	Luca	Ethan
New Mexico	Liam	Mateo	Noah, Santiago	Ezekiel	Elijah	Ezra	Josiah	Sebastian	Julian	Lucas
New York	Liam	Noah	Lucas	David	Joseph	Oliver	James	Michael	Jack	Jacob
North Carolina	Liam	Noah	William	James	Oliver	Elijah, Henry	Levi	Lucas	Theodore	Jackson
North Dakota	Oliver	Hudson	Henry, Theodore	Asher	James, Noah	Jack	Maverick	Brooks	William	Grayson, Liam, Owen
Ohio	Oliver	Theodore	Liam	Elijah	Noah	Henry	Elijah	Hudson	William	Owen
Oklahoma	Liam	Oliver	Noah	Elijah	James	James	William	Henry	Theodore	Maverick
Oregon	Oliver	Liam	Henry	Theodore	Noah	Mateo	Benjamin	William	Ezra	Hudson
Pennsylvania	Noah	Liam	Oliver	Henry	Benjamin	James	Owen	Theodore	Lucas	Michael
Rhode Island	Noah	Liam	Oliver	Henry	Benjamin	James	Owen	Theodore	Lucas	Michael
South Carolina	Noah	William	Liam	James	John	Elijah	Oliver	Henry	Hudson	Lucas
South Dakota	Oliver	Henry	Hudson	Theodore	Owen	Liam	William	James	Grayson, Leo	Levi
Tennessee	Liam	Oliver	James	William	Elijah	Noah	Henry	John	Waylon	Hudson
Texas	Liam	Noah	Mateo	Santiago	Sebastian	Elijah	Oliver	Ezra	Lucas	Levi
Utah	Liam	Oliver	Henry	William	James	Jack	Hudson	Miles	Noah	Theodore
Vermont	Oliver	Henry	Theodore	Hudson	Levi	Asher	Benjamin, Noah, Owen	Jack	Elijah, Jackson, Liam, Sawyer	James, Maverick, Miles
Virginia	Liam	Noah	James	Oliver	William	Lucas	Henry	Theodore	Benjamin	Elijah
Washington	Oliver	Liam	Noah	Theodore	Henry	Mateo	James	Benjamin	Lucas	Ezra
West Virginia	Oliver	Waylon	Grayson	Maverick	Noah	Hudson	Asher	Elijah, Jackson	Liam	Lincoln
Wisconsin	Theodore	Oliver	Henry, Liam	Noah	William	Levi	Hudson	James	Jack	Owen
Wyoming	Henry, Jack	Carter, Elijah, Liam, Wyatt	Lucas, William	Benjamin, Theodore, Waylon	Levi, Noah, Oliver, Ryker	Bennett, Ryder, Samuel, Stetson	Asher, Easton, Hudson, Lincoln, Luke, Owen	Jackson, James, Mateo, Miles	Ezra, Logan, Maverick, Michael, Rowan, Thomas, Weston	Charles, Daniel, Grayson, Jameson, John, Joseph, Sawyer, Silas

Female names
Region	No. 1	No. 2	No. 3	No. 4	No. 5	No. 6	No. 7	No. 8	No. 9	No. 10
Alabama	Olivia	Charlotte	Amelia	Ava	Elizabeth	Emma	Evelyn	Harper	Nova	Mary
Alaska	Charlotte	Aurora	Amelia, Hazel	Emma	Penelope	Evelyn, Nora	Eleanor	Ava, Harper	Aria, Ella, Ellie, Isabella, Isla, Olivia, Sophia	Avery
Arizona	Olivia	Emma	Mia	Isabella	Sophia	Camila	Amelia	Charlotte	Evelyn	Luna
Arkansas	Olivia	Amelia	Charlotte	Emma	Evelyn	Hazel	Harper	Ava	Sophia	Eleanor, Scarlett
California	Olivia	Mia	Camila	Emma	Isabella	Sophia	Sofia	Luna	Amelia	Gianna
Colorado	Charlotte	Olivia	Sophia	Emma	Amelia, Mia	Evelyn	Isabella	Harper	Ava	Sofia
Connecticut	Olivia	Charlotte	Mia	Emma	Amelia	Ava	Sophia	Isabella	Madison	Sofia
Delaware	Charlotte	Isabella	Emma, Olivia	Ava, Mia	Amelia, Harper	Aurora	Luna	Penelope	Evelyn, Layla	Mila
District of Columbia	Charlotte	Olivia	Naomi	Sophia	Maya	Mia	Zoe	Ava, Elizabeth	Emma	Eleanor, Sofia
Florida	Olivia	Emma	Isabella	Mia	Sophia	Amelia	Charlotte	Luna	Ava	Sofia
Georgia	Olivia	Charlotte	Amelia	Emma	Ava	Sophia	Isabella	Evelyn	Nova	Elizabeth, Harper
Hawaii	Isla	Mia	Olivia	Luna	Ava, Emma	Aria, Kaia	Charlotte	Amelia, Mahina, Maya	Elizabeth, Mila	Sophia
Idaho	Olivia	Charlotte	Evelyn	Amelia	Emma	Harper	Hazel	Sophia	Ava	Willow
Illinois	Olivia	Emma	Mia	Sophia	Charlotte	Amelia	Sofia	Ava	Evelyn	Isabella
Indiana	Charlotte	Amelia	Olivia	Eleanor	Evelyn, Sophia	Emma	Ava	Hazel	Harper	Mia
Iowa	Charlotte	Olivia	Amelia	Harper	Evelyn	Emma	Sophia	Eleanor	Ava	Hazel
Kansas	Amelia	Charlotte	Olivia	Evelyn	Emma	Eleanor	Sophia	Nora	Elizabeth	Ava
Kentucky	Amelia	Charlotte	Emma	Olivia	Evelyn	Harper	Willow	Sophia	Ella	Ava
Louisiana	Amelia	Olivia	Charlotte	Ava	Harper	Emma	Ellie	Ivy	Evelyn	Sophia
Maine	Charlotte	Evelyn	Olivia	Eleanor, Harper	Amelia	Emma, Violet	Hazel	Aurora	Ava, Grace, Isla	Ellie, Ivy, Lucy
Maryland	Olivia	Emma	Charlotte	Sophia	Mia	Amelia	Ava	Isabella	Harper	Zoe
Massachusetts	Charlotte	Olivia	Emma	Sophia	Isabella	Mia	Amelia	Nora	Chloe	Evelyn
Michigan	Charlotte	Amelia	Olivia	Sophia	Emma	Ava	Harper	Evelyn	Eleanor	Nora
Minnesota	Charlotte	Olivia	Evelyn	Emma	Amelia	Eleanor	Nora	Sophia	Hazel	Harper
Mississippi	Ava	Amelia	Olivia	Charlotte	Harper	Elizabeth	Emma, Mary, Nova	Evelyn	Ella	Brooklyn, Emery
Missouri	Charlotte	Olivia	Amelia	Eleanor, Harper	Emma	Evelyn	Sophia	Ava	Hazel	Willow
Montana	Charlotte	Emma	Hazel, Olivia	Amelia, Eleanor, Nora	Evelyn	Harper, Isla	Sophia, Willow	Ava, Paisley	Aurora, Scarlett	Avery, Lainey, Lucy
Nebraska	Charlotte	Olivia	Sophia	Amelia	Evelyn	Mia	Emma	Harper	Eleanor	Lucy, Nora
Nevada	Olivia	Isabella	Mia	Sophia	Charlotte	Camila	Luna	Amelia	Emma	Ava
New Hampshire	Charlotte	Olivia	Evelyn	Amelia	Emma, Nora	Sophia	Harper	Maeve	Isabella, Scarlett	Mia
New Jersey	Olivia	Emma	Mia	Sophia	Isabella	Charlotte	Ava	Amelia	Madison	Leah
New Mexico	Olivia	Amelia	Mia	Isabella	Emma, Sofia	Aria, Luna, Sophia	Camila	Mila	Evelyn	Aurora
New York	Emma	Olivia	Sophia	Mia	Amelia	Isabella	Charlotte	Ava	Leah	Luna
North Carolina	Olivia	Amelia	Charlotte	Emma	Sophia	Ava	Mia	Evelyn, Harper	Isabella	Eleanor
North Dakota	Evelyn	Charlotte	Amelia, Harper	Olivia	Nora	Hazel, Ivy	Willow	Elizabeth, Lainey, Violet	Eleanor, Ella	Isla
Ohio	Charlotte	Amelia	Olivia	Sophia	Evelyn	Emma	Ava	Harper	Eleanor	Nora
Oklahoma	Olivia	Amelia	Emma	Sophia	Charlotte, Harper	Evelyn	Hazel	Mia	Ellie	Ava
Oregon	Olivia	Amelia	Evelyn	Charlotte	Emma	Sophia	Isabella	Mia	Hazel	Luna
Pennsylvania	Charlotte	Olivia	Emma	Sophia	Amelia	Ava	Isabella	Evelyn, Harper	Mia	Nora
Rhode Island	Charlotte	Sophia	Olivia	Amelia	Emma	Nora	Luna	Isabella	Mia	Aurora, Isla
South Carolina	Olivia	Charlotte	Amelia	Emma	Ava	Elizabeth	Sophia	Harper	Nova	Evelyn
South Dakota	Ava	Charlotte	Nora	Amelia	Evelyn	Olivia	Lainey	Emma, Harper	Mia, Paisley	Ellie, Willow
Tennessee	Charlotte	Olivia	Amelia	Emma	Ava	Evelyn	Harper	Isabella	Eleanor	Sophia
Texas	Emma	Olivia	Camila	Mia	Isabella	Sophia	Sofia	Amelia	Charlotte	Ava
Utah	Charlotte	Olivia	Emma	Evelyn	Lucy	Hazel	Amelia	Lily	Mia	Ellie, Sophie
Vermont	Amelia, Eleanor	Charlotte	Evelyn	Sophia	Emma	Hazel	Elizabeth, Lily	Ella, Iris, Isabella, Isla, Lucy, Violet	Maeve, Mia, Nora	Harper, Ivy, Paisley, Zoey
Virginia	Charlotte	Olivia	Emma	Sophia	Amelia	Ava	Evelyn	Isabella	Mia	Elizabeth
Washington	Olivia	Amelia	Emma	Sophia	Evelyn	Charlotte	Mia	Isabella	Harper	Eleanor
West Virginia	Amelia	Charlotte	Harper	Olivia	Willow	Paisley	Ellie, Lainey	Sophia	Oaklynn	Ivy
Wisconsin	Charlotte	Olivia	Evelyn	Amelia	Emma	Nora	Eleanor	Harper	Ava	Sophia
Wyoming	Evelyn	Amelia	Olivia	Harper	Charlotte	Hazel	Aurora, Scarlett	Paisley, Sophia	Eleanor, Emma, Lainey	Ava, Isabella, Juniper, Nora

== 2024 ==
Male names
Region	No. 1	No. 2	No. 3	No. 4	No. 5	No. 6	No. 7	No. 8	No. 9	No. 10
Alabama	William	John	James	Liam	Noah	Elijah	Henry	Oliver	Samuel	Asher
Alaska	Oliver	Theodore	Liam, Noah	Henry	Elias	James	Elijah	Luke	Gabriel	John, Maverick
Arizona	Liam	Noah	Mateo	Oliver	Santiago	Sebastian	Elijah	Julian	Elias, Ezra, Theodore	Benjamin
Arkansas	Liam	Oliver	Noah	Elijah	Asher	Hudson	James	Henry	William	Samuel
California	Liam	Noah	Mateo	Santiago	Sebastian	Julian	Oliver	Ezra	Lucas	Ethan
Colorado	Liam	Oliver	Noah	Henry	Theodore	Mateo	James	Owen	William	Jack
Connecticut	Liam	Noah	Oliver	James	Theodore	Henry	Luca, Lucas	Cameron	Joseph	Jack
Delaware	Liam	Noah	Oliver	James	Elijah	Owen	Dylan	Theodore	Lucas	Leo
District of Columbia	James	Liam	Henry	Noah, Theodore	Benjamin, William	Julian	Oliver	Ethan	Luca	Michael
Florida	Liam	Noah	Lucas	Elijah	Oliver	Mateo	Dylan	Thiago	Luca	Ethan
Georgia	Liam	Noah	James	William	Oliver	Elijah	John	Henry	Asher	Lucas
Hawaii	Noah	Elijah, Ezra, Liam	Theodore	Luca	Kai	Levi	Luke, Oliver	Ezekiel	James, Leo, Mateo, Maverick, Roman	Asher, Isaiah, Luka, Micah
Idaho	Oliver	Henry	Liam	Theodore	James	Noah	Hudson, Jack, William	Elijah	Luke	Weston
Illinois	Oliver	Liam	Theodore	Noah	Henry	Elijah	Hudson	James	Asher	Benjamin
Indiana	Liam	Oliver	Noah	Theodore	Elijah	Henry	Hudson	William	Maverick	James
Iowa	Oliver	Henry	Liam	Theodore	Noah	Elijah	Jack	Cooper	Hudson, Owen	Asher
Kansas	Oliver	Theodore	Liam	Noah	Henry	James	Hudson	William	Bennett	Cooper
Kentucky	Liam	Oliver	Waylon	Noah	Hudson	Elijah	James	William	Levi	Asher
Louisiana	Liam	Noah	Elijah	John	William	James	Oliver	Henry	Levi	Hudson
Maine	Oliver	Theodore	Henry	Jack	Owen	Noah	Lincoln	Liam	James	Hudson, Levi, Wyatt
Maryland	Liam	Noah	James, Oliver	Lucas	Dylan	Ethan, Henry	Theodore, William	Benjamin	Mateo	Elijah
Massachusetts	Noah	Liam	Oliver	James	Henry	Theodore	Benjamin	Jack	Lucas	William
Michigan	Noah	Theodore	Oliver	Henry	Liam	Hudson	Elijah	Jack	Benjamin	James
Minnesota	Liam	Henry, Theodore	Oliver	Noah	Owen	James	Levi	William	Jack	Hudson
Mississippi	William	John	James	Noah	Liam	Elijah	Waylon	Mason	Asher	Samuel, Walker
Missouri	Oliver	Henry	Theodore	Noah	Liam	James, William	Hudson	Elijah	Jack	Asher
Montana	Oliver	James	Theodore	Hudson	William	Liam	Noah	Beau	Asher, Maverick	Henry
Nebraska	Oliver	Theodore	Henry	Liam	Noah	Mateo	William	Cooper, Maverick	Elijah	Hudson
Nevada	Liam	Mateo	Noah	Sebastian	Santiago	Elijah, Oliver	Ezra	Benjamin	Julian	Elias
New Hampshire	Theodore	Oliver	Henry	Noah	James	Jack	Liam	Benjamin, Jackson, Owen	William	Wyatt
New Jersey	Liam	Noah	Lucas	Joseph	Michael	Ethan	Luca	Anthony	James	Oliver
New Mexico	Noah	Mateo	Ezekiel, Liam	Santiago	Elijah	Levi	Ezra	Elias	Sebastian	Daniel
New York	Liam	Noah	Lucas	Ethan	Joseph	Theodore	Oliver	David	Jacob	James
North Carolina	Liam	Noah	Oliver	William	James	Henry	Elijah	Lucas	Theodore	Levi
North Dakota	Oliver	Henry	Theodore	Brooks	Liam, Maverick	Owen	Hudson	Asher, Noah	Elijah	Beau
Ohio	Oliver	Noah	Theodore	Liam	Henry	James	Hudson	Elijah, Lucas	Grayson	William
Oklahoma	Liam	Oliver	Noah	Elijah	Theodore	William	Asher	Ezra	Hudson	James
Oregon	Oliver	Liam	Theodore	Noah	Henry	Elijah	Mateo	William	Benjamin	James
Pennsylvania	Noah	Liam	Oliver	Theodore	Henry	James	Lucas	Benjamin	Levi	Jack, Michael
Rhode Island	Liam	Noah	Lucas	Henry	Oliver, Theodore	Luca	Michael	James	Alexander	Gabriel, Owen
South Carolina	Noah	Liam	William	James	Oliver	John	Henry	Elijah	Theodore	Thomas
South Dakota	Liam, Oliver	Henry	Theodore	Asher	Brooks	Jack, Noah, William	Hudson	Elijah	Beau, Cooper	Bennett
Tennessee	Liam	Oliver	William	Noah	James	Henry	Elijah	John	Hudson	Waylon
Texas	Liam	Noah	Mateo	Santiago	Sebastian	Elijah	Oliver	Elias	Ezra	Daniel
Utah	Oliver	Liam	Henry	William	Jack	Noah	James	Theodore	Hudson	Miles
Vermont	Oliver	Henry	Theodore	Noah	Owen	Ezra, Jack, Levi	James, Liam, Samuel, Wesley	Benjamin, Carter, Miles, Wyatt	Charles, Leo, Mason	Arlo, Bentley
Virginia	Liam	Noah	James	William	Oliver	Henry	Theodore	Lucas	Elijah	John
Washington	Oliver	Liam	Noah	Theodore	Henry	Benjamin	Mateo	William	Daniel	James
West Virginia	Oliver	Waylon	Maverick	Hudson, Liam	Elijah	Noah	Asher	Wyatt	Grayson	Weston
Wisconsin	Oliver	Henry	Liam	Theodore	Noah	James	Owen	Levi	William	Hudson
Wyoming	Oliver	Hudson, James	Theodore	William	Henry, Liam, Noah	Grayson, Waylon	Beau, Ezra, Mason, Stetson	Asher, John	Benjamin, Elijah, Luke, Maverick	Alexander, Logan, Michael, Wesley

Female names
Region	No. 1	No. 2	No. 3	No. 4	No. 5	No. 6	No. 7	No. 8	No. 9	No. 10
Alabama	Charlotte	Olivia	Amelia	Elizabeth	Emma	Mary	Harper	Ava	Evelyn	Sophia
Alaska	Amelia	Olivia	Aurora	Violet	Emma	Sophia	Harper	Eleanor	Evelyn	Elizabeth, Isabella
Arizona	Olivia	Emma	Isabella	Sophia	Amelia	Mia	Camila	Charlotte	Sofia	Luna
Arkansas	Olivia	Amelia	Emma	Charlotte	Harper	Ava	Evelyn	Willow	Sophia	Ivy
California	Mia	Olivia	Camila	Emma	Sophia	Isabella	Amelia	Sofia	Luna	Gianna
Colorado	Olivia	Charlotte	Emma	Amelia	Mia	Sophia	Isabella	Evelyn	Harper	Hazel
Connecticut	Mia	Olivia	Charlotte	Emma	Amelia	Isabella	Sophia	Ava	Chloe	Ella
Delaware	Charlotte	Sophia	Emma	Isabella	Mia	Olivia	Amelia, Luna	Harper	Ava	Elizabeth, Evelyn
District of Columbia	Charlotte	Olivia	Zoe	Emma	Sophia	Ava	Maya	Elizabeth, Mia, Naomi	Sofia, Sophie	Eleanor, Grace, Nora
Florida	Olivia	Emma	Mia	Isabella	Sophia	Amelia	Charlotte	Sofia	Valentina	Luna
Georgia	Charlotte	Olivia	Amelia	Emma	Ava	Isabella	Mia	Sophia	Elizabeth, Evelyn	Nova
Hawaii	Olivia	Emma, Kaia	Amelia	Lily, Mia, Sophia	Ava	Isla	Aurora	Chloe	Charlotte	Isabella
Idaho	Charlotte	Hazel	Olivia	Evelyn	Amelia	Lainey	Sophia	Eleanor	Emma, Lucy	Mia
Illinois	Olivia	Mia	Charlotte	Sophia	Emma	Amelia	Sofia	Isabella	Evelyn	Ava
Indiana	Charlotte	Amelia	Sophia	Olivia	Emma	Evelyn	Eleanor	Harper	Mia	Ava
Iowa	Charlotte	Amelia	Evelyn, Harper	Olivia	Eleanor	Emma	Nora	Hazel	Ellie	Ava
Kansas	Charlotte	Olivia	Emma	Amelia	Sophia	Evelyn	Eleanor	Harper	Aurora, Elizabeth, Mia	Lainey, Violet
Kentucky	Charlotte	Amelia	Lainey, Willow	Olivia	Emma	Harper	Ellie, Ivy	Eleanor	Evelyn	Sophia
Louisiana	Olivia	Amelia	Charlotte	Ava	Evelyn	Emma	Mia	Ellie, Harper	Eleanor	Chloe
Maine	Charlotte	Olivia	Evelyn	Eleanor	Sophia	Amelia, Emma, Hazel, Nora	Addison	Grace, Harper	Ella, Penelope	Aurora, Avery, Chloe, Willow
Maryland	Olivia	Charlotte	Emma	Sophia	Mia	Zoe	Ava	Amelia	Isabella	Chloe
Massachusetts	Olivia	Charlotte	Emma	Sophia	Amelia	Mia	Isabella	Nora	Sofia	Zoe
Michigan	Charlotte	Amelia	Olivia	Emma	Evelyn	Sophia	Ava	Harper	Violet	Nora
Minnesota	Charlotte	Evelyn	Olivia	Emma	Amelia	Nora	Eleanor	Sophia	Hazel, Violet	Lainey
Mississippi	Ava	Olivia	Amelia	Harper	Mary	Charlotte, Elizabeth	Ivy	Emma, Nova	Paisley	Hazel
Missouri	Amelia	Charlotte	Olivia	Eleanor	Evelyn	Sophia	Emma	Harper	Hazel, Violet	Lainey
Montana	Lainey	Charlotte	Olivia	Eleanor	Evelyn	Amelia	Emma	Hazel, Isla, Nora	Ember	Harper
Nebraska	Charlotte	Evelyn	Amelia, Harper, Olivia	Lainey	Sophia	Emma	Hazel	Eleanor, Nora	Mia	Violet
Nevada	Olivia	Isabella	Sophia	Mia	Camila	Amelia	Emma	Luna	Sofia	Eliana
New Hampshire	Charlotte	Olivia	Amelia	Evelyn, Sophia	Emma, Harper	Maeve	Isabella	Nora	Isla	Eleanor
New Jersey	Mia	Sophia	Emma	Olivia	Charlotte	Amelia	Isabella	Sofia	Leah	Ava
New Mexico	Mia	Camila	Emma	Sophia	Olivia	Isabella	Amelia	Aurora	Sofia	Eliana
New York	Mia	Emma	Sophia	Olivia	Isabella	Charlotte	Amelia	Sofia	Leah	Ava
North Carolina	Olivia	Amelia	Emma	Charlotte	Sophia	Ava	Isabella	Mia	Evelyn	Elizabeth
North Dakota	Evelyn	Amelia, Lainey	Aurora, Ivy, Nora	Ellie	Olivia	Charlotte	Emma, Harper, Hazel, Sophia	Ella, Violet	Isla, Lucy	Ava
Ohio	Charlotte	Amelia	Olivia	Evelyn	Sophia	Emma	Eleanor	Harper	Nora	Lainey
Oklahoma	Olivia	Amelia	Charlotte	Evelyn	Emma	Eleanor	Mia	Ivy	Sophia	Ellie
Oregon	Olivia	Amelia	Charlotte	Emma, Sophia	Eleanor	Evelyn	Aurora, Hazel	Violet	Mia	Luna
Pennsylvania	Olivia	Charlotte	Emma	Sophia	Amelia	Mia	Isabella	Harper	Evelyn	Ava
Rhode Island	Charlotte	Mia	Emma	Amelia	Olivia	Sophia	Violet	Maeve	Ava	Isabella
South Carolina	Charlotte	Amelia	Olivia	Emma	Ava	Sophia	Evelyn	Elizabeth	Mia	Eleanor
South Dakota	Amelia	Charlotte, Lainey	Harper	Olivia	Emma	Nora	Eleanor	Ellie, Violet, Willow	Evelyn	Aurora
Tennessee	Amelia	Charlotte	Olivia	Evelyn	Emma	Harper	Ava	Eleanor	Elizabeth	Sophia
Texas	Olivia	Emma	Mia	Camila	Isabella	Sophia	Amelia	Sofia	Charlotte	Eliana
Utah	Olivia	Charlotte	Emma	Amelia	Evelyn	Lucy	Hazel, Mia	Harper	Ruby	Ivy
Vermont	Amelia	Charlotte	Harper	Lucy, Violet	Eleanor, Maeve, Olivia	Emma, Nora	Ella, Hazel, Josephine	Juniper	Lainey, Lily, Willow	Addison, Adeline, Avery, Evelyn, Lillian, Madeline
Virginia	Charlotte	Olivia	Sophia	Emma	Amelia	Isabella	Mia	Ava, Evelyn	Eleanor	Elizabeth
Washington	Olivia	Charlotte	Amelia	Emma	Evelyn	Mia	Sophia	Eleanor	Sofia	Hazel
West Virginia	Amelia	Lainey, Olivia	Willow	Charlotte	Emma, Scarlett	Sophia	Aurora, Evelyn	Harper	Paisley	Ava
Wisconsin	Charlotte	Olivia	Evelyn	Amelia	Emma	Eleanor	Violet	Nora	Sophia	Lainey
Wyoming	Emma	Harper, Hazel	Charlotte, Eleanor, Evelyn, Sophia	Ember	Amelia, Ava, Ivy	Aurora, Ellie, Isabella	Elizabeth, Isla, Willow	Lainey, Nova, Paisley	Iris, Lucy, Nora, Olivia	Avery, Luna, Oaklynn

== 2025 ==
Male names
Region	No. 1	No. 2	No. 3	No. 4	No. 5	No. 6	No. 7	No. 8	No. 9	No. 10
Alabama	John	William	James	Liam	Noah	Oliver	Hudson, Samuel	Henry	Elijah	Waylon
Alaska	Noah	Theodore	Henry	Oliver	James	William	Elias	Liam	Elijah	Benjamin, Charles
Arizona	Liam	Noah	Mateo	Santiago	Oliver	Elias	Sebastian	Theodore	Elijah	Ezra
Arkansas	Liam	Hudson	Oliver	Elijah	Noah	James	Henry	William	Waylon	Theodore
California	Liam	Noah	Mateo	Santiago	Sebastian	Julian	Oliver	Elias	Benjamin	Elijah, Luca
Colorado	Liam	Theodore	Noah	Oliver	James	Henry	Mateo	William	Cooper	Elias
Connecticut	Noah	Liam	Theodore	James	Luca	Oliver	Henry	Jack	Lucas	Joseph
Delaware	Noah	Liam	Oliver	James	Lucas	Theodore	Benjamin, Elijah	John, Cooper, Levi, Logan, Mason	Brooks	Anthony
District of Columbia	Noah	Theodore	Henry, Liam	William	James	Charles, John, Mateo	George, Oliver, Samuel	Julian	Leo, Lucas	Daniel, Thomas
Florida	Liam	Noah	Lucas	Elijah	Oliver	Mateo	Luca	James	Benjamin	Matthew
Georgia	Liam	Noah	William	Elijah	James	Oliver	Henry	John	Theodore	Asher
Hawaii	Elijah	Noah	Liam, Luca	Luke	Ezekiel, Levi	Theodore	Henry	John	Atlas, Lucas	Kai
Idaho	Oliver	Theodore	Henry	Liam	Hudson	Cooper, William	Noah	Asher, James	Benjamin, Jack	Elijah
Illinois	Liam	Noah	Oliver	Theodore	Henry	Mateo	James	Leo	Benjamin	Sebastian
Indiana	Oliver	Liam	Theodore	Henry	Noah	James	Hudson	Elijah	Benjamin	Cooper
Iowa	Oliver	Liam	Henry, Theodore	Cooper	Hudson	James, Noah	Bennett	Owen	Elijah	Jack
Kansas	Theodore	Oliver	Noah	Liam	Henry	James	Hudson	William	Elijah	Bennett
Kentucky	Oliver	Liam	Hudson	Waylon	Noah	Henry, Theodore	Elijah	James	William	Asher
Louisiana	Noah	Liam	James	Elijah	John	Oliver	William	Hudson	Joseph	Henry, Levi
Maine	Theodore	Oliver	Henry	Noah	Levi	Wesley	Jack	James, William	Bennett, Hudson, Liam	Benjamin, Lucas, Mason, Owen
Maryland	Liam	Noah	Lucas	Theodore	Oliver	William	Ethan, Henry	James	Thiago	Elijah
Massachusetts	Noah	Liam	Henry	Theodore	James	Jack	Benjamin	Oliver	William	Lucas
Michigan	Theodore	Noah	Oliver	Henry	James	Jack	Hudson	Liam	Levi	Elijah
Minnesota	Theodore	Henry	Oliver	Liam	Noah	James	William	Jack	Leo	Bennett
Mississippi	James	William	John	Noah	Elijah	Waylon	Liam	Henry	Hudson	Thomas
Missouri	Oliver	Theodore	Henry	Noah	Hudson, Liam	William	James	Cooper	Bennett	Elijah
Montana	Oliver	Henry	William	Hudson, Theodore	James	Waylon, Weston	Cooper	Colter, Liam	Miles Owen	Maverick
Nebraska	Liam	Theodore	Henry	Noah	Oliver	Cooper	James	William	Benjamin	Hudson
Nevada	Liam	Mateo	Noah	Santiago	Oliver	Sebastian	Elijah	Elias	James	Julian
New Hampshire	Theodore	Henry	Oliver	Jack, James	Liam	Lucas	Noah	Wesley	Owen, William	Benjamin
New Jersey	Liam	Noah	Lucas	Luca	Joseph	James	Michael	Theodore	Oliver	Jack
New Mexico	Noah	Liam	Mateo	Elijah	Santiago	Sebastian	Ezra	Elias, Ezekiel	Levi	Lucas
New York	Noah	Liam	Theodore	Lucas	Oliver	Luca	Joseph	James	Jacob	Ethan
North Carolina	Noah	Liam	Oliver	William	James	Henry	Elijah	Theodore	Levi	John
North Dakota	Liam	Henry, Theodore	Noah	Oliver	Cooper	Hudson	Bennett	James	Colter	Asher, Jack, Leo
Ohio	Oliver	Theodore	Noah	Henry	Liam	Hudson	William	James	Elijah	Jack
Oklahoma	Liam	Noah	Oliver	Theodore	Elijah	Hudson	Henry	Waylon	Mateo	James
Oregon	Oliver	Theodore	Liam	Henry	Noah	Mateo	Benjamin	Hudson	William	Jack
Pennsylvania	Noah	Liam	Theodore	Oliver	Henry	James	Benjamin	Cooper	Lucas	Michael
Rhode Island	Noah	Liam	Oliver	Theodore	Luca	Benjamin, Lucas	Henry	John	Owen	James
South Carolina	Noah	Liam	William	James	Elijah	John	Oliver	Henry	Theodore	Lucas
South Dakota	Oliver	Liam	Henry, Hudson, Noah	Theodore	Beau	William	Leo	Maverick	Elijah	Brooks
Tennessee	Noah	Liam	Oliver	James	Henry	William	Hudson, Theodore	Waylon	John	Elijah
Texas	Liam	Noah	Mateo	Santiago	Sebastian	Elijah	Oliver	Elias	Levi	Julian
Utah	Oliver	Liam	Theodore	Jack	Noah	Henry	Hudson	William	James	Brooks
Vermont	Oliver	Theodore	Henry	Cooper	Hudson, Jack	James, Weston	Bennett, Liam, Noah, Owen	Grayson, Leo	William	Charles, Everett, Thomas
Virginia	Liam	Noah	Theodore	Oliver	Henry	James	William	Elijah	Lucas	John
Washington	Noah	Liam	Oliver	Theodore	Henry	Benjamin	Mateo	James	Samuel	Elijah
West Virginia	Waylon	Hudson	Oliver	Noah	Wyatt	Cooper	Asher	Weston	Liam, Theodore	James
Wisconsin	Oliver	Theodore	Henry	Liam	Noah	Hudson	Jack	James	Cooper	Levi
Wyoming	Theodore	James	William	Oliver	Rowan	Ezra	Carter, Cooper, Hudson, Levi, Liam, Wesley	John, Noah, Stetson	Beau, Jacob, Lincoln, Michael	Asher, Elias, Elijah, Henry, Jackson, Luke, Waylon

Female names
Region	No. 1	No. 2	No. 3	No. 4	No. 5	No. 6	No. 7	No. 8	No. 9	No. 10
Alabama	Charlotte	Amelia	Olivia	Elizabeth	Emma	Mary	Harper	Ava, Eleanor	Ellie	Evelyn
Alaska	Charlotte	Amelia	Emma	Evelyn	Aurora, Olivia, Penelope, Violet	Eleanor	Ellie, Lucy	Abigail, Juniper, Sophia	Iris, Josephine, Lily	Athena, Eloise, Grace, Harper, Hazel, Isla, Ivy, Nora, Willow
Arizona	Olivia	Sophia	Mia	Amelia	Isabella	Emma	Charlotte	Eliana	Camila	Sofia
Arkansas	Charlotte	Amelia	Olivia	Isabella	Eleanor	Evelyn	Emma, Harper	Willow	Sophia	Hazel
California	Olivia	Mia	Sophia	Camila	Emma	Isabella	Amelia	Sofia	Eliana	Valentina
Colorado	Charlotte	Olivia	Sophia	Emma	Mia	Evelyn	Amelia	Sofia	Isabella	Eleanor
Connecticut	Charlotte	Sophia	Olivia	Amelia	Mia	Emma	Isabella	Nora, Sofia	Madison	Lily
Delaware	Mia	Sophia	Isabella	Charlotte	Emma, Olivia	Amelia	Ailany	Ava	Layla	Isla
District of Columbia	Emma	Sophia	Charlotte	Lucy, Zoe	Eleanor	Ava, Sofia	Amelia, Olivia	Chloe, Josephine	Lily	Mia
Florida	Olivia	Mia	Isabella	Emma	Sophia	Amelia	Charlotte	Sofia	Valentina	Eliana
Georgia	Amelia	Charlotte	Olivia	Emma	Isabella	Sophia	Ava	Evelyn, Mia	Elizabeth	Eliana
Hawaii	Isla	Emma	Luna, Sophia	Olivia	Amelia	Ava, Chloe	Kaia	Aria	Eliana, Lily	Charlotte, Isabella
Idaho	Charlotte	Amelia	Evelyn	Emma, Olivia	Hazel	Lainey	Sophia	Violet	Lucy	Harper
Illinois	Olivia	Charlotte	Sophia	Emma	Mia	Amelia	Sofia	Isabella	Camila	Evelyn
Indiana	Charlotte	Amelia	Eleanor	Evelyn	Sophia	Emma, Olivia	Harper	Lainey	Violet	Hazel
Iowa	Charlotte	Evelyn	Emma	Amelia	Eleanor	Olivia	Sophia	Lainey	Harper	Violet
Kansas	Charlotte	Olivia	Evelyn	Amelia	Eleanor	Sophia	Emma	Harper	Lainey	Mia
Kentucky	Amelia	Charlotte	Sophia	Evelyn	Lainey	Emma	Willow	Ellie	Eleanor	Harper
Louisiana	Amelia	Olivia	Charlotte	Emma	Sophia	Harper	Ellie	Eleanor	Evelyn	Lucy
Maine	Charlotte	Amelia, Eleanor	Violet	Harper	Evelyn	Lucy, Olivia	Grace	Ivy	Hazel, Sophia, Willow	Nora
Maryland	Ailany	Charlotte	Olivia	Mia	Sophia	Eliana	Emma	Isabella	Amelia	Zoe
Massachusetts	Charlotte	Amelia	Sophia	Eleanor	Evelyn	Olivia	Violet	Emma	Lainey	Harper
Michigan	Charlotte	Amelia	Sophia	Eleanor	Evelyn	Olivia	Violet	Emma	Lainey	Harper
Minnesota	Charlotte	Evelyn	Violet	Eleanor, Nora, Olivia, Sophia	Emma	Lucy	Hazel	Amelia	Lainey	Harper
Mississippi	Amelia	Ava	Charlotte	Olivia	Elizabeth	Mary	Emma	Ivy	Nova	Lainey
Missouri	Charlotte	Amelia	Olivia	Eleanor	Evelyn	Sophia	Emma	Violet, Willow	Harper	Aurora
Montana	Charlotte	Lucy	Amelia	Lainey	Nora	Harper, Violet	Sophia	Evelyn, Isla	Hazel	Ava, Emma, Olivia
Nebraska	Charlotte	Evelyn	Harper	Amelia	Olivia	Eleanor	Ailany, Ivy, Mia, Violet	Emma	Hazel	Clara, Sophia
Nevada	Olivia	Mia	Emma	Isabella	Sophia	Amelia	Charlotte, Sofia	Luna	Camila	Aurora
New Hampshire	Charlotte	Olivia	Sophia	Maeve	Violet	Amelia, Lucy, Nora	Isla	Eleanor, Harper	Emma, Evelyn	Grace
New Jersey	Emma	Mia	Olivia, Sophia	Isabella	Charlotte	Amelia	Ailany	Sofia	Ava	Esther
New Mexico	Mia	Olivia, Sophia	Sofia	Camila	Eliana	Isabella	Amelia	Aria, Aurora, Emma	Evelyn	Charlotte, Elena
New York	Emma	Olivia	Mia	Sophia	Charlotte	Isabella	Amelia	Leah	Sofia	Zoe
North Carolina	Amelia	Charlotte	Olivia	Sophia	Emma	Isabella	Mia	Eliana	Evelyn	Eleanor
North Dakota	Charlotte	Lainey	Olivia	Ellie	Evelyn	Amelia	Ella, Hazel, Ivy	Emma	Aurora, Harper, Isla, Lucy, Nora, Violet	Elizabeth
Ohio	Charlotte	Amelia	Sophia	Evelyn	Olivia	Eleanor	Emma	Lainey	Violet	Nora
Oklahoma	Olivia	Charlotte	Amelia	Sophia	Emma	Evelyn	Isabella	Harper	Violet	Eleanor, Mia
Oregon	Charlotte	Amelia	Olivia	Emma	Sophia	Evelyn	Violet	Hazel	Penelope	Aurora
Pennsylvania	Charlotte	Sophia	Olivia	Amelia	Emma	Isabella	Mia	Evelyn	Ava	Nora
Rhode Island	Charlotte	Olivia	Amelia	Sophia	Ava	Isabella, Isla	Aurora, Mia	Aria, Emma, Maeve, Nora	Luna	Ailany, Mila Zoe
South Carolina	Charlotte	Amelia	Olivia	Emma	Sophia	Evelyn	Ava	Eleanor	Isabella	Mia
South Dakota	Lainey	Charlotte	Evelyn	Emma, Olivia	Eleanor	Ellie, Harper, Nora	Amelia, Lucy	Ella, Ivy	Hazel, Lily, Sophie, Willow	Aurora, Emery, Isla, Sophia
Tennessee	Charlotte	Amelia	Olivia	Emma	Sophia	Eleanor, Evelyn	Harper	Elizabeth	Willow	Ailany
Texas	Emma	Olivia	Isabella	Mia	Sophia	Camila	Amelia	Sofia	Eliana	Ailany
Utah	Emma	Charlotte	Lucy	Olivia	Evelyn	Amelia	Hazel	Eleanor	Lainey	Lily
Vermont	Charlotte	Evelyn	Eleanor	Nora, Sophia	Violet	Ava	Amelia, Aurora, Harper	Ella, Ellie, Emma, Isla, Josephine, Maeve	Willow	Eloise, Penelope, Ruby
Virginia	Charlotte	Emma	Sophia	Olivia	Amelia	Isabella	Evelyn	Eleanor, Mia	Ava, Elizabeth	Eliana
Washington	Olivia	Charlotte	Amelia	Sophia	Evelyn	Mia	Emma	Eleanor	Sofia	Isabella
West Virginia	Charlotte	Amelia	Lainey	Harper	Willow	Sophia, Violet	Oaklynn, Paisley	Ava	Eleanor	Olivia
Wisconsin	Charlotte	Eleanor, Sophia	Evelyn	Emma	Amelia	Nora	Olivia	Violet	Lainey	Harper
Wyoming	Aurora	Evelyn	Amelia	Charlotte, Elizabeth, Hazel	Eleanor, Emma, Harper	Lainey, Olivia, Scarlett, Sophia	Violet	Millie	Chloe, Eden, Ember, Iris, Lucy, Sadie, Sophie, Willow	Eliana, Emery, Hannah, Layla, Lily, Quinn, Ruby

== See also ==
- Popularity of birth names for females (United States)
- Popularity of birth names for males (United States)
